= List of political parties in San Marino =

San Marino has a multi-party system, with numerous parties in which no one party often has a chance of gaining power alone, and parties must work with each other to form coalition governments.

== Existing parties ==
=== Parties with official representation ===
Parties with representation in the Grand and General Council:

Name	Abbr.	Leader	Ideology	Grand Councilors	Political position	Alliance	European affiliation
Sammarinese Christian Democratic Party; Partito Democratico Cristiano Sammarinese	PDCS	Gian Carlo Venturini	Christian democracy	22 / 60	Centre-right	DeL	EPP
Free San Marino; Libera San Marino	Libera	Giuseppe Maria Morganti	Social democracy; Pro-Europeanism	7 / 60	Centre-left	Libera/PS–PSD	SOC
Socialist Party; Partito Socialista	PS	Alessandro Mancini	Social democracy; Pro-Europeanism	3 / 60	Centre-left	Libera/PS–PSD	—N/a
Party of Socialists and Democrats; Partito dei Socialisti e dei Democratici	PSD	Silvia Cecchetti	Social democracy; Pro-Europeanism	8 / 60	Centre-left	Libera/PS–PSD	PES
Future Republic; Repubblica Futura	RF	Mario Venturini	Liberalism; Centrism; Pro-Europeanism	7 / 60	Centre	RF-AreaDem	EDP
Tomorrow — Free Movement; Domani — Motus Liberi	DML	Lorenzo Forcellini Reffi	Liberalism; Conservatism; Soft Euroscepticism	5 / 60	Centre-right	—N/a	ECR
Reformist Alliance; Alleanza Riformista	AR	Gessica Comanducci	Liberalism; Christian democracy	3 / 60	Centre-right	DeL	—N/a
Renewal – Equity – Transparency – Eco-sustainability Civic Movement; Movimento Civico Rinnovamento – Equità – Trasparenza – Ecosostenibilità	RETE	Andrea Giani	Environmentalism; Progressivism; Euroscepticism	3 / 60	Left-wing	—N/a	UEL
Democratic Area; Area Democratica	AreaDem	Augusto Michelotti	Progressivism Reformism	1 / 60	Centre-left	RF-AreaDem	—N/a
Sammarinese Reformist Socialist Party*; Partito Socialista Riformista Sammarinese	PSRS	Paride Andreoli	Social democracy; Reformism; Pro-Europeanism	1 / 60	Centre-left	Formerly part of Reformist Alliance and DeL	—N/a
*Formerly known as Elego for a New Republic (Ēlego per una Nuova Repubblica, Elego)

=== Other parties ===
- National Future with Roberto Vannacci San Marino Constituent Committee (Futuro Nazionale con Roberto Vannacci Comitato Costituente San Marino, FNVCCSM)
- San Marino Community and Territory (Comunità e Territorio San Marino, CTSM)
- Solidary Democracy (Democrazia Solidale, DEMOS)

== Coalitions and electoral lists ==
- Libera/PS – PSD
- Libera/PS: Electoral list, part of Libera/PS – PSD
- Democracy and Freedom (Democrazia e Libertà, DeL): Alliance between PDCS and AR
- RF-AreaDem: Electoral list

== Local electoral lists ==
Acquaviva:

- Together for Acquaviva (Insieme per Acquaviva)
- We for Acquaviva (Noi per Acquaviva)

Borgo Maggiore:

- Borgo to the Center (Borgo al Centro)
- All Together One Big Family (Tutti Insieme una Grande Famiglia)
- Together for the Castle of Borgo Maggiore (Insieme per il Castello di Borgo Maggiore)

Chiesanuova:

- Chiesanuova Together – Citizens to the Centre (Chiesanuova Insieme – Cittadini al Centro)
- Chiesanuova... Our Town (Chiesanuova... Il Nostro Paese)
- We Live in Chiesanuova (viviAMO Chiesanuova)
- Chiesanuova Forward (Chiesanuova Avanti)

City of San Marino:

- Continuity and Innovation (Continuità e Innovazione)
- Let's Live in the City (Viviamocittà)
- Let's Unite San Marino (UniAMO San Marino)
- City that Starts Again (Città che riparte)
- Let's Unite the City (uniAMOcittà)
- We Love the City (Amiamo Città)
- The City Beyond the Walls (Città Oltre Le Mura)

Domagnano:

- Domagnano Alive Town (Domagnano paese ViVo)
- Domagnano in the Center (Domagnano al Centro)
- Domagnano Today and Tomorrow (Domagnano Oggi e Domani)
- Domagnano Together (Domagnano Insieme)

Faetano:

- Together for Faetano (Insieme per Faetano)
- Long Live Faetano (Faetano Viva)

Fiorentino:

- Fiorentino Civic List (Lista Civica Fiorentino)
- Fiorentino for Fiorentino (Fiorentino per Fiorentino)
- Long Live Fiorentino (Fiorentino Viva)
- Fiorentino to Live (Fiorentino da Vivere)
- United for Fiorentino (Uniti per Fiorentino)

Montegiardino:

- For Montegiardino (Per Montegiardino)
- Together for Montegiardino (Insieme per Montegiardino)
- United for Montegiardino (Uniti per Montegiardino)

Serravalle:

- The Municipality I Would Like (Il Castello che vorrei)
- Free Voice (Voce Libera)
- A Castle for Everyone... TOGETHER We Can (Un Castello per Tutti... INSIEME si può)
- Together for the Castle (Insieme per il Castello)
- Serravalle: A Castle to Experience Together (Serravalle: Un Castello da Vivere Insieme)
- I Love Serravalle (Amo Serravalle)

== Defunct parties ==
The family tree of the Sammarinese Socialist Party (PSS)

The family tree of the Sammarinese Christian Democratic Party (PDCS)

- Arengo and Freedom (Arengo e Libertà, AeL)
- Blue Movement (Movimento Azzurra, Azzurra)
- Centre Democrats (Democratici di Centro, DdC)
- City and Territory (Città e Territorio, CT)
- Committee for the Defense of the Republic (Comitato per la Difesa della Repubblica, CDR)
- Democratic Agreement - Republican Party (Intesa Democratica - Partito Repubblicano, ID-PR)
- Democratic and Socialist Reformers (Riformisti Democratici e Socialisti, RDeS): Formerly known as Socialists for Reform (Socialisti per le Riforme, SpR)
- Democratic Laboratory (Laboratorio Democratico, LABDEM)
- Democratic Movement - San Marino Together (Movimento Democratico - San Marino Insieme, MD-SMI)
- Democratic Party (Partito Democratico, PD)
- Democratic Reformers (Riformisti Democratici, RD)
- Democratic Sammarinese Union (Unione Sammarinese Democratica, USD)
- Democratic Socialist Left (Sinistra Socialista Democratica, SSD)
- Democratic Union (Unione Democratica, UD)
- Euro-Populars for San Marino (Europopolari per San Marino, EpS)
- Five Star Movement - San Marino (MoVimento 5 Stelle - San Marino, M5S-SM)
- For San Marino (Per San Marino, PSM): Formerly known as San Marino for the Sammarinese (San Marino ai Sammarinesi, SMS)
- Freely San Marino (LiberaMente San Marino, LMSM)
- Group of Liberal Reformers - House of Sammarinese Identity (Gruppo dei Riformatori Liberali - Casa delle Identità Sammarinesi, GdRL-CdIS)
- Ideas in Motion (Idee in Movimento, IM): Formerly known as Democratic Movement (Movimento Democratico, MD)
- Independent Patriotic Labor Association (Associazione Patriottica Indipendente del Lavoro, APIL)
- Left Party - Free Zone (Partito della Sinistra - Zona Franca, PdS-ZF)
- Let's Defend San Marino (Difendiamo San Marino, DSM)
- List of Free People (Lista delle Persone Libere, LdPL)
- Marxist-Leninist Communist Party of San Marino (Partito Comunista Marxista-Leninista di San Marino, PCMLSM): Formerly known as Marxist-Leninist Movement of San Marino (Movimento Marxista–Leninista di San Marino, MMLSM) and Communist Party of San Marino (Marxist-Leninist) (Partito Comunista di San Marino (Marxista-Leninista), PCSMML)
- Movement Civic10 (Movimento Civico10, Civico10)
- Movement for Constitutional Freedoms (Movimento per le Libertà Statuarie, MPS)
- Movement of the Oranges (Movimento degli Arancioni, gli Arancioni)
- New Left (Nuova Sinistra, NS)
- New Sammarinese Arengo (Nuovo Arengo Sammarinese, NAS)
- New Socialist Party (Nuovo Partito Socialista, NPS)
- Party of Democrats (Partito dei Democratici, PdD)
- Popular Alliance (Alleanza Popolare, AP): Formerly known as Popular Alliance of Sammarinese Democrats (Alleanza Popolare dei Democratici Sammarinesi, APDS) and Popular Alliance of Sammarinese Democrats for the Republic (Alleanza Popolare dei Democratici Sammarinesi per la Repubblica, APDSR)
- Progressives and Reformists (Progressisti e Riformisti, PeR)
- Reforms and Development (Riforme e Sviluppo, ReS)
- Republican Fasces of San Marino (Fascio Repubblicano di San Marino, FRS)
- Sammarinese Autonomous Socialist Group (Gruppo Socialisti Autonomi Sammarinesi, GSAS)
- Sammarinese Catholic Union (Unione Cattolica Sammarinese, UCS)
- Sammarinese Communist Party (Partito Comunista Sammarinese, PCS): Formerly known as The San Marino Section of the Italian Communist Party (Sezione di San Marino del Partito Comunista d’Italia, SdSMdPCI)
- Sammarinese Communist Refoundation (Rifondazione Comunista Sammarinese, RCS)
- Sammarinese Democratic Party (Partito Democratico Sammarinese, PDS)
- Sammarinese Democratic People's Party (Partito Democratico Popolare Sammarinese, PDPS)
- Sammarinese Democratic Progressive Party (Partito Progressista Democratico Sammarinese, PPDS)
- Sammarinese Democratic Rebirth (Rinascita Democratica Sammarinese, RDS): Formerly known as New San Marino (Nuova San Marino, NSM)
- Sammarinese Democratic Union (Unione Democratica Sammarinese, UDS)
- Sammarinese Fascist Party (Partito Fascista Sammarinese, PFS)
- Sammarinese First (Prima i Sammarinesi, PiS)
- Sammarineses for Freedom (Sammarinesi per la Libertà, SpL)
- Sammarinese Independence (Indipendenza Sammarinese, IS)
- Sammarinese Independent Socialist Party (Partito Socialista Independente Sammarinese, PSIS)
- Sammarinese Liberals (Liberal Sammarinesi, LS)
- Sammarinese Movement Social Right (Movimento Sammarinese Destra Sociale, MSDS)
- Sammarinese National Alliance (Alleanza Nazionale Sammarinese, ANS)
- Sammarinese National Party (Partito Nazionale Sammarinese, PNS)
- Sammarinese Moderates (Moderati Sammarinesi, MS): Formerly known as Sammarinese Populars (Popolari Sammarinesi, PS)
- Sammarinese People's Party (Partito Popolare Sammarinese, PPS)
- Sammarinese Reformist Socialist Party (Partito Socialista Riformista Sammarinese, PSRS)
- Sammarinese Republican Party (Partito Repubblicano Sammarinese, PRS)
- Sammarinese Socialist Democratic Party (Partito Socialista Democratico Sammarinese, PSDS): Formerly known as Socialist Democracy (Democrazia Socialista, DS)
- Sammarinese Socialist Party (Partito Socialista Sammarinese, PSS)
- Sammarinese without Borders (Sammarinesi senza Confini, SsC)
- San Marino 3.0 (San Marino 3.0, SM3.0)
- San Marino in Action (San Marino in Azione, SMA)
- San Marino League (Lega San Marino, LSM)
- San Marino of Values (San Marino dei Valori, SMdV)
- Socialist Agreement (Intesa Socialista, IS)
- Socialist Ideals Movement (Movimento Ideali Socialisti, MIS)
- Submarine Movement (Movimento Sottomarino, S8)
- Union for the Republic (Unione per la Repubblica, UpR)
- Union of Republican Forces (Unione delle Forze Repubblicane, UFR)
- Unitary Socialist Party (Partito Socialista Unitario, PSU): Formerly known as Sammarinese Democratic Socialist Party (Partito Socialista Democratico Sammarinese, PSDS) and Sammarinese Independent Democratic Socialist Party (Partito Socialista Democratico Indipendente Sammarinese, PSDIS)
- United Left (Sinistra Unita, SU)
- Volunteers of War (Volontari di Guerra, VdG)
- We Sammarineses (Noi Sammarinesi, NS)
- White-blue Movement (Movimento Biancoazzurro, MBA)

== Former coalitions and electoral lists ==
- Democratic Bloc (Blocco Democratico, BD): Alliance between independent liberals/reformists and PSS members
- Patriotic Bloc (Blocco Patriottico, BP): Alliance between PFS, PPS, UDS and VdG
- Unified List (Lista Unica, LU): Alliance between different political leaders and non-partisans
- Committee of Freedom (Comitato della Libertà, CdL): Alliance between PSS and PCS
- Sammarinese Popular Alliance (Alleanza Popolare Sammarinese, APS): Alliance between PDCS, UDS and APIL, later between PDCS and PSDIS
- PCS-NS: Electoral list
- PSU-IS: Electoral list
- Democratic Convention (Convezione Democratico, CD): Alliance between PPDS, IM and USD
- RDeS-IM: Electoral list
- Pact for San Marino (Patto per San Marino, PpSM): Alliance between PDCS, EPS, AeL, AP, NPS, NS, PS and ANS
- PDCS-EPS-AeL: Electoral list, part of Pact for San Marino (Patto per San Marino)
- Freedom List (Lista della Libertà, LdL): Electoral list between NPS and NS, part of Pact for San Marino (Patto per San Marino)
- Sammarinese Union of Moderates (Unione Sammarinese dei Moderati, USDM): Electoral list between PS and ANS, part of Pact for San Marino (Patto per San Marino)
- Reforms and Freedom (Riforme e Libertà, ReL): Alliance between PSD, SpL, RCS, PdS and DcD
- Centre-left (Centro-sinistra, C-S): Electoral list between PSD and SpL, part of Reforms and Freedom (Riforme e Libertà)
- United Left (Sinistra Unita, SU): Electoral list between RCS and PdS, part of Reforms and Freedom (Riforme e Libertà), later became a political party
- PSD-GdRL-CdIS-PRS: Electoral list
- LS-MS: Electoral list
- San Marino Common Good (San Marino Bene Comune, SMBC): Alliance between PDCS, NS, PSD and AP
- PDCS-NS: Electoral list, part of San Marino Common Good (San Marino Bene Comune)
- Agreement for the Country (Intesa per il Paese, IpiP): Alliance between PS, UPR, PS and ANS
- Active Citizenship (Cittadinanza Attiva, CA): Alliance between SU and Civico10
- Now.sm (Adesso.sm, A): Alliance between SU, PeR, LABDEM, AP, UPR and Civico10
- Democratic Socialist Left (Sinistra Socialista Democratica, SSD): Electoral list between SU, PeR and LABDEM, part of Now.sm (Adesso.sm), later became a political party
- Future Republic (Repubblica Futura, RF): Electoral list between AP and UPR, part of Now.sm (Adesso.sm), later became a political party
- San Marino First (San Marino prima di tutto, SMpdt): Alliance between PDCS, PS, PSD, NS and SsC
- Sammarinese (Sammarinesi, S): Electoral list between NS and SsC, part of San Marino First (San Marino prima di tutto)
- Democracy in Motion (Democrazia in Movimento, DiM): Alliance between RETE and MD-SMI
- Tomorrow in Motion (Domani in Movimento, DiM): Alliance between RETE and DML
- Free San Marino (Libera San Marino, Libera): Alliance between SSD, Civico10, MIS and ReS, later became a political party
- We for the Republic (Noi per la Repubblica, NplR): Alliance between NS, PSD, PS and MD-SMI
- Reformist Alliance (Alleanza Riformista, AR): Electoral list between NS, MIS and Elego, part of Democracy and Freedom (Democrazia e Libertà), later became a political party

== See also ==
- Politics of San Marino
- List of political parties by country
