= Pasquale Valentini =

Sammarinese politician (born 1953)

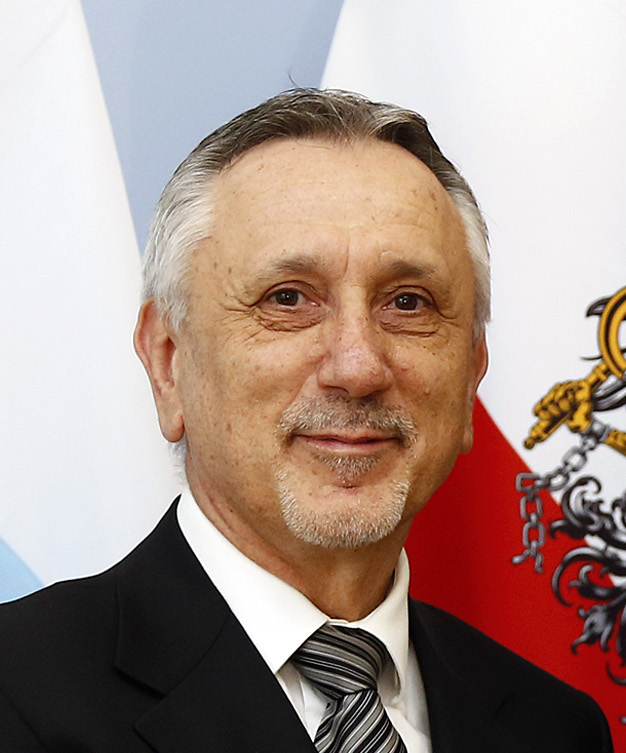
- Valentini in 2014

President of the Sammarinese Christian Democratic Party
- In office 19 November 2020 – 6 December 2024
- Secretary: Gian Carlo Venturini
- Preceded by: Luca Beccari
- Succeeded by: Alice Mina

Secretary for Foreign and Political Affairs
- In office 5 December 2012 – 27 December 2016
- Preceded by: Antonella Mularoni
- Succeeded by: Nicola Renzi

Secretary for Finance and Budget
- In office 30 April 2010 – 5 December 2012
- Preceded by: Gabriele Gatti
- Succeeded by: Claudio Felici

Political Secretary of the Sammarinese Christian Democratic Party
- In office 26 February 2007 – 29 November 2010
- President: Lorenzo Lonfernini
- Preceded by: Pier Marino Menicucci
- Succeeded by: Marco Gatti

Secretary for Public Education, University and Cultural Institutes
- In office 17 December 2002 – 15 December 2003
- In office 13 July 2001 – 25 June 2002

Additional positions
- 1988-2024: Member of the Grand and General Council

Personal details
- Born: 19 July 1953 (age 73) Serravalle, San Marino
- Party: Sammarinese Christian Democratic Party (since 1988)
- Children: 3
- Education: University of Bologna
- Profession: Politician; educator

Pasquale Valentini (born 19 July 1953) is a Sammarinese retired politician and educator who served as Secretary for Foreign and Political Affairs from 2012 to 2016. A member of the Sammarinese Christian Democratic Party, he previously served as Secretary for Public Education on two occasions between 2001 and 2003 and as Secretary for Finance and Budget from 2010 to 2012.

== Early life and education ==
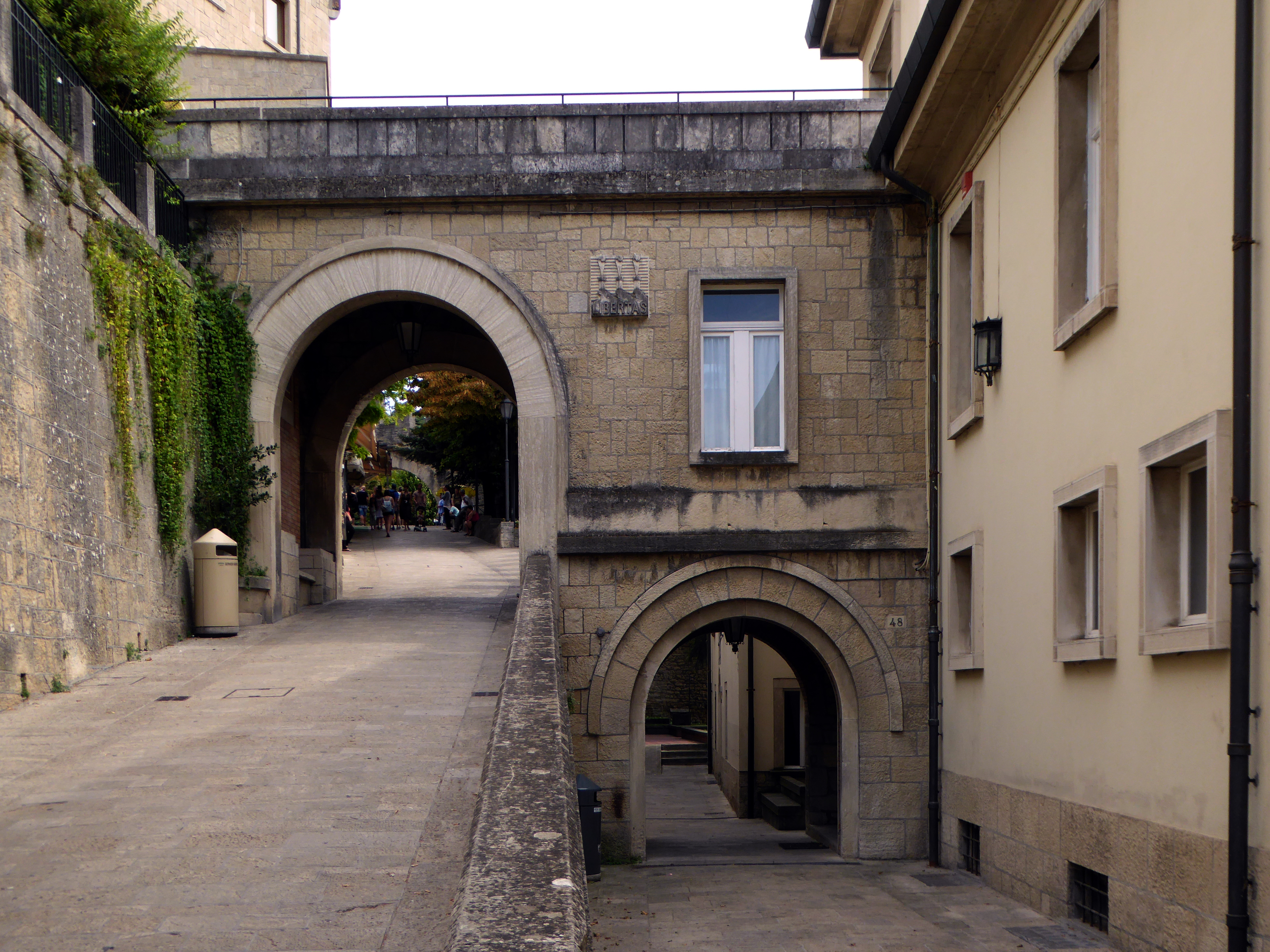
Scuola Secondaria Superiore, where Valentini studied (pictured in 2015)

Pasquale Valentini was born in Serravalle, San Marino on 19 July 1953. He obtained a classical high school diploma from San Marino in 1972 before graduating in mathematics from the University of Bologna in 1977.

Between 1977 and 1993, Valentini worked as a teacher at the public Lower Secondary School (Scuole Medie Inferiori), where he taught Mathematics, Chemistry, Physics, and Natural Sciences. In 1993, he became the Chair of Mathematics at the Upper Secondary School (Scuola Secondaria Superiore). From October 2004 to February 2007, he served as the principal for the 1st and 3rd districts of the Lower Secondary School.

During the 1970s and 1980s, Valentini was an active trade unionist, having held multiple positions in the Democratic Confederation of San Marino Workers, a national trade union center affiliated with the International Trade Union Confederation. He had also founded, alongside some of his friends, the Cultural Cooperative "Il Sentiero" and had taken on the role of director of the School of Social Doctrine.

== Early political career ==
Valentini was first elected to the Grand and General Council in the 1988 San Marino general election as a member of the Sammarinese Christian Democratic Party (PDCS), at 34 years old. He successfully retained his seat in all the elections held since then. During his tenure, he served in multiple of the council's Permanent Committees, including the ones on Justice, Education, Culture and Cultural Heritage; University and Scientific Research; Sports; and Tourism.

After the PDCS failed to achieve a majority in the 2001 election and entered into a coalition with the Sammarinese Socialist Party, Valentini was appointed as Secretary of State for Public Education, University and Cultural Institutes. He served in that position during the course of the XXV Legislature, from July 2001 to June 2002 and subsequently from December 2002 to December 2003. He was made a member of the Christian Democratic Party's coordination group in January 2004.

In February 2007, Valentini was elected as the Political Secretary of the Christian Democratic Party for a three-year term after defeating rival Lorenzo Lonfernini, securing 211 votes to Lonfernini's 187. Following his victory, Valentini immediately extended an invitation to Lonfernini to serve as his Deputy Secretary. However, Lonfernini was ultimately elected President of the Central Council of the PDCS on 12 March of that year. Valentini held his position until he was succeeded by Marco Gatti following the 18th party congress, convened in November 2010.

Heading into the 2008 general election, the PDCS led a centre-right alliance of eight political parties, which formed the Pact for San Marino. Valentini outlined the priorities for the first 100 days of a potencial government, saying that the coalition would focus on "revitalizing relations with Italy" to foster economic stability and clarity, which he saw as crucial for San Marino's vital sectors. He proposed initiatives in social welfare and family support, aiming for a balanced state that empowers civic responsibility while facilitating societal resilience. In November, the coalition won an absolute majority of seats in the Grand and General Council.

On 12 November, three days after the election, Valentini gave a speech at the World Trade Center, where he stated that "the satisfaction of that moment was full of uncertainty about what the experience of government would mean". In his speech, he emphasized the primary goal of ensuring the operational stability of San Marino's banking system, highlighting the progress made in emerging from the crisis. Acknowledging the ongoing global financial crisis, he expressed the need to rethink San Marino's development, "grow the real economy, and combat all distorting elements".

On 30 April 2010, Valentini was appointed as Secretary of State for Finance and Budget with additional charges of Philatelic and Numismatics Division, following the resignation of Gabriele Gatti. It was reported that the nomination had emerged from a previous meeting of the coalition leadership on 6 February. Valentini was elected by the Grand and General Council by a vote of 32–21, with two abstentions. Immediately after his election, Valentini was sworn into office before the Captains Regent, Marco Conti and Glauco Sansovini.

== Secretary for Foreign and Political Affairs (2012–2016) ==
=== Election ===
Ahead of the 2012 general election, the Christian Democratic Party led the formation of a new coalition alongside the Party of Socialists and Democrats, the Popular Alliance and We Sammarineses, which was named San Marino Common Good. In November, the won a 3-seat simple majority and a total of 35 seats. Valentini was then appointed as the role of Secretary for Foreign and Political Affairs with additional responsibility for Tourism. The new Congress of State for the XXVIII Legislature was sworn at the Grand and General Council in 5 December.

=== Relations with the European Union ===
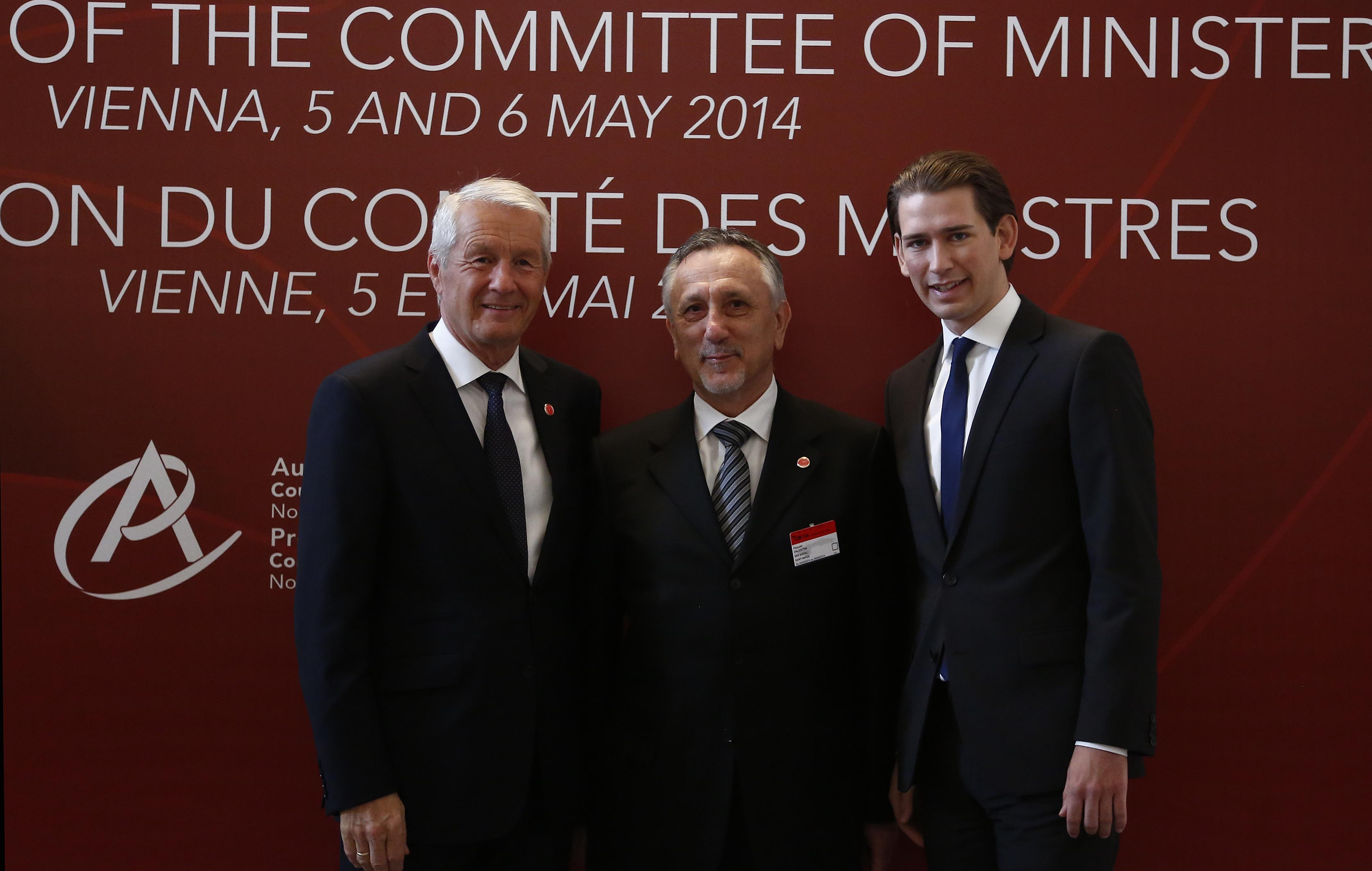
Valentini with Secretary General of the Council of Europe Thorbjørn Jagland and Foreign Minister of Austria Sebastian Kurz, 6 May 2014

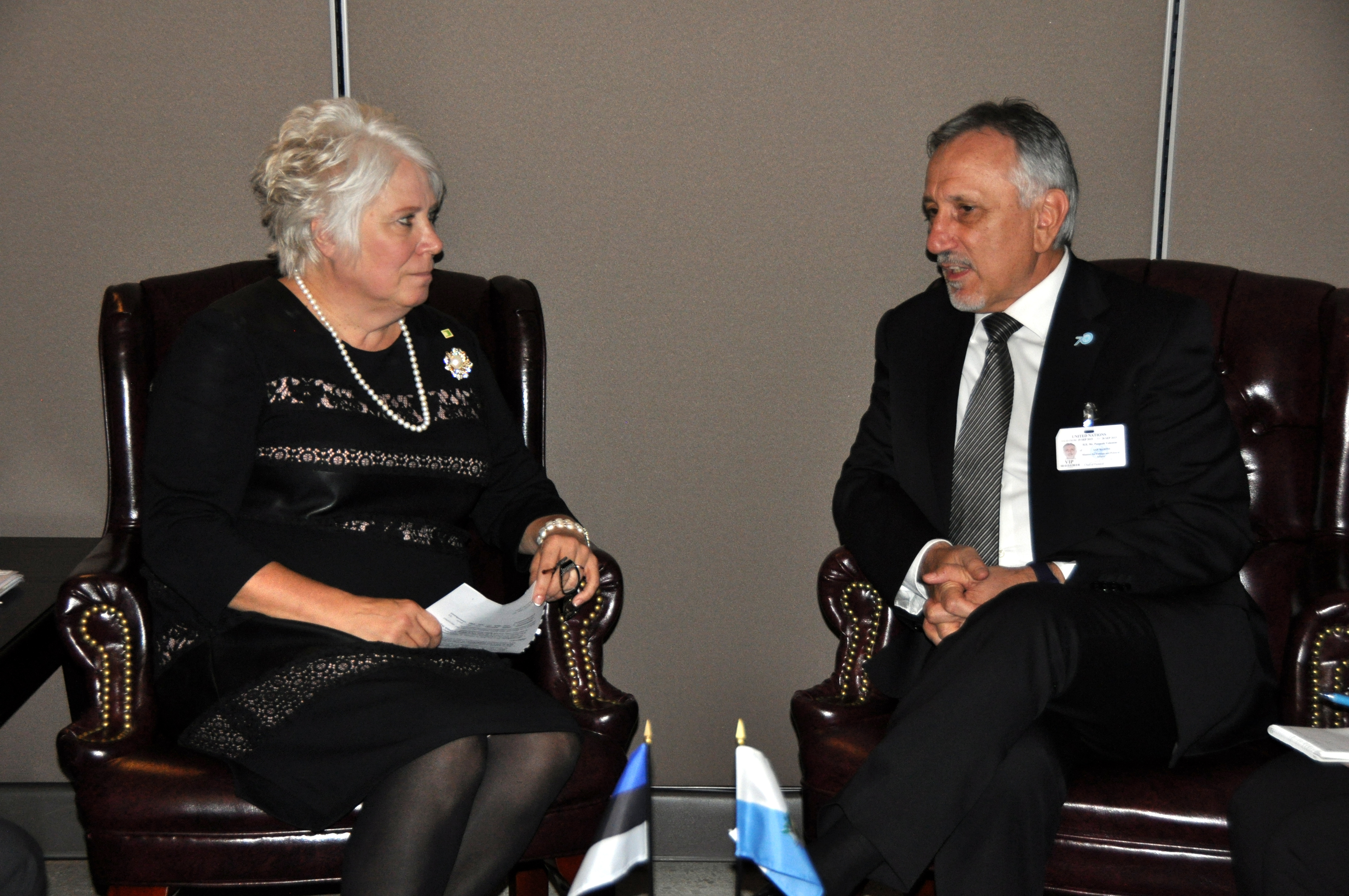
Valentini with Estonian Foreign Minister Marina Kaljurand in New York City, 27 September 2015

Valentini supported establishing a relationship with the European Union that allows San Marino access to opportunities available to member states while accepting EU standards, provided they are sustainable for San Marino. In an interview with Libertas, he stated that the relationship should be based on "the search for access to opportunities offered to member states in exchange for accepting community standards, with the EU recognizing the conditions of sustainability for our state."

In February 2014, Valentini convened with department directors of the Public Administration of San Marino to discuss the initial phase of negotiations with the EU for a potential Association Agreement. Valentini highlighted the necessity of assessing and addressing the specific needs and characteristics of various sectors within the Public Administration in alignment with European Union law. The meeting was part of the preparations for an upcoming visit by a Delegation of Community Services to San Marino on 7 March, the aim of which was to present a recommendation to the Council of the European Union by April to initiate negotiations for one or more association agreements with San Marino, Andorra, and Monaco.

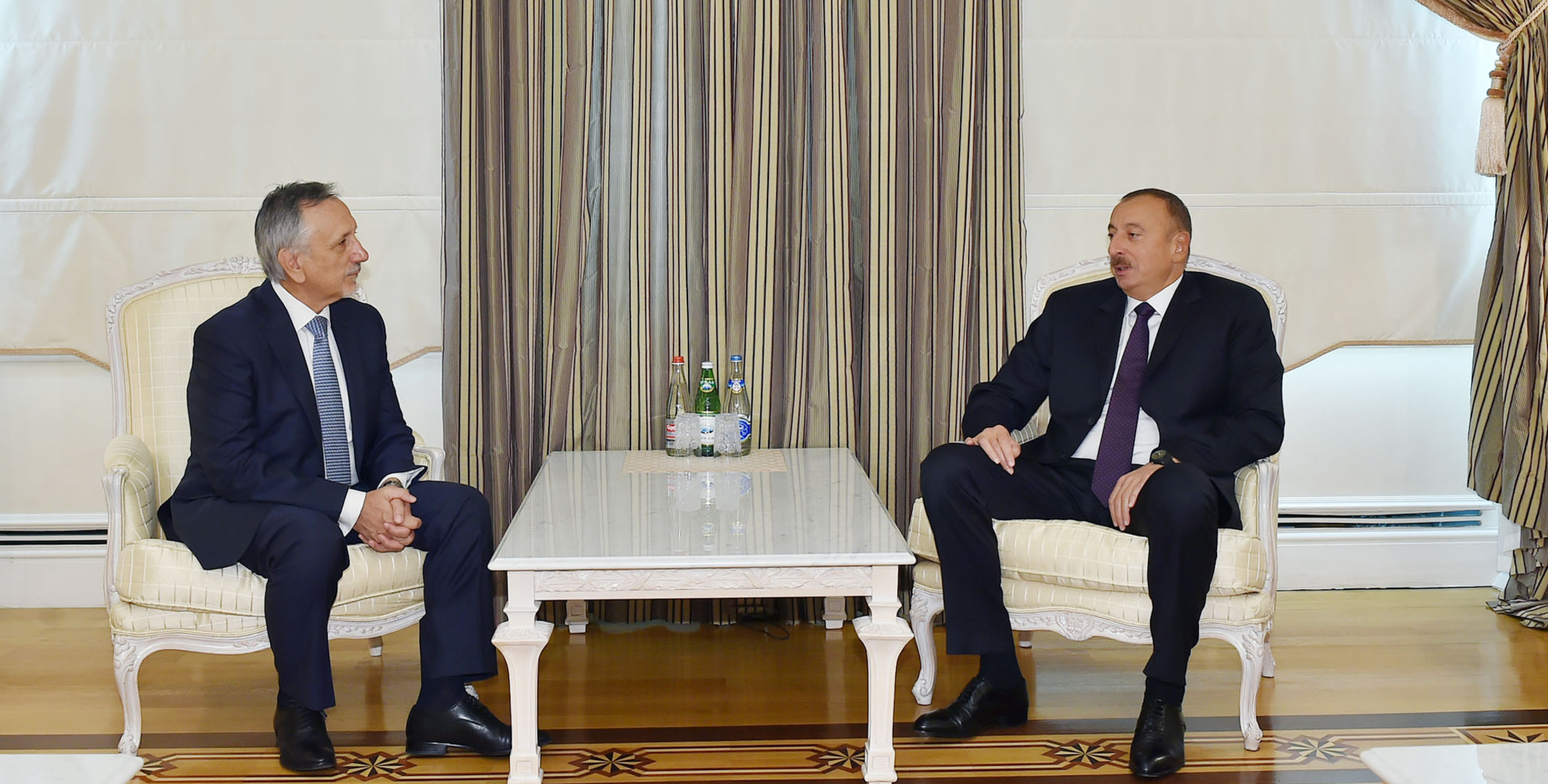
Valentini with Azerbaijani President Ilham Aliyev, 8 September 2015

=== Banca Commerciale Sammarinese financial scandal ===
In June 2015, Valentini addressed allegations regarding his involvement in a banking issue at Banca Commerciale Sammarinese, which had faced scrutiny following the revocation of its banking licenses by the Central Bank of San Marino due to management and risk management issues. Valentini stated that an article published by L'Informazione di San Marino, a local daily newspaper, had suggested potential embarrassment over a bank transfer issue during Valentini's earlier tenure as Secretary of State for Finance. He later clarified that during the period when the Central Bank administered the bank in 2012, his intervention was prompted by a complaint letter concerning a blocked payment. Valentini stated that his role was limited to seeking information from the Central Bank to address the issue appropriately.

=== Succession ===
Following the defeat of the Sammarinese Christian Democratic Party and the San Marino First alliance at the second round of the 2016 general election, Valentini's tenure as foreign minister came to an end. He was succeeded by Nicola Renzi of the Future Republic party.

== Later political career (2016–present) ==
Valentini has continued to be active in San Marino's political and public life. On 19 November 2020, he was unanimously appointed as the President of the Central Council of the Sammarinese Christian Democratic Party during the 21st party congress. At the same event, the party designated another eight members of the Central Council's leadership.

=== 2021 Abortion referendum ===
Results of the 2021 San Marino abortion referendum. The PDCS stood against the proposed measures

In January 2021, Valentini, now President of the PDCS, issued a statement addressing a legislative proposal concerning the legalization of voluntary termination of pregnancy in San Marino. He expressed concerns about the ethical implications and societal impacts of the legislation, questioning "whether it aligns with principles of human rights and societal responsibility" and emphasizing the need for clarity and coherence in legislative objectives, particularly regarding the rights and responsibilities involved in matters of reproductive health. Valentini also raised ethical questions about the rights of the unborn and the societal implications of legalizing abortion, advocating for a thorough examination of these issues through dialogue and reasoned debate.

On March of that year, after the RETE Movement and the Women's Union of San Marino collected the necessary signatures, a referendum on legalising abortion up to the 12th week of gestation was announced. Despite opposition from Valentini's Christian Democratic Party, 77.3% of voters supported the proposal, leading to its approval. Consequently, the law came into effect on 12 September 2022.

=== Public Employment Reform ===
In November 2023, Valentini publicly expressed his concerns about the renewal of the public employees' employment contract, particularly regarding the proposed reforms that could alter the quality and function of the employment relationship. Valentini emphasized the importance of parliamentary discussion and deliberation for such significant changes, highlighting the need for transparency and participation in the political process. He also supported the trade unions' request to exclude certain reforms from the contract until they could be properly discussed in the appropriate forums.

=== EU Association Agreement negotiations ===
In December 2023, Valentini commented on the closing negotiations for the European Union Association Agreement with San Marino, marking it as a significant phase for San Marino. He highlighted the importance of the agreement and the responsibility of the nation to implement it effectively to ensure that the opportunities it offered were fully realized. Valentini called for shared responsibility and careful study of the agreement to leverage its special advantages.

=== Retirement from Parliament ===
In March 2024, ahead of the general election, Valentini announced that he would not seek reelection after 37 years in the Grand and General Council. In his address, he appealed to both political forces and citizens, stressing the importance of participation in democracy, stating that "democracy extends beyond elections and involves ensuring citizen involvement in governance". Valentini also warned against political disaffection, urging citizens to stay engaged to prevent misuse of power, and emphasized the need for collective commitment to address the country's challenges and to strive for the common good.

== Personal life ==
Valentini is married and has 3 children. He has expressed his admiration for three Sammarinese political figures: Giovanni Zaccaria Savoretti, Federico Bigi, and Clara Boscaglia, who have inspired his own political journey. On the international stage, he respects former Christian Democratic Italian Prime Minister Alcide De Gasperi's political action, saying that he does "for his faith, for his human stature, for his capacity for political vision".

Valentini is a member of the Catholic Church, which has shaped his political beliefs immensely. Valentini has said that his entrance to politics and public service can be attributed to his faith, stating that "it was built over time thanks above all to the education received and the concrete possibility of experimenting with Christianity as a hypothesis for living all aspects of existence in an adequate, meaningful and convenient way". His beliefs have also guided his priorities, with Valentini having personally focused on family policies that protect their role in society. Valentini believes that neglecting family bonds contributes to insecurity and fear among younger generations.

Valentini is a football enthusiast and also enjoys leisure activities like drawing and playing the guitar. He finds these hobbies valuable for fostering connections with others, saying that "the lesson I have learned from them is that what we have as a gift multiplies if it is put into play."
