= Recognition of same-sex unions in San Marino =

San Marino has recognized civil unions for same-sex and opposite-sex couples since 5 December 2018. Legislation to permit civil unions was introduced to the Grand and General Council in December 2017, and was approved on 15 November 2018 by a vote of 40 to 4. Civil unions provide comparable rights to marriage in the areas of residency, citizenship, pension, health care, succession, and stepchild adoption. The law came into full effect on 11 February 2019, following a number of further legal and administrative changes.

== Immigration rights ==
On 21 June 2012, the Grand and General Council approved a popular initiative (istanza d'arengo) by a 33–20 vote requesting the government to allow foreign nationals in same-sex relationships with San Marino citizens to remain in the country legally. The initiative did not ask for any other rights for these couples, but its approval was still hailed as a "historic step forward" by Michele Pazzini, the secretary of a San Marino LGBT association. Pazzini said: "This is a little step towards the full recognition of same-sex couples." Its approval was criticized by the Bishop of San Marino-Montefeltro, Luigi Negri, who argued that it sought to "change the concept of cohabitation so that sex no longer matters". Pazzini responded that Negri "[did] not [seem to] know that two men or two women can live quietly under the same roof [in San Marino]", and that "Sammarinese frequently fall in love with non-Sammarinese nationals", thus making this law change necessary to ensure equality. He also replied to criticism from the Sammarinese Christian Democratic Party, whose representatives indicated that "the petition did not respond to any real societal need", saying that the party "does not know and perhaps has not even bothered to analyze the problems related to this discrimination", arguing that LGBT people were being treated as "third-class citizens". Pazzini also mentioned that it had taken four years for the government to finally address the initiative. Nonetheless, no law amendments were introduced in the following years.

== Civil unions ==
Laws regarding same-sex partnerships in Europe¹ Marriage Civil union Limited domestic recognition (cohabitation) Unrecognized Constitution limits marriage to opposite-sex couples ¹ May include recent laws or court decisions that have not yet entered into effect.

=== Legislative action ===
In March 2016, three political parties announced their intention to introduce separate bills to Parliament to create a new gender-neutral partnership law that would expand the rights of all unmarried cohabiting couples. The largest party, San Marino Common Good, ruled out adoption rights for same-sex couples, while an opposition party included adoption in its draft. The center-left coalition partner, United Left, said that it was open to the idea of same-sex parenting and may bring the issue of stepchild adoption to a fourth proposal.

In December 2017, after winning the November 2016 election, the center-left coalition—consisting of United Left, Future Republic and Civic 10—vowed to pass a civil union bill. A popular initiative to legalise civil unions (Italian: unione civile, pronounced [uˈnjoːne tʃiˈviːle]; Romagnol: uniòun civìla, pronounced [uˈnjɔuŋ tʃiˈvilɐ]) was introduced to the Grand and General Council on 18 December 2017, and passed its first reading on 7 March 2018. Under the proposed law, civil partners would be granted health care benefits, pension rights and enjoy the same residency rights as married couples, among other rights and benefits. The proposal was praised for going further than the Italian civil union law, approved in 2016, as it would allow for stepchild adoption. Additionally, children born during the civil union would be legally recognised as the children of both parents, and children born abroad would also be recognised. A public consultation took place on 6 April 2018. The government indicated that it would try to have the bill passed "as soon as possible". On 27 September 2018, the Council Committee for Constitutional Affairs approved the bill by a 12–2 vote with some amendments; while now allowing for public ceremonies, the committee conferred to the unions only a limited set of rights pertaining to marriage—residency, citizenship, pension rights, health care, succession rights, and stepchild adoption rights.

On 15 November 2018, the Grand and General Council approved the bill at final reading by 40 votes to 4 with 4 abstentions. The law was signed by Captains Regent Mirko Tomassoni and Luca Santolini, and published in the Official Bulletin of the Republic of San Marino on 20 November. It entered into force on 5 December 2018. However, before fully coming into effect, the bill required a delegated decree adding the necessary legal basis and a series of administrative adjustments to be adopted by the Congress of State. Director of the Civil Status Lorella Stefanelli said that February 2019 was a likely date for commencement. In February 2019, Guerrino Zanotti, the Secretary of State for Internal Affairs, said the delegated decree would be adopted by the Congress of State within the next few days, allowing the Civil Status to implement the new law. The decree was ratified on 11 February. The first civil union took place on 25 February 2019 between Emanuele Leuzzi and Marco Cervellini at the Civil Registry Office in Valdragone, Borgo Maggiore. The Grand and General Council passed a bill 31–1 on 21 June 2021 further expanding the rights and benefits of civil partners. However, the law, which took effect on 29 June, does not grant same-sex couples full adoption rights.

=== Statistics ===
In 2019, 36 civil unions were performed in San Marino, of which 13 were between same-sex couples. In 2021, there were 95 marriages and 21 civil unions performed in San Marino.

== Same-sex marriage ==
=== Background ===
In April 2014, a Sammarinese man, who had married his partner in the United Kingdom, filed a petition to start a debate on the recognition of foreign same-sex marriages in San Marino. On 19 September 2014, Parliament debated and rejected the proposed changes on a vote of 15–35. On 8 April 2015, the same man attempted to register his marriage in the country, but was not successful. In December 2017, the Parliament approved an amendment to a proposed 2018 budget law, by 25 votes to 20, that would have allowed same-sex marriages for foreigners in San Marino. However, the government did not draft the required legislation to implement the amendment.

At San Marino's third Universal Periodic Review in November 2019, the Netherlands recommended that the government legalize same-sex marriage. The government "noted" (rejected) this recommendation.

=== Religious performance ===
The Union of Methodist and Waldensian Churches, which serves the small Protestant minority in San Marino, was the first Christian denomination to authorise the blessing of same-sex couples in 2010. The Catholic Church opposes same-sex marriage and does not allow its priests to officiate at such marriages. In December 2023, the Holy See published Fiducia supplicans, a declaration allowing Catholic priests to bless couples who are not considered to be married according to church teaching, including the blessing of same-sex couples.

== Public opinion ==
A 2016 survey by La Tribuna Sammarinese found that 78% of Sammarinese were in favour of same-sex civil unions.

== See also ==
- LGBTQ rights in San Marino
- Recognition of same-sex unions in Europe
