= Sammarinese National Alliance =

Sammarinese National Alliance Alleanza Nazionale Sammarinese
- Leader: Glauco Sansovini
- Founded: 2001 (original ANS), 2012 (re-founded ANS)
- Dissolved: 2012 (original ANS), 2012 (re-founded ANS)
- Merged into: Sammarinese Christian Democratic Party (original ANS)
- Succeeded by: Sammarinese Social Right Movement (re-founded ANS)
- Headquarters: Via 28 luglio, 187 - Borgo Maggiore
- Ideology: National conservatism
- Political position: Right-wing
- Colours: Blue, White

Sammarinese National Alliance (Italian: Alleanza Nazionale Sammarinese, ANS) was a national-conservative political party in San Marino. Its Italian counterpart was the National Alliance.

In the 2006 general election ANS won 2.3% of the vote and 1 out of 60 seats in the Grand and General Council (+0.4% from 2001). Since 2008 it was part of the Sammarinese Union of Moderates together with Sammarinese Populars and stood in opposition to the 2006–2008 coalition government consisting of the Party of Socialists and Democrats, the Popular Alliance and the United Left.

In the 2008 general election the party participated within the Sammarinese Union of Moderates coalition that won 874 votes (4.17%) and got 2 seats. The Sammarinese Union of Moderates was part of the centre-right Pact for San Marino coalition which won 35 seats out of 60 in the Grand and General Council in the Sammarinese parliamentary election, 2008 gaining 54.22% of the national vote. The Sammarinese National Alliance itself gained a few seats and a small percentage of the national vote as part of the coalition.

The party and the Union won no seats in election of 2012.

After being briefly transited in the Sammarinese Christian Democratic Party, ANS was re-established in 2012, thus resuming full autonomy.

On 1 October 2013 it was finally dissolved and gave rise to the Sammarinese Movement Social Right.
