= Nicola Renzi =

Sammarinese politician (born 1979)

Nicola Renzi OSI
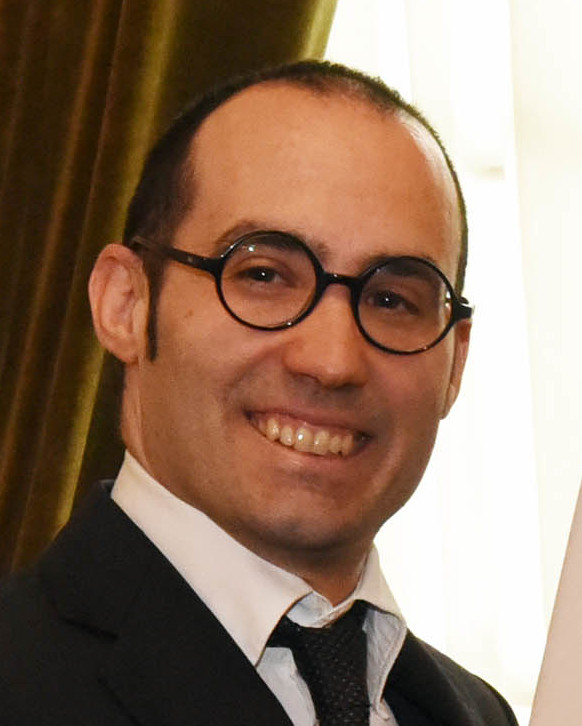
- Renzi in 2018

Secretary for Foreign and Political Affairs
- In office 27 December 2016 – 8 January 2020
- Preceded by: Pasquale Valentini
- Succeeded by: Luca Beccari

Captain Regent of San Marino
- In office 1 October 2015 – 1 April 2016; Served with Lorella Stefanelli
- Preceded by: Andrea Belluzzi; Roberto Venturini
- Succeeded by: Massimo Andrea Ugolini; Gian Nicola Berti

Coordinator of Popular Alliance
- In office 2 March 2013 – 24 February 2017
- President: Antonella Mularoni
- Preceded by: Stefano Palmieri
- Succeeded by: Party dissolved

Member of the Grand and General Council
- Incumbent
- Assumed office 5 December 2012

Personal details
- Born: 18 July 1979 (age 47) City of San Marino, San Marino
- Party: Future Republic (since 2016)
- Other political affiliations: AP (before 2016)
- Children: 1
- Education: University of Bologna; University of the Republic of San Marino (PhD)

Nicola Renzi (born 18 July 1979) is a Sammarinese politician and educator who served as Secretary of State for Foreign and Political Affairs from 2016 to 2020. A member of Future Republic, he previously served as Captain Regent from 2015 to 2016, alongside Lorella Stefanelli.

== Early life and career ==
Renzi was born in San Marino on 18 July 1979. He pursued higher education in the humanities and later obtained a PhD in History from the Scuola Superiore di Studi Storici di San Marino. His doctoral research focused on the works of Seneca and aspects of Roman history.

Between 2003 and 2004, he worked as a teacher of Latin and Greek at San Marino High School, beginning a professional career in education and historical scholarship. He is married and has one child.

== Political career ==
Renzi first stood for election to the Grand and General Council in the 2012 general election as a candidate of the Popular Alliance. Within the party, he rose rapidly through the leadership ranks and was elected as Coordinator of the Popular Alliance on 2 March 2013.

In October 2015, he was elected Captain Regent of San Marino, serving a six-month term as one of the country’s joint heads of state together with Lorella Stefanelli.

In 2016, Renzi was among the founders of Future Republic, a political movement formed through the merger of the Union for the Republic and Popular Alliance. The new party became a central component of the Adesso.sm centre-left coalition.

Following the 2016 general election, Adesso.sm defeated the Sammarinese Christian Democratic Party–led coalition in a historic second-round. Renzi played a leading role in coalition negotiations and was subsequently appointed Secretary of State for Foreign and Political Affairs, a position he held from December 2016 until January 2020. Although he retained his seat in the 2019 election, the governing coalition fragmented and was defeated, bringing an end to his tenure in government. Renzi was subsequently re-elected to the legislature in the 2024 election.

== Honours ==
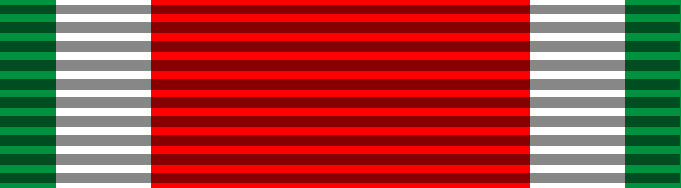
- Order of the Star of Italy (Italy, 2018)

== See also ==
- List of foreign ministers in 2017
- List of current foreign ministers

Political offices
Preceded by Pasquale Valentini	Secretary of State for Foreign Affairs; 2016–2020	Succeeded by Luca Beccari
