= Democratic Socialist Left =

Democratic Socialist Left Sinistra Socialista Democratica
- President: Michele Muratori
- Secretary: Alessandro Bevitori
- Founded: November 2016 (electoral list); 17 November 2017 (party)
- Dissolved: 30 December 2020
- Merger of: United Left; Progressives and Reformists; Democratic Laboratory
- Merged into: Libera San Marino
- Headquarters: Via delle Tamerici, 1/A – Domagnano
- Ideology: Social democracy Democratic socialism
- Political position: Centre-left to left-wing
- National affiliation: Libera
- Italian counterpart: Italian Left
- Colours: Red
- Grand and General Council: 5 / 60

Website
- ssd.sm

Democratic Socialist Left (Italian: Sinistra Socialista Democratica, SSD) was a political party in San Marino, founded as an electoral list for the 2016 general election, including United Left, Progressives and Reformists and Democratic Laboratory. The three parties officially merged into a single party in November 2017. The party was dissolved on 30 December 2020 to merge into with Libera San Marino.

== History ==
Democratic Socialist Left was founded in November 2016 as an electoral list composed of the United Left, Progressives and Reformists and Democratic Laboratory. Together with Future Republic (a list uniting Popular Alliance and Union for the Republic) and Civic 10 they formed the coalition Adesso.sm.

The coalition won the 2016 general election, defeating the ruling coalition San Marino First (formed by the Sammarinese Christian Democratic Party, the Party of Socialists and Democrats, the Socialist Party and the Sammarinese list), while the SSD list won 14 seats in the Grand and General Council.

On 10 November 2017 United Left celebrated its last congress, which overwhelmingly passed a motion calling to dissolve the party and turn SSD into a full political party. On 17 November 2017 the first congress of Democratic Socialist Left was celebrated, officially merging the three parties into a single political entity and electing Michele Muratori as party president and Eva Guidi as secretary.

In October 2018 Guidi stepped down as party secretary to join the Sammarinese Government; she was replaced in November by Alessandro Bevitori.

On 30 December 2020, the Democratic Socialist Left was dissolved in order to merge into the Libera San Marino party.

== Electoral history ==
Grand and General Council
Election	Leader	Votes	%	Seats	+/–	Government
2016	Eva Guidi	2,352	12.11 (#3)	14 / 60	▲9	Coalition
2019	Michele Muratori	2,964	16.49 (#3) (Libera)	5 / 60	▼9	Opposition
