= 2014 San Marino referendum =

On 25 May 2014, the government of San Marino held two referendums. Voters were asked whether they approved of repealing laws on pensions reform and on medical practice, both of which were passed by the legislature in October 2013. Voters approved both proposals by nearly 80 percent of the vote.

== Background ==
Prior to the referendums, the quorum required for a proposal to be approved was reduced from 32% of voters to 25%. Meaning that 8,398 voters had to vote in favour for the proposals to be approved. Both of the referendums were to repeal laws passed by the Grand and General Council on 23 October 2013.

== Campaign ==
The first group to campaign for or against the referendums was the then ruling San Marino First coalition, consisting of the Sammarinese Christian Democratic Party, the Party of Socialists and Democrats, and the Popular Alliance. The coalition was against both of the proposals. The Socialist Party supported repealing the medical practice law, criticizing it stating that it "liberalizes the medical profession". The party hoped for high turnout saying it would be a victory for "freedom and democracy". The Union for the Republic (UPR) also supported the repeal of the medical practice law. The UPR opposed repealing the pensions law.

== Results ==
The voting was held on 25 May 2014. Both of the referendums were approved in a landslide receiving around 80 percent of the vote. They were both voted on by 42.15 percent of eligible voters.

=== Repealing the pensions reform law ===
The pensions reform law was repealed with 79.48 percent of the vote.

| Choice | Votes | % | Ref |
|---|---|---|---|
| For | 11,026 | 79.48 | |
| Against | 2,847 | 20.52 | |
| Invalid/blank votes | 284 | – | |
| Total | 14,157 | 100 | |
| Registered voters/turnout | 33,591 | 42.15 | |

=== Repealing the medical practice law ===
The medical practice law was repealed with 78.04 percent of the vote.

| Choice | Votes | % | Ref |
|---|---|---|---|
| For | 10,881 | 78.04 | |
| Against | 3,061 | 21.96 | |
| Invalid/blank votes | 215 | —N/a | |
| Total | 14,157 | 100 | |
| Registered voters/turnout | 33,591 | 42.15 | |
