= Sammarinese Populars =

Sammarinese Populars Popolari Sammarinesi
- Leader: Angela Venturini
- Founded: 4 February 2003
- Split from: Sammarinese Christian Democratic Party
- Headquarters: Via 25 marzo, 19/b – Domagnano
- Ideology: Christian democracy National conservatism
- Political position: Centre-right
- National affiliation: Sammarinese Union of Moderates
- Italian counterpart: Union of the Centre
- Colours: Blue, White

Website
- www.popolarisammarinesi.sm

Sammarinese Populars (Italian: Popolari Sammarinesi, PS) are a Christian-democratic political party in San Marino.

== History ==
In the 2006 general election PS won 2.4% of the vote and 1 out of 60 seats in the Grand and General Council. Since 2008 it has been part of the Sammarinese Union of Moderates together with Sammarinese National Alliance and stood in opposition against the 2006-2008 coalition government of the Party of Socialists and Democrats, Popular Alliance and United Left.

In the 2008 general election the party participated within the Sammarinese Union of Moderates coalition that won 874 votes (4.17%) and got 2 seats. The Sammarinese Union of Moderates is part of the centre-right Pact for San Marino electoral coalition, which won 35 seats out of 60 in the Grand and General Council in the 2008 election, gaining 54.22% of the national vote and a governmental majority of 5 and has become the new government of San Marino and as a result the Sammarinese Populars which itself gained a few seats and a small percentage of the national vote as part of the coalition and as part of the Sammarinese Union of Moderates, is now part of the official new government.
