= 2019 San Marino general election =

National election

- 8 December 2019
- All 60 seats in the Grand and General Council; 31 seats needed for a majority
- Turnout: 55.73% (▼3.93pp)
Party	Leader	Vote %	Seats	+/–
PDCS	Gian Carlo Venturini	33.35	21	+11
RETE	Gloria Arcangeloni	18.23	11	+3
Libera	Matteo Ciacci	16.49	10	−14
NpIR	Denise Bronzetti	13.13	8	+2
RF	Mario Venturini	10.29	6	−5
DML	Lorenzo Forcellini Reffi	6.19	4	New
This lists parties that won seats. See the complete results below.
Results by castelli
Secretary for Foreign Affairs before	Secretary for Foreign Affairs after election
Nicola Renzi; RF	Luca Beccari; PDCS

General elections were held in San Marino on 8 December 2019.

== Electoral system ==
The 60 members of the Grand and General Council are elected by proportional representation, with seats allocated using the d'Hondt method. The electoral threshold is calculated by multiplying the number of parties running in the elections by 0.4, with a maximum possible threshold of 3.5%.

If no party receives a majority, or the two largest parties are unable to form a coalition government within thirty days of the elections, a runoff election will be held between the two most popular coalitions, with the winner receiving a majority jackpot to give them a majority. It is the first time the facultative second round will be applied following its approval in a June 2019 referendum.

== Campaign ==
Two electoral alliances were formed for the elections:

- Libera, an alliance of the Democratic Socialist Left, Civic 10, Socialist Ideals Movement and Reforms and Development
- We for the Republic, an alliance of the Socialist Party, Party of Socialists and Democrats, Democratic Movement San Marino Together and We Sammarineses

== Results ==
Party or alliance		Votes	%	Seats	+/–
Sammarinese Christian Democratic Party		5,993	33.35	21	+11
Tomorrow in Motion	RETE Movement	3,276	18.23	11	+3
Tomorrow in Motion	Domani Motus Liberi	1,112	6.19	4	New
Tomorrow in Motion	Coalition votes	57	0.32	0	–
Tomorrow in Motion	Total	4,445	24.73	15	+3
Libera San Marino		2,964	16.49	10	–14
We for the Republic		2,359	13.13	8	+2
Future Republic		1,850	10.29	6	–5
Elego		361	2.01	0	New
Total		17,972	100.00	60	0
Valid votes		17,972	93.44		
Invalid/blank votes		1,262	6.56		
Total votes		19,234	100.00		
Registered voters/turnout		34,511	55.73		
Source: State Secretariat for Internal Affairs and Public Function

== Aftermath ==
Following the elections, a coalition government was formed by the Sammarinese Christian Democratic Party, the Tomorrow in Motion alliance and We for the Republic.

Member	Party	Portfolio
Luca Beccari	PCDS	Secretary of State for Foreign Affairs, for International Economic Cooperation and Telecommunications
Elena Tonnini	RETE Movement	Secretary of State for Internal Affairs, the Civil Service, Institutional Affairs and Relations with the Municipalities
Marco Gatti	PCDS	Secretary of State for Finance and Budget and Transport
Andrea Belluzzi	We for the Republic	Secretary of State for Education and Culture, University and Scientific Research, Youth Policies
Roberto Ciavatta	RETE Movement	Secretary of State for Health and Social Security, Social Security and Social Affairs, Political Affairs, Equal Opportunities and Technological Innovation
Stefano Canti	PCDS	Secretary of State for the Territory and the Environment, Agriculture, Civil Protection and Relations with ASASLP
Teodoro Lonfernini	PCDS	Secretary of State for Labor, Economic Planning, Sport, Information and Relations with the AASS
Fabio Righi	Domani Motus Liberi	Secretary of State for Industry, Crafts and Commerce, Technological Research, Regulatory Simplification
Massimo Andrea Ugolini	PCDS	Secretary of State for Justice and the Family
Federico Pedini Amati	We for the Republic	State Secretary for Tourism, Post Office, Cooperation and Expo
