= Sammarinese Communist Refoundation =

Sammarinese Communist Refoundation Rifondazione Comunista Sammarinese
- Leader: Angelo Della Valle
- Founded: 1992
- Dissolved: 2012
- Split from: PPDS
- Merged into: SU
- Headquarters: Via Ca' dei Lunghi, 70/A – Borgo Maggiore
- Ideology: Communism
- Political position: Far-left
- European affiliation: Party of the European Left
- Italian counterpart: Communist Refoundation Party
- Colours: Red

Sammarinese Communist Refoundation (Italian: Rifondazione Comunista Sammarinese, RCS) was a communist political party in San Marino. It was a member of the European Left.

== History ==
It emerged in 1992 when the old Sammarinese Communist Party evolved into the Sammarinese Democratic Progressive Party and some members, on the example of the Italian Communist Refoundation Party, decided not to join the new party.

In the 2001 general election RCS won 3.4% of the vote, while in 2006 it gained 8.7% and 5 members of the Grand and General Council as part of the United Left, including the Left Party, a splinter group from the Party of Democrats. Since then it had been part of the 2006–2008 governing coalition along with the Party of Socialists and Democrats and Popular Alliance until tensions between its grouping, United Left, and the latter caused the coalition to disintegrate.

In the 2008 general election, United Left, the Sammarinese Communist Refoundation's political grouping, was part of the Reforms and Freedom electoral coalition which won 25 seats out of 60 in the Grand and General Council gaining 45.78% of the national vote. The Sammarinese Communist Refoundation gained a few seats and a small percentage of the national vote as part of United Left which itself gained 5 seats and 8.57% of the national vote.

During the legislature, the United Left was restructured from an alliance to a single party, absorbing RCS.

== See also ==
- Communist Refoundation Party
