= Left Party – Zona Franca =

Left Party – Zona Franca Partito della Sinistra – Zona Franca
- Leader: Francesca Michelotti
- Founded: 2005
- Dissolved: 2012
- Split from: Party of Democrats
- Merged into: United Left
- Ideology: Democratic socialism
- Political position: Left-wing
- Italian counterpart: Democratic Left
- Colours: Red

Left Party – Zona Franca (Italian: Partito della Sinistra – Zona Franca, PdS) was a democratic socialist political party in San Marino whose ideology and history are similar to those of the former party Democratic Left of Italy.

PdL emerged in 2005 when the Party of Democrats merged with the Sammarinese Socialist Party into the Party of Socialists and Democrats and some members decided not to join to the new party, forming instead an alliance with the Sammarinese Communist Refoundation, United Left.

In the 2006 general election United Left won 8.7% of the vote and 5 members of the Grand and General Council and since then, as part of United Left, Left Party – Zona Franca has been part of the 2006-2008 governing coalition along with the Party of Socialists and Democrats and Popular Alliance until tensions between its grouping, United Left, and the latter caused the coalition to disintegrate.

In the 2008 general election, United Left, the Left Party – Zona Francas political grouping, was part of the Reforms and Freedom electoral coalition which won 25 seats out of 60 in the Grand and General Council gaining 45.78% of the national vote. The Left Party – Zona Franca gained a few seats and a small percentage of the national vote as part of United Left which itself gained 5 seats and 8.57% of the national vote.

Encouraged by the good results of the alliance, the two party decided to merge, turning the United Left into a single party.
