= 2001 San Marino general election =

National election

- 10 June 2001
- All 60 seats in the Grand and General Council; 31 seats needed for a majority
- Turnout: 73.80% (▼1.48pp)
Party	Leader	Vote %	Seats	+/–
PDCS	Gabriele Gatti	41.45	25	0
PSS		24.18	15	+1
PD	Claudio Felici	20.81	12	New
APDSplR	Carlo Franciosi	8.23	5	−1
RCS	Ivan Foschi	3.39	2	0
ANS	Glauco Sansovini	1.93	1	New
This lists parties that won seats. See the complete results below.
Secretary for Foreign Affairs before	Secretary for Foreign Affairs after election
Gabriele Gatti; PDCS	Gabriele Gatti; PDCS

General elections were held in San Marino on 10 June 2001. The Sammarinese Christian Democratic Party remained the largest party, winning 25 of the 60 seats in the Grand and General Council, and continued their coalition with the Sammarinese Socialist Party.

== Electoral system ==
Voters had to be citizens of San Marino and at least 18 years old.

== Results ==
Party	Votes	%	Seats	+/–
Sammarinese Christian Democratic Party	9,031	41.45	25	0
Sammarinese Socialist Party	5,269	24.18	15	+1
Party of Democrats	4,535	20.81	12	–1
Popular Alliance of Sammarinese Democrats for the Republic	1,794	8.23	5	–1
Sammarinese Communist Refoundation	738	3.39	2	0
Sammarinese National Alliance	421	1.93	1	New
Total	21,788	100.00	60	0
Valid votes	21,788	96.20		
Invalid/blank votes	860	3.80		
Total votes	22,648	100.00		
Registered voters/turnout	30,688	73.80		
Source: Nohlen & Stöver, IPU
