= 2016 San Marino general election =

National election

- 20 November 2016 (first round); 4 December 2016 (second round)
- All 60 seats in the Grand and General Council; 31 seats needed for a majority
- Turnout: 59.66% (first round); 50.09% (second round)
Party	Leader	Vote %	Seats	+/–
Adesso.sm	Gian Carlo Capicchioni	31.43	35	+21
SMPT	Teodoro Lonferini	41.68	16	−22
DiM	Gloria Arcangeloni	23.18	9	+5
This lists parties that won seats. See the complete results below.
Results by castelli after the second round
Secretary for Foreign Affairs before	Secretary for Foreign Affairs after election
Pasquale Valentini; PDCS	Nicola Renzi; RF

General elections were held in San Marino on 20 November 2016 and 4 December 2016. The San Marino First alliance received a plurality of the popular vote, but fell short of a majority in the Grand and General Council, initially being allocated 25 seats. As no single bloc had won a majority of seats, a runoff was held on 4 December 2016 between the top two coalitions, San Marino First and Adesso.sm, to determine the winner of the majority prize. The second round saw Adesso.sm win with 58% of the vote, resulting in seats being reallocated and the winning alliance receiving 35 seats.

== Electoral system ==
The 60 members of the Grand and General Council were elected by party-list proportional representation, with seats allocated using the d'Hondt method. The electoral threshold is calculated by multiplying the number of parties running in the elections by 0.4, with a maximum possible threshold of 3.5%.

If no single bloc obtained an absolute majority, a runoff election would be held between the two most popular coalitions, of which the winner will obtain a majority jackpot – a seat bonus ensuring a majority.

== Results ==
Party or alliance		First round (initial seat allocation)			Second round (final seat allocation)			+/–
Party or alliance		Votes	%	Seats	Votes	%	Seats	+/–
San Marino First	Sammarinese Christian Democratic Party	4,752	24.46	16	6,889	42.08	10	–11
San Marino First	Socialist Party	1,496	7.70	5	6,889	42.08	3	–4
San Marino First	Party of Socialists and Democrats	1,392	7.17	4	6,889	42.08	3	–7
San Marino First	Sammarinese (NS–SsC)	414	2.13	0	6,889	42.08	0	–
San Marino First	Coalition votes	44	0.23	0	6,889	42.08	0	–
San Marino First	Total	8,098	41.68	25	6,889	42.08	16	–22
Adesso.sm	Democratic Socialist Left (SU–PR–LabDem)	2,352	12.11	8	9,482	57.92	14	+9
Adesso.sm	Future Republic (AP–UR)	1,865	9.60	6	9,482	57.92	11	+6
Adesso.sm	Civic 10	1,800	9.27	6	9,482	57.92	10	+6
Adesso.sm	Coalition votes	88	0.45	0	9,482	57.92	0	–
Adesso.sm	Total	6,105	31.43	20	9,482	57.92	35	+21
Democracy in Motion	RETE Movement	3,561	18.33	12			8	+4
Democracy in Motion	Democratic Movement – San Marino Together	872	4.49	3			1	New
Democracy in Motion	Coalition votes	70	0.36	0			0	–
Democracy in Motion	Total	4,503	23.18	15			9	+4
List of Free People		412	2.12	0			0	New
Sammarinese Democratic Revival		309	1.59	0			0	New
Total		19,427	100.00	60	16,371	100.00	60	0
Valid votes		19,427	95.81		16,371	96.16		
Invalid/blank votes		849	4.19		653	3.84		
Total votes		20,276	100.00		17,024	100.00		
Registered voters/turnout		33,985	59.66		33,985	50.09		
Source: Segreteria di Stato Libertas

=== Elected members ===
Name	Party	Alliance
Alessandro Bevitori	United Left	Adesso.sm
Alessandro Cardelli	Sammarinese Christian Democratic Party	San Marino First
Alessandro Mancini	Socialist Party	San Marino First
Andrea Zafferani	Civic 10	Adesso.sm
Angelo Della Valle	United Left	Adesso.sm
Augusto Michelotti	United Left	Adesso.sm
Carlo Franciosi	Popular Alliance	Adesso.sm
Dalibor Riccardi	Party of Socialists and Democrats	San Marino First
Davide Forcellini	RETE Movement	Democracy in Motion
Denise Bronzetti	Socialist Party	San Marino First
Elena Tonnini	RETE Movement	Democracy in Motion
Emmanuel Gasperoni	Popular Alliance	Adesso.sm
Enrico Carattoni	United Left	Adesso.sm
Eva Guidi	United Left	Adesso.sm
Federico Pedini Amati	Democratic Movement – San Marino Together	Democracy in Motion
Francesco Mussoni	Sammarinese Christian Democratic Party	San Marino First
Franco Santi	Civic 10	Adesso.sm
Gian Carlo Capicchioni	Party of Socialists and Democrats	San Marino First
Gian Carlo Venturini	Sammarinese Christian Democratic Party	San Marino First
Gian Matteo Zeppa	RETE Movement	Democracy in Motion
Giovanna Cecchetti	Socialist Party	San Marino First
Giuseppe Maria Morganti	Progressives and Reformists	Adesso.sm
Gloria Arcangeloni	RETE Movement	Democracy in Motion
Grazia Zafferani	RETE Movement	Democracy in Motion
Guerrino Zanotti	Progressives and Reformists	Adesso.sm
Iader Tosi	Civic 10	Adesso.sm
Iro Belluzzi	Party of Socialists and Democrats	San Marino First
Lorenzo Lonfernini	Union for the Republic	Adesso.sm
Luca Boschi	Civic 10	Adesso.sm
Luca Santolini	Civic 10	Adesso.sm
Marco Gatti	Sammarinese Christian Democratic Party	San Marino First
Marco Podeschi	Union for the Republic	Adesso.sm
Margherita Amici	Popular Alliance	Adesso.sm
Marianna Bucci	RETE Movement	Democracy in Motion
Mariella Mularoni	Sammarinese Christian Democratic Party	San Marino First
Marina Lazzarini	Progressives and Reformists	Adesso.sm
Massimo Andrea Ugolini	Sammarinese Christian Democratic Party	San Marino First
Matteo Ciacci	Civic 10	Adesso.sm
Matteo Fiorini	Popular Alliance	Adesso.sm
Mattia Guidi	Civic 10	Adesso.sm
Michele Muratori	Progressives and Reformists	Adesso.sm
Mimma Zavoli	Civic 10	Adesso.sm
Mirco Tomassoni	Progressives and Reformists	Adesso.sm
Nicola Renzi	Popular Alliance	Adesso.sm
Nicola Selva	Union for the Republic	Adesso.sm
Oscar Mina	Sammarinese Christian Democratic Party	San Marino First
Pasquale Valentini	Sammarinese Christian Democratic Party	San Marino First
Roberto Ciavatta	RETE Movement	Democracy in Motion
Roberto Giorgetti	Popular Alliance	Adesso.sm
Roberto Joseph Carlini	United Left	Adesso.sm
Roger Zavoli	Union for the Republic	Adesso.sm
Sandra Giardi	RETE Movement	Democracy in Motion
Silvano Andreani	Civic 10	Adesso.sm
Simone Celli	Democratic Laboratory	Adesso.sm
Stefano Canti	Sammarinese Christian Democratic Party	San Marino First
Stefano Palmieri	Popular Alliance	Adesso.sm
Teodoro Lonfernini	Sammarinese Christian Democratic Party	San Marino First
Tony Margiotta	United Left	Adesso.sm
Valentina Bollini	Civic 10	Adesso.sm
Vanessa D’ambrosio	Progressives and Reformists	Adesso.sm
