= New Socialist Party (San Marino) =

Defunct political party in San Marino

New Socialist Party Nuovo Partito Socialista
- Leader: Augusto Casali
- Founded: 18 November 2005
- Dissolved: 30 May 2012
- Split from: Party of Socialists and Democrats
- Merged into: Socialist Party
- Headquarters: Via dei Boschetti, 57 - Borgo Maggiore
- Ideology: Social liberalism Social democracy Third Way
- Italian counterpart: New Italian Socialist Party
- Colours: Blue, White, Red

Website
- www.nuovopartitosocialista.sm

The New Socialist Party (Italian: Nuovo Partito Socialista, NPS) was a social-democratic political party in San Marino.

It was formed in 2005 as a split by those among the members of the Sammarinese Socialist Party who did not accept the merger with the post-communist Party of Democrats into the Party of Socialists and Democrats. Its Italian counterpart was the New Italian Socialist Party, also affiliated with the centre-right.

In the 2006 general election NPS won 5.4% of the votes cast and took three seats and stood in opposition to the 2006-2008 governing coalition formed by the Party of Socialists and Democrats, Popular Alliance and United Left.

In the 2008 general election the party participated within the Freedom List that won 1,317 votes (6.28%) and got 4 seats. The Freedom List is part of the centre-right Pact for San Marino coalition. This electoral coalition won 35 seats out of 60 in the Grand and General Council in the Sammarinese parliamentary election, 2008 gaining 54.22% of the national vote and a governmental majority of 5. The alliance has formed the new government of San Marino. Thus, the New Socialist Party (as part of the Pact for San Marino coalition and of the Freedom List), became part of the official new government.

On 30 May 2012 the party merged with the Sammarinese Reformist Socialist Party to form the modern-day Socialist Party.

== See also ==
- New Italian Socialist Party
