= Fabio Berardi =

Sammarinese politician (born 1959)

Captain Regent of San Marino
- In office 1 October 2016 – 1 April 2017; Served with Marino Riccardi
- Preceded by: Massimo Andrea Ugolini; Gian Nicola Berti
- Succeeded by: Mimma Zavoli; Vanessa D'Ambrosio
- In office 1 April 2001 – 1 October 2001; Served with Luigi Lonfernini
- Preceded by: Gianfranco Terenzi; Enzo Colombini
- Succeeded by: Alberto Cecchetti; Gino Giovagnoli

Secretary for Foreign and Political Affairs
- In office 15 December 2003 – 27 July 2006
- Preceded by: Fiorenzo Stolfi
- Succeeded by: Fiorenzo Stolfi

Additional positions
- 2008-2012: Secretary for Tourism, Sport, Economic Planning and Relations with the AASS
- 2006-2007: Secretary for Health, Social Security, Social Security and Equal Opportunities
- 2001-2003: Secretary for Planning, Environment and Agriculture
- 1998-2016: Member of the Grand and General Council
- 1995-1998: Member of the Borgo Maggiore Castle Council

Personal details
- Born: 26 May 1959 (age 67) Borgo Maggiore, San Marino
- Party: Sammarinese Christian Democratic Party (since 2012)
- Other political affiliations: Arengo and Freedom (2008–2012); Party of Socialists and Democrats (2005–2008); Sammarinese Socialist Party (2001–2005)
- Children: 2

Fabio Berardi (born 26 May 1959) is a Sammarinese lawyer and politician who served as a Captain Regent from April to October 2001 and from October 2016 to April 2017.

From October 2001 until December 2003, he served as Secretary of State for Planning, Environment and Agriculture. From January 2004 until July 2006 he served as the minister of foreign and political affairs of San Marino until he was succeeded on 27 July by Fiorenzo Stolfi. From July 2006, he was minister of public health until September 2008. Since December 2008, he has served as Secretary of State for Tourism, Sports, Economic Planning and Relations.

Berardi was a member of the Sammarinese Socialist Party and its successor the Party of Socialists and Democrats until September 2008 when he and another member, Nadia Ottaviani, splintered off to form a new party, Arengo and Freedom, which he led until the dissolution of the party in 2012 before the 2012 general election. In the same year, he joined the Christian Democratic Party and was re-elected to the legislature.
