= Sammarineses for Freedom =

Sammarineses for Freedom Sammarinesi per la Libertà
- Leader: Monica Bollini
- Founded: 2002
- Dissolved: 2012
- Split from: Sammarinese Socialist Party
- Headquarters: Via Cà dei Lunghi 16 - Cailungo
- Ideology: Liberalism; Social liberalism Christian liberalism Third way Reformism
- Political position: Centre
- National affiliation: Reforms and Freedom (2008–2011)
- Colours: Blue, white

Sammarineses for Freedom (Italian: Sammarinesi per la Libertà, SpL) was, according to its statutes, a social liberal and Christian liberal political party in San Marino.

The party was founded in 2002 by splinters of the Sammarinese Socialist Party. In the 2006 general election SpL won 1.8% of the vote and one out of 60 seats. In the 2008 general election the party ran in list with the larger Party of Socialists and Democrats, within the Reforms and Freedom coalition which won 25 seats out of 60 in the Grand and General Council gaining 45.78% of the national vote. The Sammarinese for Freedom party itself gained a few seats.

The party collapsed in 2012, not being able to participate in the 2012 general election.
