= 2006 San Marino general election =

National election

- 4 June 2006
- All 60 seats in the Grand and General Council; 31 seats needed for a majority
- Turnout: 71.84% (▼1.96pp)
Party	Leader	Vote %	Seats	+/–
PDCS	Pier Marino Menicucci	32.92	21	−4
PSD	Fiorenzo Stolfi	31.83	20	New
AP	Carlo Franciosi	12.05	7	+2
SU	Francesca Michelotti	8.67	5	+3
NPS	Augusto Casali	5.42	3	New
NS	Marco Arzilli	2.53	1	New
PS	Romeo Morri	2.43	1	New
ANS	Glauco Sansovini	2.32	1	0
SpL	Monica Bollini	1.84	1	New
This lists parties that won seats. See the complete results below.
Results by castelli
Secretary for Foreign Affairs before	Secretary for Foreign Affairs after election
Fabio Berardi; PSD	Fiorenzo Stolfi; PSD

General elections were held in San Marino on 4 June 2006. The Sammarinese Christian Democratic Party remained the largest party, winning 21 of the 60 seats in the Grand and General Council. Following the elections the Party of Socialists and Democrats formed a coalition with the Popular Alliance and United Left.

== Electoral system ==
Voters had to be citizens of San Marino and at least 18 years old.

== Results ==
Party	Votes	%	Seats	+/–
Sammarinese Christian Democratic Party	7,257	32.92	21	–4
Party of Socialists and Democrats	7,017	31.83	20	+5
Popular Alliance	2,657	12.05	7	+2
United Left	1,911	8.67	5	+3
New Socialist Party	1,194	5.42	3	New
We Sammarineses	558	2.53	1	New
Sammarinese Populars	535	2.43	1	New
Sammarinese National Alliance	512	2.32	1	0
Sammarineses for Freedom	405	1.84	1	New
Total	22,046	100.00	60	0
Valid votes	22,046	96.63		
Invalid/blank votes	769	3.37		
Total votes	22,815	100.00		
Registered voters/turnout	31,759	71.84		
Source: Nohlen & Stöver, IPU
