= Silvia Cecchetti =

Sammarinese politician (born 1972)

Silvia Cecchetti (born 23 March 1972) is a Sammarinese politician, member of the Council of Twelves since 2024 and the Grand and General Council since 2024. She is also president of the Party of Socialists and Democrats since 2024 and served as vicepresident of the Central Bank of San Marino between 2017 and 2018.

== Career ==
Cecchetti was born on 23 March 1972. She is lawyer and notary by profession.

In September 2012, Cecchetti and her father Alberto left Sammarinese Reformist Socialist Party and subsequently joined the Party of Socialists and Democrats.

She was appointed member of the Executive Council of the Central Bank of San Marino in 2013. In May 2017 Cecchetti was appointed its vicepresident until her resignation in July 2018. She was succeeded as member of the Executive Council by Giacomo Volpinari in August 2018.

She was Party of Socialists and Democrats (PSD) candidate for San Marino in the 2024 parliamentary election and got elected member of the Grand and General Council. On 22 July 2024 Cecchetti was appointed by the Grand and General Council as member of the Council of Twelve.

In the PSD congress that was held between 26 and 27 October 2024, Cecchetti was elected president of the PSD.
