= Gabriele Gatti =

Sammarinese politician (born 1953)

Gabriele Gatti OMM OMRI

Captain Regent of San Marino
- In office 1 October 2011 – 1 April 2012 Serving with Matteo Fiorini
- Preceded by: Maria Luisa Berti; Filippo Tamagnini
- Succeeded by: Italo Righi; Maurizio Rattini

Secretary for Finance and Budget
- In office 3 December 2008 – 30 April 2010
- Preceded by: Stefano Macina
- Succeeded by: Pasquale Valentini

Secretary for Foreign and Political Affairs
- In office 26 July 1986 – 21 May 2002
- Preceded by: Giordano Bruno Reffi
- Succeeded by: Romeo Morri

Additional positions
- 2002: President of the Central Council of the Sammarinese Christian Democratic Party
- 1985–1987: Political Secretary of the Sammarinese Christian Democratic Party
- 1979–1985: Deputy Political Secretary of the Sammarinese Christian Democratic Party
- 1978–2012: Member of the Grand and General Council

Personal details
- Born: 27 March 1953 (age 73) City of San Marino, San Marino
- Party: Sammarinese Christian Democratic Party
- Education: University of Urbino

Gabriele Gatti (born 27 March 1953) is a Sammarinese politician who served as Captain Regent from October 2011 to April 2012, alongside Matteo Fiorini. A member of the Sammarinese Christian Democratic Party, he previously served as Secretary of State for Foreign and Political Affairs from 1986 to 2002 and as Secretary of State for Finance from 2008 to 2010.

Gabriele Gatti, on 28 November 2011, denied all accusations of being the political reference, of the San Marino Connection, falling in the Staffa Operation.

On 18 September 2012, Gabriele Gatti was mentioned several times in the "Final Report of the Council Commission for the phenomenon of infiltration of organized crime with powers of investigation" prepared by the Sammarinese Anti-Mafia Commission.

== Honours ==
Order pro merito Melitensi (it: Cavaliere di Gran Croce dell'Ordine pro merito Melitensi)

Order of Merit of the Italian Republic (it: Cavaliere di Gran Croce dell'Ordine al Merito della Repubblica Italiana)
