= Carlo Franciosi =

Sammarinese doctor and politician (1935–2021)

Carlo Franciosi (1 April 1935 – 27 December 2021) was Captain Regent of San Marino from 1 April 1987 to 1 October 1987.

A doctor by profession, he was committed to politics as well. Between 1978 and 1993, he was a member of the Grand and General Council. At first he was a member of the Sammarinese Christian Democratic Party, later on the Popular Alliance and finally the Future Republic.
