= Centre Democrats (San Marino) =

Movement of Centre Democrats Movimento dei Democratici di Centro
- Leader: Orazio Mazza
- Founded: 27 March 2007
- Dissolved: 4 March 2011
- Split from: Sammarinese Christian Democratic Party
- Merged into: UpR
- Headquarters: Via Cà Franceschino, 2 - Borgo Maggiore
- Ideology: Christian left Social democracy
- Political position: Centre to centre-left
- Italian counterpart: The Daisy
- Colours: Light blue, White

The Movement of Centre Democrats (Italian: Movimento dei Democratici di Centro, DdC) was a social Christian political party in San Marino. Its Italian counterpart was The Daisy.

It emerged in 2007 as a left-wing split from the Sammarinese Christian Democratic Party. For the 2008 general election, the first elections the Centre Democrats have taken part in, the party was part of the Reforms and Freedom coalition, centred on the Party of Socialists and Democrats which won 25 seats out of 60 in the Grand and General Council gaining 45.78% of the national vote. The Centre Democrats itself gained 2 seats out of the 25 the coalition and 4.94% of the national vote.

On 4 March 2011, the party merged with Euro-Populars for San Marino to form the Union for the Republic.
