= Pact for San Marino =

Pact for San Marino Patto per San Marino
- Leader: Alliance of four parties
- Founded: 2008
- Dissolved: 2011
- Ideology: Christian democracy Liberal conservatism Liberalism
- Political position: Centre-right
- Colours: Blue

Pact for San Marino (Italian: Patto per San Marino) was a centrist coalition of parties for the 2008 general election in San Marino.

It was composed of four lists for a total of eight parties:

Party	Ideology	Electoral list
PDCS–EPS	Christian democracy	PDCS–EPS–AF
Arengo and Freedom	Liberalism	PDCS–EPS–AF
Popular Alliance	Big tent	Popular Alliance
New Socialist Party	Social liberalism	Freedom List
We Sammarinese	Liberal conservatism	Freedom List
Sammarinese People	Conservatism	Sammarinese; Moderates
Sammarinese National Alliance	National conservatism	Sammarinese; Moderates

== Election results and summary ==
The electoral coalition won 35 seats out of 60 in the Grand and General Council in the Sammarinese parliamentary election, 2008 gaining 54.22% of the national vote and an automatic governmental majority of 5 and became the new government of San Marino with Ernesto Benedettini of the Sammarinese Christian Democratic Party and Assunta Meloni of Popular Alliance becoming Captains Regent of San Marino, defeating the left-wing Reforms and Freedom coalition which gained 25 seats in the Grand and General council and failed to get a governing majority. Pact for San Marino replaced the previous left-wing governing coalition of Party of Socialists and Democrats, United Left and Popular Alliance.

The alliance collapsed in 2011, with San Marino returning to the old governing alliance between Christian Democrats, Socialists and Liberals.
