= Euro-Populars for San Marino =

Euro-Populars for San Marino Europopolari per San Marino
- Founded: 7 September 2007
- Dissolved: 4 March 2011
- Split from: PDCS
- Merged into: UpR
- Ideology: Christian democracy Popularism; Europeanism
- Political position: Centre
- Colours: Light blue White

The Euro-Populars for San Marino (Italian: Europopolari per San Marino, EPS) was a Christian democratic political party in San Marino.

It emerged in September 2007 as a split from the Sammarinese Christian Democratic Party (PDCS). It held 5 seats out of 60 in the Grand and General Council prior to the elections from its time as part of the PDCS. For the 2008 general election the first elections the Euro-Populars for San Marino competed in, the party was part of the Pact for San Marino coalition and had its candidates in the list of the PDCS. The electoral coalition won 35 seats out of 60 in the Grand and General Council in the Sammarinese parliamentary election, 2008 gaining 54.22% of the national vote and a governmental majority of 5, becoming the new government of San Marino. The Euro-Populars for San Marino itself gained a few seats and a small percentage of the national vote as part of the coalition.

On 4 March 2011, the party merged with the Centre Democrats (DdC) to form the Union for the Republic.
