= Agreement for the Country =

Agreement for the Country Intesa per il Paese
- Founded: 2012
- Political position: Big tent
- Grand Councillors: 12 / 60

Agreement for the Country (Italian: Intesa per il Paese) is a centrist political and electoral alliance in San Marino, formed to contest the 2012 general election. It is composed of:

- Socialist Party (PS, social democratic),
- Union for the Republic (UPR, centrist and Christian leftist),
- Sammarinese Moderates (conservative).
