= Arengo and Freedom =

Political party in San Marino

Arengo and Freedom Arengo e Libertà
- Founded: September 2008
- Dissolved: September 2012
- Split from: Party of Socialists and Democrats
- Ideology: Liberalism; Social liberalism
- Political position: Centre to centre-right
- Colours: Azure
- Italian counterpart: Circles of Freedom, Forza Italia (partly)

Arengo and Freedom (Italian: Arengo e Libertà, AL) was a liberal and social liberal political party in San Marino.

It was founded in September 2008 by two splinters from the Party of Socialists and Democrats, Fabio Berardi and Nadia Ottaviani, both members of the Grand and General Council, who considered the party to be too leftist. The group is linked to the Italian Clubs of Freedom. For the 2008 general election, the sole elections Arengo and Freedom have competed in, the party was part of the Pact for San Marino coalition and had its candidates in the list of the Sammarinese Christian Democratic Party (PDCS). The electoral coalition won 35 seats out of 60 in the Grand and General Council in the 2008 general election, gaining 54.22% of the national vote and a governmental majority of 5.

After the Sammarinese political crisis of 2011, and looking to the elections of 2012, the party collapsed, their members joining many different parties.
