= Libera San Marino =

Free San Marino Libera San Marino
- Abbreviation: Libera
- President: Giuseppe Maria Morganti
- Political Secretary: Giulia Muratori
- Deputy Political Secretary: Luca Boschi
- Founded: 14 October 2019 (as a coalition); 14 November 2020 (as a party)
- Merger of: Civic 10; SSD; ReS
- Preceded by: Adesso.sm
- Headquarters: Via del Serrone 62, 47890 San Marino
- Ideology: Democratic socialism Pro-Europeanism
- Political position: Centre-left
- National affiliation: Libera-PS/PSD
- European affiliation: Socialists, Democrats and Greens
- Italian counterpart: Greens and Left Alliance; Green Europe
- Colours: Blue-green; Red
- Grand and General Council: 10 / 60

Website
- libera.sm

The Libera San Marino (Libera; English: Free San Marino) is a political party in San Marino, founded on 14 November 2020.

== History ==
Originating as a coalition of parties on 14 October 2019, Libera won third place in the 2019 San Marino general election and became the largest parliamentary opposition force in the Grand and General Council. The component member parties of the coalition – namely the Democratic Socialist Left, Civic 10, Socialist Ideals Movement and Reforms and Development – merged into a unitary party on 14 November 2020.

In April 2024 the party formed an alliance with the Party of Socialists and Democrats and Socialist Party (PS) for the 2024 general election, within which PS and Libera will share an electoral list.

== Electoral history ==
Grand and General Council
| Election | Leader | Votes | % | Seats | +/– | Government |
|---|---|---|---|---|---|---|
| 2019 | Luca Boschi | 2,964 | 16.49 (#3) | 10 / 60 | | Opposition |
| 2024 | Matteo Ciacci | In a joint list with PS | 15.75 (#2) | 10 / 60 | steady | Coalition |
