= 1964 San Marino general election =

National election

- 13 September 1964
- All 60 seats in the Grand and General Council; 31 seats needed for a majority
- Turnout: 83.99% (▼1.76pp)
| Party | Vote % | Seats | +/– |
|---|---|---|---|
| PDCS | 46.83 | 29 | +2 |
| PCS | 24.11 | 14 | −2 |
| PSDIS | 16.17 | 10 | +1 |
| PSS | 10.68 | 6 | −2 |
| MLS | 2.22 | 1 | New |
This lists parties that won seats. See the complete results below.
| Secretary for Foreign Affairs before | Secretary for Foreign Affairs after election |
|---|---|
| Federico Bigi; PDCS | Federico Bigi; PDCS |

General elections were held in San Marino on 13 September 1964. The Sammarinese Christian Democratic Party remained the largest party, winning 29 of the 60 seats in the Grand and General Council, and continued their coalition with the Independent Democratic Socialist Party.

== Electoral system ==
Voters had to be citizens of San Marino and at least 24 years old. This was the first election in San Marino with women's suffrage.

== Results ==
| Party | Votes | % | Seats | +/– |
|---|---|---|---|---|
| Sammarinese Christian Democratic Party | 5,939 | 46.83 | 29 | +2 |
| Sammarinese Communist Party | 3,058 | 24.11 | 14 | –2 |
| Sammarinese Independent Democratic Socialist Party | 2,051 | 16.17 | 10 | +1 |
| Sammarinese Socialist Party | 1,354 | 10.68 | 6 | –2 |
| Movement for Constitutional Freedoms | 281 | 2.22 | 1 | New |
| Total | 12,683 | 100.00 | 60 | 0 |
| Valid votes | 12,683 | 98.10 | | |
| Invalid/blank votes | 245 | 1.90 | | |
| Total votes | 12,928 | 100.00 | | |
| Registered voters/turnout | 15,392 | 83.99 | | |
Source: Nohlen & Stöver
