= 2008 San Marino general election =

National election

- 9 November 2008
- All 60 seats in the Grand and General Council; 31 seats needed for a majority
- Turnout: 68.48% (▼3.36pp)
Party	Leader	Vote %	Seats	+/–
Pact for San Marino	Antonella Mularoni	54.22	35	+1
Reforms and Freedom	Fiorenzo Stolfi	45.78	25	−1
This lists parties that won seats. See the complete results below.
Results by castelli
Secretary for Foreign Affairs before	Secretary for Foreign Affairs after election
Fiorenzo Stolfi; PSD–Reforms and Freedom	Antonella Mularoni; AP–Pact for San Marino

Snap general elections were held in San Marino on 9 November 2008. They were called after the collapse of the centre-left government which had won the previous 2006 elections.

In June 2008, due to disagreements within the coalition partners, the Party of Socialists and Democrats (PSD), Popular Alliance (AP) and United Left (SU), AP left the coalition and the cabinet fell down. The PSD tried to form a narrow-majority coalition with SU, Sammarineses for Freedom (SpL) and Centre Democrats (DdC), but two dissenting members of PSD left their party and formed Arengo and Freedom (AL), leaving the proposed coalition without a majority in Parliament.

Due to the new electoral law passed earlier in 2008 which introduced a number of changes (an electoral threshold of 3.5% and a majority premium for the winning coalition, on the example of the electoral system for the Italian cities), the election was contested by two major coalitions: Pact for San Marino (centre-right) and Reforms and Freedom (centre-left).

== Electoral system ==
Voters had to be citizens of San Marino and at least 18 years old.

== Coalitions and parties ==
Due to the new electoral law, Sammarinese political parties are organized in two major coalitions:

- Pact for San Marino (Patto per San Marino)
- Reforms and Freedom (Riforme e Libertà)

=== Pact for San Marino ===
Party	Ideology	Electoral list
PDCS–EPS	Christian democracy	PDCS–EPS–AeL
Arengo and Freedom	Liberalism	PDCS–EPS–AeL
Popular Alliance	Big tent	Popular Alliance
New Socialist Party	Social liberalism	Freedom List
We Sammarineses	Liberal conservatism	Freedom List
Sammarinese People	Conservatism	Sammarinese; Moderates
Sammarinese National Alliance	National conservatism	Sammarinese; Moderates

=== Reforms and Freedom ===
Party	Ideology	Electoral list
Party of Socialists and Democrats	Social democracy	Party of Socialists and Democrats
Sammarineses for Freedom	Social liberalism	Party of Socialists and Democrats
Communist Refoundation	Communism	United Left
Left Party – Zona Franca	Democratic socialism	United Left
Centre Democrats	Christian left	Democrats

== Results ==
Party or alliance		Votes	%	Seats	+/–
Pact for San Marino	PDCS–EPS–AeL	6,692	31.91	22	+1
Pact for San Marino	Popular Alliance	2,415	11.52	7	0
Pact for San Marino	Freedom List	1,317	6.28	4	0
Pact for San Marino	Sammarinese Union of Moderates	874	4.17	2	0
Pact for San Marino	Coalition votes	73	0.35	–	–
Pact for San Marino	Total	11,371	54.22	35	+1
Reforms and Freedom	Party of Socialists and Democrats	6,702	31.96	18	–3
Reforms and Freedom	United Left	1,797	8.57	5	0
Reforms and Freedom	Centre Democrats	1,037	4.94	2	New
Reforms and Freedom	Coalition votes	65	0.31	–	–
Reforms and Freedom	Total	9,601	45.78	25	–1
Total		20,972	100.00	60	0
Valid votes		20,972	96.18		
Invalid/blank votes		834	3.82		
Total votes		21,806	100.00		
Registered voters/turnout		31,845	68.48		
Source: Secretary of State for Internal Affairs
