= Freedom List (San Marino) =

Freedom List Lista della Libertà
- Founded: 2008
- Dissolved: 2011
- Ideology: Social democracy Third Way; Liberalism
- Political position: Centre to centre-left
- Colours: Red, Blue

Freedom List (Italian: Lista della Libertà, LdL) was an electoral alliance for the 2008 general election in San Marino, composed of:

- New Socialist Party (social-democratic)
- We Sammarinese (centrist)

In the 2008 general election Freedom List ran within the centrist Pact for San Marino coalition. The electoral coalition won 35 seats out of 60 in the Grand and General Council in the Sammarinese parliamentary election, 2008 gaining 54.22% of the national vote and a governmental majority of 5 and has become the new government of San Marino and as a result the Freedom List which itself gained 4 out of the 35 seats the coalition gained and 6.28% of the national vote, as part of the coalition, became part of the government.

The association was disbanded in 2011, following the collapse of the government coalition.
