= Reforms and Freedom =

Reforms and Freedom Riforme e Libertà
- Founded: 2008
- Dissolved: 2011
- Ideology: Social liberalism Social democracy Christian left Democratic socialism Eurocommunism
- Political position: Centre-left to Left-wing; Factions: Far-left
- Colours: Red

Reforms and Freedom (Italian: Riforme e Libertà) was a left-wing coalition of parties for the 2008 general election in San Marino.

| Party | Ideology | Electoral list |
|---|---|---|
| Party of Socialists and Democrats | Social democracy | Centre-left |
| Sammarinese for Freedom | Social liberalism | Centre-left |
| Sammarinese Communist Refoundation | Communism | United Left |
| Left Party – Zona Franca | Democratic socialism | United Left |
| Centre Democrats | Christian left | Democrats |

== Election results and summary ==
The electoral coalition won 25 seats out of 60 in the Grand and General Council in the Sammarinese parliamentary election, 2008 gaining 45.78% of the national vote but failed to gain a governmental majority. As a result, the coalition became the opposition to the new government of the right-wing coalition of Pact for San Marino.

After the political crisis of 2011, the alliance was disbanded, the Party of Socialists and Democrats joining their ancient opponents into a government of national unity.
