= Sammarinese Democratic Party =

Sammarinese Democratic Party Partito Democratico Sammarinese
- Abbreviation: PDS
- Leader: Alessandro Corbelli
- Founded: 2008
- Ideology: Reformism
- Political position: Centre
- Colours: Light blue
- Grand Councillors: 0 / 60

The Sammarinese Democratic Party (Italian: Partito Democratico Sammarinese) is a Sammarinese political party. Its president was Alessandro Corbelli as of 2008.
