= Democracy and Freedom (San Marino) =

Democracy and Freedom Democrazia e Libertà
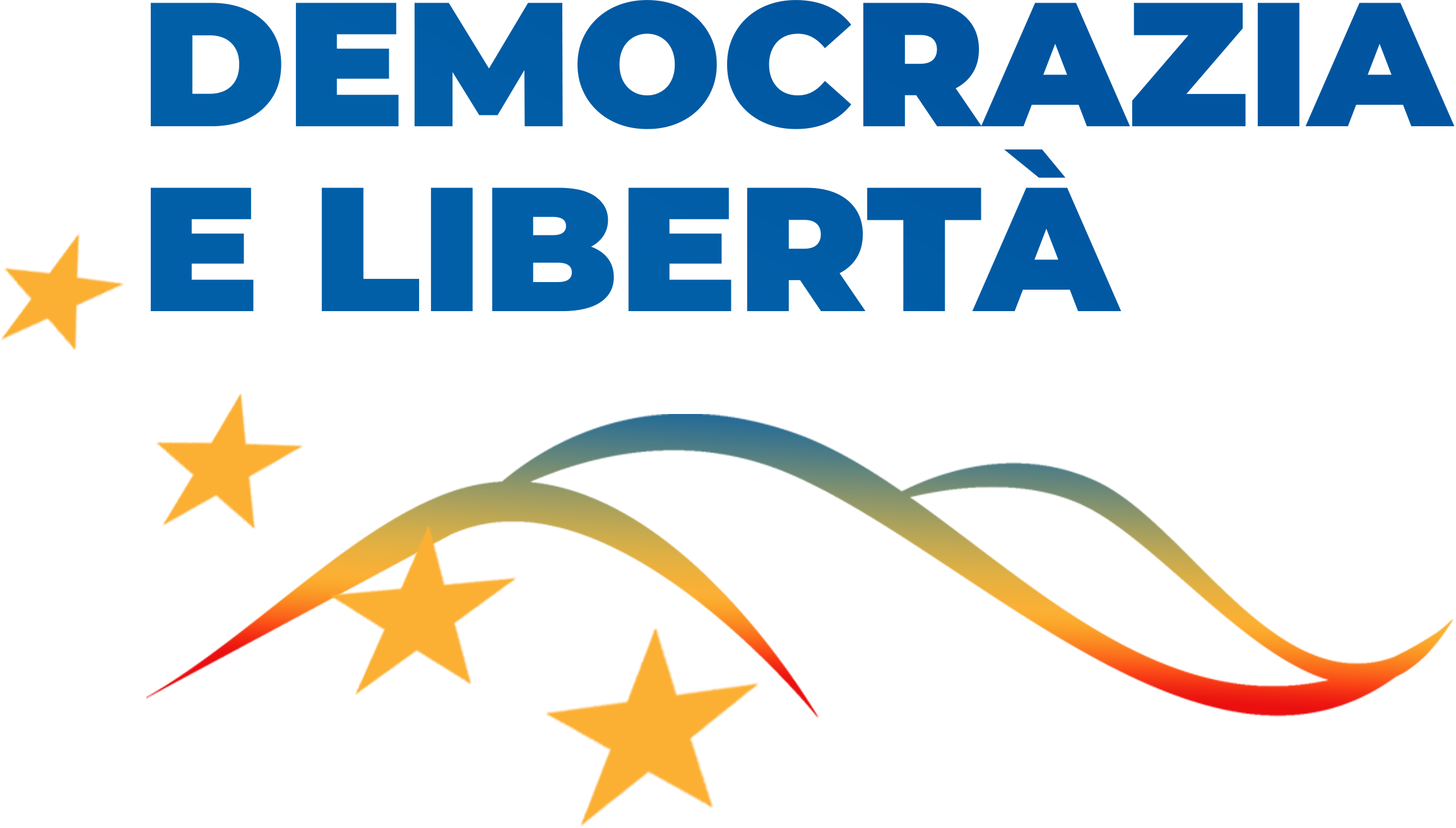
- Leader: Gian Carlo Venturini
- Founded: 18 April 2024; 13 months ago
- Ideology: Christian Democracy; Conservatism; Liberalism; Factions: Democratic socialism
- Political position: Centre
- Grand and General Council: 26 / 60

Website
- www.del.sm

Democracy and Freedom (Italian: Democrazia e Libertà, DeL) is a political alliance in San Marino formed to contest the 2024 San Marino general election.

The coalition was launched on 18 April 2024, by the Sammarinese Christian Democratic Party and Reformist Alliance, the latter composed of We Sammarinese, the Socialist Ideals Movement and Elego. The name and logo of the alliance was presented on 20 April.
