= Elena Tonnini =

Sammarinese politician

Secretary of State for Internal Affairs, Civil Service, Institutional Affairs and Relations with the Municipalities
- Incumbent
- Assumed office 7 January 2020

Personal details
- Born: 2 February 1979 (age 47) San Marino
- Party: RETE Movement

Elena Tonnini (born 2 January 1979) is a politician from the RETE Movement of San Marino who has served as the Secretary of State for Internal Affairs, Civil Service, Institutional Affairs and Relations with the Municipalities since January 2020.
