= San Marino Common Good =

San Marino Common Good San Marino Bene Comune
- Founded: 2012
- Dissolved: 2016
- Ideology: Christian democracy Liberalism; Social democracy Pro-Europeanism; Factions: Democratic socialism
- Political position: Big tent
- Grand Councillors: 35 / 60

San Marino Common Good (Italian: San Marino Bene Comune) is a centrist political and electoral alliance in San Marino, formed to contest the 2012 general election. It comprises the following political parties:

- Sammarinese Christian Democratic Party (PDCS, Christian democratic), including also:
  - We Sammarineses (NS, centrist),
- Party of Socialists and Democrats (PSD, social-democratic),
- Popular Alliance (AP, liberal-centrist).
