= RETE Movement =

RETE Civic Movement Movimento Civico RETE
- Abbreviation: RETE
- President: Andrea Giani
- Vice President: Andrea Ciavatta
- Political Secretary: Giovanni Maria Zonzini
- Deputy Political Secretary: Gabriele Vitali
- Founded: 20 March 2012
- Headquarters: Via Trasmundo da Fano, 4. Murata – Domagnano
- Ideology: Social democracy; Progressivism; Environmentalism
- Political position: Left-wing
- European affiliation: Unified European Left
- Italian counterpart: Five Star Movement
- Slogan: "Once upon a turning point" ("C'era una svolta")
- Grand and General Council: 3 / 60

Website
- www.movimentorete.org

The RETE Movement (Italian: Movimento Civico Rinnovamento – Equità – Trasparenza – Ecosostenibilità, lit. 'Renewal – Equity – Transparency – Eco-sustainability Civic Movement') is a political party in San Marino. Founded in 2012, it has won seats in every election it has participated in, and served in the coalition government formed in the aftermath of the 2019 election.

== History ==
The party was formed by several activist groups involved in environmentalism, civic rights and the arts. It contested the 2012 general election, receiving 6.3% of the vote and winning four seats. Prior to the 2016 general election, the party joined the Democracy in Motion alliance, going on to win eight of the alliance's nine seats. The party was part of the Tomorrow in Motion alliance for the 2019 election, in which it won eleven seats. It subsequently formed a coalition government with the Sammarinese Christian Democratic Party and the We for the Republic electoral alliance.

In March 2022, Paolo Rondelli of the RETE Movement was appointed as one of the two Captains Regents of San Marino, becoming the first openly LGBTQ+ (specifically openly gay) head of state in the world.

On 14 October 2024, the RETE Movement elected a new leadership consisting of Giovanni Maria Zonzini as secretary, Gabriele Vitali as vice-secretary and Andrea Giani as president. It also announced that it would change its name sometime in the future, as it was no longer a civic movement and had been acting as a political party for most of its history.

== Ideology ==
The RETE Movement describes itself as a social democratic and progressive party, as well as being on the left of the political spectrum. It also supports LGBTQ rights.

== Election results ==
Grand and General Council
Election	Leader	Votes	%	Seats	+/–	Status
2012	Gloria Arcangeloni	1,244	6.29 (#8)	4 / 60	—N/a	Opposition
2016	Gloria Arcangeloni	3,561	16.49 (#2)	8 / 60	▲4	Opposition
2019	Gloria Arcangeloni	3,276	18.23 (#2)	11 / 60	▲3	Coalition
2024	Emanuele Santi	922	5.07 (#7)	3 / 60	▼8	Opposition
