= Francesca Michelotti =

Sammarinese politician

Francesca Michelotti (born 16 February 1952) is a Sammarinese politician who has served in various positions in the Congress of State (the Government).

As of January 2015, she was the head of the parliamentary group of the United Left. Between 2000 and 2001 was Minister of Internal Affairs and Justice.
