= We Sammarineses =

Political party in San Marino

We Sammarineses Noi Sammarinesi
- Leader: Maria Luisa Berti
- Founded: 26 March 2006
- Headquarters: Via XXVIII Luglio 160 - Borgo Maggiore
- Ideology: Liberalism
- Political position: Centre to centre-right
- National affiliation: We for the Republic (2019–2024); Reformist Alliance (since 2024)
- Colours: Blue and white

Website
- www.noisammarinesi.com

We Sammarineses (Italian: Noi Sammarinesi, NS) is a conservative-liberal political party in San Marino.

In the 2006 general election NS won 2.5% and 1 out of 60 seats and stood in opposition to the 2006-2008 governing coalition of the Party of Socialists and Democrats, Popular Alliance and United Left.

In the 2008 general election the party participated within the Freedom List that won 1,317 votes (6.28%) and got 4 seats. At time, the Freedom List was part of the centre-right Pact for San Marino coalition. The electoral coalition won 35 seats out of 60 in the Grand and General Council in the 2008 Sammarinese parliamentary election gaining 54.22% of the national vote and a governmental majority of 5, becoming the new government of San Marino. As a result, Noi Sammarinesi which itself gained a few seats and a small percentage of the national vote as part of the coalition and as part of the Freedom List.

In 2011 the Pact for San Marino government collapsed, causing the disbandment of its component lists. We Sammarinese, now a fully free party, decided to accept a federative pact with the Sammarinese Christian Democratic Party, entering into a new government of national unity. NS ran in the Sanmarinese election of 2012 as in coalition with the ultimately victorious PDCS.

In 2013 the party opposed joining the EU in the 2013 Sammarinese referendum.

In 2023, the party merged with the Socialist Ideals Movement, the Ēlego for a New Republic, and a faction of the Socialist Party led by former Captains Regent Alessandro Mancini and Giacomo Simoncini to form the new party Reformist Alliance. The Reformist Alliance aligned with the Sammarinese Christian Democratic Party in preparation for the 2024 general election.
