= 2012 San Marino general election =

National election

- 11 November 2012
- All 60 seats in the Grand and General Council; 31 seats needed for a majority
- Turnout: 63.85% (▼4.63pp)
Party	Leader	Vote %	Seats	+/–
SMBC	Pasquale Valentini	50.70	35	−12
IpP	Gian Marco Marcucci	22.28	12	+10
CA	Gastone Pasolini	16.07	9	+4
RETE	Gloria Arcangeloni	6.29	4	New
This lists parties that won seats. See the complete results below.
Results by castelli
Secretary for Foreign Affairs before	Secretary for Foreign Affairs after election
Antonella Mularoni; AP–SMBC	Pasquale Valentini; PDCS–SMBC

General elections were held in San Marino on 11 November 2012. The 60 seats in the Grand and General Council were up to be reshuffled. The previous election, held in 2008, provided the Sammarinese Christian Democratic Party with the largest single parliamentary group. The Party of Socialists and Democrats, although winning more votes than the former, became the main opposition party.

However, for the 2012 elections, the two parties decided to run together, under the banner of the coalition San Marino Common Good. They were joined by the Popular Alliance. Meanwhile, the remaining major parties formed the coalitions Agreement for the Country and Active Citizenship, politically placed in the center and on the left, respectively.

== Coalitions and parties ==
The incumbent Sammarinese Christian Democratic Party (PDCS) is leading a coalition called San Marino Common Good. It was contested by another coalition under the banner Agreement for the Country and a third coalition is called Active Citizenship. Apart from the coalitions, there are also three more parties running on their own: For San Marino, the RETE Movement and San Marino 3.0.

There were 356 candidates for the 60 seats.

Voting centres were open from 7:00 to 20:00.

== Results ==
Party or alliance		Votes	%	Seats
San Marino Common Good	Christian Democrats–We Sammarineses	5,828	29.47	21
San Marino Common Good	Party of Socialists and Democrats	2,832	14.32	10
San Marino Common Good	Popular Alliance	1,319	6.67	4
San Marino Common Good	Coalition votes	49	0.25	–
San Marino Common Good	Total	10,028	50.70	35
Agreement for the Country	Socialist Party	2,393	12.10	7
Agreement for the Country	Union for the Republic	1,651	8.35	5
Agreement for the Country	Sammarinese Moderates	340	1.72	0
Agreement for the Country	Coalition votes	23	0.12	–
Agreement for the Country	Total	4,407	22.28	12
Active Citizenship	United Left	1,808	9.14	5
Active Citizenship	Civic 10	1,325	6.70	4
Active Citizenship	Coalition votes	46	0.23	–
Active Citizenship	Total	3,179	16.07	9
RETE Movement		1,244	6.29	4
For San Marino		556	2.81	0
San Marino 3.0		364	1.84	0
Total		19,778	100.00	60
Valid votes		19,778	93.57	
Invalid/blank votes		1,360	6.43	
Total votes		21,138	100.00	
Registered voters/turnout		33,106	63.85	
Source: San Marino State Secretary of Internal Affairs

Twenty MPs were new to the council, and 10 MPs were women. Additionally, 1,356 of the voting cards had obscene drawings on them, a total of 6.41%, and a high number of void ballots led to accusations of a scandal.
