= Future Republic =

Future Republic Repubblica Futura
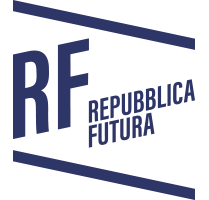
- President: Mara Valentini
- Coordinator: Marco Podeschi
- Deputy Coordinators: Maria Katia Savoretti; Patrizia Pellandra
- Founded: 2016 (electoral list); 24 February 2017 (party)
- Merger of: Popular Alliance; Union for the Republic
- Headquarters: Strada VI Gualdaria 14/a, 47893 Borgo Maggiore
- Youth wing: Future Generation
- Ideology: Liberalism; Pro-Europeanism
- Political position: Centre
- European affiliation: European Democratic Party
- Italian counterparts: More Europe; Italia Viva
- Colours: Blue; White
- Grand and General Council: 8 / 60

Website
- repubblicafutura.sm

Future Republic (Italian: Repubblica Futura, RF) is a centrist political party in San Marino which was formerly governing with Democratic Socialist Left and Civic 10.

The party was formed on the 24th and 25 February 2017 by a merger of the Popular Alliance (AP) and the Union for the Republic (UPR).

The youth wing of the party is Future Generation (Italian: Generazione Futura). It is a part of the Young Democrats for Europe, the youth wing of the European Democratic Party, which RF is a member of.

== Overview ==
For the 2016 election, the Popular Alliance (AP) and the Union for the Republic (UPR) formed a coalition and ran under the winning Adesso.sm alliance. They received 11 seats.

One of the 11 Grand Councillors, Margherita Amici, is part of the delegation of San Marino to the Parliamentary Assembly of the Organization for Security and Co-operation in Europe.

Within the State Congress, two Secretaries of State are from Future Republic: Nicola Renzi as Secretary of State for Foreign, Political Affairs and Justice and Marco Podeschi as Secretary of State for Education, Culture, University, Justice, Research, Information, Sport, Innovation and Relations with the Azienda Autonoma di Stato per i Servizi Pubblici.

Following this electoral success, the two parties decided in February 2017 to merge and create a new party.

Future Republic is a member of the European Democratic Party since 31 July 2017.

== Electoral history ==
Grand and General Council
Election	Leader	Votes	%	Seats	+/–	Government
2016	Mario Venturini	1,865	9.60 (#4)	11 / 60	▲6	Coalition
2019	Mario Venturini	1,850	10.29 (#5)	6 / 60	▼5	Opposition
2024	Roberto Giorgetti	2,178	11.98 (#4)	8 / 60	▲2	Opposition
