= Union for the Republic (San Marino) =

Italian political party

Union for the Republic Unione per la Repubblica
- Founded: 4 March 2011
- Dissolved: February 2017
- Merger of: DdC; EPS
- Merged into: RF
- Ideology: Christian democracy Pro-Europeanism
- Political position: Centre
- National affiliation: Agreement for the Country
- Colours: Gold

Website
- http://www.upr.sm/

The Union for the Republic (Italian: Unione Per la Repubblica, UPR) was a centrist, Christian-democratic political party in San Marino. The party was formed on 4 March 2011 by a merger of the Centre Democrats (DdC) and Euro-Populars for San Marino (EPS).

During the Sammarinese election of 2012 the party ran as part of the losing Agreement for the Country alliance, obtaining 5 seats.

The party formed a coalition with the Popular Alliance for the Sammarinese election of 2016 and following their electoral success, the two parties created a new party, Future Republic.
