= 2024 San Marino general election =

- 9 June 2024
- All 60 seats in the Grand and General Council; 31 seats needed for a majority
- Turnout: 50.73% (▼5.00pp)
Party	Leader	Vote %	Seats	+/–
PDCS	Marino Albani	34.14	22	+1
Libera/PS	Paolo Albani	15.75	10	−4
PSD	Milena Gasperoni	12.19	8	+4
RF	Federico Bascucci	11.98	8	+2
DML	Mirella Andreini	8.47	5	+1
AR	Andreina Bartolini	6.98	4	New
RETE	Marianna Bucci	5.07	3	−8
This lists parties that won seats. See the complete results below.
Results by castelli
Secretary for Foreign Affairs before	Secretary for Foreign Affairs after election
Luca Beccari; PDCS–DeL	Luca Beccari; PDCS–DeL

General elections were held in San Marino on 9 June 2024.

== Electoral system ==
The 60 members of the Grand and General Council are elected by proportional representation, with seats allocated using the d'Hondt method. The electoral threshold is calculated by multiplying the number of parties running in the elections by 0.4, with a maximum possible threshold of 3.5%.

If no party receives a majority, or the two largest parties are unable to form a coalition government within thirty days of the elections, a runoff election will be held between the two most popular coalitions, with the winner receiving a majority jackpot to give them a majority.

== Campaign ==
A political collaboration between Future Republic (RF) and Area Democratica was announced on 18 April 2024. Area Democratica nominated some of its representatives on the RF list as independent candidates for the election.

An electoral alliance was formed for the elections:

- Reformist Alliance (Alleanza Riformista), an alliance of Movimento Ideali Socialisti, We Sammarineses, and Ēlego.

On 18 April, a coalition was formed between the Sammarinese Christian Democratic Party and the Reformist Alliance, known as Democracy and Freedom.

On 24 April an coalition of the Party of Socialists and Democrats, Libera San Marino and the Socialist Party was launched.

== Electoral lists ==
#	List name	№1 on the list	Main ideologies	Political position	Candidates total	Note
1–2	Coalition Libera/PS – PSD; Libera, PSD, PS	Paolo Albani (Libera/PS); Milena Gasperoni (PSD)	Social democracy Pro-Europeanism	Centre-left	52 (Libera/PS); 31 (PSD)	
3–4	Coalition Democracy and Freedom; PDCS, AR (NS, MIS, Ēlego)	Marino Albani (PDCS); Andreina Bartolini (AR)	Christian democracy	Centre	52 (PDCS); 33 (AR)	
5	Solidary Democracy; DEMOS	Alessandro Rossi	Democratic socialism Vaccine hesitancy	Left-wing	18	
6	Future Republic; RF	Federico Bascucci	Liberalism; Pro-Europeanism	Centre	43	
7	Domani Motus Liberi; DML	Mirella Andreini	Liberalism; Christian democracy	Centre	42	
8	RETE Movement; RETE	Marianna Bucci	Environmentalism; Anti-corruption; Progressivism	Left-wing	20	

== Seat projections ==
Publisher	Publication date	Sample size	DeL		Libera/PS–PSD		RF	RETE	DML	DEMOS	Majority
Publisher	Publication date	Sample size	PDCS	AR	Libera/PS	PSD	RF	RETE	DML	DEMOS	Majority
Libertas.sm	18 May 2024	n/a	19	3	14	4	8	5	4	3	4

== Results ==
Party or alliance		Votes	%	Seats	+/–
Democracy and Freedom	Christian Democratic Party	6,206	34.14	22	+1
Democracy and Freedom	Reformist Alliance	1,268	6.98	4	New
Democracy and Freedom	Coalition votes	69	0.38	0	0
Democracy and Freedom	Total	7,543	41.50	26	New
Libera/PS – PSD	Libera / Socialist Party	2,862	15.75	10	0
Libera/PS – PSD	Party of Socialists and Democrats	2,216	12.19	8	0
Libera/PS – PSD	Coalition votes	64	0.35	0	0
Libera/PS – PSD	Total	5,142	28.29	18	0
Future Republic		2,178	11.98	8	+2
Domani Motus Liberi		1,540	8.47	5	+1
RETE Movement		922	5.07	3	–8
Solidary Democracy		852	4.69	0	New
Total		18,177	100.00	60	0
Valid votes		18,177	93.46		
Invalid/blank votes		1,271	6.54		
Total votes		19,448	100.00		
Registered voters/turnout		38,338	50.73		
Source: Secretariat of State for Internal Affairs and Civil Service
