= Party of Democrats =

Party of Democrats Partito dei Democratici
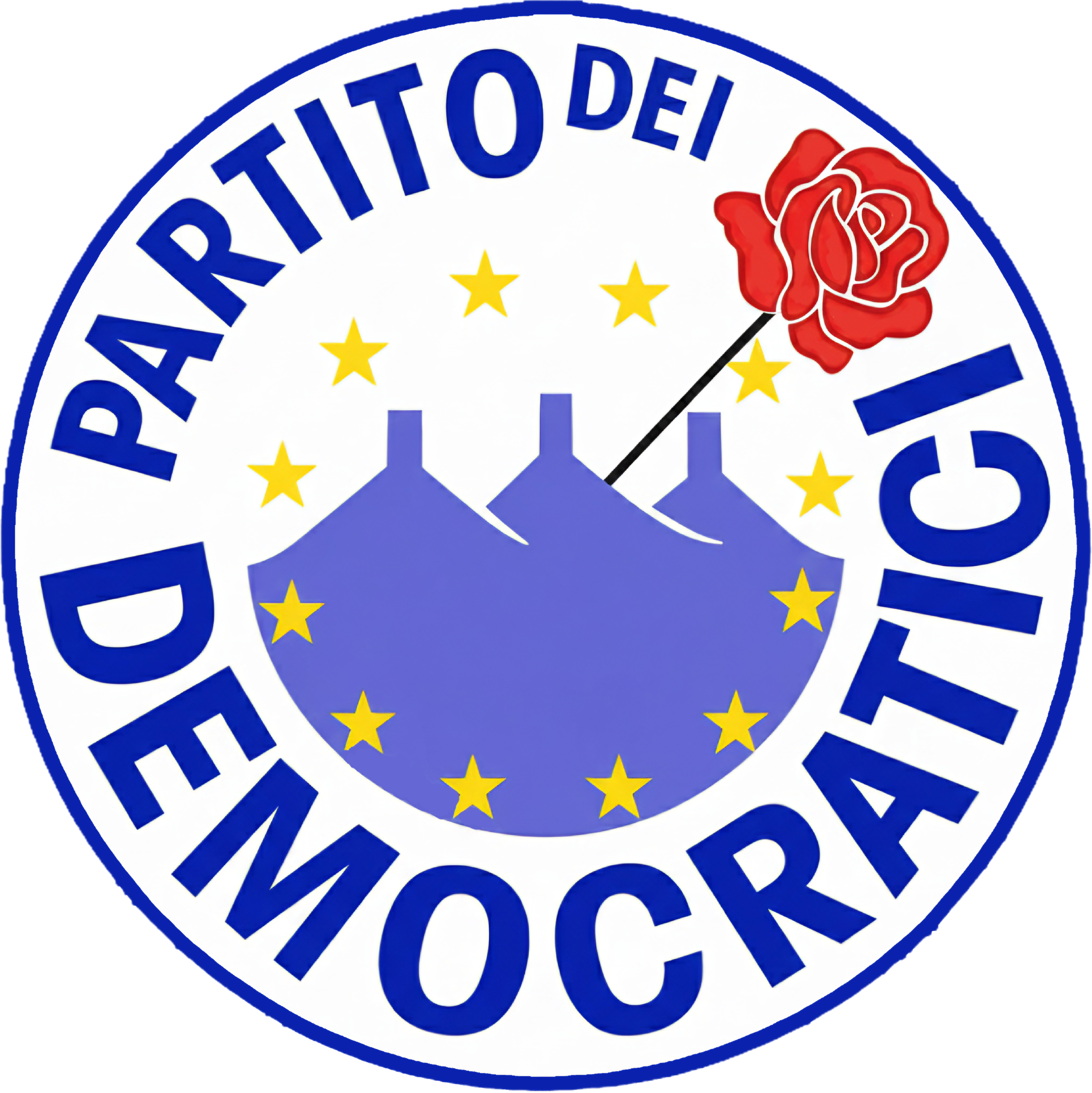
- Founded: 25 March 2001
- Dissolved: 25 March 2005
- Merger of: PPDS; Ideas in Motion; Socialists for Reform
- Merged into: Party of Socialists and Democrats
- Ideology: Social democracy Democratic socialism
- Political position: Centre-left
- International affiliation: Socialist International
- Italian counterpart: Democrats of the Left
- Colours: Red

Website
- www.democratici.sm

The Party of Democrats (Italian: Partito dei Democratici, PD) was a social-democratic and democratic socialist political party in San Marino. Its counterpart in Italy was the Democrats of the Left.

The PD had its origins in Sammarinese Communist Party (PCS), which had changed its name to the Sammarinese Democratic Progressive Party (PPDS) in 1990. On 25 March 2001 the PPDS merged with Ideas in Motion and the Socialists for Reform to form the PD. In 2005 the party finally merged with the Sammarinese Socialist Party (PSS) to form the Party of Socialists and Democrats (PSD). This led to the split of the left-wing faction, which formed the Left Party (PdS).

== See also ==
- Democrats of the Left
