= Civic 10 =

Movement Civic10 Movimento Civico10
- Abbreviation: Civico10
- Leader: Franco Santi
- Founder: Matteo Ciacci
- Founded: 30 July 2012
- Dissolved: 14 November 2020
- Merged into: Libera San Marino
- Ideology: Social democracy Populism; Environmentalism; E-democracy; Anti-particracy; Pro-Europeanism
- Political position: Centre-left
- National affiliation: Active Citizenship (2012); Adesso.sm (2016); Libera (2019)
- Colours: Light blue

Website
- civico10.org

Movement Civic10 (Italian: Movimento Civico10) was a political party in San Marino. It has been described as left-leaning and populist, and also advocated for e-democracy and a basic income.

== History ==
The party was established on 30 July 2012 and contested the 2012 general elections as part of the Active Citizenship alliance. It received 6.7% of the vote, winning four seats.

The party was pro-European, and supported the positive of San Marino joining the European Union in the 2013 referendum.

The party contested the 2016 general election as a member of the Adesso.sm, winning 9.3% the vote and – due to the majority bonus system – gaining six seats.

In the 2019 general election, the party was a component of the Libera San Marino alliance, which won 16.5% of the votes and ten seats, of which Civic 10 took five.

The Civic 10 Movement dissolved on 14 November 2020 due to the formation of Libera San Marino as a unitary party.

It has been described as a valence populist party.

== Election results ==
=== Grand and General Council ===
Election	Leader	Votes	%	Seats	+/–	Status
2012	Gloria Arcangeloni	1,325	6.70 (#6)	4 / 60	—N/a	Opposition
2016	Gloria Arcangeloni	1,800	9.27 (#5)	10 / 60	▲6	Coalition
2019	Franco Santi	Part of Libera		5 / 60	▼5	Opposition
