= United Left (San Marino) =

United Left Sinistra Unita
- Founded: 2 August 2006 (coalition); 2012 (party)
- Dissolved: 10 November 2017
- Merger of: RCS and PdL
- Merged into: Democratic Socialist Left
- Headquarters: Domagnano, San Marino
- Ideology: Democratic socialism Communism; Environmentalism; Euroscepticism
- Political position: Left-wing
- National affiliation: Active Citizenship
- European affiliation: Party of the European Left
- Italian counterpart: The Left – The Rainbow and Left Ecology Freedom
- Colours: Red

Website
- www.sinistraunita.sm

United Left (Italian: Sinistra Unita, SU) was a left-wing political party in San Marino.

== History ==
It was founded as a coalition on 2 August 2006, by the Sammarinese Communist Refoundation, formed by those who did not agree with the transformation of the Sammarinese Communist Party into the Sammarinese Democratic Progressive Party in 1992, and the Left Party, a split from the Party of Democrats in 2005. Its Italian counterpart was Left and Freedom.

In the Sammarinese parliamentary election, 2006, the alliance won 8.67% of the votes cast and took five seats. The United Left was part of the governing coalition that governed San Marino from 2006 to 2008 along with the Party of Socialists and Democrats and the Popular Alliance of Sammarinese Democrats for the Republic until tensions between itself and the latter caused the coalition to disintegrate.

For the 2008 general election United Left was part of the Reforms and Freedom electoral coalition which won 25 seats out of 60 in the Grand and General Council gaining 45.78% of the national vote. The United Left itself gained 5 seats and 8.57% of the national vote.

Looking to the good results of the alliance, the two parties merged in a single one in 2012. During the election of 2012, SU created a leftist alliance with Civic 10 called Active Citizenship which obtained the 16% of votes. SU itself maintained its five seats.

On 10 November 2017, the party is dissolved and merged into the new party Democratic Socialist Left.
