= Party of Socialists and Democrats =

Party of Socialists and Democrats Partito dei Socialisti e dei Democratici
- Abbreviation: PSD
- President: Silvia Cecchetti
- Secretary: Luca Lazzari
- Founded: 18 February 2005
- Merger of: PSS and PdD
- Headquarters: Via Rovellino, 12 – Murata
- Youth wing: Socialist Youth Area of San Marino
- Ideology: Social democracy Democratic socialism Pro-Europeanism
- Political position: Centre-left
- National affiliation: Libera-PS/PSD
- European affiliation: Party of European Socialists
- International affiliation: Socialist International
- Italian counterparts: Democratic Party; Italian Socialist Party
- Colours: Red
- Grand and General Council: 8 / 60

Website
- www.psd.sm

The Party of Socialists and Democrats (Italian: Partito dei Socialisti e dei Democratici, PSD) is a social-democratic and democratic socialist political party in San Marino. It is a member of the Socialist International, and observer member of the Party of European Socialists. It is the only Sammarinese party with a reference to the European Union in its official political symbol. Its current-day Italian counterpart is the Democratic Party.

== History ==
The PSD was formed in 2005 by a merger of the Sammarinese Socialist Party (PSS), the oldest political party in the country founded in 1892, and the Party of Democrats (PdD). At the party's formation it had 27 of 60 seats in the Grand and General Council, which was reduced to 20 in the 2006 general election. The PSS long governed as the junior partner in a coalition with the Sammarinese Christian Democratic Party, while PD had its origins in the Sammarinese Communist Party founded in 1921.

The merger of the two parties provoked the exit of the centrist wing of PSS, which launched the New Socialist Party and of the socialist wing of PD, which formed the Left Party and joined the Sammarinese Communist Refoundation into forming the United Left, while 2 other splinters, led by Fabio Berardi and Nadia Ottaviani, both members of the Grand and General Council, who considered the PSD to be too left-wing, split in September 2008 to form the Arengo and Freedom party. Another split in 2009 in Borgo Maggiore formed the Sammarinese Reformist Socialist Party.

In the 2006 general election PSD won 31.8% of the vote and 20 out of 60 seats and governed in coalition from 2006 to 2008 with the Popular Alliance and United Left until tensions between the latter two caused the coalition to disintegrate.

For the 2008 general election the PSD allowed the smaller Sammarinese for Freedom party run as part of its electoral list and was part of the Reforms and Freedom electoral coalition which won 25 seats out of 60 in the Grand and General Council gaining 45.78% of the national vote but failed to gain a governmental majority and as a result the Party of Socialists and Democrats which itself gained 18 seats (a few of which went to Sammarinese for Freedom) out of the 25 the coalition gained and 31.96% of the national vote, and became part of the official opposition to the government of the centre-right coalition Pact for San Marino.

After the Sammarinese political crisis of 2011, PSD entered in a new government of national unity with Sammarinese Christian Democratic Party (PDCS). For the 2012 general election, the PSD ran as part of the winning San Marino Common Good coalition led by the Sammarinese Christian Democratic Party, restoring the political formula which had run San Marino until the 1990s.

The party contested the 2016 general election as part of San Marino First, along with the PDCS and Socialist Party (PS). The alliance formed the opposition to the Adesso.sm alliance led by the Democratic Socialist Left, which one the second round runoff election on 4 December 2016.

In April 2024 the party launched an alliance with the PS and Libera San Marino for the 2024 general election, referred to as the Liberal/PS–PSD coalition.

In the party's congress that was held between 26 and 27 October 2024, Luca Lazzari was elected as its Secretary and Silvia Cecchetti as its President.
