= Sammarinese Christian Democratic Party =

Political party in San Marino

Sammarinese Christian Democratic Party Partito Democratico Cristiano Sammarinese
- Abbreviation: PDCS
- President of the Central Council: Alice Mina
- Political Secretary: Gian Carlo Venturini
- Deputy Political Secretary: Manuel Ciavatta
- Founder: Luigi Sturzo
- Founded: 9 April 1948; 78 years ago
- Preceded by: Sammarinese People's Party (not official)
- Headquarters: Via delle Scalette 6 - San Marino
- Ideology: Christian democracy
- Political position: Centre-right
- National affiliation: Democracy and Freedom
- European affiliation: European People's Party (observer)
- International affiliation: Centrist Democrat International
- Italian counterpart: Forza Italia (since 2013); The Populars (since 2002); Italian People's Party (1994–2002); Christian Democracy (until 1994)
- Colours: Blue and white Light blue (customary)
- Grand and General Council: 22 / 60

Website
- pdcs.sm

The Sammarinese Christian Democratic Party (Italian: Partito Democratico Cristiano Sammarinese, PDCS) is a Christian-democratic political party in San Marino.

== History ==
Origins and foundation

Many Catholics, in order to counteract the forces of the left, joined the newly formed Democratic Union at the end of 1944. However, the autonomous political organization of Catholic democrats began in 1947 with the creation of sections in all the Castelli of San Marino. The first section was that of Acquaviva, which was founded on July 6, 1947. The promoters of the new party were keen to establish links with the Christian Democrats in Italy, and on December 21, 1947, some leaders organized a trip to Rome to meet Don Luigi Sturzo. The party was officially founded on April 9, 1948, after completing its initial organization throughout the country, announced by a poster that was displayed in the Castelli.

The names of the members of the provisional executive committee are listed at the bottom of the poster: Romano Belluzzi, Domenico Mario Calmi, Antonio Gatti, Germano Guidi, Giuseppe Guidi, Delio Masi, Guido Michelotti, Antonio Morganti, Antonio Simbeni, Giovanni Tonnini, Eugenio Vicini, and Zaccaria Savoretti, who served as secretary.

The first elections in which the party participated were those of February 27, 1949, with the Democratic Union and the Independent Patriotic Labor Association, all united in the Popular Alliance, which won 25 of the 60 seats.

The Fatti di Rovereta and further developments

The PDCS was involved in of one of the most tense episodes in San Marino's political life. The socialist-communist electoral alliance, which emerged victorious from the 1955 elections with 35 out of 60 councilors, lost its absolute majority when five socialist councilors left to join the opposition, forming the Independent Socialist Party of San Marino. On September 18, 1957, Attilio Giannini, an independent elected from the ranks of the Communist Party, also left the former majority, allowing the PDCS to form a majority coalition consisting of 23 Christian Democrat councilors, 5 independent socialists, 2 social democrats, and the independent councillor Giannini.

The Captains Regent Giordano Giacomini and Primo Marani, faced with the resignation of the majority of councilors (who had had to sign a blank letter of resignation in order to stand as candidates for their own parties), were forced to dissolve the Grand and General Council and call elections for November 3, thereby effectively extending their own term of office. The representatives of the new majority considered the measure illegitimate and attempted to enter the Palazzo Pubblico to elect the new government, but found the gendarmerie lined up to block the entrance for several days. On September 30, at the end of the regency's term, the 31 elected representatives gathered in a factory in Rovereta, where they formed a provisional government. Tension grew enormously, as did fears of an armed clash between the parties, partly due to the Regency's decision to create a volunteer militia. On October 11, the Captains Regent recognized the government and disbanded the militia. On October 14, the new government took office at the Palazzo Pubblico.

Recent years: Between opposition and government

The PDCS is an observer member of the European People's Party (EPP), having joined the EPP in 1993. Its Italian counterpart was the now-dissolved Christian Democracy. Its internal left-wing faction left in 2006 to form the Centre Democrats and was joined by the social democrats of Arengo and Freedom. It is led by Giovanni Lonfernini, a former Captain-Regent.

In the 2006 general election PDCS won 32.9% of the vote and 21 out of 60 seats in the Grand and General Council. The party stood in opposition to the 2006-2008 governing political coalition of Party of Socialists and Democrats, Popular Alliance and United Left.

For the 2008 general election the party was part of the Pact for San Marino coalition and gave hospitality in its list to some candidates of the Euro-Populars for San Marino and Arengo and Freedom. The electoral coalition won 35 seats out of 60 in the Grand and General Council in the 2008 general election gaining 54.22% of the national vote and a governmental majority of 5, becoming the new government of San Marino. The Sammarinese Christian Democratic Party which itself gained 22 seats (a few of which went to Euro-Populars for San Marino and Arengo and Freedom) out of the 35 coalition and gained 31.90% of the national vote. Ernesto Benedettini became one of the two Joint Captains Regent of San Marino.

A political crisis in 2011 dissolved the old majority, and the PDCS formed a government of national unity with the Party of Socialists and Democrats, whose predecessors worked with the PDCS for decades, so restoring a political formula which led San Marino, and Italy, during the second half of the 20th century. The new alliance, San Marino Common Good, won the Sammarinese election of 2012, PDCS obtaining 21 seats together with their electoral running-mates, We Sammarinese.

In the 2016 general election, the PDCS retained relative majority, but the coalition to which it belongs, “San Marino First,” together with the Socialist Party and the Party of Socialists and Democrats, lost the runoff.

From March 3 to 5, 2017, the PDCS held its 20th General Congress, entitled “The Roots of the New.” Filippo Tamagnini chaired the congress. At the end of the proceedings, Giancarlo Venturini was elected as the new Secretary General, taking over from the outgoing secretary Marco Gatti. Venturini received 201 votes out of 308 voters (out of 316 delegates). The second candidate for the Secretariat was Teodoro Lonfernini.

== Election results ==
=== Grand and General Council ===
Election	Votes	%	Seats	+/–	Position
1949	–	–	14 / 60	–	2nd
1951	1,917	43.03	26 / 60	▲12	▲1st
1955	2,006	38.25	23 / 60	▼3	1st
1959	2,815	44.26	27 / 60	▲4	1st
1964	5,939	46.83	29 / 60	▲2	1st
1969	5,708	44.02	27 / 60	▼2	1st
1974	5,451	39.63	25 / 60	▼2	1st
1978	6,380	42.30	26 / 60	▲1	1st
1983	7,068	42.07	26 / 60	–	1st
1988	9,001	44.13	27 / 60	▲1	1st
1993	9,010	41.37	26 / 60	▼1	1st
1998	8,907	40.85	25 / 60	▼1	1st
2001	9,031	41.45	25 / 60	–	1st
2006	7,257	32.92	21 / 60	▼4	1st
2008	6,692	31.91	22 / 60	▲1	1st
2012	5,828	29.47	21 / 60	▼1	1st
2016	4,752	24.46	16 / 60	▼5	1st
2019	5,993	33.35	21 / 60	▲11	1st
2024	6,206	34.14	22 / 60	▲1	1st
