= Popular Alliance (San Marino) =

Popular Alliance Alleanza Popolare
- Leader: Mario Venturini
- President: Diego Ercolani
- Founded: 10 January 1993
- Dissolved: 24 February 2017
- Merged into: Future Republic
- Headquarters: Strada VI Gualdaria, 14/a, 47893 Borgo Maggiore
- Ideology: Liberalism
- Political position: Centre
- European affiliation: European Democratic Party
- Italian counterpart: Lega Nord
- Colours: Green

Website
- www.alleanzapopolare.net

The Popular Alliance (Italian: Alleanza Popolare, AP) was a liberal-centrist political party in San Marino. The party formed a coalition with the Union for the Republic for the 2016 Sammarinese general election, and following their electoral success the two parties created a new party, Future Republic.

== History ==
AP was born as an anti-establishment party in 1993, in parallel with the rise of Lega Nord in Italy, of which it has been long considered the Sanmarinese counterpart, but has since then become a stable political force in San Marino, participating in government coalitions with the centrist Sammarinese Christian Democratic Party (PDCS), as well as with the centre-left Party of Socialists and Democrats (PSD) since 2002. Instead of the Monument to the Warrior of Legnano, AP has the Statua della Libertà as their symbol.

In the 2006 Sammarinese general election the party won 12.1% of the vote and 7 out of 60 seats in the Grand and General Council, making it the third-largest party of the country. In 2008 after the breaking-up of the governing coalition, due to the rising clashes between AP and United Left, under the new electoral system, the party decided to join PDCS in the centrist Pact for San Marino coalition for the 2008 general election, gaining 11.5% of votes and 7 seats out of the 35 of the coalition gained and 11.52% of the national vote. Assunta Meloni became one of the two Joint Captains Regent of San Marino.

After the political crisis of 2011, AP confirmed its alliance with PDCS, creating the new alliance San Marino Common Good, which won the 2012 Sammarinese general election, even though AP itself lost three seats.

For the 2016 Sammarinese general election, AP broke its alliance with PDCS and formed the Future Republic electoral list with Union for the Republic, which was a part of the Adesso.sm coalition. The list won eleven seats in the election's second round run-off.

On 24 February 2017, AP and UpR officially merged and formed Future Republic as a political party.

== See also ==
- Liberalism by country
- List of political parties in San Marino
