= Great and General Council =

Unicameral parliament of San Marino

Coordinates: 43°56′12″N 12°26′47″E

Great and General Council Consiglio Grande e Generale
- XXXI Legislature

Type
- Type: Unicameral

History
- Founded: 13th century (traditional); 1906 (modern form)
- New session started: 2 July 2024

Leadership
- Captains Regent: Gerardo Giovagnoli (PSD); William Casali (PDCS) since 1 October 2026

Structure
- Seats: 60
- Political groups: Government (44): PDCS (22); Libera-PS (10); PSD (8); AR (4); Opposition (16): RF (8); DML (5); RETE (3)
- Length of term: 5 years

Elections
- Voting system: Majority bonus system
- First election: 10 June 1906
- Last election: 9 June 2024

Meeting place
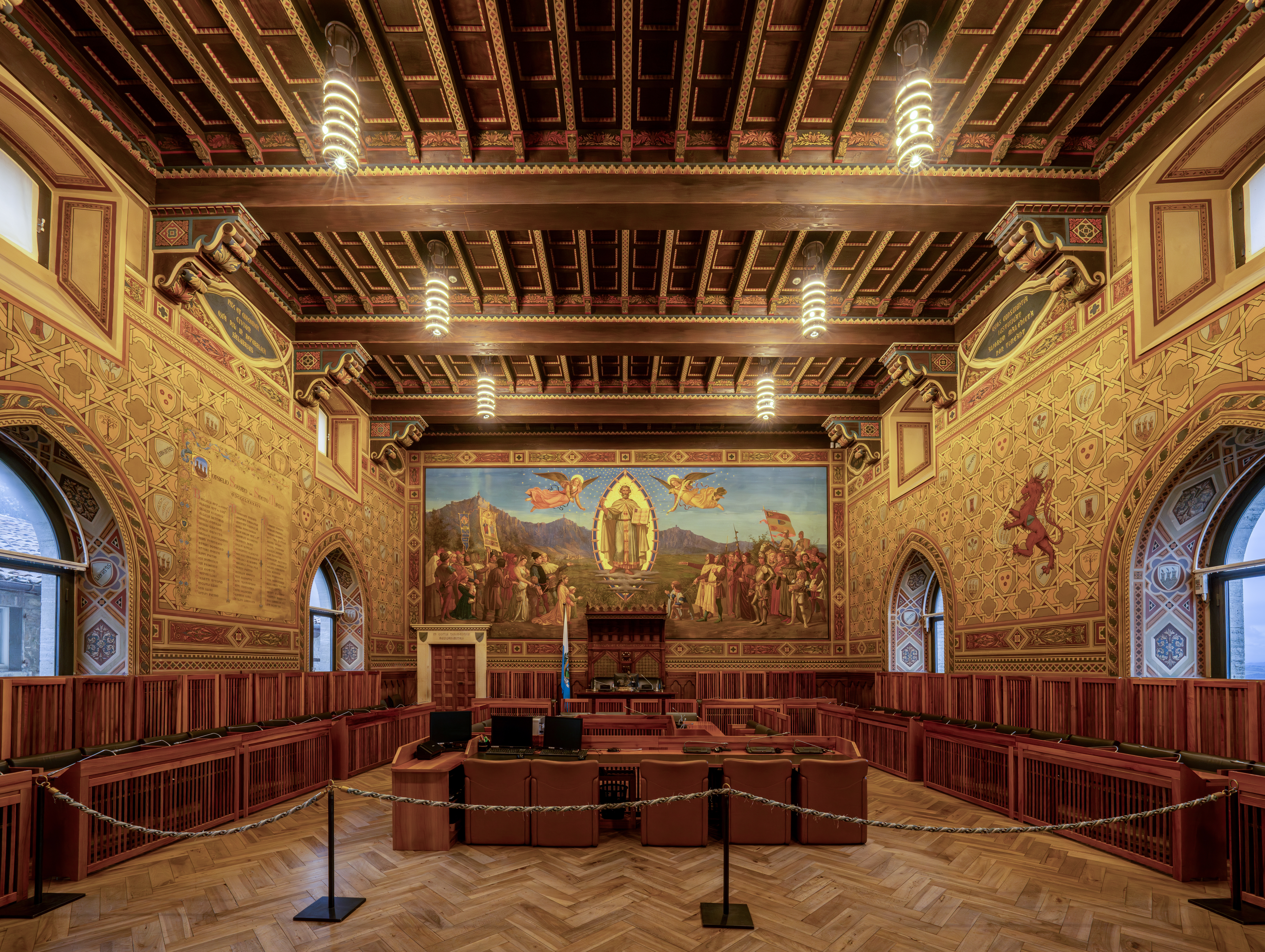
- Palazzo Pubblico; City of San Marino, San Marino

Website
- Great and General Council

Constitution
- Constitution of San Marino

The Great and General Council (Italian: Consiglio Grande e Generale; Romagnol: Grând e Gnèral Cunsèj) is the unicameral parliament of San Marino. The council has 60 members elected for a five-year term.

== History ==
From the 5th century, San Marino was ruled by an assembly composed by all the family heads known as the Arengo. However, as the population grew, such a body became more and more dysfunctional, with its functioning being crippled by feuds between families.

While the exact timing is unknown, there is historical evidence that by the early 13th century, the citizens of San Marino elected an assembly called Council of the LX, which was also known as the Great and General Council. In this first stage the power was shared between the Arengo and the Council, with the latter gaining more and more power over the centuries. This process culminated in the Statutes of 1600, which defined the Council as the "supreme, absolute and only prince" of the community, attributing to it "the right over life, death and goods of every citizen" together with every power needed to rule and manage the country. Until the 17th century, members of the Council were periodically elected by the Arengo, then the Statutes of 1600 established that the Council could autonomously nominate its members by co-optation. This led to an increasing concentration of power in the hand of the richest families, which were also the only ones that could afford to pay for the necessary education. The oligarchic nature of the council became even clearer when, between the 17th and 18th centuries, laws were passed to formally establish a noble class with 20 seats reserved to it.

This situation ended on 25 March 1906 when the Arengo was summoned once again after centuries and in which householders were asked whether the system of co-option of councillors for life should continue. The proposal was rejected by 90.65% of voters, consequently, the country's first modern election was conducted on 10 June 1906.

During the fascist period, between 1923 and 1943, the Great and General Council was dissolved and a new legislature called the Prince and Sovereign Council (Italian: Consiglio Principe e Sovrano) was formed, with all its 60 members belonging to the Sammarinese Fascist Party.

Suffrage was extended to women in 1959, granting to them the possibility to vote for the first time in the 1964 elections.

== Electoral system ==
The country's electoral law is based on the electoral system of Italian municipalities. Between 1945 and 2007, San Marino used proportional representation. A majority of at least 35 seats is given to the winning coalition of parties which receives an absolute majority of votes at the first or the eventual second round of elections. Within single coalitions, seats are divided between the parties using a D'Hondt system. A 3.5% threshold exists, together with guarantees for female candidates.

== Powers ==
The Council appoints from among its members the Congress of State, which is the executive branch of the government, and the Captains Regents, who serve as the heads of state.

== Electoral results ==
Party or alliance		Votes	%	Seats
Democracy and Freedom	Christian Democratic Party	6,206	34.14	22
Democracy and Freedom	Reformist Alliance	1,268	6.98	4
Democracy and Freedom	Coalition votes	69	0.38	0
Democracy and Freedom	Total	7,543	41.50	26
Libera/PS – PSD	Libera / Socialist Party	2,862	15.75	10
Libera/PS – PSD	Party of Socialists and Democrats	2,216	12.19	8
Libera/PS – PSD	Coalition votes	64	0.35	0
Libera/PS – PSD	Total	5,142	28.29	18
Future Republic		2,178	11.98	8
Domani Motus Liberi		1,540	8.47	5
RETE Movement		922	5.07	3
Solidary Democracy		852	4.69	0
Total		18,177	100.00	60
Valid votes		18,177	93.46	
Invalid/blank votes		1,271	6.54	
Total votes		19,448	100.00	
Registered voters/turnout		38,338	50.73	
Source: Secretariat of State for Internal Affairs and Civil Service

== See also ==
- Politics of San Marino
- Arengo
- List of legislatures by country
