= Elections in San Marino =

San Marino elects on the national level a legislature. The Grand and General Council (Consiglio Grande e Generale) has 60 members, elected for a five-year term by semi-proportional representation with national majority bonus (the winning coalition receives at least 35 seats on 60).

San Marino has a multi-party system, with numerous parties in which no one party often has a chance of gaining power alone, and parties must work with each other to form coalition governments.

The first elections were held in March 1906 after the Arengo held on the same year that established democracy in the country. Between 1926 and 1943, the Sammarinese Fascist Party took power and all other parties were banned. Democracy was restored in 1945.

Since early 2008, there has been an electoral threshold of 3.5%. Since 2016, if none of the coalitions achieves an absolute majority of seats, a runoff between the two largest coalitions is held.

== General elections ==
=== Last election ===
A parliamentary election was held in San Marino on 9 June 2024.

Party or alliance		Votes	%	Seats	+/–
Democracy and Freedom	Christian Democratic Party	6,206	34.14	22	+1
Democracy and Freedom	Reformist Alliance	1,268	6.98	4	New
Democracy and Freedom	Coalition votes	69	0.38	0	0
Democracy and Freedom	Total	7,543	41.50	26	New
Libera/PS – PSD	Libera / Socialist Party	2,862	15.75	10	0
Libera/PS – PSD	Party of Socialists and Democrats	2,216	12.19	8	0
Libera/PS – PSD	Coalition votes	64	0.35	0	0
Libera/PS – PSD	Total	5,142	28.29	18	0
Future Republic		2,178	11.98	8	+2
Domani Motus Liberi		1,540	8.47	5	+1
RETE Movement		922	5.07	3	–8
Solidary Democracy		852	4.69	0	New
Total		18,177	100.00	60	0
Valid votes		18,177	93.46		
Invalid/blank votes		1,271	6.54		
Total votes		19,448	100.00		
Registered voters/turnout		38,338	50.73		
Source: Secretariat of State for Internal Affairs and Civil Service

=== Election results, 1945–2024 ===
Summary of Sammarinese elections for the Grand and General Council, 1945–2024
Election	Round	PSDS	PCS	PSS	PDCS	PSIS	MLS	SR	AP	SU	AN	PSD	PS	UPR	C10	RETE	RF	DML	NplR	Libera	Oth.	Turnout
1945		(PDCS)	66.0	(PCS)	34.0																	57.4
1949		(PDCS)	57.7	(PCS)	42.3																	67.5
1951		5.6	29.3	22.1	43.0																	62.6
1955		4.7	31.6	25.5	38.2																	70.1
1959		(PSIS)	26.0	13.8	44.3	15.9																85.7
1964			24.1	10.7	46.8	16.2	2.2															84.0
1969			22.8	11.9	44.0	18.0	2.1														1.2	79.5
1974			23.6	13.9	39.6	15.4	1.6														5.9	79.7
1978			25.1	13.8	42.3	11.1		4.2													3.5	79.0
1983			24.4	14.8	42.1	13.9		2.9													1.9	79.7
1988			28.7	11.1	44.1	13.6		1.1													1.4	81.1
1993			18.6	23.7	41.4				7.7	3.4											5.2	80.0
1998			18.6	23.2	40.9			4.2	9.8	3.3												75.3
2001			20.6	24.0	41.1				9.0	3.4	1.9											73.8
2006			(PdS)	(PdS)	32.9				12.1	8.7	2.3	31.8	5.4								6.8	71.8
2008					31.9				11.5	8.6	4.2	32.0	6.3	4.9							0.7	68.5
2012					29.5				6.7	9.1	1.7	14.3	12.1	8.4	6.7	6.3					5.2	63.9
2016	1st				24.5				9.6	12.1		7.2	7.7	(AP)	9.3	18.3					11.3	59.7
2016	2nd				42.1				(SU)	57.9		(PDCS)	(PDCS)		(SU)							50.1
2019					33.4							(NplR)	(NplR)			18.2	10.3	6.2	13.1	16.5	2.0	55.7
2024					34.14							12.19				5.07	11.98	8.47		15.75	12.40	50.73

== Local elections ==
Local elections are held every 5 years in all the municipalities, to elect the municipal councils (giunte di castello) and the mayors (capitani di castello). The last elections were held on 29 November 2020. Proportional representation is used to allocate the seats. Voters have up to 2 preference votes.

== Referendums ==
- Sammarinese citizenry meeting, 1906
- 1982 Sammarinese citizenship referendum
- 1996 Sammarinese electoral law referendum
- 1997 Sammarinese referendum
- 1999 Sammarinese citizenship referendum
- 2003 Sammarinese voting system referendum
- 2005 Sammarinese electoral law referendum
- 2008 Sammarinese referendum
- 2011 Sammarinese public property referendum
- 2013 Sammarinese referendum
- 2014 Sammarinese referendum
- 2016 Sammarinese referendum

== See also ==
- Electoral calendar
- Electoral system
- List of political parties in San Marino
