= Fatti di Rovereta =

Constitutional crisis in San Marino

- Part of the Cold War
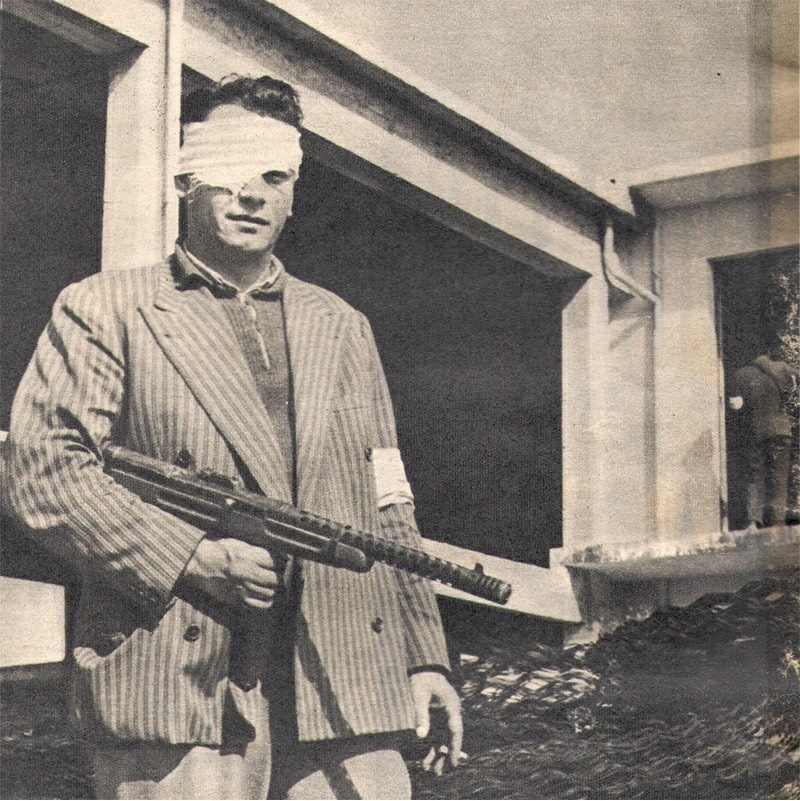
- An armed militant belonging to the San Marino provisional government in Rovereta
- Date: 19 September – 11 October 1957 (22 days)
- Location: San Marino
- Result: Provisional government victory

Parties
San Marino: Sammarinese Communist Party; Sammarinese Socialist Party	San Marino provisional government: Sammarinese Christian Democratic Party; Sammarinese Independent Democratic Socialist Party; Italy; Supported by: United States; France

Lead figures
(San Marino) Domenico Morganti	(San Marino) Federico Bigi

Number
(San Marino) 250	(San Marino) 200 (Italy) 150

Casualties and losses
- None

The fatti di Rovereta (Italian: "Rovereta affair") was a constitutional crisis that occurred in San Marino from 19 September to 11 October 1957. The Committee of Freedom lost its majority in the Grand and General Council in protest of its reaction to the Hungarian Revolution of 1956. The Grand and General Council was deliberately rendered inquorate by the Committee of Freedom to prevent the scheduled election of the Captains-Regent. Opposition led by the Sammarinese Christian Democratic Party established a provisional government in the village of Rovereta supported by Italy, with the government and provisional government forming militias as San Marino appeared to be heading towards civil war.

The Committee of Freedom conceded after a 22-day standoff and the provisional government was recognised as legitimate by the Captains-Regent. The fatti di Rovereta marked the end of San Marino having the only Communist government in Western Europe, and the beginning of the Christian Democratic Party's dominance in Sammarinese politics.

== Background ==
Following the end of World War II in 1945, the Sammarinese Fascist Party was removed from power and the 1945 general election was held. The Committee of Freedom, a left-wing coalition of the Sammarinese Socialist Party and Sammarinese Communist Party, won 40 of the 60 seats in the Grand and General Council. It was the first ever democratically-elected Communist government, and made San Marino the only Communist-ruled state in Western Europe.

Both the middle class and working class supported the Committee of Freedom out of fear that San Marino would return to being ruled by an oligarchy of local patrician families. The government instituted several reforms; of the industries of San Marino, the government only nationalized three drugstores. Within the context of the Cold War, the United States launched a boycott of the economy of San Marino in response to the communist-majority government. Additionally, the United States put pressure on Italy to not respect any agreements made with the country. This made San Marino extremely poor, but the Communist Party continued to receive a significant enough amount of the public vote to remain in power.

The Committee of Freedom won 35 seats in the 1949 general election and 31 seats in the 1951 general election, nearly losing its majority. The Committee of Freedom returned to 35 seats in the 1955 general election, but five moderate Socialist councilmen (Alvaro Casali, Domenico Forcellini, Giuseppe Forcellini, Federico Micheloni, and Pio Galassi) wanted to break the alliance with the Communists in the aftermath of the Hungarian Revolution of 1956. The Sammarinese Communist Party, who were close to the Soviet Union, did not condemn the Soviets' violent suppression in Hungary; this led to international condemnation and strained the image of Soviet-style Communism, even among Western European Communist parties.

The Socialist leadership was itself split between those who condemned Soviet actions in Hungary and those who did not. In April 1957, the five Socialists left to form a new party, the Sammarinese Independent Democratic Socialist Party (PSDIS). This left a perfect 30–30 split in the council, with the Committee of Freedom losing their majority and paralyzing the government. The Captains-Regent, given the deadlock, avoided convening the council until the mandatory 19 September regency election to choose their replacements.

== Crisis ==
A day before the election, one Communist councillor became an independent and joined the opposition, giving them the majority. However, it was the practice of the Socialist and Communist parties to enforce party discipline by making their councillors sign letters of resignation after each election, with the date left blank. The party chiefs submitted to the regency all 35 letters, including the six who left their parties, with the date of 19 September. With the majority of seats vacant in the council, there was no quorum, so the Regency dissolved the council until new general elections could be held on 3 November. The status of the sitting Regency was uncertain because the council did not elect new regents to replace them once their terms expired on 1 October, causing a constitutional crisis.

The Regency ordered the Corps of Gendarmerie to seal off the Palazzo Pubblico in the City of San Marino, preventing any councillors from entering. The opposition was in an uproar as the six defectors claimed their resignations were invalid and what transpired was a coup d'etat. Federico Bigi, leader of the Sammarinese Christian Democratic Party, led his men into a church and declared the Communist government illegal, forming an executive council. The Communists claimed they would arrest the ex-council members and so they went underground.

On 28 September, the Italian Carabinieri and soldiers set up roadblocks on highways leading into San Marino, and refused passage to anyone besides journalists and foreign tourists. This was to keep communists from Emilia-Romagna and Marche from supporting the government in San Marino, as the opposition government was immediately recognized by Italy. Eventually, no one was allowed in or out including food shipments and medicines. On the night of 30 September, near midnight, the opposition council and a few supporters occupied an abandoned factory in the village of Rovereta in Serravalle, in northern San Marino on the border with Italy. At the stroke of midnight, when the Regency should have expired, the opposition councillors declared a provisional government of San Marino. It was immediately recognized by France, the United States, and Italy.

Soon after, both the Communist and provisional governments began to organize militias as the police force declared neutrality. Italy also sent in a force of 150 Carabinieri to support the provisional government and protect the three sides of the factory that sat in their territory. Initially, the Communists only had 150 men armed with German World War II-era machine guns to 1891 muskets. The provisional government had a smaller 100-man force, but was armed with more modern weapons. The Communists sent a letter to the United Nations asking for them to send a peacekeeping force but they were denied. By 2. October, both forces had grown by about 100 men and a Communist militant shot at an anti-Communist militant but missed. No other shots were fired as neither side wanted to shed blood.

== Resolution ==
On 11 October, after 22 days of a tense standoff, the Regency caved in and recognized the provisional government as legitimate, ending the crisis. The new government elected a new regency. One of its acts was to provide for women's suffrage. The 1959 general election was held two years later, confirming the victory of the Christian Democrat–PSDIS coalition with a comfortable 36 seats, and ending the Committee of Freedom's 12 years in power. This coalition government remained in power until the 1974 general election, when the Christian Democrats opted to form a coalition with the Socialists. The Christian Democrats themselves would govern San Marino continuously until the 2016 general election, and have remained the single-largest party in the country as of 2025.

== Bibliography ==
- Maria Antonietta Bonelli a cura di Valentina Rossi, 1957 Rovereta, Minerva Edizioni in collaborazione con la Fondazione San Marino, Bologna, 2011, ISBN 8873813496
- Claudio Visani, Gli intrighi di una Repubblica. San Marino e Romagna, 80 anni di storia raccontati dai protagonisti. Prefazione di Sergio Zavoli. Bologna, Pendragon Edizioni, 2012 ISBN 8865981776
