= 1969 International Meeting of Communist and Workers Parties =

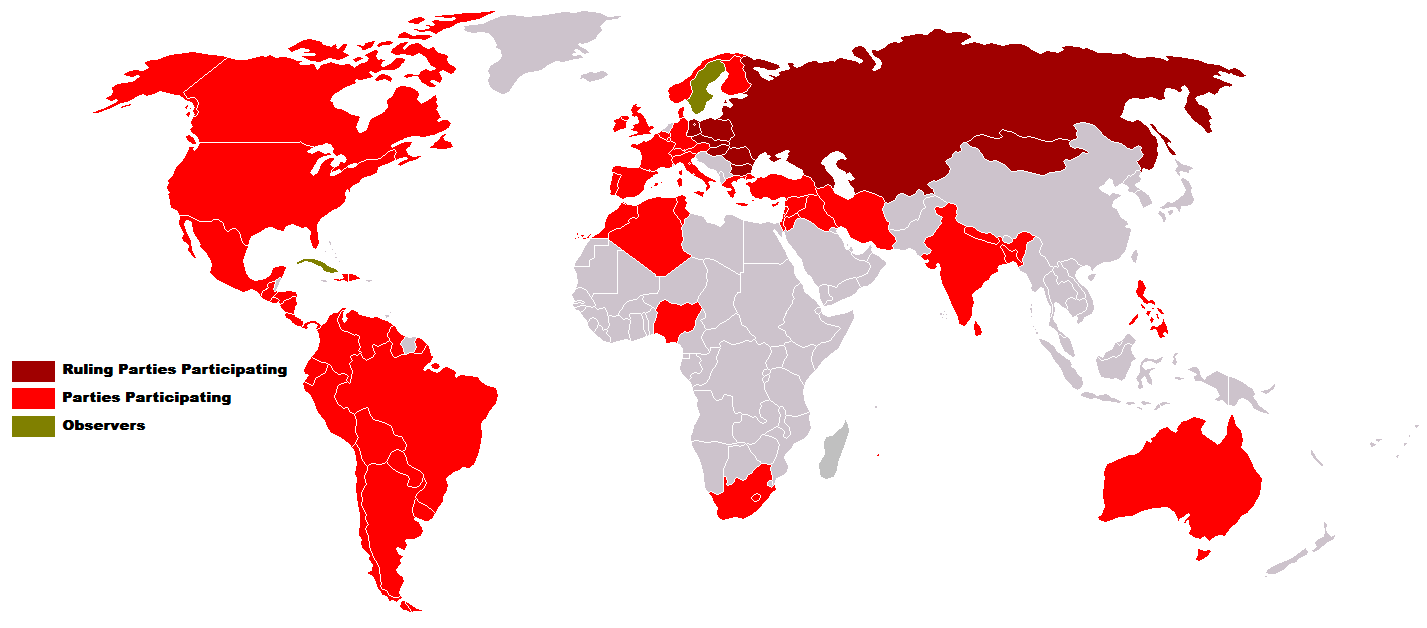
Parties participating in the event

On 5–17 June 1969, an International Meeting of Communist and Workers Parties was held in Moscow. The meeting occurred in the aftermath of the Sino-Soviet split and the Prague Spring in 1968. The preceding international meeting, held in Moscow in 1960, had been dominated by disputes between the Communist Party of the Soviet Union on one hand and the Chinese Communist Party (CCP) and the Party of Labour of Albania on the other. By this time the split between the two poles had been finalized. Pro-CCP elements were absent from this event. However the phenomenon of Eurocommunism had begun to emerge, which was notable amongst some of the delegations present.

Notably the Workers' Party of Korea and the Workers Party of Vietnam, both cautious at the time to take a stand in the Sino-Soviet conflict, were absent.

The two main points of discussion of the conference was the strategy of cooperation with anti-imperialist forces and the centenary celebrations of the birth of Lenin. On both issues, the conference approved a document. The document on the Lenin birth centenary was approved unanimously, but the document on the alliances between communist parties and anti-imperialist forces was not signed by the Norwegian, Dominican and British delegations. The Italian, Sammarinese, Austrian and Reunionese delegations only signed one of the four parts of the document.

== Participants ==
Delegation leaders in brackets. Names of some underground parties were left out in official conference reports, and are thus not included here. Participants in italics were from countries where the Communist Party was banned.

=== Socialist Bloc countries ===
- Bulgaria: Bulgarian Communist Party (Todor Zhivkov, First Secretary of the Central Committee)
- Czechoslovakia: Communist Party of Czechoslovakia (Gustáv Husák, First Secretary of the Central Committee)
- East Germany: Socialist Unity Party of Germany (Walter Ulbricht, First Secretary of the Central Committee)
- Hungary: Hungarian Socialist Workers' Party (János Kádár, First Secretary of the Central Committee)
- Mongolia: Mongolian People's Revolutionary Party (Yumjaagiin Tsedenbal, First Secretary of the Central Committee)
- Poland: Polish United Workers' Party (Władysław Gomułka, First Secretary of the Central Committee)
- Romania: Romanian Communist Party (Nicolae Ceaușescu, General Secretary of the Central Committee)
- Soviet Union: Communist Party of the Soviet Union (Leonid Brezhnev, General Secretary of the Central Committee)

=== Africa ===
- Lesotho: Communist Party of Lesotho
- Nigeria: Nigerian Marxist-Leninists (Tunji Otegbeye)
- Réunion: Reunionese Communist Party (Paul Vergès, General Secretary)
- South Africa: South African Communist Party (J. B. Marks, Chairman)

=== Americas ===
- Argentina: Communist Party of Argentina (Rodolfo Ghioldi, Executive Committee of the Central Committee member)
- Bolivia: Communist Party of Bolivia (Jorge Kolle Cueto, First Secretary of the Central Committee)
- Brazil: Brazilian Communist Party (Luís Carlos Prestes, General Secretary of the Central Committee)
- Canada: Communist Party of Canada (William Kashtan, General Secretary)
- Chile: Communist Party of Chile (Luis Corvalán, General Secretary)
- Colombia: Colombian Communist Party (Gilberto Vieira, General Secretary of the Central Committee)
- Costa Rica: Popular Vanguard Party (Manuel Mora, General Secretary of the Central Committee)
- Dominican Republic: Dominican Communist Party (Manuel Sánchez)
- Ecuador: Communist Party of Ecuador (Enrique Gil Gilberto, Executive Committee and Secretariat of the Central Committee member)
- El Salvador: Communist Party of El Salvador (Salvador Cayetano Carpio, General Secretary of the Central Committee)
- Guadeloupe: Guadeloupe Communist Party (Ephremon Gene, General Secretary)
- Guatemala: Guatemalan Party of Labour (Bernardo Alvarado Monzón)
- Guyana: People's Progressive Party (Guyana) (Cheddi Jagan)
- Haiti: Unified Party of Haitian Communists (Jacques Dorcilier)
- Honduras: Communist Party of Honduras (Mario Morales, First Secretary of the Central Committee)
- Martinique: Communist Party of Martinique (Walter Guitteaud, Politburo member)
- Mexico: Mexican Communist Party (Arnoldo Martínez Verdugo, First Secretary of the Central Committee)
- Nicaragua: Socialist Party of Nicaragua (Roberto Santos)
- Panama: People's Party of Panama
- Paraguay: Paraguayan Communist Party (Massiel Campos, Political Commission and Secretariat of the Central Committee member)
- Peru: Peruvian Communist Party (Jorge del Prado, General Secretary of the Central Committee)
- Puerto Rico: Puerto Rican Communist Party (Félix Ojeda, Secretary of the Central Committee)
- Uruguay: Communist Party of Uruguay (Rodney Arismendi, First Secretary of the Central Committee)
- United States: Communist Party USA (Gus Hall, General Secretary)
- Venezuela: Communist Party of Venezuela (Jesús Faría, General Secretary)

=== Asia ===
- Ceylon: Communist Party of Ceylon (S. A. Wickramasinghe, Chairman)
- India: Communist Party of India (S.A. Dange, Chairman of the National Council)
- Pakistan: Communist Party of East Pakistan

=== Middle East ===
- Algeria: Socialist Vanguard Party (Larbi Bouhali)
- Iran: Tudeh Party of Iran (Reza Radmanesh, First Secretary of the Central Committee)
- Iraq: Iraqi Communist Party (Aziz Muhammad, First Secretary of the Central Committee)
- Israel: Communist Party of Israel (Meir Vilner, General Secretary of the Central Committee)
- Jordan: Jordanian Communist Party (Fu'ad Nassar, First Secretary of the Central Committee)
- Morocco: Party of Liberation and Socialism (Ali Yata, General Secretary)
- Lebanon: Lebanese Communist Party
- Sudan: Sudanese Communist Party (Abdel Khaliq Mahjub, General Secretary of the Central Committee)
- Syria: Syrian Communist Party (Khalid Bakdash, General Secretary of the Central Committee)
- Tunisia: Tunisian Communist Party (Mohamed Harmel)
- Turkey: Communist Party of Turkey (Yakub Demir, First Secretary of the Central Committee)

=== Oceania ===
- Australia: Communist Party of Australia (Laurie Aarons, National Secretary)

=== Western Europe ===
- Austria: Communist Party of Austria (Franz Muhri, Chairman)
- Belgium: Communist Party of Belgium (Marc Drumaux, Chairman)
- Great Britain: Communist Party of Great Britain (John Gollan, General Secretary)
- Cyprus: Progressive Party of Working People (Ezekias Papaioannou, General Secretary)
- Denmark: Communist Party of Denmark (Knud Jespersen, Chairman)
- Finland: Communist Party of Finland (Aarne Saarinen, Chairman)
- France: French Communist Party (Waldeck Rochet, General Secretary)
- Greece: Communist Party of Greece (Konstantinos Koligiannis, First Secretary of the Central Committee)
- Ireland: Irish Workers' Party (Michael O'Riordan, General Secretary of the Executive Committee)
- Italy: Italian Communist Party (Enrico Berlinguer, Deputy General Secretary)
- Luxembourg: Communist Party of Luxembourg (Dominique Urbany, Chairman)
- Northern Ireland: Communist Party of Northern Ireland (Hugh Murphy, Executive Committee member)
- Norway: Communist Party of Norway (Reidar Larsen, Chairman)
- Portugal: Portuguese Communist Party (Álvaro Cunhal, General Secretary)
- San Marino: San Marinese Communist Party (Ermenegildo Gasperoni, General Secretary)
- Spain: Communist Party of Spain (Santiago Carrillo, General Secretary)
- Switzerland: Swiss Party of Labour (Jakob Lechleiter, Secretary of the Central Committee)
- West Berlin: Socialist Unity Party of West Berlin (Gerhard Danelius, Chairman)
- West Germany: Communist Party of Germany (Max Reimann, First Secretary of the Central Committee)

== Observers ==
- Cuba: Communist Party of Cuba (Carlos Rafael Rodríguez, Central Committee Secretariat member)
- Sweden: Left Party - Communists (Lars Werner, Deputy Chairman)

== See also ==
- 1960 International Meeting of Communist and Workers Parties
- 1976 Conference of Communist and Workers Parties of Europe

== Sources ==
- Internationale Beratung der kommunistischen und der Arbeiterparteien. Moskau 1969. Prague: 1969, Verlag Frieden und Sozialismus.
