= Popular Alliance (San Marino, historical) =

The Popular Alliance (Italian: Alleanza Popolare) was a political alliance in San Marino.

== History ==
The alliance was formed by the Sammarinese Christian Democratic Party (PDCS), the Sammarinese Democratic Socialist Party (PSDS) and some independents, and was opposed by the Committee of Freedom, an alliance of the Sammarinese Socialist Party (PSS) and the Sammarinese Communist Party (PCS). It won 20 of the 60 seats in the Grand and General Council in the 1945 elections. The 1949 elections saw it increase its representation to 25 seats. The 1951 elections saw it win 26 seats.

The alliance was formally dissolved ahead of the 1955 elections. However, the name "Popular Alliance" was revived in 1957 following the formation of the Sammarinese Independent Democratic Socialist Party (PSDIS), which emerged from a merger between the PSDS and a splinter group from the PSS. The coalition of the Christian Democratic Party (PDCS) and the PSDIS operated under this name until 1973, when the PDCS formed a new government in partnership with the PSS.
