= Clara Boscaglia =

Sammarinese politician

Member of the Grand and General Council
- In office 1974–1990

Personal details
- Born: 1930
- Died: 22 July 1990 (aged 59)
- Party: Sammarinese Christian Democratic Party
- Occupation: Teacher

Clara Boscaglia (1930 – 22 July 1990) was a Sammarinese politician. One of the first women to be elected to the Grand and General Council, she later became the first in San Marino to serve as a government minister.

By profession, Boscaglia was a teacher of Greek and Latin at the high school level. A member of the Sammarinese Christian Democratic Party (SCDP), she was among the founding members of the Confederazione generale democratica dei lavoratori sammarinesi in 1957; she was the parliamentary group leader and political secretary of the SCDP. When in 1973 women earned the right to stand for election in San Marino, she became one of the first four women to be elected to the Grand and General Council in 1974, alongside Anna Maria Casali, Marina Busignani Reffi and Fausta Morganti, although Reffi ultimately declined to take her seat. From 1974 until 1976 she served as the Minister of Public Works; in the latter year, after the government was reshuffled, she became Minister of the Interior and of Justice. She entered the opposition in 1978; with the party's formation of a joint government with the Sammarinese Communist Party in 1986, she became the Secretary for Finance. She retained the post after the 1988 general election. Boscaglia remained a member of the council, and a minister of state, until her death in 1990. In 2010 the twentieth anniversary of her death was observed with a commemorative program discussing her legacy.
