= 1909 San Marino general election =

National election

← 1906	19 June 1909	1912 →
- 20 of the 60 seats in the Grand and General Council; 31 seats needed for a majority
- Turnout: 74.83% (▼11.45pp)
Party	Vote %	Seats	+/–
Independents	100%	20	0
This lists parties that won seats. See the complete results below.

General elections were held in San Marino on 19 June 1909 to elect the second term of the Grand and General Council.

== Electoral system ==
According to the decisions of the Meeting of 1906, a third of the seats in the Grand and General Council should be renewed every three years; to do so, councillors elected in 1906 had been divided into three classes, under the model of the Senate of the United States, by random sortition. The age limit to be an elector was lowered from 25 to 21 on 5 July 1906, but a major change occurred on 6 May 1909, when the Council passed a law establishing male universal suffrage in the country. In addition, the ancient constituency of City of San Marino was divided in two, ceding 10 seats to new constituency of Borgo Maggiore.

All councillors were elected in their constituency using a plurality-at-large voting, a non-partisan system. However, as happened in 1906, candidates elected generally belonged to the liberal group which had supported the democratic action of the Citizenry Meeting or, more, were members of the sole organized party of the country, the Sammarinese Socialist Party. If the political composition of the council did not change significantly, this time the Socialists refused to join the government they left in 1907 after disagreements around industrial and religious themes.

Voters had to be citizens of San Marino, male, the head of the family and 24 years old.

== Results ==
Party	Votes	%	Seats
Independents	1,268	100.00	20
Total	1,268	100.00	20
Valid votes	1,268	97.84	
Invalid/blank votes	28	2.16	
Total votes	1,296	100.00	
Registered voters/turnout	1,732	74.83	
Source: Nohlen & Stöver
