= 1912 San Marino general election =

National election

← 1909	23 June 1912	1915 →
- 20 of the 60 seats in the Grand and General Council; 31 seats needed for a majority
- Turnout: 49.97% (▼24.86pp)
Party	Vote %	Seats	+/–
Independents	100%	20	0
This lists parties that won seats. See the complete results below.

General elections were held in San Marino on 23 June 1912 to elect the third term of the Grand and General Council.

== Electoral system ==
In accordance with the decision of the Meeting of 1906, one third of the seats of the Grand and General Council should be renewed every three years. As a result, twenty of the forty councillors elected in 1906 were chosen by random sortition to finish their term this year.

All councillors were elected in their constituency using a plurality-at-large voting, a non-partisan system. However, as happened in 1906 and 1909, candidates elected generally belonged to the liberal group which had supported the democratic action of the Citizenry Meeting or, more, were members of the sole organized party of the country, the Sammarinese Socialist Party. These two factions returned in alliance to create a government coalition, the Democratic Bloc, which worked around public schools and forms of insurance for workers.

Voters had to be citizens of San Marino, male, the head of the family and 24 years old.

== Results ==
Party	Votes	%	Seats
Independents	711	100.00	20
Total	711	100.00	20
Valid votes	711	98.48	
Invalid/blank votes	11	1.52	
Total votes	722	100.00	
Registered voters/turnout	1,445	49.97	
Source: Nohlen & Stöver
