= 1915 San Marino general election =

National election

← 1912	13 June 1915	1918 →
- 20 of the 60 seats in the Grand and General Council; 31 seats needed for a majority
- Turnout: 57.06% (▲7.09pp)
Party	Vote %	Seats	+/–
Independents	100%	20	0
This lists parties that won seats. See the complete results below.

General elections were held in San Marino on 13 June 1915 to elect the fourth term of the Grand and General Council.

== Electoral system ==
According to the decisions of the Meeting of 1906, a third of the seats in the Grand and General Council should be renewed every three years. The twenty councillors elected in 1906 finished their term this year.

All councillors were elected in their constituency using a plurality-at-large voting, a non-partisan system. However, as previously happened, candidates elected generally belonged to the liberal group which had supported the democratic action of the Citizenry Meeting or, more, were members of the sole organized party of the country, the Sammarinese Socialist Party. This time the Socialists refused to join the government they left in 1913 following the reject of their fiscal reform.

Voters had to be citizens of San Marino, male, the head of the family and 24 years old.

== Results ==
Party	Votes	%	Seats
Independents	1,059	100.00	20
Total	1,059	100.00	20
Valid votes	1,059	98.88	
Invalid/blank votes	12	1.12	
Total votes	1,071	100.00	
Registered voters/turnout	1,877	57.06	
Source: Nohlen & Stöver
