= Ideas in Motion =

Left-wing political party in San Marino

Ideas in Motion (Italian: Idee in Movimento, IM) was a left-wing political party in San Marino.

== History ==
The party was established in 1998 by Alessandro Rossi as a successor to the Democratic Movement, which had won two seats in the 1993 elections. It contested the elections later that year in an alliance with the Sammarinese Democratic Progressive Party (PPDS) and the Democratic Convention. The alliance received 18.6% of the vote, winning 11 of the 60 seats in the Grand and General Council, becoming the third-largest faction.

In 2001 it merged with the PPDS and Socialists for Reform to form the Party of Democrats.
