= 1918 San Marino general election =

National election

← 1915	9 June 1918	1920 →
- 20 of the 60 seats in the Grand and General Council; 31 seats needed for a majority
Party	Vote %	Seats	+/–
Independents	100%	20	0
This lists parties that won seats. See the complete results below.

General elections were held in San Marino on 9 June 1918 to elect the fifth term of the Grand and General Council.

== Electoral system ==
According to the decisions of the 1906 Sammarinese citizenry meeting, a third of the seats in the Grand and General Council should be renewed every three years. Twenty councillors, elected in 1909, finished their term this year.

All councillors were elected in their constituency using a plurality-at-large voting, a non-partisan system. However, as previously happened, candidates elected generally belonged to the liberal group which had supported the democratic action of the Citizenry Meeting or, more, were members of the sole organized party of the country, the Sammarinese Socialist Party, which claimed to have won 14 seats. The election fell in a period of social tensions caused by the inflation of the Italian lira during World War I, and the Socialists refused to join the government following many popular protests against heavy prices.

Voters had to be citizens of San Marino, male, the head of the family and 24 years old.

== Results ==
Party	Votes	%	Seats
Independents	1,672	100.00	20
Total	1,672	100.00	20
Source: Nohlen & Stöver
