= 1976 Conference of Communist and Workers Parties of Europe =

International meeting of communist parties in East Berlin

Coordinates: 52°31′21″N 13°24′48″E

Conference of Communist and Workers Parties of Europe
- Host country: German Democratic Republic
- Date: June 29–30, 1976
- Venues: Interhotel Stadt Berlin, Alexanderplatz, East Berlin
- Participants: Eastern Europe Brezhnev Ceauşescu Gierek Husák Honecker Kádár Tito Zhivkov Western Europe Carrillo Berlinguer Marchais Cunhal
- Follows: 1969 International Meeting of Communist and Workers Parties

The Conference of Communist and Workers Parties of Europe was an international meeting of communist parties, held in the city of East Berlin, capital of the communist-governed East Germany, on 29–30 June 1976. In all, 29 parties from all Europe (except Albania, Iceland and some microstates) participated in the conference.

The conference highlighted several important changes in the European communist movement. It exhibited the declining influence of the Communist Party of the Soviet Union and a widening gap between the independent and orthodox camps amongst European communist parties, with the ascent of a new political trend, Eurocommunism.

== Background ==
Held in Moscow, the 1969 International Meeting of Communist and Workers Parties was a debacle for its Soviet hosts, as several parties (most notably the Workers' Party of Korea and the Workers Party of Vietnam), had boycotted the event, whilst others had used the meeting as a platform to condemn the Soviet Union's 1968 military intervention in Czechoslovakia. Following the 1969 colloquium, proposals were put forward for another international conference, with the Communist Party of the Soviet Union hoping to regain its lost prestige through such an event. However, many constituents of the world communist movement, primarily in Asia but also in Europe, were opposed to the holding of another international conference. Rather than holding a meeting representing the global communist movement, by the mid-1970s, most of the main communist parties in Europe had expressed an interest in holding a specifically European conference instead. During that decade, several political changes had occurred in Western Europe that various communist parties wanted to take advantage of; notably, Spain and Portugal had witnessed the transition from Fascist regimes to representative democracies, while the parliamentary isolation faced by the French and Italian communist parties had come to an end.

During the 1970s, a new theoretical trend had emerged in several Western European communist parties that came to be known as Eurocommunism. Rejecting the domination of the Soviet Communist Party, it emphasized the development of theories and practices that were more applicable to Western Europe. The Soviet government disliked this Eurocommunist trend, and hoped that through holding a conference, they could achieve a document constituting a de facto charter of the European communist movement which would maintain their dominant role. Soviet discourse did at the time emphasize the importance of a united communist movement across the continent, denying differences between parties and labelling the distinction between Eastern and Western Europe as artificial.

== Preparations ==
There was a prolonged process of preparation before the conference convened. Intense negotiations took place between October 1974 and June 1976, although accounts vary as to how many meetings actually took place, with claims ranging from 12 to 16. The first preparatory meeting was held in Warsaw, capital of Poland. Throughout the preparatory process, the Spanish, Italian, French, Romanian and Yugoslav parties pressed for recognition of the autonomy of each party, whilst the Czechoslovaks, Polish, Hungarians, Bulgarians and East Germans rallied to the defense of Soviet positions. The disagreements during the preparatory process delayed the conference for a year.

At an early stage, an agreement was reached that any document approved by the conference would have to be adopted by consensus. Another agreement was that the agenda of the conference would be limited to themes relating to peace, security, disarmament and the struggle for social progress. The last two editorial meetings for the drafting of the conference resolution were held in East Berlin on June 10–11 and June 24, 1976.

Unlike the previous International Meetings of Communist and Workers Parties, the League of Communists of Yugoslavia participated in the preparations and the conference (however, the Party of Labour of Albania did not participate). The Communist Party of Greece (Interior), a Eurocommunist splinter group, was barred from participating in the conference. The Icelandic People's Alliance boycotted the conference.

Parallel to the conference preparations, the Italian Communist Party organized two bilateral events with its two main Eurocommunist counterparts; a meeting with the Communist Party of Spain in Livorno in July 1975 and a summit with the French Communist Party in Rome in the summer 1976. The Eurocommunists were not a solid bloc, and sharp differences between the parties were manifested during the preparatory process. The French party, whilst criticizing the lack of civil liberties in the Soviet Union, was hesitant to give up proletarian internationalism for the concept of international solidarity proposed by the Italians. Differences on how to analyze the situation in Portugal following the Carnation Revolution divided the French and Italian parties. The French voiced their support for the strategy of the Portuguese Communist Party whilst the Italians publicly criticized the Portuguese party.

== Debates and document ==
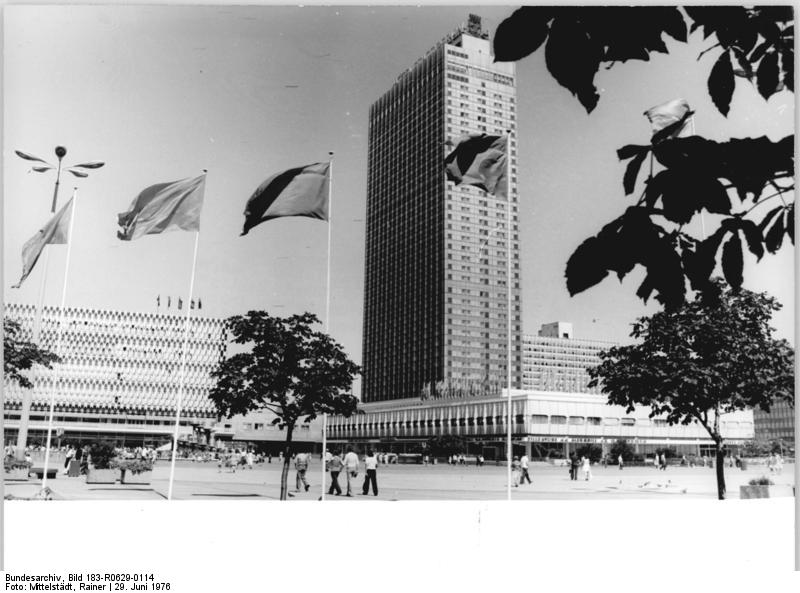
The venue of the conference, the Interhotel Stadt Berlin

Albeit without direct polemical exchanges, speeches made at the conference showed the diversity of positions held by communist parties. In their speeches, Santiago Carrillo, Enrico Berlinguer and George Marchais decried aspects of the Soviet political system. Berlinguer stated that West European communists favoured a democratic state, political pluralism, freedom of expression, free trade unions and religious freedoms. In his address to the assembled delegates, the Yugoslav leader Josip Broz Tito stated that "[c]ommunists must accept different roads in the struggle for socialism, independence, equality and non-interference in internal affairs". The Romanian leader Nicolae Ceaușescu also voiced support for principles of independence of individual parties and non-interference. Other participants that argued for the Eurocommunist cause at the conference were Lars Werner from Sweden, Gordon McLennan from Britain, Ermenegildo Gasperoni from San Marino and, to a lesser extent, the Finnish Communist Party chief Aarne Saarinen.

On the other hand, there were also interventions from other delegates whom re-affirmed their adherence to the line of the Soviet party. The Bulgarian communist leader Todor Zhivkov, in his intervention, took a firmer stand than the Soviets in upholding the notion of general laws of socialist development (as opposed to the idea that each party should develop its own way of building socialism), denouncing revisionism and underlining the dual responsibility of the individual communist party (both to its own people and the world communist movement). Gustáv Husák of Czechoslovakia and the East German host, Erich Honecker, were also amongst the prominent spokespersons of the orthodox camp. Other parties that voiced their support for the Soviets, in varying degrees, were the Greek, Portuguese, West German, Luxembourgish, Danish, West Berlin, Turkish, Norwegian and Austrian parties.

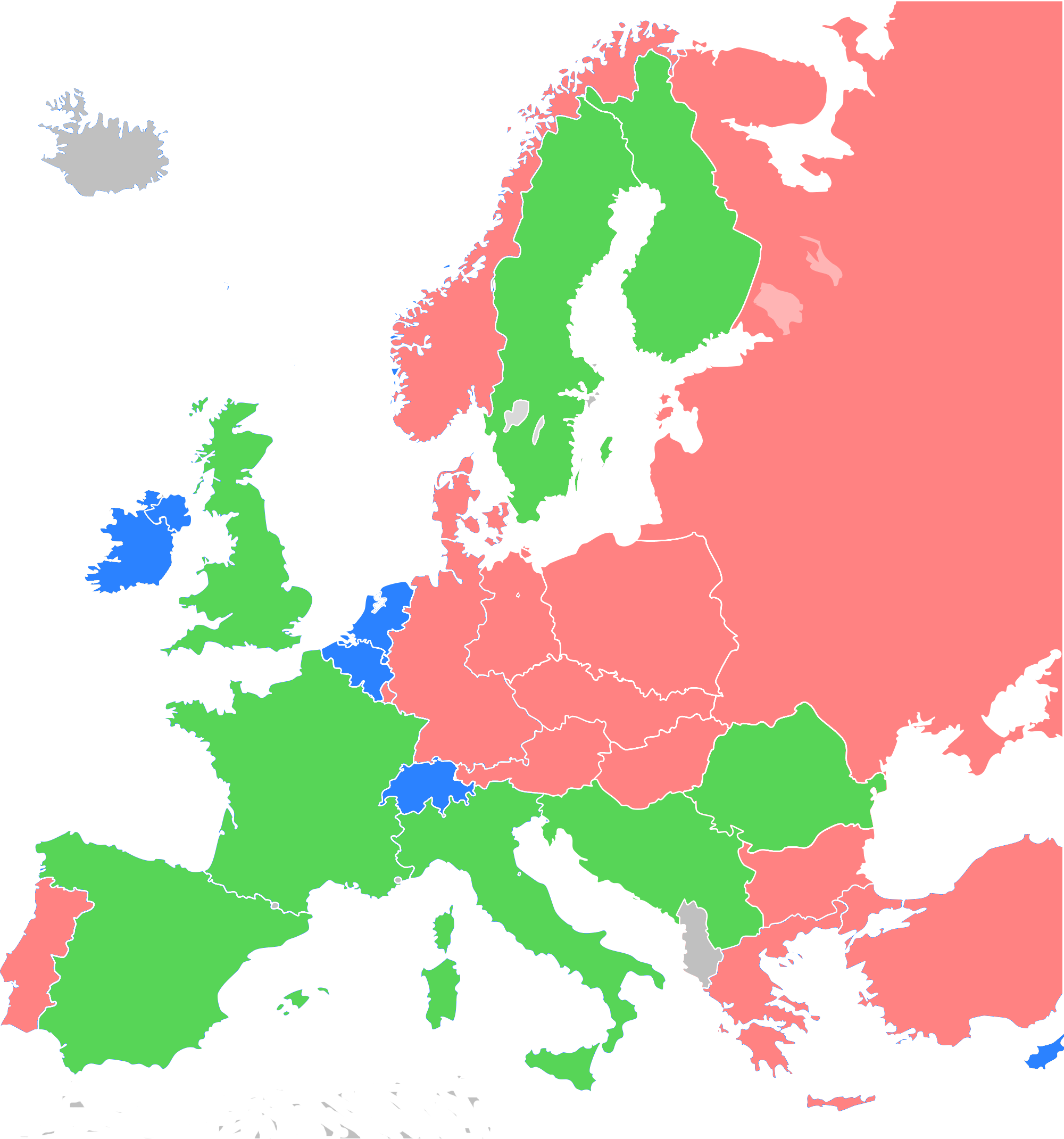
Positions of the European communist parties at the 1976 Berlin Conference: Red = Orthodox or Pro-Soviet camp Green = Eurocommunist or Independent camp Blue = Neutral group Grey = Boycott

The Soviet party leader Leonid Brezhnev adopted a more conciliatory tone than his orthodox colleagues. He urged the conference to reaffirm its commitment to proletarian internationalism, but without references to dual responsibility and mutual assistance (which had been cornerstones of Soviet discourse on the subject). Edward Gierek of Poland and János Kádár of Hungary also placed themselves within the orthodox camp in their speeches to the conference, but kept a lower profile and expressed certain individual nuances.

Apart from the main antagonists at the Berlin meeting, there was also a grouping of parties that were reluctant to choose either the Eurocommunist or the orthodox side. This grouping included the Cypriot, Belgian, Dutch, Irish and Swiss delegates.

The final document of the conference was titled "For Peace, Security, Cooperation and Social Progress in Europe". The document contained several novelties compared to previous practices in the world communist movement. One of the most prominent features of the document was the recognition of the principle of "equality and independence of all communist parties and their right to decide their own policies without external interference". The Soviet party had thus, at least in theory, conceded to the Eurocommunist demands for the principle of non-interference in the affairs of other parties. The document carried no mention of Marxism-Leninism, instead there was a reference to the 'great ideas' of Karl Marx, Friedrich Engels and V. I. Lenin. References to 'proletarian internationalism' were substituted with the term 'international solidarity'. Moreover, the document stated that fraternal criticism between communist parties would not constitute anti-communism (implying that criticism of Soviet policies would not be considered as 'anti-Sovietism', as the official Soviet discourse had argued). The document was not approved through signature or a vote, it was simply issued, a fact later criticized by the Yugoslavs.

The conference also endorsed the Helsinki process and international human rights covenants.

Unlike the declaration of the 1969 meeting, the Berlin conference document did not contain any condemnation of China. The Soviets had pushed for a condemnation of China ahead of the conference, but the Yugoslavs, the French and the Italians resisted these moves.

At the Berlin conference, the French Communist Party rejected the possibility of holding future conferences on the same lines.

== Aftermath ==
The speeches at the conference were presented in full in Neues Deutschland, the central organ of the Socialist Unity Party of Germany, whilst the more critical aspects were censored out in the reports in the Soviet newspaper Pravda. In particular, the speech of Carrillo was very difficult for the Soviets to digest. Pravda sought to portray the conference as a victory for proletarian internationalism and communist unity, downplaying the divisions that had appeared at the meeting. Other Eastern Bloc newspapers also censored speeches from the conference.

Following the Berlin conference, the Eurocommunists would step up their critiques of Soviet policies further. They began to foster relations with dissidents in the Eastern Bloc and, occasionally, defended them against state repression.

The Soviet party at times responded in kind to Eurocommunist critiques through veiled ideological counter-accusations. A notable counter-attack by the orthodox camp was an article by Zhivkov in Problems of Peace and Socialism in December 1976, which decried Eurocommunism as an anti-Soviet 'subversion against proletarian internationalism'.

The Yugoslav party on its side claimed that the Soviets had corrupted the conference documentation and tried to portray a greater degree of unity between the parties than what had actually been the case at the conference.

In April 1980, a new European conference was held in Paris, but under different terms. The principle of consensus was gone at the Paris conference, and the Italian, Romanian, Spanish, Yugoslav, Icelandic, British, Dutch and Sammarinese communist parties boycotted the event. The French Communist Party, co-sponsors of the meeting together with the Polish United Workers' Party, rejected the notion that the Paris meeting would have been of a similar kind as the Berlin conference as no common positions on strategy had been approved.

== Participants ==
Country	Party	Head of Delegation	Ruling/ Parliamentary	Membership	% of pop. as members	Ref(s)
Austria	Communist Party of Austria	Franz Muhri; Chairman	0 / 183 1975 election	20,000	0.25%	
Belgium	Communist Party of Belgium	Jean Terfve; Vice Chairman	2 / 212 1974 election	15,000	0.15%	
Bulgaria	Bulgarian Communist Party	Todor Zhivkov; First Secretary	Ruling			
Cyprus	Progressive Party of Working People	Christos Petas; Politburo Member	9 / 35 1970 election	14,000	2.33%	
Czechoslovakia	Communist Party of Czechoslovakia	Gustáv Husák; General Secretary	Ruling			
Denmark	Communist Party of Denmark	Knud Jespersen; Chairman	7 / 175 1975 election	8,000	0.16%	
Finland	Communist Party of Finland	Aarne Saarinen; Chairman	40 / 200 1975 election, figures for SKDL	50,000	1%	
France	French Communist Party	George Marchais; General Secretary	73 / 488 1973 election	700,000	1.32%	
German Democratic Republic	Socialist Unity Party of Germany	Erich Honecker; General Secretary	Ruling			
Federal Republic of Germany	German Communist Party	Herbert Mies; Chairman	0 / 496 1972 election	40,000	0.07%	
Greece	Communist Party of Greece	Charilaos Florakis; First Secretary	5 / 300 1974 election			
Great Britain	Communist Party of Great Britain	Gordon McLennan; General Secretary	0 / 635 1974 election	25,000	0.05%	
Hungary	Hungarian Socialist Workers' Party	János Kádár; First Secretary	Ruling			
Ireland	Communist Party of Ireland	Michael O'Riordan; General Secretary	0 / 144 1973 election (South) 0 / 78 1975 election (North)	600	0.01%	
Italy	Italian Communist Party	Enrico Berlinguer; General Secretary	227 / 630 1976 election	2,000,000	3.57%	
Luxembourg	Communist Party of Luxembourg	Dominique Urbany; Chairman	5 / 59 1974 election	1,000	0.25%	
Netherlands	Communist Party of the Netherlands	Henk Hoekstra; Chairman	7 / 150 1972 election	14,000	0.1%	
Norway	Communist Party of Norway	Martin Gunnar Knutsen; Chairman	1 / 155 1973 election	2,500	0.06%	
Poland	Polish United Workers' Party	Edward Gierek; First Secretary	Ruling			
Portugal	Portuguese Communist Party	Álvaro Cunhal; General Secretary	40 / 263 1976 election	160,000	1.6%	
Romania	Romanian Communist Party	Nicolae Ceaușescu; General Secretary	Ruling			
San Marino	Sammarinese Communist Party	Ermenegildo Gasperoni; Chairman	15 / 60 1974 election	1,000	5.26%	
Soviet Union	Communist Party of the Soviet Union	Leonid Brezhnev; General Secretary	Ruling			
Spain	Communist Party of Spain	Santiago Carrillo; General Secretary	Illegal	200,000	0.56%	
Sweden	Left Party - Communists	Lars Werner; Chairman	19 / 350 1973 election	17,000	0.21%	
Switzerland	Swiss Party of Labour	Jakob Lechleiter; Secretary of the Central Committee	5 / 200 1975 election	7,000	0.12%	
Turkey	Communist Party of Turkey	İsmail Bilen; General Secretary	Illegal	2,000	0.005%	
West Berlin	Socialist Unity Party of West Berlin	Erich Ziegler; Vice Chairman	0 / 147 1975 election	5,000	0.25%	
Yugoslavia	League of Communists of Yugoslavia	Josip Broz Tito; Chairman	Ruling			

== See also ==
- Cominform
- 1st Conference of the Communist Parties of Latin America
- 1960 International Meeting of Communist and Workers Parties
- 1969 International Meeting of Communist and Workers Parties
- International Meeting of Communist and Workers' Parties
