= Union of Sammarinese Women =

Sammarinese women organization

Union of Sammarinese Women (Italian: Unione Donne Sammarinesi, UDS) is a civil association based in San Marino and founded in 1972 that works for equal rights and opportunities between men and women in the country.

Among the Union's greatest achievements are promoting the 1982 referendum to amend the citizenship law to repeal the provision whereby women lose their nationality when they marry a foreigner, reforming family law to include measures proposed by the Union, and promoting the 2021 referendum to legalise abortion, playing a key active role in the "Yes" successful campaign.

Since 2024, its current president is Valentina Rossi.

== Background ==
San Marino introduced women's suffrage following the 1957 constitutional crisis known as Fatti di Rovereta. Sammarinese women received the right to vote in 1960. They received the right to hold political office in 1973.

== History ==
In the 1970s, there was a movement of women who considered organising a movement independent of political parties. In April 1971, Marina Busignani Reffi founded the Comitato per l'emancipazione della donna sammarinese (Committee for the Emancipation of San Marino Women), which was made up of Busignani Reffi, Graziella Rossini, Luciana Franchini and Emma Rossi. Their initial demands included the possibility of holding public and civil offices, equal pay, pensions for housewives, etc. The Captains Regent accepted passive suffrage for women and legal and social emancipation, but after months without any measures being implemented and a political crisis, the Committee managed to form a Commission at the Grand and General Council to study the demands. They achieved measures such as pensions for housewives, legal and social emancipation, passive suffrage and more property rights for widows with the 1973 Law 10 September, no. 29, "Equal rights for women".

Starting in 1972, the Committee began to evolve towards a more organised structure, and the UDS itself considers that year to be its founding year. The first directive council was formed in 1974 and obtained legal recognition from the Council of Twelves in October 1975.

The Union promoted the 1982 referendum to amend the citizenship law to repeal the provision whereby women lose their nationality when they marry a foreigner and the 1986 reformal of the family law to include measures proposed by the Union.

Between 1987 and 2019, the Union ceased to be active. On 14 September 2019, they announced the resumption of their activities on the initiative of Karen Pruccoli, whom was its president between 2020 and 2023. They presented the recovery and the new project on 17 September.

It was formally recognised as an association in 2020.

Under the leadership of Pruccoli, the UDS led the "Yes" campaign of the 2021 referendum that legalised the abortion. The referendum question was published on 15 March 2021, after the RETE Movement and the Union of Sammarinese Women collected enough signatures.

== Organizational structure ==
According to its statutes, the UDS is structured around an Executive Committee, which is the leadership, and a General Assembly of promoters.

In 2024 it was elected the new composition of the Executive Committee. In May 2025 Vanessa D’Ambrosio was replaced by Viola Bronzetti.

Since May 2025, the Executive Committee is composed by:

- President: Valentina Rossi
- Vicepresident: Elena D’Amelio
- Members: Karen Pruccoli, Viola Bronzetti, Laura Muratori
