= 1969 San Marino general election =

National election

- 7 September 1969
- All 60 seats in the Grand and General Council; 31 seats needed for a majority
- Turnout: 79.47% (▼4.52pp)
Party	Vote %	Seats	+/–
PDCS	44.02	27	−2
PCS	22.77	14	0
PSDIS	17.95	11	+1
PSS	11.91	7	+1
MLS	2.11	1	0
This lists parties that won seats. See the complete results below.
Secretary for Foreign Affairs before	Secretary for Foreign Affairs after election
Federico Bigi; PDCS	Federico Bigi; PDCS

General elections were held in San Marino on 7 September 1969. The Sammarinese Christian Democratic Party remained the largest party, winning 27 of the 60 seats in the Grand and General Council, and continued their coalition with the Independent Democratic Socialist Party, together holding 38 of the 60 seats. The Christian Democratic Party had flown in 400 supporters from the United States to vote for them.

== Electoral system ==
Voters had to be citizens of San Marino and at least 24 years old.

== Results ==
The new Communist Party (Marxist–Leninist) of San Marino failed to win a seat, the first time a party contesting a Sammarinese election had failed to gain parliamentary representation.

Party	Votes	%	Seats	+/–
Sammarinese Christian Democratic Party	5,708	44.02	27	–2
Sammarinese Communist Party	2,952	22.77	14	0
Sammarinese Independent Democratic Socialist Party	2,328	17.95	11	+1
Sammarinese Socialist Party	1,544	11.91	7	+1
Movement for Constitutional Freedoms	273	2.11	1	0
Communist Party (Marxist–Leninist) of San Marino	161	1.24	0	New
Total	12,966	100.00	60	0
Valid votes	12,966	97.58		
Invalid/blank votes	321	2.42		
Total votes	13,287	100.00		
Registered voters/turnout	16,720	79.47		
Source: Nohlen & Stöver
