= Democratic Movement (San Marino) =

Political party in San Marino

Democratic Movement (Italian: Movimento Democratico, MD) was a political party in San Marino.

== History ==
The party contested national elections for the first time in 1993, when it received 5.3% of the vote, winning two of the 60 seats in the Grand and General Council. In the 1998 elections it was succeeded by the Ideas in Motion party.
