= Communist Party (Marxist–Leninist) of San Marino =

Defunct political party in San Marino

Communist Party (Marxist–Leninist) of San Marino Partito Comunista (Marxista-Leninista) di San Marino
- Abbreviation: PCMLSM
- Founded: March 1968
- Dissolved: Post-1978
- Preceded by: MLMSM
- Ideology: Communism; Marxism-Leninism; Maoism (1968-1978); Hoxhaism; Anti-revisionism
- Political position: Far-left

The Communist Party (Marxist–Leninist) of San Marino (Italian: Partito Comunista (Marxista-Leninista) di San Marino) was an anti-revisionist, Maoist, communist party in San Marino.

The party was founded in March 1968 as the Marxist–Leninist Movement of San Marino (Italian: Movimento Marxista–Leninista di San Marino), by the dissidents of the San Marinese Communist Party. Group was led by Giuseppe Fabbri, who was a parliamentarian of the San Marinese Communist Party before splitting from it.

== International relations ==
Party was fraternal group with the Communist Party of Italy (Marxist–Leninist), and some of their messages-telegrams (congratulatory messages to the 9th National Congress of the Chinese Communist Party and China's 1969 National Day, condolences for the deaths of Zhou Enlai and Mao Zedong) were published in the Peking Review. With the Sino-Albanian split, following its Italian counterpart, party took the side of the Party of Labour of Albania, and participated in the actions to support it, such as the "Internationalist Rally" in Rome on April 17, 1977.

== Elections ==
The party participated in the parliamentary elections of 1969 (obtaining 161 votes, 1.24% of the votes), of 1974 (obtaining 121 votes, 0.88% of the votes) and of 1978 (obtaining 100 votes, 0.66% of the votes)—failing to win any seats in any of the elections it participated.

== See also ==
- List of anti-revisionist groups
