= Karen Pruccoli =

Entrepreneur and human rights activist

- Citizenship: San Marino
- Occupations: Entrepreneur; Human rights activist
- Employer: Fantastika
- Known for: President and restorer of the Union of Sammarinese Women

Karen Pruccoli is an entrepreneur and human rights activist from San Marino.

A restorer of the Union of Sammarinese Women, she was president of the organisation from 2020 to 2023. In 2021, during her presidency, San Marino legalised abortion, with Pruccoli leading the pro-choice 'Yes' campaign in the referendum. As an entrepreneur, Pruccoli founded a natural cosmetics company, Fantastika, which offers job opportunities mainly to women.

Pruccoli was succeeded as president of the Union of Sammarinese Women in 2024 by Valentina Rossi.
