= 1949 San Marino general election =

National election

- 27 February 1949
- All 60 seats in the Grand and General Council; 31 seats needed for a majority
- Turnout: 67.52% (▲10.11pp)
Party	Vote %	Seats	+/–
CdL	57.69	35	−5
AP	42.31	25	+5
This lists parties that won seats. See the complete results below.
Secretary for Foreign Affairs before	Secretary for Foreign Affairs after election
Gino Giacomini; PSS–CdL	Gino Giacomini; PSS–CdL

General elections were held in San Marino on 27 February 1949. The result was a victory for the Committee of Freedom, which won 35 of the 60 seats in the Grand and General Council.

== Electoral system ==
Voters had to be citizens of San Marino, male and at least 24 years old.

== Results ==
Party or alliance		Votes	%	Seats
Committee of Freedom	Sammarinese Communist Party	2,753	57.69	20
Committee of Freedom	Sammarinese Socialist Party	2,753	57.69	13
Committee of Freedom	Republican Democrats	2,753	57.69	2
Committee of Freedom	Total	2,753	57.69	35
Popular Alliance	Sammarinese Christian Democratic Party	2,019	42.31	14
Popular Alliance	Patriotic Independent Labour Association	2,019	42.31	6
Popular Alliance	Democratic Union	2,019	42.31	3
Popular Alliance	Independents	2,019	42.31	2
Popular Alliance	Total	2,019	42.31	25
Total		4,772	100.00	60
Valid votes		4,772	99.21	
Invalid/blank votes		38	0.79	
Total votes		4,810	100.00	
Registered voters/turnout		7,124	67.52	
Source: Nohlen & Stöver, Rossi
