= Alberto Giordano Spagni Reffi =

Sammarinese lawyer

Alberto Giordano Spagni Reffi (born 11 December 1992) is a Sammarinese lawyer and politician. A member of the RETE Movement, he is the grandson of Marina Busignani Reffi.

Spagni Reffi and Gloria Arcangeloni, a fellow member of the San Marino Parliament, were caught at a party during the COVID-19 pandemic, leading to them issuing a public apology. He gained his license to practice law in 2023.

Spagni Reffi supports the right to an abortion within San Marino.
