= Valentina Rossi =

Human rights activist from San Marino

- Citizenship: San Marino
- Occupation: Historian
- Known for: President of Union of Sammarinese Women

Valentina Rossi is a Sammarinese historian.

She was elected President of the Union of Sammarinese Women in 2024, succeeding Karen Pruccoli. Speaking on behalf of the Union in 2021 when abortion in San Marino was legalised after a referendum, Rossi described how the support for the yes vote showed "that the citizens are far beyond politics". She also curated a 2023 exhibition about women's voting practices in San Marino, held at the University of San Marino.
