= Party of Socialist Democracy =

Party of Socialist Democracy may refer to:

- Party of Socialist Democracy, a former name of the Socialists for Reform party in San Marino
- Parti de la Democratie Socialiste, a political party in Quebec
