= Democratic Convention =

Democratic Convention may refer to:

- Democratic Convention (France), a political party in France
- Democratic Convention (San Marino), a defunct political party in San Marino
- Democratic Convention of African Peoples, a political party in Togo
- Democratic Convention of Moldova, a defunct political alliance in Moldova
- Democratic National Convention, American Democratic Party presidential nominating events
