= Anna Maria Casali =

Sammarinese politician

Member of the Grand and General Council
- In office 1974–1978

Personal details
- Born: 1929 (age 96–97)

Anna Maria Casali (born 1929) is a Sammarinese former politician. She was one of four women elected to the Grand and General Council in 1974, becoming its first female members.

== Biography ==
Casali was born in 1929, the third child of Alvaro Casali, a dentist and politician. She grew up in Forlì in Italy and Toulouse in France, where her father had moved for work. She returned to San Marino and worked as a teacher.

A member of the Sammarinese Communist Party, Casali was elected to the Grand and General Council in the 1974 elections, becoming one of the first group of female MPs.
