= Committee of Freedom =

Political alliance in San Marino

The Committee of Freedom (Italian: Comitato della Libertà) was a political alliance in San Marino.

== History ==
The alliance was formed by the Sammarinese Socialist Party and the Sammarinese Communist Party, and was opposed by the Popular Alliance, an alliance of the Sammarinese Christian Democratic Party and the Sammarinese Democratic Socialist Party. It won 40 of the 60 seats in the Grand and General Council in the 1945 elections. The 1949 elections saw it reduced to 35 seats (20 for the PCS, 13 for the PSS and two for Republican Democrats). The alliance retained its combined majority in the 1951 elections, although won only 31 seats.

The alliance was formally abandoned for the 1955 elections. However, the parties continued to co-operate, with their coalition continuing to be known as the "Committee of Freedom". The parties remained in government until 1957, when six Socialist Party MPs left to merge with the Socialist Democratic Party to form the Sammarinese Independent Democratic Socialist Party.

Co-operation ceased briefly in March 1973 then the Socialists joined a government led by the Christian Democratic Party, but left in 1977 after the Christian Democrats refused to approve the Communists being given a role.
