= 1983 San Marino general election =

National election

- 29 May 1983
- All 60 seats in the Grand and General Council; 31 seats needed for a majority
- Turnout: 79.72% (▲0.74pp)
Party	Vote %	Seats	+/–
PDCS	42.07	26	0
PCS	24.38	15	−1
PSS	14.82	9	+1
PSU	13.89	8	+1
PSDS	2.90	1	−1
ID–PR	1.95	1	New
This lists parties that won seats. See the complete results below.
Secretary for Foreign Affairs before	Secretary for Foreign Affairs after election
Giordano Bruno Reffi; PDCS	Giordano Bruno Reffi; PDCS

General elections were held in San Marino on 29 May 1983. The Sammarinese Christian Democratic Party remained the largest party, winning 26 of the 60 seats in the Grand and General Council. Following the elections the Sammarinese Communist Party continued their coalition with the Sammarinese Socialist Party and the Unitary Socialist Party.

== Electoral system ==
Voters had to be citizens of San Marino and at least 18 years old. This was the first Sammarinese general election in which suffrage was granted to people under 24 years of age.

== Results ==
Party	Votes	%	Seats	+/–
Sammarinese Christian Democratic Party	7,068	42.07	26	0
Sammarinese Communist Party	4,096	24.38	15	–1
Sammarinese Socialist Party	2,490	14.82	9	+1
Unitary Socialist Party	2,333	13.89	8	+1
Sammarinese Socialist Democratic Party	487	2.90	1	–1
Democratic Consent–Republican Party	328	1.95	1	New
Total	16,802	100.00	60	0
Valid votes	16,802	97.63		
Invalid/blank votes	407	2.37		
Total votes	17,209	100.00		
Registered voters/turnout	21,588	79.72		
Source: Nohlen & Stöver
