= 1959 San Marino general election =

National election

- 13 September 1959
- All 60 seats in the Grand and General Council; 31 seats needed for a majority
- Turnout: 85.75% (▲15.68pp)
Party	Vote %	Seats	+/–
PDCS	44.26	27	+4
PCS	25.99	16	−3
PSDIS	15.94	9	+7
PSS	13.81	8	−8
This lists parties that won seats. See the complete results below.
Secretary for Foreign Affairs before	Secretary for Foreign Affairs after election
Federico Bigi; PDCS	Federico Bigi; PDCS

General elections were held in San Marino on 13 September 1959. The Sammarinese Christian Democratic Party remained the largest party, winning 27 of the 60 seats in the Grand and General Council, and formed a coalition with the Independent Democratic Socialist Party.

== Electoral system ==
Voters had to be citizens of San Marino, male and at least 24 years old.

== Results ==
Party	Votes	%	Seats	+/–
Sammarinese Christian Democratic Party	2,815	44.26	27	+4
Sammarinese Communist Party	1,653	25.99	16	–3
Sammarinese Independent Democratic Socialist Party	1,014	15.94	9	New
Sammarinese Socialist Party	878	13.81	8	–8
Total	6,360	100.00	60	0
Valid votes	6,360	98.71		
Invalid/blank votes	83	1.29		
Total votes	6,443	100.00		
Registered voters/turnout	7,514	85.75		
Source: Nohlen & Stöver
