= Unitary Socialist Party–Socialist Agreement =

The Unitary Socialist Party (Italian: Partito Socialista Unitario, PSU) was a political party in San Marino.

== History ==
The party was formed in 1975 when the Sammarinese Independent Democratic Socialist Party split into two; one faction forming the Unitary Socialist Party and the other forming Socialist Democracy. The PSU received 11% of the vote in the 1978 elections, winning seven seats. It subsequently joined the governing coalition alongside the Sammarinese Socialist Party (PSS) and the Sammarinese Communist Party (PCS).

PSU sent three delegates to the congress of the Socialist International in 1980; Pier Paolo Gasperoni, Emilio della Balda and Dominique Morolli. In the 1983 elections it won eight seats.

In 1988 the party entered into an alliance with Socialist Agreement (Intensa Socialista, IS). The alliance won eight seats again in the 1988 elections, emerging as the third-largest party. It subsequently merged into the PSS.

== See also ==
- Category:Unitary Socialist Party–Socialist Agreement politicians
