= 1988 San Marino general election =

National election

- 29 May 1988
- All 60 seats in the Grand and General Council; 31 seats needed for a majority
- Turnout: 81.12% (▲1.40pp)
Party	Vote %	Seats	+/–
PDCS	44.13	27	+1
PCS	28.69	18	+3
PSU–IS	13.64	8	0
PSS	11.11	7	−2
This lists parties that won seats. See the complete results below.
Secretary for Foreign Affairs before	Secretary for Foreign Affairs after election
Gabriele Gatti; PDCS	Gabriele Gatti; PDCS

General elections were held in San Marino on 29 May 1988. The Sammarinese Christian Democratic Party remained the largest party, winning 27 of the 60 seats in the Grand and General Council, and continued their coalition with the Sammarinese Communist Party.

== Electoral system ==
Voters had to be citizens of San Marino and at least 18 years old.

== Results ==
Party	Votes	%	Seats	+/–
Sammarinese Christian Democratic Party	9,001	44.13	27	+1
Sammarinese Communist Party	5,852	28.69	18	+3
Unitary Socialist Party–Socialist Agreement	2,781	13.64	8	0
Sammarinese Socialist Party	2,266	11.11	7	–2
Sammarinese Socialist Democratic Party	217	1.06	0	–1
Sammarinese Republican Party	279	1.37	0	New
Total	20,396	100.00	60	0
Valid votes	20,396	96.51		
Invalid/blank votes	737	3.49		
Total votes	21,133	100.00		
Registered voters/turnout	26,052	81.12		
Source: Nohlen & Stöver
