= 1978 San Marino general election =

National election

- 28 May 1978
- All 60 seats in the Grand and General Council; 31 seats needed for a majority
- Turnout: 78.98% (▼0.72pp)
Party	Leader	Vote %	Seats	+/–
PDCS		42.30	26	+1
PCS		25.14	16	+1
PSS		13.77	8	0
PSU		11.13	7	New
PDS		4.17	2	New
CDR	Bonelli Menetto	2.82	1	0
This lists parties that won seats. See the complete results below.
Secretary for Foreign Affairs before	Secretary for Foreign Affairs after election
Giancarlo Ghironzi; PDCS	Giordano Bruno Reffi; PDCS

General elections were held in San Marino on 28 May 1978. The Sammarinese Christian Democratic Party remained the largest party, winning 26 of the 60 seats in the Grand and General Council. Following the elections the Sammarinese Communist Party formed a coalition with the Sammarinese Socialist Party and the Unitary Socialist Party.

== Electoral system ==
Voters had to be citizens of San Marino and at least 24 years old.

== Results ==
Party	Votes	%	Seats	+/–
Sammarinese Christian Democratic Party	6,380	42.30	26	+1
Sammarinese Communist Party	3,791	25.14	16	+1
Sammarinese Socialist Party	2,077	13.77	8	0
Unitary Socialist Party	1,678	11.13	7	New
Party of Socialist Democracy	629	4.17	2	New
Committee for the Defence of the Republic	426	2.82	1	0
Communist Party (Marxist–Leninist) of San Marino	100	0.66	0	0
Total	15,081	100.00	60	0
Valid votes	15,081	97.35		
Invalid/blank votes	410	2.65		
Total votes	15,491	100.00		
Registered voters/turnout	19,615	78.98		
Source: Nohlen & Stöver
