= PSDS =

PSDS may refer to:

- Platform screen doors, used on public transit systems to separate platforms from tracks at stations
- PSDS Deli Serdang, a football club in Indonesia
- Sammarinese Democratic Socialist Party, a political party in San Marino
- Product safety data sheet (PSDS), document listing information relating to occupational safety and health for the use of various products

== See also ==
Platform screen doors (PSDs), safety systems on train station platforms
