= Unified Party of Haitian Communists =

Former political party in Haiti

Unified Party of Haitian Communists Parti unifié des communistes haïtiens
- Abbreviation: PUCH
- Standing Committee: Gérald Brisson; Raymond Jean Francois
- Founded: 1968
- Banned: 1969
- Headquarters: Port-au-Prince
- Ideology: Communism; Marxism–Leninism
- Political position: Far-left
- International affiliation: International Meeting of Communist and Workers' Parties

The Unified Party of Haitian Communists (French: Parti unifié des communistes haïtiens, abbreviated PUCH) was a political party in Haiti, founded in 1968.

== History ==
PUCH was established in 1968 through the merger of the Popular Entente Party (founded in 1959) and the Party of Union of Haitian Democrats (founded in 1954 and was until 1965 called the People's Party of National Liberation). The declaration of merger of the two parties stated: "PUCH is the conscious and organized vanguard of the working class, fighting under the banner of the Marxist–Leninist ideology. The path of the Haitian revolution, as defined in the documents of PUCH - is the path of armed struggle, which must be carried out in response to the reactionary violence". PUCH was a clandestine party from its foundation. The party initiated a lot of work for agrarian reform amongst the peasantry in the villages.

In 1969 the François Duvalier regime launched a crackdown on the party. Various urban and regional party organizations were dismantled. Hundreds of PUCH activists were jailed and tortured. The Central Committee secretaries Gérald Brisson and Raymond Jean Francois were killed, as were the members of the Port-au-Prince committee Jacques Jeannot and Adrien Sansarik. The party was however, able to rebuild illegal party organs and mass organizations. In June 1971 the party leadership put forward an action programme for unity of all progressive forces fighting against the Haitian regime. In the 1980s, the party leadership was exiled in France.

The PUCH sent a delegation to the 1969 International Meeting of Communist and Workers Parties held in Moscow. The party endorsed the documents adopted at the meeting.
