= 1951 San Marino general election =

National election

- 16 September 1951
- All 60 seats in the Grand and General Council; 31 seats needed for a majority
- Turnout: 62.55% (▼4.97pp)
Party	Vote %	Seats	+/–
PDCS (AP)	43.03	26	+1
PCS (CdL)	29.29	18	
PSS (CdL)	22.11	13	
PSDS (AP)	5.57	3	New
This lists parties that won seats. See the complete results below.
Secretary for Foreign Affairs before	Secretary for Foreign Affairs after election
Gino Giacomini; PSS–CdL	Gino Giacomini; PSS–CdL

General elections were held in San Marino on 16 September 1951. The Sammarinese Christian Democratic Party emerged as the largest single party, winning 26 of the 60 seats in the Grand and General Council. However, the Committee of Freedom alliance held a majority of 31 seats.

== Electoral system ==
Voters had to be citizens of San Marino, male and at least 24 years old.

== Results ==
Party or alliance		Votes	%	Seats
Committee of Freedom	Sammarinese Communist Party	1,305	29.29	18
Committee of Freedom	Sammarinese Socialist Party	985	22.11	13
Popular Alliance	Sammarinese Christian Democratic Party	1,917	43.03	26
Popular Alliance	Sammarinese Democratic Socialist Party	248	5.57	3
Total		4,455	100.00	60
Valid votes		4,455	97.55	
Invalid/blank votes		112	2.45	
Total votes		4,567	100.00	
Registered voters/turnout		7,301	62.55	
Source: Nohlen & Stöver
