= Democratic People's Party (San Marino) =

The Democratic People's Party (Italian: Partito Democratico Popolare, PDP) was a political party in San Marino.

== History ==
The party was established in 1974 as a one-MP breakaway from the Sammarinese Christian Democratic Party. In the general elections later that year it received 2% of the vote, winning one of the 60 seats in the Grand and General Council. However, it did not contest any further elections.
