= 1906 San Marino general election =

National election

- 10 June 1906
- All 60 seats in the Grand and General Council; 31 seats needed for a majority
- Turnout: 86.28% (▲31.78pp)
Party	Vote %	Seats
Independents	100%	60
This lists parties that won seats. See the complete results below.

General elections were held in San Marino on 10 June 1906.

== Electoral system ==
The electoral law to was passed on 5 May by the Council elected in March. All householders and graduates over 25 years of age could vote. The republic was divided in nine multi-member constituencies according to their population; the City of San Marino had 22 seats, Serravalle had 12 seats, Faetano had 6 seats, Acquaviva, Chiesanuova, Domagnano and Montegiardino had 4 seats, and Fiorentino and San Giovanni had 2 seats.

All councillors were elected in their constituency using a plurality-at-large voting.

== Results ==
Elected candidates belonged to the liberal group which had supported the democratic action of the citizenry meeting or were members of the sole organised party, the Sammarinese Socialist Party, which claimed to have won 29 seats. These two factions formed the first democratic government of the country.

Party	Votes	%	Seats
Independents	1,013	100.00	60
Total	1,013	100.00	60
Valid votes	1,013	97.59	
Invalid/blank votes	25	2.41	
Total votes	1,038	100.00	
Registered voters/turnout	1,203	86.28	
Source: Nohlen & Stöver
