= Ermenegildo Gasperoni =

Sammarinese politician

Ermenegildo "Gildo" Gasperoni (4 August 1906 – 26 June 1994) was a Sammarinese politician. He served as the general secretary and, later, chairman of the Sammarinese Communist Party.

== Early life ==
Gasperoni was the son of an artisan from San Marino. In his youth, he left the country in 1924. He joined the French Communist Party in 1926. He was an activist of the Communist Party of Luxembourg between 1930 and 1936. He joined the International Brigades during the Spanish Civil War, serving as political commissar of the Garibaldi Battalion in the Twelfth International Brigade. He later shifted to serve as the political commissar of the international centre for recruiting and training volunteers.

== Career ==
He returned to his homeland in 1940, beginning to work towards the foundation of the Sammarinese Communist Party. The Italian Communist Party had organized a local branch in San Marino in 1921, but the country did not have a communist party of its own. On 7 July 1941 the Sammarinese Communist Party was founded under Gasperoni's leadership. As of 1949, he was the Minister of Transport in the communist-socialist coalition government. Apart from his political labours, he also worked as an auto mechanic in Borgo Maggiore at this time.

Gasperoni represented the Sammarinese Communist Party at different international events, such as the 1969 International Meeting of Communist and Workers Parties in Moscow and the 1976 Conference of Communist and Workers Parties of Europe in Berlin. At both of these events Gasperoni voiced criticisms against the policies of the Communist Party of the Soviet Union.

In 1978, Gasperoni was elected to serve a six-month term as one of the two Captains Regent (i.e., co-heads of state of San Marino), along with the socialist Adriano Reffi. With Gasperoni San Marino had a communist head of state for the first time in two decades.

During a visit to the Soviet Union in January 1983, Gasperoni and the Sammarinese Communist Party general secretary Umberto Barulli were decorated with the Order of Friendship of Peoples at a ceremony in the Kremlin. As of the 1980s, Gasperoni had been named honorary chairman of the Sammarinese Communist Party.
