= Umberto Barulli =

Sammarinese politician

Umberto Barulli (1921 – 1993) was a Sammarinese politician. A leader of the Sammarinese Communist Party, Barulli served as head of state of San Marino in 1988.

Prior to his political career, Barulli worked at the Ansaldo factory in Genoa, Italy. Barulli was the general secretary of the Sammarinese Communist Party between 1973 and 1984. Prior to his appointment as party general secretary, he served as deputy general secretary. As a leader of the Communist Party, Barulli advocated for Sammarinese economic self-sufficiency, arguing that dependency on tourism would be reduced whilst industries and agricultural sectors would be developed. In a 1978 interview, he said that San Marino ought to stop 'living as a parasite on Italy'.

Barulli represented the Sammarinese Communist Party at different international events. He represented the Sammarinese communists as a guest of honour at the tenth anniversary jubilee celebrations of the People's Republic of China in 1959. Barulli visited the 25th Congress of the Communist Party of the Soviet Union in 1976, and gave a speech at the event. During a visit to the Soviet Union in January 1983, Barulli and the Sammarinese Communist Party chairman Ermenegildo Gasperoni were awarded with the Order of Friendship of Peoples at a ceremony in the Kremlin.

Barulli served as one of the two Captains Regent (i.e. the head of state of San Marino) for one term between April and September 1988, along with Rosolino Martelli. At the time the country was governed by a coalition between the Communist Party and the Christian Democrats.
