= Erich Ziegler =

German politician and resistance activist

Erich Ziegler (29 February 1914 – 6 May 2004) was a German politician and resistance activist. He was active in the "Heinz Kapelle Group" during the 1930s. After the war, Ziegler was a leader of the Socialist Unity Party of West Berlin (SEW).

== Early years ==
Ziegler was born in Neukölln in 1914 and grew up in a working class family. After finishing Volksschule schooling, he became a bakers' apprentice. In 1929 he witnessed clashes between police and demonstrators on May Day in Neukölln. He joined the Young Communist League of Germany in the same year. His wife, Elli (née Fuchs), was an activist of the Socialist Workers Youth (the youth wing of the SPD).

== Resistance struggle ==
Erich and Elli Ziegler continued their political activities after the National Socialist take-over in 1933. Erich Ziegler was fired from his job. In autumn 1934 the Zieglers opened two bookshops, that functioned as centres of distribution of underground anti-fascist propaganda. To make ends meet, Erich Ziegler also worked delivering newspapers during these years. In 1936 he was drafted to the Wehrmacht.

As the Second World War drew closer, Erich Ziegler and Heinz Kapelle built up a resistance group in Berlin. The group encompassed activists from the Young Communist League, the Socialist Workers Youth and Catholic youth groups. Once the war broke out in 1939, the group to which the Zieglers belonged began distributing anti-war propaganda in Berlin, calling for the overthrow of Adolf Hitler and demanding an end to hostilities with neighbouring countries.

Between 15 and 17 October 1939 the state authorities conducted a crack-down on the resistance activists in Berlin. The group that Ziegler belonged to was broken up. Erich and Elli Ziegler were arrested on 17 October 1939. They endured months in Gestapo captivity before their trial in February 1941. Ziegler was held at the Moabit prison. At their trial Heinz Kapelle was sentenced to death and Erich Ziegler to life imprisonment. Elli Ziegler was sentenced to three years imprisonment, other defendants were sentenced to prison terms ranging from one to ten years.

== Post-war years ==
After Liberation, he founded the Anti-Fascist Youth Committee of Berlin-Neukölln. During this period Ziegler worked closely with the youth secretary of the Communist Party, Erich Honecker. They enjoyed cordial relations with young social democrats, with whom they shared experiences from the resistance struggle. Ziegler took part in the construction of the Free German Youth and the Democratic Sports Movement of Greater Berlin.

Between 1950 and 1954 Ziegler served as First Secretary of the Tempelhof branch of the Socialist Unity Party of Germany (SED), and between 1954 and 1959 as the First Secretary of SED in Wedding. In 1959 he was included in the West Berlin Leadership of SED (Westberliner Leitung der SED), as its Second Secretary.

== SEW leader ==
When the Socialist Unity Party of Germany-West Berlin (later renamed the Socialist Unity Party of West Berlin, SEW) was founded as an independent party in 1962, Ziegler was named Second Secretary of the Presidium of the party. Between May 1967 and April 1977 he served as Vice Chairman of the party. Ziegler led the SEW delegation at the 1976 Conference of Communist and Workers Parties of Europe, held in East Berlin.

After withdrawing from full-time politics Ziegler would continue some political activities, giving lectures to youth movements about his experiences of the underground struggle against the Hitler regime. At the time of his death in 2004, he was the last survivor of the Heinz Kapelle group.
