= 1945 San Marino general election =

National election

- 11 March 1945
- All 60 seats in the Grand and General Council; 31 seats needed for a majority
- Turnout: 57.41% (▲3.14pp)
| Party | Vote % | Seats | +/– |
|---|---|---|---|
| CdL | 65.97 | 40 | −20 |
| AP | 34.03 | 20 | New |
This lists parties that won seats. See the complete results below.
| Secretary for Foreign Affairs before | Secretary for Foreign Affairs after election |
|---|---|
| Gustavo Babboni; PCS–CdL | Gino Giacomini; PSS–CdL |

General elections were held in San Marino on 11 March 1945. The British Army had required a fresh election for the final elimination of all fascist-friendly politicians. The result was a victory for the Committee of Freedom, which won 40 of the 60 seats in the Grand and General Council.

== Electoral system ==
Voters had to be citizens of San Marino, male and at least 24 years old.

== Results ==
| Party | Votes | % | Seats |
|---|---|---|---|
| Committee of Freedom | 2,214 | 65.97 | 40 |
| Popular Alliance | 1,142 | 34.03 | 20 |
| Total | 3,356 | 100.00 | 60 |
| Valid votes | 3,326 | 99.11 | |
| Invalid/blank votes | 30 | 0.89 | |
| Total votes | 3,356 | 100.00 | |
| Registered voters/turnout | 5,846 | 57.41 | |
Source: Nohlen & Stöver
