= Abortion in San Marino =

Abortion in San Marino is legal in the first 12 weeks of gestation for any reason. It is also legal until fetal viability if the pregnancy poses a risk to the woman's life, if the fetus has an anomaly that poses a risk to the woman's health, or if the pregnancy is the result of rape or incest. In case of risk to the woman's life after fetal viability, the pregnancy may also be interrupted by attempting a live birth.

== History ==
Before 2022, articles 153 and 154 of the Penal Code of San Marino imposed a prison sentence for any woman who procured an abortion, any person who helped her, and any person who performed the abortion. Although the law did not explicitly mention any exception, abortions performed to save the woman's life were generally permitted by the legal principle of necessity.

A proposal to liberalize abortion law was submitted during 1974 revisions to the Penal Code, but the government deferred it indefinitely to permit further debate. After neighboring Italy legalized abortion in 1978, women from San Marino could seek an abortion by crossing the border.

In September 2021, a referendum resulted in 77.3% in favor of allowing for the voluntary termination of pregnancy up to the 12th week of gestation, and also thereafter if the pregnancy posed a risk to the woman's life or health, or if the pregnancy resulted from rape or incest. The referendum did not immediately legalize abortion, but required the parliament to make the relevant changes to the law. On 31 August 2022, the parliament approved the law, with 32 votes in favour, 7 against, and 10 abstentions. The law was published in the government gazette on 7 September 2022, and entered into force on 12 September 2022.

== See also ==
- 2021 Sammarinese referendum
- Abortion in Italy
