= Gloria Arcangeloni =

Sammarinese politician

Gloria Arcangeloni (born 7 February 1978) is a Sammarinese politician who is the current leader of the left-wing RETE Movement. She is most known for leading the effort in San Marino to legalize medicinal marijuana.

Arcangeloni and Alberto Giordano Spagni Reffi, a fellow member of the San Marino Parliament, were caught at a party during the COVID-19 pandemic, leading to them issuing a public apology.
