= Movement for Constitutional Freedoms =

Movement for Constitutional Freedoms Movimento per le Libertà Statutarie
- Founded: 1964
- Dissolved: 1978
- Ideology: Liberalism; Radicalism
- Political position: Centre-left
- Italian counterpart: Radical Party

The Movement for Constitutional Freedoms (Italian: Movimento per le Libertà Statutarie, MLS) was a liberal political party in San Marino.

It was launched in 1964 by Leo Dominicini and Renzo Bonelli, and its main goals were to defend civil liberties and to reinforce constitutional checks and balances. Influenced by the Italian Radical Party, MLS strongly supported the extensive use of referendum.

MLS took part in the elections of 1964, 1969 and 1974, winning one seat in each election and never obtaining more than 3% of the vote.

Between 1973 and 1974, MLS was part of the government coalition with the Christian Democrats and the Socialists. The party played a role in getting the Declaration of Citizen Rights to be adopted in July 1974. Dominicini died in 1974 and the party was disbanded by 1978.
