= 1998 San Marino general election =

National election

- 31 May 1998
- All 60 seats in the Grand and General Council; 31 seats needed for a majority
- Turnout: 75.28% (▼4.75pp)
| Party | Leader | Vote % | Seats | +/– |
|---|---|---|---|---|
| PDCS | | 40.85 | 25 | −1 |
| PSS | | 23.23 | 14 | 0 |
| PPDS–IM–CD | Maurizio Tomassoni | 18.64 | 11 | 0 |
| APDSplR | Luciano Sansovini | 9.81 | 6 | +2 |
| SR | | 4.19 | 2 | New |
| RCS | Ivan Foschi | 3.27 | 2 | 0 |
This lists parties that won seats. See the complete results below.
| Secretary for Foreign Affairs before | Secretary for Foreign Affairs after election |
|---|---|
| Gabriele Gatti; PDCS | Gabriele Gatti; PDCS |

General elections were held in San Marino on 31 May 1998. The Sammarinese Christian Democratic Party remained the largest party, winning 25 of the 60 seats in the Grand and General Council, and continued their coalition with the Sammarinese Socialist Party.

== Electoral system ==
Voters had to be citizens of San Marino and at least 18 years old.

== Results ==
| Party | Votes | % | Seats | +/– |
|---|---|---|---|---|
| Sammarinese Christian Democratic Party | 8,907 | 40.85 | 25 | –1 |
| Sammarinese Socialist Party | 5,064 | 23.23 | 14 | 0 |
| Sammarinese Democratic Progressive Party–Ideas in Motion–Democratic Convention | 4,065 | 18.64 | 11 | 0 |
| Popular Alliance of Sammarinese Democrats for the Republic | 2,139 | 9.81 | 6 | +2 |
| Socialists for Reform | 914 | 4.19 | 2 | New |
| Sammarinese Communist Refoundation | 714 | 3.27 | 2 | 0 |
| Total | 21,803 | 100.00 | 60 | 0 |
| Valid votes | 21,803 | 96.16 | | |
| Invalid/blank votes | 870 | 3.84 | | |
| Total votes | 22,673 | 100.00 | | |
| Registered voters/turnout | 30,117 | 75.28 | | |
Source: Nohlen & Stöver
