= Barbara Bollini =

Sammarinese politician (born 1968)

Member of the Great and General Council
- Incumbent
- Assumed office July 2024

Mayor of Borgo Maggiore
- In office 2020–2024
- Succeeded by: Sergio Nanni

Personal details
- Born: April 7, 1968 (age 58) San Marino
- Party: Sammarinese Christian Democratic Party
- Occupation: Politician

Barbara Bollini (born 7 April 1968) is a Sammarinese politician. She has been member of the Grand and General Council since 2024 and mayor of Borgo Maggiore between 2020 and 2024.

== Career ==
Bollini was born on 7 April 1968 in San Marino. She studied hotel and commercial management.

She is member of the Sammarinese Christian Democratic Party (PDCS).

In the 2020 local elections Bollini was elected mayor (Capitano di Castello) of Borgo Maggiore with the list Tutti insieme una grande famiglia, which ran unopposed in the castle. In May 2023, she introduced a ceremony marking the donation of an olive tree to San Marino by the Ukrainian community, an event that also highlighted the country's reception of people displaced by the war in Ukraine.

Bollini became member of the Grand and General Council in July 2024 for PDCS following the replacement of councillors who had been appointed to the Sammarinese government. She subsequently resigned as mayor of Borgo Maggiore and was succeeded by Sergio Nanni in August 2023. In parliamentary committee discussions in March 2025, she addressed the safety and future organisation of school buildings, emphasising the need to protect children while assessing the circumstances of schools in smaller villages.
