= Marino Capicchioni =

Italo-Sammarinese luthier (1895-1977)

Marino Capicchioni (28 June 1895 – 19 October 1977) was an Italo-Sammarinese musical instrument maker. Long based in Rimini, his instruments have been played by Salvatore Accardo, David Oistrach, Mstislav Rostropovich and Yehudi Menuhin, among others.

== Biography ==
Capicchioni was born in Santa Mustiola in the Republic of San Marino on 28 June 1895. At an early age, he began working as a local carpenter, as a cooper, as well as a woodcarver and furniture maker. He later developed an interest in instrument making and constructed several guitars. He completed his first violin when he was 24.

In 1929, he permanently established himself in Rimini, where he opened his own workshop. He participated in numerous exhibitions and competitions all over Italy and was praised and recognized for his talent: in 1931, he won the gold medal at the Padua Exposition, and in 1937, he received an honourable mention and third prize for his quartet exhibited at the National Violin Making Exhibition and Competition in Cremona during the Stradivari Bicentenary.

The Vannes Universal Dictionary of Violinmakers quotes that in 1948, Capicchioni had already made 350 violins, 10 violas, and 20 violoncellos.

In the middle of the 1940s, his son Mario began working with him and shared in his business until the Master's death.

The Republic of San Marino dedicated a square to Marino Capicchioni and erected a monument by the sculptor Marina Busignani Reffi in his honour.

== Analysis of Capicchioni's work ==
An overall analysis of Capicchioni's work shows two distinct periods: one from the 1920s to the 1930s and the second "golden period" beginning in the 1940s, the era which brought him fame.

His work of the 1920s and 1930s is distinguished by his continued research for technical and stylistic solutions: the workmanship is good but his distinct personality does not emerge. Although he was inspired by the classical models of Stradivari and Guarneri.

In the golden period, the master succeeded in giving a personal influence to his work, a quality which can be recognized almost unmistakably. He always used material of excellent quality, and to accentuate the flame of the maple, he developed a special technique for treating the instrument "in the white". When he varnished his instruments, he attempted to age them slightly by accentuating the grain of the spruce on the belly. The varnish used was generally a golden yellow, but one can also find instruments with lively red colouring. Capicchioni's work was already quite popular in the early 1960s, and his instruments are still sought after today for their excellent sound. He died in Rimini, aged 82.

One of his quartets is on permanent display at the Stradivari Museum of Cremona.

== Some musicians that have owned Capicchioni instruments ==
in alphabetical order:

- Alberto Sanna violin of 1927
- Alessandra Sonia Romano violin of 1951
- Alessandro Moccia violin of 1941
- Alfredo Cicoria cello of 1963
- Andrea Castagna violin of 1938
- Anna Maria Cotogni violin of 1955
- Antonio De Lorenzi violin of 1943
- Arrigo Serato violin of 1946
- Carlo Fabiano violin of 1955
- Christian Joseph Saccon violin of 1953
- Clara Fuchs viola of 1963
- David Oistrach violin of 1962
- Duilio Galfetti violin of 1949
- Elisa Pegreffi two violins of 1942 and 1943
- Fabrizio Zoffoli violin of 1962
- Felix Ayo violin of 1956
- Florence Ohlberg viola of 1950
- Franco Gulli violin of 1946
- Franco Rossi cello of 1953
- Giuliano Carmignola violin of 1947
- Giuseppe Laffranchini cello of 1952
- John McCarthy viola of 1950
- Luca Fanfoni violin of 1955
- Luciano Capicchioni violin of 1974
- Luigi Alberto Bianchi violin of 1952 and a viola of 1965
- Luigi Sagrati viola of ca. 1960
- Marcel Tufigno violin of 1966
- Marianne Chen cello of 1946
- Massimo Paris viola of 1959
- Mstislav Rostropovich
- Nazareno Cicoria cello of 1963
- Paolo Borciani two violins of 1942 and 1943
- Pierluigi Capicchioni violin of 1974
- Piero Farulli viola of 1944
- Pina Carmirelli three violins of 1941,1954 and 1956
- Roberto Tarenzi violin of 1944
- Rodolfo Bonucci violin of 1939
- Salvatore Accardo violin of 1942
- Szymon Krzeszowiec violin of 1942
- Vincenzo Schembri viola of 1953
- Walter Zagato violin of 1963
- Wim Janssen viola of 1952
- Yehudi Menuhin violin of 1961
