= 1955 San Marino general election =

National election

- 14 August 1955
- All 60 seats in the Grand and General Council; 31 seats needed for a majority
- Turnout: 70.07% (▲7.52pp)
Party	Vote %	Seats	+/–
PDCS	38.25	23	−3
PCS	31.57	19	+1
PSS	25.51	16	+3
PSDS	4.67	2	−1
This lists parties that won seats. See the complete results below.
Secretary for Foreign Affairs before	Secretary for Foreign Affairs after election
Gino Giacomini; PSS–CdL	Gino Giacomini; PSS–CdL

General elections were held in San Marino on 14 August 1955. Although the Sammarinese Christian Democratic Party remained the largest party, winning 23 of the 60 seats in the Grand and General Council, the alliance of the Sammarinese Communist Party and Sammarinese Socialist Party retained its majority.

== Electoral system ==
Voters had to be citizens of San Marino, male and at least 24 years old.

== Results ==
Party	Votes	%	Seats	+/–
Sammarinese Christian Democratic Party	2,006	38.25	23	–3
Sammarinese Communist Party	1,656	31.57	19	+1
Sammarinese Socialist Party	1,338	25.51	16	+3
Sammarinese Democratic Socialist Party	245	4.67	2	–1
Total	5,245	100.00	60	0
Valid votes	5,245	97.80		
Invalid/blank votes	118	2.20		
Total votes	5,363	100.00		
Registered voters/turnout	7,654	70.07		
Source: Nohlen & Stöver
