= Marina Busignani Reffi =

Sammarinese painter, ceramist and politician

- Born: 1930; San Marino
- Died: 2006 (aged 75–76)
- Education: Accademia di Belle Arti di Bologna

Marina Busignani Reffi (1930–2006) was a Sammarinese painter, sculptor, ceramist, and politician.

Born in the city of San Marino, Reffi studied art at the Accademia di Belle Arti di Bologna, where her instructors included Giorgio Morandi, Virgilio Guidi, and Luciano Minguzzi. From 1956 until 1989 she was active at the Sammarinese ceramic manufacturer SAM. She was among the artists who founded the association for Sammarinese artists in 1976, and served as its president in 1978. At the Venice Biennale, she served as a commissioner, and was the first to represent her home country at the event. She represented San Marino at exhibits elsewhere during her career as well. Reffi was also active in politics, becoming the first woman to join the Sammarinese Socialist Party. She was also one of the first three women to be elected to the Grand and General Council in 1974, alongside Clara Boscaglia and Fausta Morganti. She declined, however, to take her seat, deferring instead to her husband, Giordano Bruno Reffi, who had been elected on the same list. She also served as capitano di castello of the city of San Marino. Reffi died in the city of her birth in 2006, and was buried in the cemetery of Chiesanuova.

Reffi was active in Italian cultural circles throughout her life, and counted among her friends the artist Emilio Vedova. Her 1981 monument in stone to the luthier Marino Capicchioni may be seen in the Old City of San Marino, where it is displayed as part of the Open Air Museum; other works on view in the town include History of Science (1963, cement) and the undated Testimony 1 and Testimony 2, both in stone.
