= Jakob Lechleiter =

Swiss politician (1911–1994)

Jakob Lechleiter (19 November 1911 – 2 February 1994) was a Swiss politician.

Jakob Lechleiter was born as Jakob Lüthi on 19 November 1911 in Chur. His father was a railway worker. He moved to Zurich in 1921 together with his mother, following his father's death. He worked as a delivery apprentice. He spent some time in Basel too. Jakob Lüthi joined the Young Communist League of Switzerland in 1929. In the following year his mother married the German communist parliamentarian Georg Lechleiter, and Jakob and his mother moved to Germany. Jakob adopted his stepfather's family name (his stepfather was executed in 1942). In the communist movement, Jakob's nom de guerre was Tomi.

In 1933 he was expelled from Germany. He travelled back to Switzerland along with an Alsatian woman, Rosel Iltis, whom he married two years later. Early in 1934 Lechleiter clandestinely re-entered Germany for two months. He also travelled to Moscow, where he obtained political training.

Lechleiter became the secretary of the Young Communist League of Switzerland in 1934, a position he held until 1937. He did however come into conflict with the party leader Jules Humbert-Droz.

Lechleiter served as the Zurich canton secretary of the Swiss Party of Labour between 1945 and 1956, and as national secretary of the party between 1966 and 1978 (as part of a triumvirate along with Jean Vincent and André Muret). Lechleiter represented the party at different international events, such as the 1969 International Meeting of Communist and Workers Parties in Moscow and the 1976 Conference of Communist and Workers Parties of Europe in East Berlin.

Lechleiter died on 2 February 1994, at the age of 82.
