= Committee for the Defence of the Republic =

Former far-right political party of San Marino

The Committee for the Defence of the Republic (Italian: Comitato Difesa Repubblica, CDR) was a far-right political party in San Marino led by Bonelli Menetto.

== History ==
The party was established in March 1974. In the 1974 general elections it received 3% of the vote and won a single seat in the Grand and General Council. In the 1978 elections its vote share dropped to 2.8%, but the party retained its one seat. However, it did not contest any further elections.
