= 2005 San Marino electoral law referendum =

A referendum on the electoral law was held in San Marino on 3 July 2005. Voters were asked four questions on changes to the electoral law and electoral system. Although all four were approved by a majority of those voting, voter turnout was just 21.7%, meaning that the quorum of 32% of registered voters (10,143) was not achieved for any question. This resulted in all four questions failing, including two that proposed raising the quorum to 40%.

== Results ==
=== Question I ===
Do you want that, in the event of political elections, voters can express their preference for up to two candidates on the list they have chosen?

| Choice | Votes | % |
|---|---|---|
| For | 5,027 | 75.9 |
| Against | 1,599 | 24.1 |
| Invalid/blank votes | 254 | – |
| Total | 6,880 | 100 |
| Registered voters/turnout | 31,695 | 21.7 |
Source: Nohlen & Stöver

=== Question II ===
Do you want that a part of the members of the State Congress, even when they are nominated for the Grand and General Council, can be elected from the outside (i.e. not being members) of the same council?

| Choice | Votes | % |
|---|---|---|
| For | 4,396 | 66.6 |
| Against | 2,209 | 33.4 |
| Invalid/blank votes | 274 | – |
| Total | 6,879 | 100 |
| Registered voters/turnout | 31,695 | 21.7 |
Source: Nohlen & Stöver

=== Question III ===
Do you want a revision of the second paragraph of article 24 of law no. 101 of 28 November 1994 "New norms regarding referendums and popular initiatives" pursuant to the following wording: "The proposition underlying a propositive referendum is approved, if it obtains the majority of valid votes and quorum of no less than 40% of the registered voters?

| Choice | Votes | % |
|---|---|---|
| For | 4,762 | 72.8 |
| Against | 1,776 | 27.2 |
| Invalid/blank votes | 335 | – |
| Total | 6,873 | 100 |
| Registered voters/turnout | 31,695 | 21.7 |
Source: Nohlen & Stöver

=== Question IV ===
Do you want a revision of the second paragraph of article 31 of law no. 101 of 28 November 1994 "New norms regarding referendums and popular initiatives" pursuant to the following wording: "The proposition underlying a confirmative referendum is approved, if it obtains the majority of valid votes and quorum of no less than 40% of registered voters?

| Choice | Votes | % |
|---|---|---|
| For | 4,796 | 73.2 |
| Against | 1,759 | 26.8 |
| Invalid/blank votes | 317 | – |
| Total | 6,872 | 100 |
| Registered voters/turnout | 31,695 | 21.7 |
Source: Nohlen & Stöver
