= 1906 San Marino Constitutional Assembly election =

National election

- 25 March 1906
- Turnout: 54.50%
	Majority party
Party	Independents
Popular vote	802
Percentage	100%

Grand and General Council elections were held in San Marino on 25 March 1906.

The Arengo was reconstituted on 25 March, meeting in the Basilica del Santo Marino, and restored its own power to elect the Grand and General Council. It then elected a new Council, with the elected members setting out the conditions for general elections later in the year.

== Results ==
Party	Votes	%
Independents	802	100.00
Total	802	100.00
Valid votes	802	99.63
Invalid/blank votes	3	0.37
Total votes	805	100.00
Registered voters/turnout	1,477	54.50
Source: Nohlen & Stöver
