= 1993 San Marino general election =

National election

- 13 May 1993
- All 60 seats in the Grand and General Council; 31 seats needed for a majority
- Turnout: 80.03% (▼1.09pp)
Party	Leader	Vote %	Seats	+/–
PDCS		41.37	26	−1
PSS		23.73	14	+7
PPDS	Maurizio Tomassoni	18.58	11	New
APDSplR	Luciano Sansovini	7.70	4	New
MD		5.27	3	New
RCS	Giuseppe Amici	3.36	2	New
This lists parties that won seats. See the complete results below.
Secretary for Foreign Affairs before	Secretary for Foreign Affairs after election
Gabriele Gatti; PDCS	Gabriele Gatti; PDCS

General elections were held in San Marino on 13 May 1993. The Sammarinese Christian Democratic Party remained the largest party, winning 26 of the 60 seats in the Grand and General Council, and continued their coalition with the Sammarinese Socialist Party.

== Electoral system ==
Voters had to be citizens of San Marino and at least 18 years old.

== Results ==
Party	Votes	%	Seats	+/–
Sammarinese Christian Democratic Party	9,010	41.37	26	–1
Sammarinese Socialist Party	5,167	23.73	14	+7
Sammarinese Democratic Progressive Party	4,046	18.58	11	New
Popular Alliance of Sammarinese Democrats for the Republic	1,676	7.70	4	New
Democratic Movement	1,148	5.27	3	New
Sammarinese Communist Refoundation	731	3.36	2	New
Total	21,778	100.00	60	0
Valid votes	21,778	96.21		
Invalid/blank votes	859	3.79		
Total votes	22,637	100.00		
Registered voters/turnout	28,285	80.03		
Source: Nohlen & Stöver
