= 1996 San Marino electoral law referendum =

A referendum on the electoral law was held in San Marino on 22 September 1996. Voters were asked four questions on changes to the electoral law and electoral system, all of which were approved by voters.

== Results ==
=== Question I ===
Do you want to abolish Article 6 of law no. 6 of 31 January 1996, the "Electoral Law", which provides for travel into and out of the country for voters of elections to the Grand and General Council at the expense of the state?

Choice	Votes	%
For	11,441	60.5
Against	7,456	39.5
Invalid/blank votes	360	–
Total	19,257	100
Registered voters/turnout	29,729	64.8
Source: Nohlen & Stöver

=== Question II ===
Do you want that a voter can express a preference for up to three candidates of the list he has chosen?

Choice	Votes	%
For	11,811	62.8
Against	7,000	37.2
Invalid/blank votes	437	–
Total	19,248	100
Registered voters/turnout	29,729	64.7
Source: Nohlen & Stöver

=== Question III ===
Do you want a voter to be able to express a preference for a maximum of three candidates in the list he has chosen?

Choice	Votes	%
For	12,219	65.0
Against	6,571	35.0
Invalid/blank votes	457	–
Total	19,247	100
Registered voters/turnout	29,729	64.7
Source: Nohlen & Stöver

=== Question IV ===
Should it be forbidden for organisations and single persons to compensate or subsidise the travel and stay of voters during an election, and do you want harsher punishments to be introduced for those that break this law?

Choice	Votes	%
For	11,322	60.9
Against	7,257	39.1
Invalid/blank votes	669	–
Total	19,248	100
Registered voters/turnout	29,729	64.7
Source: Nohlen & Stöver
