= Gilberto Vieira =

Colombian politician (1911–2000)

Gilberto Vieira White
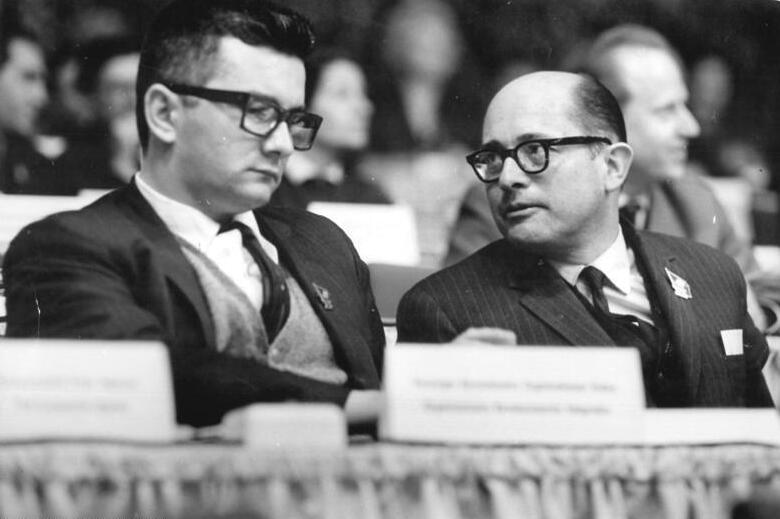
- Gilberto Vieira (right) and Dr. Armando Hart (left) at the 6th congress of the Socialist Unity Party of Germany, 1963.

Member of the Chamber of Representatives of Colombia
- Constituency: Cundinamarca Department

Personal details
- Born: April 5, 1911 Medellín, Antioquia, Colombia
- Died: February 25, 2000 (aged 88) Bogotá, D.C., Colombia
- Party: Communist
- Spouse: Cecilia Quijano Caballero
- Children: Joaquín Vieira Quijano; Constanza Vieira Quijano

Gilberto Vieira White (5 April 1911, Medellín - 25 February 2000) was a Colombian politician. He was a founder of the Colombian Communist Party, and served as the General Secretary of the party between 1947 and 1991. He was also a parliamentarian for a period.

== Personal life ==
Gilberto Vieira was born on 5 April 1911 in Medellín, Antioquia, the only son of Joaquín Vieira Gaviria and Mercedes White Uribe
