= 2020 San Marino local elections =

Local elections held on 29 November 2020 in San Marino

The 2020 San Marino local elections were held on 29 November, to elect the mayors and the councils of the 9 municipalities of San Marino. These elections were initially scheduled to take place on 15 December 2019, but were postponed to 21 June 2020 due to a snap general election called for 8 December. Due to the COVID-19 pandemic, elections were postponed once again to 29 November 2020.

In September 2020, the Grand and General Council approved the passive suffrage for foreigners having resided in San Marino for a period of at least 10 years, as well a reduction of seats in the municipal councils.

== Election system ==
Active and passive suffrage was entitled to resident Sammarineses over 18 years old, as well as foreigners having resided in San Marino for at least 10 years. Voters elected the mayor (Italian: capitano di castello) and the municipal council (giunta di castello). The number of councillors is defined according to the population:

Population	Councillors	Municipalities
< 2,500	6	Acquaviva, Chiesanuova, Faetano, Montegiardino
≥ 2,500	8	Borgo Maggiore, City of San Marino, Domagnano, Fiorentino, Serravalle
Source: Legge 24 settembre 2020 n.158

Candidates for the municipal councils ran on lists led by a mayoral candidate. Voters elected a list and were allowed to give up to two preferential votes. Seats were allocated with the d'Hondt method if the winner had obtained at least 62.5% of the votes. Otherwise, five seats would have been allocated to the winning party (four seats if the council had six members) and the rest of the seats would have been allocated using the d'Hondt method to the rest of the parties. The mayoral candidate of the winning list was proclaimed mayor.

In case of a tie for the first position, a second round would have taken place between the two mayoral candidates. In case of a tie in the second round, the youngest candidate would be elected. In the municipalities where only one list contested the election, the election was considered valid if the turnout was over 35%.

== Results ==
Overall turnout was 41.1%, 4.7pp lower than in 2014. The highest turnout was recorded in the smallest municipalities: Chiesanuova and Montegiardino.

=== Acquaviva ===
List	Mayoral candidate	Votes	%	Seats
Noi per Acquaviva	Enzo Semprini	621	100.00	6
Total		621	100.00	6
Valid votes		621	90.79	
Invalid/blank votes		63	9.21	
Total votes		684	100.00	
Registered voters/turnout		1,615	42.35	

=== Borgo Maggiore ===
List	Mayoral candidate	Votes	%	Seats
Tutti Insieme una Gran Famiglia	Barbara Bollini	1,873	100.00	8
Total		1,873	100.00	8
Valid votes		1,873	95.12	
Invalid/blank votes		96	4.88	
Total votes		1,969	100.00	
Registered voters/turnout		5,248	37.52	

=== Chiesanuova ===
List	Mayoral candidate	Votes	%	Seats
Chiesanuova Avanti	Marino Rosti	298	59.01	4
Viviamo Chiesanuova	Fabio Mazza	207	40.99	2
Total		505	100.00	6
Valid votes		505	98.83	
Invalid/blank votes		6	1.17	
Total votes		511	100.00	
Registered voters/turnout		885	57.74	

=== City of San Marino ===
List	Mayoral candidate	Votes	%	Seats
Uniamo San Marino	Tommaso Rossini	575	43.76	5
Città che riparte	Daniele Volpini	470	35.77	2
Uniamocittà	Simona Capicchioni	269	20.47	1
Total		1,314	100.00	8
Valid votes		1,314	96.69	
Invalid/blank votes		45	3.31	
Total votes		1,359	100.00	
Registered voters/turnout		3,233	42.04	

=== Domagnano ===
List	Mayoral candidate	Votes	%	Seats
Domagnano al Centro	Marcello Andreani	1,033	100.00	8
Total		1,033	100.00	8
Valid votes		1,033	96.18	
Invalid/blank votes		41	3.82	
Total votes		1,074	100.00	
Registered voters/turnout		2,738	39.23	

=== Faetano ===
List	Mayoral candidate	Votes	%	Seats
Faetano Viva	Giorgio Moroni	399	100.00	6
Total		399	100.00	6
Valid votes		399	94.33	
Invalid/blank votes		24	5.67	
Total votes		423	100.00	
Registered voters/turnout		928	45.58	

=== Fiorentino ===
List	Mayoral candidate	Votes	%	Seats
Fiorentino Viva	Claudio Mancini	425	50.36	5
Fiorentino da Vivere	Nicoletta Canini	419	49.64	3
Total		844	100.00	8
Valid votes		844	94.41	
Invalid/blank votes		50	5.59	
Total votes		894	100.00	
Registered voters/turnout		1,987	44.99	

=== Montegiardino ===
List	Mayoral candidate	Votes	%	Seats
Insieme per Montegiardino	Giacomo Rinaldi	413	100.00	6
Total		413	100.00	6
Valid votes		413	96.27	
Invalid/blank votes		16	3.73	
Total votes		429	100.00	
Registered voters/turnout		727	59.01	

=== Serravalle ===
List	Mayoral candidate	Votes	%	Seats
Uncastello per tutti... Insieme si può	Roberto Ercolani	1,542	51.09	5
Insieme per il castello	Giovanni Ragini	837	27.73	2
Serravalle: un castello da vivere insieme	Vittorio Brigliadori	639	21.17	1
Total		3,018	100.00	8
Valid votes		3,018	95.18	
Invalid/blank votes		153	4.82	
Total votes		3,171	100.00	
Registered voters/turnout		8,246	38.46	
