= Franz Muhri =

Austrian communist politician (1924–2001)

Leader of the Communist Party of Austria
- In office 1965–1990
- Preceded by: Johann Koplenig

Personal details
- Born: 21 October 1924 Steyregg, Upper Austria
- Died: 7 September 2001 (aged 76) Vienna, Austria
- Children: 1

Franz Muhri (1924–2001) was a politician who headed the Communist Party of Austria between 1965 and 1990.

== Early life and education ==
Muhri was born in Steyregg, Upper Austria, on 21 October 1924. He completed his primary school education worked in various jobs. He attended evening courses on typing and bookkeeping. He joined the resistance movement after Austria was annexed to Nazi Germany in March 1938.

== Career and activities ==
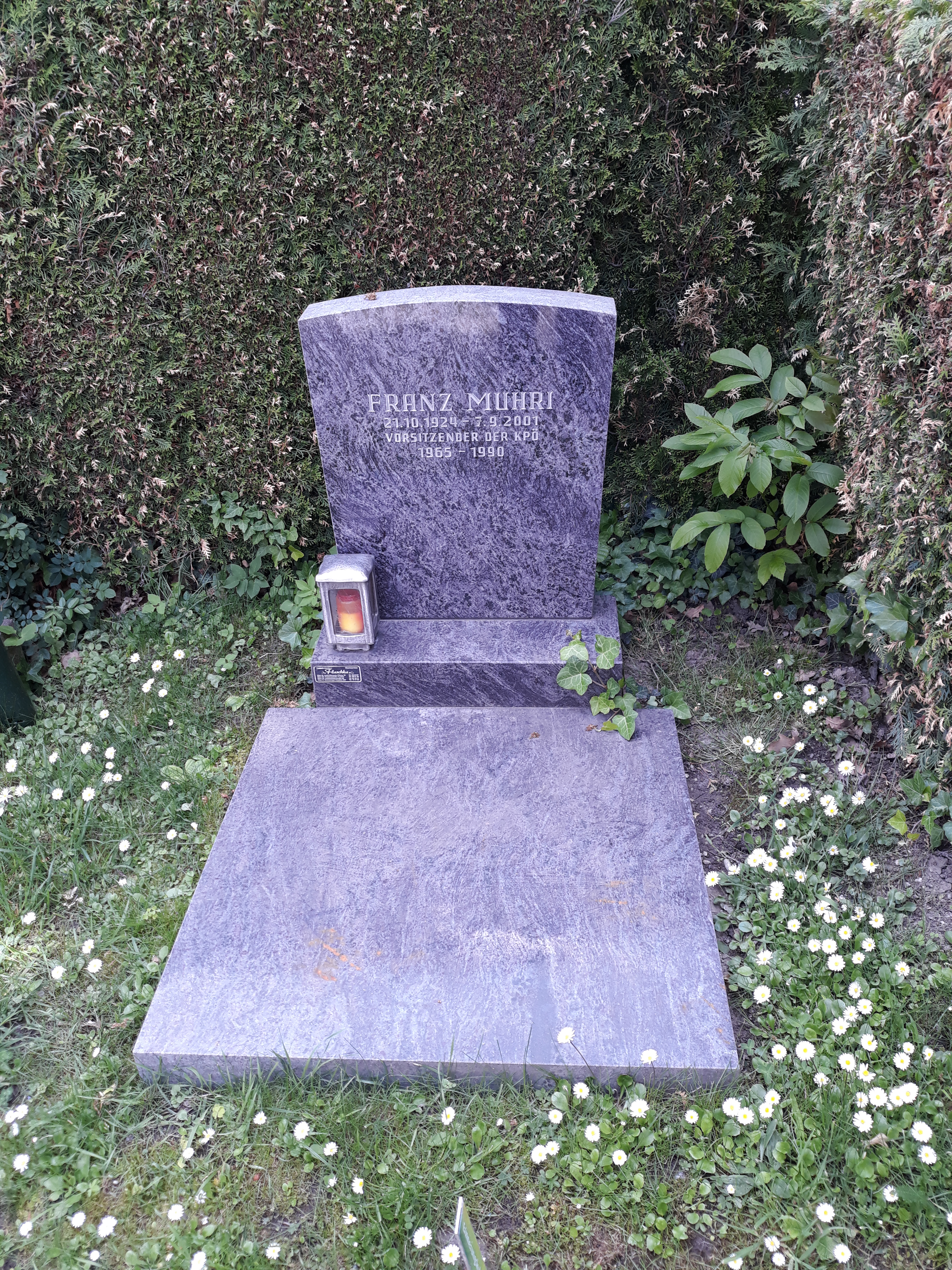
Grave of Franz Muhri in Vienna

Muhri worked as a construction worker in Graz until 1942 when he was drafted into the army, but he escaped from the city and went underground in western Styria until the end of World War II. He joined the Communist Party in 1945 when it was reestablished. He served as the district secretary of the party in Mödling in the 1950s.

Muhri was elected as the chairman of the party in 1965 succeeding Johann Koplenig in the post. One of the most significant incidents during Muhri's tenure was the expulsion of progressive party members, including Franz Marek and Ernst Fischer, in late 1960s. Muhri participated some congresses of the Soviet Communist Party, including the 27th Congress held in 1986. He led the party until 1990. He retired from politics the same year.

=== Views ===
Muhri was part of the moderate group within the Communist Party when he was elected as party leader in 1965. However, he began to collaborate with the conservative group within the party from the 21st Party Congress in May 1970. He argued in his speech at the European Communist Parties Conference held in East Berlin in June 1976 that the Soviet Union was the most powerful socialist state and a major drive for peace.

The Communist Party under the leadership of Muhri did not endorse the invasion of Czechoslovakia by the Soviet Union in 1968. He himself stated that the invasion was harmful to the entire communist movement. However, the party adopted a much more hard line approach from 1970. It supported the reforms declared by the Soviet leader Mikhail Gorbachev.

== Personal life, work and death ==
Muhri had a daughter. He was published a book entitled Kein Ende der Geschichte (German: No end of history) dated 1995.

Muhri died of cancer in Vienna on 7 September 2001 at the age of 76.
