= 1997 San Marino referendum =

26 October 1997
- Do you want that corporations with the purpose of acquiring, administering or selling real estate have to exercise their economic activities in the form of a public company?

Results
Choice	Votes	%
Yes	11,877	88.08%
No	1,607	11.92%
Valid votes	13,484	97.04%
Invalid or blank votes	412	2.96%
Total votes	13,896	100.00%
Registered voters/turnout	29,932	46.43%

A referendum was held in San Marino on 26 October 1997. Voters were asked whether they approved of a proposal that any corporation buying, administering or selling land and property would have to be a public company. It was approved by 88.1% of voters.

== Results ==
Do you want that corporations with the purpose of acquiring, administering or selling real estate have to exercise their economic activities in the form of a public company?

Choice	Votes	%
For	11,877	88.1
Against	1,607	11.9
Invalid/blank votes	412	–
Total	13,896	100
Registered voters/turnout	29,932	46.4
Source: Nohlen & Stöver
