= 2011 San Marino public property referendum =

27 March 2011
- Do you want Law no. 82 of 5 May 2010 to be repealed: Amendment of Law no. 6 of 21 January 2004; Inalienability of publicly owned land and regulation of exchanges?

Results
Choice	Votes	%
Yes	12,166	92.37%
No	1,005	7.63%
Valid votes	13,171	98.81%
Invalid or blank votes	158	1.19%
Total votes	13,329	100.00%
Registered voters/turnout	32,972	40.43%

A referendum on repealing changes made to the law on the sale of public property was held in San Marino on 27 March 2011. It was approved by 12,166 voters, passing the 32% quorum of registered voters (10,522) required.

== Background ==
On 3 May 2010 the Grand and General Council had changed the law on the sale of public property by a vote of 29 to 26. The change to the law lowered the number of votes required in the Council required to sell public property from 40 out of 60 to 30. Following this decision, the Associazione Micologia Sammarinese started a petition on 24 June. They submitted it on 16 September with 660 signatures, surpassing the quorum of 1.5% of registered voters (496) required within three months. The Collegio della Garante Costituzionalità delle norms approved the referendum on 29 September 2010, and the date was set by the Captains Regent on 28 December.

== Results ==
Choice	Votes	%
For	12,166	92.37
Against	1,005	7.63
Invalid/blank votes	158	–
Total	13,329	100
Registered voters/turnout	32,972	40.43
Source: Direct Democracy
