= 2003 San Marino voting system referendum =

A referendum on the voting system was held in San Marino on 3 August 2003. The proposed change would have reduced the number of preferential votes from three to one. Although it was approved by 80.72% of voters, the number voting in favour (8,755) did not pass the required quorum of 32% of all registered voters (10,105).

== Background ==
The original proposal was to only reduce the number of preferential votes for overseas voters. However, the Electoral Tribunal ruled on 10 June 2003, that this was inadmissible, as it differentiated between voters in the country and abroad.

== Results ==
Choice	Votes	%
For	8,755	80.72
Against	2,091	19.28
Invalid/blank votes	227	–
Total	11,073	100
Registered voters/turnout	31,577	35.07
Source: Direct Democracy
