= Democratic Consent–Republican Party =

Political party in San Marino

Democratic Consent–Republican Party (Italian: Intesa Democratico–Partito Repubblicano, ID–PR) was a political party in San Marino.

== History ==
The party contested national elections for the first time in 1983, when it received 2% of the vote, winning one of the 60 seats in the Grand and General Council. However, it did not contest any further elections.
