= Democratic Convention (San Marino) =

Political party in San Marino

Democratic Convention (Italian: Convenzione Democratico, CD) was a political alliance in San Marino.

== History ==
The alliance contested the 1998 elections, being formed by the Sammarinese Democratic Progressive Party (PPDS), Ideas in Motion (IM) and the Democratic Sammarinese Union (USD). The alliance received 18.6% of the vote, winning 11 of the 60 seats in the Grand and General Council, becoming the third-largest faction.
