= 2008 San Marino referendum =

2008 referendum in San Marino

Four referendums were held in San Marino on 16 March 2008. Voters were asked questions on the voting system, raising salaries in line with inflation, projects, and the abolition of temporary employment contracts. As voter turnout was just 35.36%, all four referendums failed to pass the 32% quorum of registered voters required.

== Results ==
=== Voting system ===
Voters were asked whether they wanted to only allow voters a single preference on their ballots.

| Choice | Votes | % |
|---|---|---|
| For | 7,584 | 69.41 |
| Against | 3,342 | 30.59 |
| Invalid/blank votes | 325 | – |
| Total | 11,251 | 100 |
| Registered voters/turnout | 31,819 | 35.36 |
Source: Direct Democracy

=== Wages rising in line with inflation ===
Voters were asked whether they wished for salaries of employees to be revalued on 1 January each year in line with the rate of inflation recorded by the Centro di Elaborazione Dati e Statistica dello Stato.

| Choice | Votes | % |
|---|---|---|
| For | 6,922 | 64.87 |
| Against | 3,479 | 35.13 |
| Invalid/blank votes | 549 | – |
| Total | 11,220 | 100 |
| Registered voters/turnout | 31,819 | 35.36 |
Source: Direct Democracy

=== Projects ===
Voters were asked whether they wished to delete Article 18 of the September 2005 law on promoting, supporting and developing employment training, which related to projects.

| Choice | Votes | % |
|---|---|---|
| For | 6,370 | 60.42 |
| Against | 4,175 | 39.58 |
| Invalid/blank votes | 676 | – |
| Total | 11,221 | 100 |
| Registered voters/turnout | 31,819 | 35.36 |
Source: Direct Democracy

=== Temporary contracts ===
Voters were asked whether they wished to delete Article 17 of the September 2005 law on promoting, supporting and developing employment training, which related to temporary contracts.

| Choice | Votes | % |
|---|---|---|
| For | 6,426 | 60.66 |
| Against | 4,167 | 39.34 |
| Invalid/blank votes | 628 | – |
| Total | 11,221 | 100 |
| Registered voters/turnout | 31,819 | 35.36 |
Source: Direct Democracy
