= 1999 San Marino citizenship referendum =

12 September 1999
- Do you want law no. 66 of 16 June 1999 "on the citizenship", which was approved by the Grand and General Council at its session of 16 June 1999, to come into force?

Results
Choice	Votes	%
Yes	9,327	56.88%
No	7,072	43.12%
Valid votes	16,399	96.68%
Invalid or blank votes	564	3.32%
Total votes	16,963	100.00%
Registered voters/turnout	30,194	56.18%

A referendum on the citizenship law was held in San Marino on 12 September 1999. Voters were asked whether the new citizenship law passed on 16 June should come into force. Although a majority voted in favour, the quorum of 32% of registered voters (9,663) was not achieved and the referendum failed.

== Results ==
Do you want law no. 66 of 16 June 1999 "on the citizenship", which was approved by the Grand and General Council at its session of 16 June 1999, to come into force?

Choice	Votes	%
For	9,327	56.88
Against	7,072	43.12
Total	16,399	100.00
Valid votes	16,399	96.68
Invalid/blank votes	564	3.32
Total votes	16,963	100.00
Registered voters/turnout	30,194	56.18
Source: Nohlen & Stöver
