= 1974 San Marino general election =

National election

- 8 September 1974
- All 60 seats in the Grand and General Council; 31 seats needed for a majority
- Turnout: 79.70% (▲0.23pp)
Party	Leader	Vote %	Seats	+/–
PDCS		39.63	25	−2
PCS		23.60	15	+1
PSDIS		15.41	9	−2
PSS		13.92	8	+1
CDR	Bonelli Menetto	2.96	1	New
PDP		1.98	1	0
MLS		1.62	1	0
This lists parties that won seats. See the complete results below.
Secretary for Foreign Affairs before	Secretary for Foreign Affairs after election
Gian Luigi Berti; PDCS	Gian Luigi Berti; PDCS

General elections were held in San Marino on 8 September 1974. The Sammarinese Christian Democratic Party remained the largest party, winning 25 of the 60 seats in the Grand and General Council, and formed a coalition with the Sammarinese Socialist Party.

== Electoral system ==
Voters had to be citizens of San Marino and at least 24 years old. This was the first election in San Marino with passive suffrage for women.

== Results ==
Party	Votes	%	Seats	+/–
Sammarinese Christian Democratic Party	5,451	39.63	25	–2
Sammarinese Communist Party	3,246	23.60	15	+1
Sammarinese Independent Democratic Socialist Party	2,119	15.41	9	–2
Sammarinese Socialist Party	1,914	13.92	8	+1
Committee for the Defence of the Republic	407	2.96	1	New
Democratic People's Party	272	1.98	1	New
Movement for Constitutional Freedoms	223	1.62	1	0
Communist Party (Marxist–Leninist) of San Marino	121	0.88	0	0
Total	13,753	100.00	60	0
Valid votes	13,753	97.64		
Invalid/blank votes	333	2.36		
Total votes	14,086	100.00		
Registered voters/turnout	17,673	79.70		
Source: Nohlen & Stöver
