= Sammarinese Democratic Progressive Party =

Sammarinese Democratic Progressive Party Partito Progressista Democratico Sammarinese
- Founded: 1990
- Dissolved: 2001
- Preceded by: Sammarinese Communist Party
- Merged into: Party of Democrats
- Ideology: Post-communism; Democratic socialism
- Political position: Left-wing
- Italian counterpart: Democratic Party of the Left
- Colours: Red

Party flag
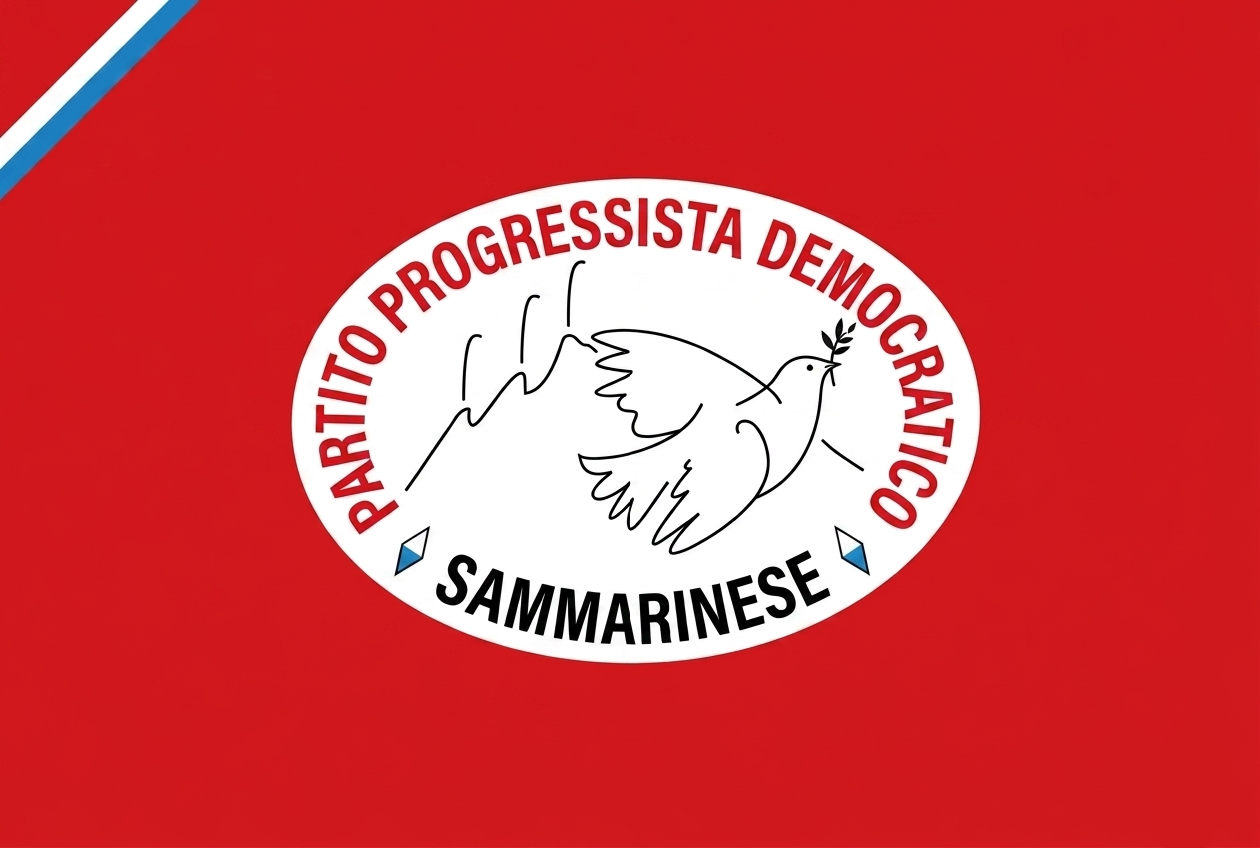

Website
- http://www.ppds.sm

The Sammarinese Democratic Progressive Party (Partito Progressista Democratico Sammarinese, PPDS) was a democratic socialist political party in San Marino. Its Italian counterpart was the Democratic Party of the Left.

The party was formed in 1990 as the successor to the Sammarinese Communist Party. In 1992, some hard-liners who did not accept the abandonment of communism left to form the Sammarinese Communist Refoundation. On 25 March 2001, the PPDS merged with two minor groups, the Ideas in Motion and the Socialists for Reform, into the Party of Democrats.

Their website featured Quotes from the President Maurizio Tommassoni, as well as the Secretary Claudio Felici of the PDSS (Partito Democratico della Sinistra Sammarinese).

Additionally, the site featured quotes from Francesca Michelotti, a representative of the united left in Sammarinese.

== Election History ==
Year	Votes	%	Seats	+/–
1993	4,064	18.58	11	New
1998 (Coalition of: PPDS–IM–CD	4,065	18.64	11	0

== See also ==
- Democratic Party of the Left
