= 1982 San Marino citizenship referendum =

1982 proposed law in San Marino

| 25 July 1982 |
- Do you want to abolish law no. 11 of 25 February 1974 and any practice or act according to which, a woman who marries a citizen of a foreign state and takes up the citizenship of her husband cannot continue to hold Sanmarinese citizenship?

Results
| Choice | Votes | % |
|---|---|---|
| Yes | 6,156 | 42.68% |
| No | 8,266 | 57.32% |
| Valid votes | 14,422 | 98.41% |
| Invalid or blank votes | 233 | 1.59% |
| Total votes | 14,655 | 100.00% |
| Registered voters/turnout | 21,004 | 69.77% |

A referendum on the citizenship law was held in San Marino on 25 July 1982. The proposed abolition of the law failed, with 57.3% voting against it.

== Question ==
Do you want to abolish law no. 11 of 25 February 1974 and any practice or act according to which, a woman who marries a citizen of a foreign state and takes up the citizenship of her husband cannot continue to hold Sanmarinese citizenship?

== Results ==
| Choice | Votes | % |
|---|---|---|
| For | 6,156 | 42.7 |
| Against | 8,266 | 57.3 |
| Invalid/blank votes | 233 | – |
| Total | 14,655 | 100 |
| Registered voters/turnout | 21,004 | 69.8 |
Source: Nohlen & Stöver
