= 2021 San Marino abortion referendum =

- 26 September 2021
- Do you want women to be allowed to voluntarily terminate pregnancy until the twelfth week of gestation, and also thereafter if there is danger to the life of the woman or if there are abnormalities and malformations of the fetus that pose a serious risk to the physical or psychological health of the woman?

Results
Choice	Votes	%
Yes	11,119	77.30%
No	3,265	22.70%
Valid votes	14,384	98.80%
Invalid or blank votes	175	1.20%
Total votes	14,559	100.00%
Registered voters/turnout	35,411	41.11%
- Results by castelli

A referendum on the legality of abortion was held in San Marino on 26 September 2021. The result was an overwhelming vote in favour of legalisation.

== Background ==
Abortion was banned under any circumstance in Sammarinese law (Articles 153 and 154 of the Criminal Code), making it one of four European countries, along with Malta, Andorra and the Vatican City, where similar laws were in place. Abortions in cases of endangering the life of the mother were de facto allowed out of medical necessity, however, despite this exception not being explicitly mentioned in the legislation. Punishment for violation of the law was a sentence of three to five years in prison.

Women seeking abortions could go to neighbouring Italy (where abortion is legal since 1978), but for a cost of 2000 to 2500 euros, not reimbursed by the Sammarinese health care, as it was illegal at home.

The referendum question was published on 15 March 2021, after the RETE Movement and the Union of Sammarinese Women collected enough signatures (equivalent to 3% of registered voters) under the law permitting referendums passed in 1994. Before the referendum, the last attempt to legalise abortion in some form was in 1974, which was rejected.

== Party positions ==
=== Yes ===
- RETE Movement
- Libera
- Party of Socialists and Democrats

=== No ===
- Christian Democratic Party

=== No position ===
- Domani Motus Liberi
- Future Republic

== Results ==
The referendum passed despite being strongly opposed by the Catholic church, with the Bishop of San Marino, Andrea Turazzi, expressing that the church was "decidedly against" the proposal. Turnout was 41.1%, slightly lower than the 2019 referendum which amended electoral and anti-discrimination laws.

Choice	Votes	%
For	11,119	77.30
Against	3,265	22.70
Total	14,384	100.00
Valid votes	14,384	98.80
Invalid/blank votes	175	1.20
Total votes	14,559	100.00
Registered voters/turnout	35,411	41.11
Source: Referendum.sm

== Aftermath ==
The referendum proposed legalising abortion up to the 12th week of gestation, or if the pregnancy poses a risk to the woman's life, or if there are "abnormalities and malformations of the fetus that pose a serious risk to the physical or psychological health of the woman".

With the passage of the referendum, the San Marino parliament was required to pass a law to enact its result. The law entered into force on 12 September 2022.

San Marino was one of the last European states where abortion remained criminalised without explicit exception (along with Andorra, Malta and Vatican City), and thus joined other European Catholic countries like Ireland, where a 2018 referendum also approved allowing the procedure.
