= Socialists for Reform =

Socialists for Reform (Italian: Socialisti per le Riforme, SR) was a political party in San Marino.

== History ==
The party was formed in December 1975 when the Sammarinese Independent Democratic Socialist Party split into two; the more left-wing faction of five MPs formed the Unitary Socialist Party and the moderate faction of three MPs formed the Party of Socialist Democracy (Partito di Democrazia Socialista). In the 1978 elections the new party received 4.2% of the vote, winning two seats in the Grand and General Council.

By the 1983 elections the party had been renamed the Sammarinese Socialist Democratic Party (Partito Socialista Democratico Sanmmarinese). Its vote share dropped to 2.9% and it was reduced to a single seat. In the 1988 elections the party's vote share fell again, this time to 1.1%, and it lost its only seat. It did not contest the 1993 elections

The party was later renamed Socialists for Reform, and won two seats in the 1998 elections. In 2001 it merged with the Sammarinese Democratic Progressive Party to form the Party of Democrats.
