= Sammarinese Democratic Socialist Party =

Defunct political party in San Marino

The Sammarinese Democratic Socialist Party (Italian: Partito Socialista Democratico Sammarinese, PSDS) was a political party in San Marino.

== History ==
The party began as a loose group of MPs in the Grand and General Council, and was part of the Popular Alliance alongside the Sammarinese Christian Democratic Party. It began to formally campaign under the PSDS name for the 1951 general elections, in which it won three seats. It was reduced to two seats in the 1955 elections, and ceased to exist in 1957 when it merged with a group of six MPs who had left the Sammarinese Socialist Party to form the Sammarinese Independent Democratic Socialist Party.
