= 1906 San Marino citizenry meeting =

The 1906 San Marino citizenry meeting was a session of the Arengo (assembly of all householders) in San Marino. It was the first such meeting in three centuries. It ended oligarchic rule and resulted in the first modern democratic elections in the country.

Since the Middle Ages, the Meeting (Arengo in Italian) had been declared the supreme authority of the Republic. However, during the 17th century, the Meeting created the Princely and Sovereign Council to rule the country. The Council itself refused for centuries to convene the Meeting, passing a law introducing the co-option of its members, so as to become fully independent.

At the beginning of the 20th century, the Sammarinese Socialist Party called for the restoration of democracy in the country. After some delays, the Meeting was summoned on 25 March 1906 in the main parish church. Householders were asked whether the system of co-option of councillors for life should continue, and whether the size of councils should be proportionate to the population of the communities they represented. The first proposal was rejected by 90.65% of voters, and the second was approved by 94.89%. Consequently, the first-ever elections in the country were held on 10 June 1906.

== Results ==
=== Maintaining the co-optation ===
Do you want to maintain the oligarchic co-optation of the Council?

Choice	Votes	%
For	75	9.35
Against	727	90.65
Invalid/blank votes	3	–
Total	805	100
Registered householders	1,477	54.50
Source: Direct Democracy

=== Council apportionment ===
Do you want to equally divide the council seats between the city and the countryside?

Choice	Votes	%
For	761	94.89
Against	41	5.11
Invalid/blank votes	3	–
Total	805	100
Registered householders	1,477	54.50
Source: Direct Democracy
