= Sammarinese Independent Democratic Socialist Party =

Sammarinese Independent Democratic Socialist Party Partito Socialista Democratico Indipendente Sammarinese
- Founded: 1957
- Dissolved: 1990s
- Merger of: Sammarinese Democratic Socialist Party
- Succeeded by: Unitary Socialist Party–Socialist Agreement; Socialists for Reform
- Ideology: Democratic socialism Social democracy Anti-Communism
- Italian counterparts: Italian Democratic Socialist Party

The Sammarinese Independent Democratic Socialist Party (Italian: Partito Socialista Democratico Indipendente Sammarinese, PSDIS) was a social-democratic political party in San Marino. Its Italian counterpart was the Italian Democratic Socialist Party.

It was founded on 14 April 1957 following a split from the Sammarinese Socialist Party (PSS), which emerged when Alvaro Casali, secretary of PSS and editor of Il Nuovo Titano was expelled from that party. The issue behind the split was that the minority around Casali wanted to break the cooperation between PSS and the Sammarinese Communist Party (PCS). Five other members of the Grand and General Council (including Domenico Forcellini, Giuseppe Forcellini, Federico Micheloni and Pio Galassi) followed Casali, and the group merged with the Sammarinese Democratic Socialist Party to form the PSDIS.

The party, which was later transformed into the United Socialist Party, gained always more than 10% of the vote (from a low of 11.1% in 1978 and 15.4% in 1974), often surpassing the PSS. Since 1957 the party entered in a coalition government together with the Sammarinese Christian Democratic Party (PDCS) and in the early 1990s finally merged with the PSS, who had distanced itself from the PCS and also become a coalition partner of the PDCS.
