= Sammarinese Communist Party =

Communist Party of San Marino Partito Comunista Sammarinese
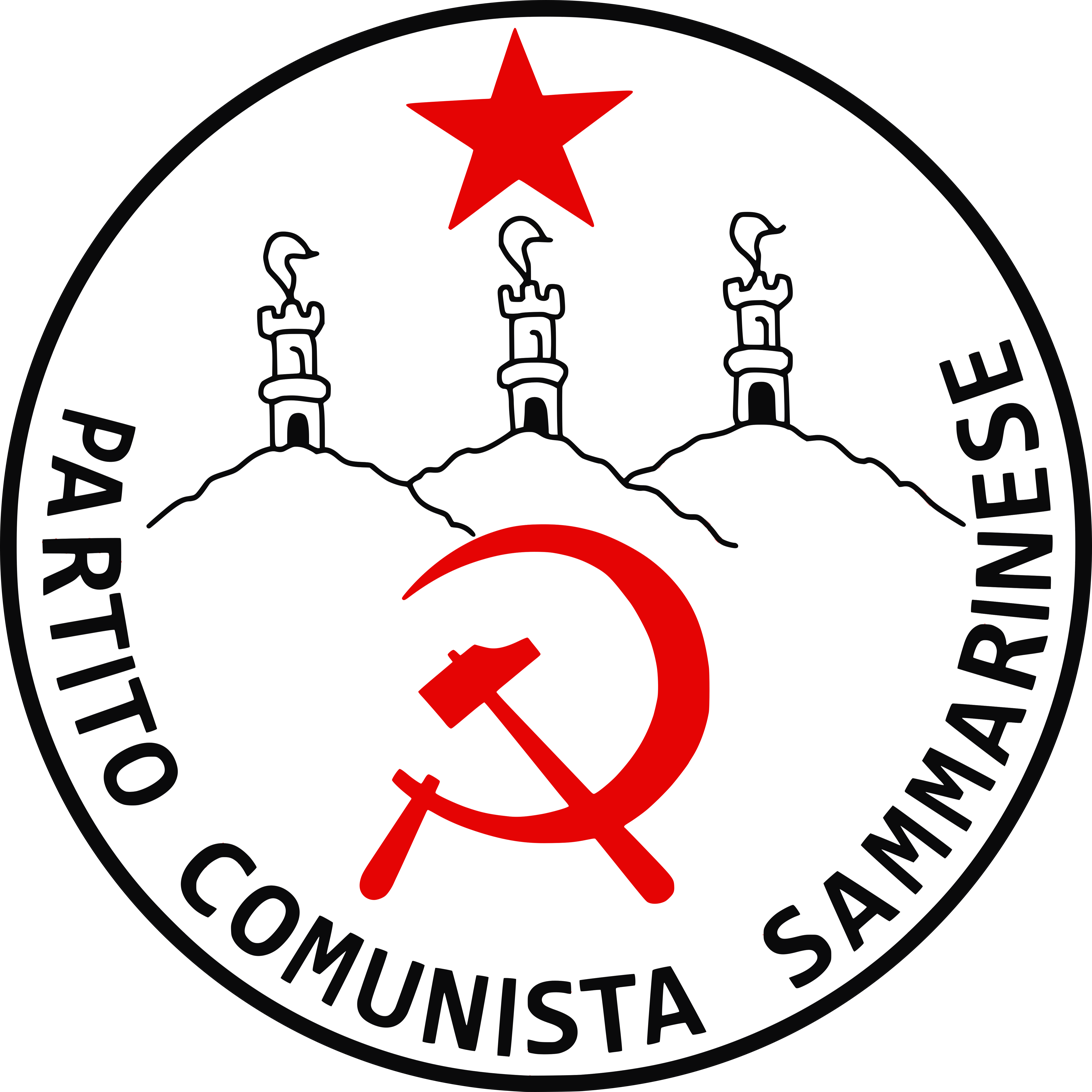
- Founded: 21 January 1921
- Dissolved: 1990
- Split from: Sammarinese Socialist Party
- Succeeded by: Sammarinese Democratic Progressive Party
- Ideology: Communism; Eurocommunism; Marxism-Leninism (until 1970s)
- Political position: Left-wing
- National affiliation: Committee of Freedom (1945–1955)
- Italian counterpart: Communist Party of Italy (until 1926); Italian Communist Party (after 1943)

Party flag

The Sammarinese Communist Party (Italian: Partito Comunista Sammarinese, abbreviated PCS) was a Eurocommunist political party in the small European republic of San Marino. It was founded in 1921 as a section of the Communist Party of Italy (PCI). The organization existed for its first two decades as an underground political organisation.

Between 1945 and the spring of 1957 the PCS governed the country in coalition with the Sammarinese Socialist Party (PSS). The communist-socialist coalition lost power in the events known as Fatti di Rovereta.

The PCS returned to membership in a governing parliamentary coalition in 1978, with its adherents remaining as part of the leadership group until 1992. In 1991, with the fall of the Soviet Union, the PCS formally renounced communism and relaunched itself as the Sammarinese Democratic Progressive Party (PPDS).

== History ==
=== Establishment ===
San Marino is a European microstate, the third smallest in Europe, with an area of just 61 square kilometers (24 square miles). Despite its small size and tiny population, the tiny nation — wholly surrounded by Italy — was the home of a communist political party from 1921, the Communist Party of San Marino (Partito Communista di San Marino), or PCS. The organization was established as a section of the Communist Party of Italy (PCI).

The party's first two decades were spent in the political underground, as San Marino was dominated, like Italy, by the fascist movement in the form of the Sammarinese Fascist Party, which held all 60 of the seats in the country's unicameral parliament from the election of 1923 until the end of the Second World War in 1945. The party was refounded in 1940 under the leadership of Ermenegildo Gasperoni (1906–1994).

=== Period of coalition government ===
The PCS was a governing party of San Marino in coalition with the Socialist Party of San Marino (PSSM) from 1945 until March 1957.

=== Crisis of 1957 ===
Following events in the Eastern Bloc in 1956, some of the socialist deputies abandoned the coalition. On September 18, 1957, the coalition lost its majority when a socialist deputy crossed over to the opposition, reducing the number of pro-coalition deputies to 29. The tenure of the assembly ended on October 1, 1957, placing the government in constitutional limbo. The Christian Democratic deputies refused to attend session; instead, they occupied a factory in Rovereta and set up a provisional government there. The Italian and U.S. government pledged support to the provisional government, whilst the communist-socialist coalition (with support of Italian communists) sought to resist the attempt to establish a provisional government.

=== Years of opposition ===
After the failed attempt at a coup in 1957, the PCS remained an opposition party in San Marino, excluded from the government coalition. The new non-communist government won reelection in September 1959, with the PCS's parliamentary delegation falling to 16 members, joined by 8 Socialists.

The PCS remained a recognized independent member of the international communist movement, sending delegations to international conferences in 1957, 1959, and 1960 and to the 22nd Congress of the Communist Party of the Soviet Union in October 1961. With the split of the world communist movement into pro-Soviet and pro-Chinese factions during the 1960s, the PCS remained firmly pro-Soviet.

In national elections held on September 8, 1974, the PCS received 3,246 votes (23% of those cast) and won 16 seats to the Great and General Council — a gain of 1 seat from the previous election, held in 1969.

=== Return to government ===
In 1978 the PCS returned to government as part of a coalition with the Socialist Party and a new organization formed three years earlier, the Unitary Socialist Party (PSU). This made San Marino in 1978 the only country in Western Europe with a Communist Party as a participant in a governing coalition.

A scheduled election held on May 29, 1983 saw the PCS receiving 24.3% of the vote cast for the General Council (parliament), thereby electing 15 Communists to the body. These were joined by 9 Socialists, and 8 members of the SUP — a total of 32 of the 60 seats as part of a new Communist-Socialist unity government. This government remained in power until a 1986 corruption scandal shattered the Socialists, with the Communists remaining in government through an unlikely coalition with the center-right Sammarinese Christian Democratic Party (PDCS) until 1992.

At the national election held on May 29, 1988, the PCS garnered 28.7% of the votes cast, winning 18 of 60 seats on the General Council.

=== Structure ===
The PCS was governed by a 17-member Central Committee, elected at periodic party congresses. This body selected a 10-member Executive Committee from its ranks to handle daily party governance.

The General Secretary of the organization from its 1940 reformation until the early 1970s was Ermenegildo Gasperoni. In 1973, Gasperoni was moved into the more ceremonial role of party chairman, with Umberto Barulli (1921–1993) taking the helm as General Secretary. Barulli was replaced in turn as General Secretary by Gilberto Ghiotti in 1984, with Ghiotti remaining in power until the end of the party in 1990.

The PCS was the chief sponsor of two subsidiary organizations, the Federation of Communist Women of San Marino and the Communist Youth Federation of San Marino.

Party membership in 1965 was estimated at 960 out of a total national population of about 17,000. In 1976 total membership was estimated by another scholar at about 300 from a national population of 19,000.

The official organ of the PCS was the newspaper La Scintilla, a publication which was not produced on a regular chronological basis.

=== Restructuring ===
With the collapse of the Soviet Union in 1990, in parallel to the transformation of PCI into the Democratic Party of the Left (PDS) in Italy, the PCS formally renounced communism and remade itself as the Sammarinese Democratic Progressive Party (PPDS). This change was followed by a split of communist hard-liners who formed the Sammarinese Communist Refoundation (RCS).

With the renaming of the organization at the 12th Party Congress of April 1990, the name of the official organ was changed from La Scintilla to Progresso. The party's former hammer-and-sickle logo was dropped at this time, replaced by a drawing of a dove by Pablo Picasso.

== Congresses ==
Congress	Date	Notes and references
1st Congress		
2nd Congress		
3rd Congress		
4th Congress		
5th Congress	March 1955	
6th Congress	March 1961	
7th Congress	April 1968	
8th Congress	February 24–25, 1973	
9th Congress	December 1976	Main report delivered by Umberto Barulli.
10th Congress	Dec. 5–8, 1980	
11th Congress	Jan. 24–26, 1986	
12th Congress	April 27–29, 1990	Attended by 135 delegates. Renames organization as Sammarinese Progressive Democratic Party.

== See also ==
- Italian Communist Party
- Politics of San Marino
