= Sammarinese Socialist Party =

Sammarinese Socialist Party Partito Socialista Sammarinese
- Founded: 1892
- Dissolved: 2005
- Merged into: Party of Socialists and Democrats
- Newspaper: Il Nuovo Titano
- Ideology: Social democracy
- National affiliation: Committee of Freedom (1945–1957)
- International affiliation: Socialist International
- Italian counterpart: Italian Socialist Party
- Colours: Red

Website
- www.pss.sm

The Sammarinese Socialist Party (Italian: Partito Socialista Sammarinese, PSS) was a socialist and, later, social-democratic political party in San Marino. Its Italian counterpart was the Italian Socialist Party and its international affiliation was with the Socialist International.

There was a previous party of the same name existing from 1892 until 1926 when it was banned during Fascist rule. In the 1940s and 1950s the party was closely linked to the Sammarinese Communist Party (PCS) and this led the moderates of the party to split and form the Sammarinese Independent Democratic Socialist Party (PSDIS) in 1957. Later the PSS distanced itself from the PCS and entered in coalition with the Sammarinese Christian Democratic Party (PDCS) and PSDIS, which was re-united with the PSS in the early 1990s.

In the 2001 general election the PSS won 24.2% and 15 seats of 60 in the Grand and General Council and governed as the junior partner in a coalition with the PDCS until 2005, when it merged with the post-communist Party of Democrats to form a united social-democratic party, the Party of Socialists and Democrats (PSD). This led to the split of the centrist wing of the party which formed the New Socialist Party (NPS).
