= Foreign relations of Monaco =

The Principality of Monaco is a sovereign and independent state, linked closely to France by the Treaty of July 1918, which was formally noted in Article 436 of the Treaty of Versailles of 1919. The foreign policy of Monaco is one illustration of this accord: France has agreed to defend the independence and sovereignty of Monaco, while the Monegasque Government has agreed to exercise its sovereign rights in conformity with French interests, whilst at the same time maintaining complete independence. Since then, the relations between the sovereign states of France and Monaco have been further defined in the Treaty of 1945 and the Agreement of 1963.

Although not a member of the European Union (EU), Monaco is closely associated with the economic apparatus of the EU through its customs union with France and its reliance upon the euro as its official currency.

Monaco actively participates in the United Nations, which it joined in 1993. Monaco joined the Council of Europe on October 4, 2004. Monaco also is a member of many international and intergovernmental organizations, including Interpol, the UNESCO, and the World Health Organization (WHO). The International Hydrographic Organization (IHO) is headquartered in Monaco.

The foreign relations are managed by the Department of External Relations.

== Diplomatic relations ==
List of countries which Monaco maintains diplomatic relations with:

#	Country	Date
1	France	29 April 1873
2	Italy	25 April 1875
–	Holy See	21 June 1875
3	Spain	2 June 1876
4	Belgium	2 October 1931
5	Luxembourg	18 December 1947
6	Germany	16 October 1951
7	Switzerland	27 May 1959
8	Netherlands	29 August 1966
9	China	16 January 1995
10	Liechtenstein	16 February 1996
11	El Salvador	14 December 2000
12	Colombia	15 December 2000
13	Maldives	19 March 2001
14	Ecuador	5 April 2001
15	Uruguay	10 April 2001
16	Malta	11 April 2001
17	Thailand	26 June 2006
18	Andorra	7 July 2006
19	Russia	11 July 2006
20	Bosnia and Herzegovina	27 July 2006
21	Slovenia	28 November 2006
22	Israel	30 November 2006
23	United States	7 December 2006
24	Ireland	14 December 2006
25	Japan	14 December 2006
26	Philippines	15 December 2006
27	Qatar	26 December 2006
28	Algeria	31 January 2007
29	San Marino	26 March 2007
30	Argentina	29 March 2007
31	Finland	29 March 2007
32	Austria	16 April 2007
33	Australia	3 May 2007
34	Malaysia	22 May 2007
35	Egypt	31 May 2007
36	Serbia	31 May 2007
37	South Korea	14 June 2007
38	Ukraine	26 July 2007
39	Montenegro	7 September 2007
40	India	21 September 2007
41	United Kingdom	21 September 2007
42	Poland	27 September 2007
–	Sovereign Military Order of Malta	18 October 2007
43	Guatemala	2 November 2007
44	Vietnam	29 November 2007
45	Croatia	6 December 2007
46	Slovakia	13 December 2007
47	Azerbaijan	19 December 2007
48	Cuba	19 December 2007
49	Chile	23 January 2008
50	Mongolia	6 February 2008
51	Estonia	7 February 2008
52	Georgia	7 February 2008
53	Dominican Republic	12 February 2008
54	Morocco	12 February 2008
55	Bulgaria	14 February 2008
56	Canada	13 March 2008
57	Romania	19 March 2008
58	Mexico	21 March 2008
59	Jamaica	4 April 2008
60	Seychelles	15 April 2008
61	Greece	15 May 2008
62	Turkey	28 May 2008
63	Czech Republic	4 July 2008
64	Lesotho	15 July 2008
65	Armenia	15 October 2008
66	Latvia	15 October 2008
67	Portugal	13 November 2008
68	Kazakhstan	15 January 2009
69	Sweden	30 January 2009
70	Saint Vincent and the Grenadines	12 February 2009
71	Pakistan	24 February 2009
72	Dominica	27 February 2009
73	Venezuela	27 May 2009
74	Equatorial Guinea	16 June 2009
75	Senegal	23 June 2009
76	United Arab Emirates	9 October 2009
77	Timor-Leste	19 February 2010
78	Brazil	14 April 2010
79	Saint Kitts and Nevis	21 April 2010
80	Samoa	4 May 2010
81	Afghanistan	13 October 2010
82	Peru	13 October 2010
83	Norway	16 November 2010
84	Indonesia	17 December 2010
85	South Africa	19 January 2011
86	Cyprus	23 February 2011
87	Botswana	24 February 2011
88	Honduras	25 February 2011
89	Panama	2 March 2011
90	Gabon	28 March 2011
91	Lithuania	11 April 2011
92	Saint Lucia	12 May 2011
93	Denmark	16 June 2011
94	Brunei	22 June 2011
95	Moldova	8 September 2011
96	Mauritania	9 September 2011
97	Palau	26 October 2011
98	Albania	24 November 2011
99	Djibouti	1 December 2011
100	Mali	26 January 2012
101	Solomon Islands	6 March 2012
102	Nepal	26 March 2012
103	Iran	10 May 2012
104	Tuvalu	29 May 2012
105	Paraguay	14 June 2012
106	Nigeria	6 July 2012
107	Malawi	31 July 2012
–	Kosovo	24 August 2012
108	Oman	20 February 2013
109	Bahrain	23 September 2013
110	Fiji	13 November 2013
111	Uzbekistan	29 November 2013
112	Republic of the Congo	27 February 2014
113	Rwanda	10 April 2014
114	Sudan	10 April 2014
115	Iceland	5 May 2014
116	Kiribati	20 June 2014
117	Angola	31 July 2014
118	Burkina Faso	19 September 2014
119	Burundi	31 October 2014
120	Turkmenistan	27 August 2015
121	Marshall Islands	29 September 2015
122	Costa Rica	22 October 2015
123	New Zealand	22 October 2015
124	Laos	27 November 2015
125	Togo	9 February 2016
126	Ivory Coast	11 February 2016
127	Belarus	15 April 2016
128	Hungary	2 May 2016
129	Sri Lanka	26 July 2016
130	Tajikistan	13 January 2017
131	Kyrgyzstan	9 March 2017
132	Cape Verde	10 August 2017
133	Democratic Republic of the Congo	5 July 2018
134	Kuwait	19 July 2018
135	Vanuatu	10 September 2018
136	Tunisia	19 September 2018
137	Barbados	5 December 2018
138	Lebanon	22 January 2019
139	Antigua and Barbuda	28 February 2019
140	Benin	8 March 2019
141	Cambodia	11 July 2019
142	Nicaragua	4 September 2019
143	Namibia	12 September 2019
144	Ghana	29 September 2019
145	North Macedonia	29 September 2019
146	Niger	9 October 2019
147	Grenada	13 October 2020
148	Ethiopia	20 October 2020
149	Madagascar	11 December 2020
150	Jordan	29 April 2021
151	Guinea-Bissau	17 May 2022
152	Mozambique	20 October 2022
153	Saudi Arabia	2 March 2023
154	Bangladesh	13 June 2023
155	Bahamas	17 April 2024
156	Nauru	21 May 2024
157	Bolivia	26 July 2024
158	Guinea	3 April 2025
159	Federated States of Micronesia	17 July 2025
160	Singapore	23 September 2025
161	Trinidad and Tobago	24 September 2025
162	Kenya	14 October 2025
163	Liberia	10 March 2026
164	Bhutan	8 June 2026
165	Mauritius	25 August 2026

== Americas ==
Country	Formal relations began on	Notes
Canada	13 March 2008	Canada is accredited to Monaco from its embassy in Paris and maintains an honorary consulate in Monaco.; Monaco is accredited to Canada from its embassy in Washington, D.C., United States, and maintains honorary consulates in Montreal, Toronto and Vancouver.
Colombia	15 December 2000	Colombia is accredited to Monaco from its embassy in Paris.; Monaco has an honorary consulate in Bogotá.
Mexico	21 March 2008	Main article: Mexico–Monaco relations: Mexico is accredited to Monaco from its embassy in Paris and maintains an honorary consulate in Monaco.; Monaco has an honorary consulate in Mexico City.
United States	7 December 2006	See Monaco–United States relations: The United States and Monaco enjoy excellent relations. From 1956 until her death in 1982, the American-born Grace Kelly was married to Prince Rainier III, Prince Albert's father. The United States does not yet have a diplomatic mission located in Monaco but there is an embassy in Paris, and a consulate general in Marseille.; In December 2006, the United States and Monaco upgraded from consular to full diplomatic relations. Shortly thereafter, Craig Stapleton (ambassador to France) was accredited to Monaco, and ambassador Gilles Noghes became the first Monegasque ambassador to the United States.; On December 3, 2013, Maguy Maccario Doylee replaced Noghes as the Principality's new emissary to Washington, DC, following her appointment by Prince Albert II of Monaco. Ambassador Maccario Doyle is the first woman to hold the post at the embassy. She previously served as Consul General of Monaco in New York since 1997 and head of the Principality's Tourism Board in North America since the early 1990s.; Monaco has an embassy in Washington, D.C. and a consulate-general in New York City.; The United States is accredited to Monaco from its embassy in Paris.

== Asia ==
Country	Formal relations began in	Notes
China	16 January 1995	Main article: China–Monaco relations
India	21 September 2007	Main article: India–Monaco relations: India is accredited to Monaco from its embassy in Paris, France.
Indonesia	17 December 2010	Main article: Indonesia–Monaco relations: Due to the resemblance of the colors red and white on their flags, the Monégasque government asked Indonesia to modify its flag during the International Hydrographic Congress on 29 April 1952.; Indonesia has a non-resident embassy in Paris.; Monaco maintains an honorary consulate in Jakarta.
Israel	30 November 2006	Main article: Israel–Monaco relations: Israel is accredited to Monaco from its embassy in Paris, France and has an honorary consulate in Monaco.; Monaco has an honorary consulate in Ramat Gan.
Pakistan	24 February 2009	Pakistan is accredited to Monaco from its embassy in Paris and an honorary consulate was inaugurated in 2012 in Monaco.; Monaco maintains an honorary consulate in Karachi.
South Korea	14 June 2007	Diplomatic relations between South Korea and Monaco were established in June 2007.: Monaco has an honorary consulate in Seoul.; South Korea is accredited to Monaco from its embassy in Paris.

== Europe ==
Country	Formal relations began on	Notes
European Union	29 October 1999	Main article: Monaco–European Union relations Monaco participates in a number of European Union policies through its interaction with France. Monaco is in the EU's customs and VAT area, is a de facto member of the Schengen Area due to its open border with France and uses the euro as its sole currency.
France	29 April 1873	Main article: France–Monaco relations Formal relations were established in 1918. France has agreed to defend the independence and sovereignty of Monaco, while the Monegasque Government has agreed to exercise its sovereign rights in conformity with French interests. Since then, the relations between the sovereign states of France and Monaco have been further defined in the Treaty of 1945 and the Agreement of 1963. In 2002, Monaco renegotiated its 1918 treaty with France. In 2005, it was ratified by both parties and entered into force. The terms of the treaty upgrade France's representation in Monaco from Consulate General to that of an embassy; permit, for the first time, other countries to accredit ambassadors to Monaco; and formally recognize the succession scheme set out in the 1962 Constitution, which extends eligibility to the Prince's daughters and other family members.: France has an embassy in Monte Carlo.; Monaco has an embassy in Paris.
Holy See	21 June 1875	Main article: Holy See–Monaco relations It is part of Monaco's generally accepted cultural and political history that Monaco and the Holy See have maintained a diplomatic friendship bound by the Catholic faith since the founding of the Principality. Article 9 of the Monegasque Constitution, dated 17 December 1962, and modified in 2002, establishes the Catholic religion as the official religion of the sovereign state, which is a Catholic constitutional monarchy ruled by the Catholic Grimaldi dynasty. According to the Annuario Pontificio, the official yearbook of the Holy See, Monaco has maintained a diplomatic representative to the Holy See with the rank of minister plenipotentiary since 1915. In 1982, following the July 1981 signing of a new convention between Monaco and the Holy See reaffirming the close Catholic friendship and diplomatic relations which exists between the Catholic Principality and the Holy See, the rank of Monaco's diplomatic legation was elevated from that of a ministerial rank diplomatic legation to that of an embassy, with Cesar Charles Solamito, being elevated from the rank of minister plenipotentiary to ambassador extraordinary and plenipotentiary in June 1982. Ambassador Solamito served as Monaco's first ambassador to the Holy See until 1997. In 1999, the position of ambassador of Monaco to the Holy See was assumed by Monegasque ambassador Jean Claude Michel. With respect to the Holy See, the Holy See has only maintained a diplomatic legation in Monaco since 2006. The appointment of a papal diplomatic representative to the Principality was subsequent to the revision of Monaco's treaty with France which was revised in 2002 and ratified in 2005. This revised treaty granted the Principality the sovereign prerogative of establishing formal diplomatic relations with other sovereign states at the highest diplomatic level, that of ambassador extraordinary and plenipotentiary—for the Holy See this means at the nunzorial level, i.e., that of an apostolic nunciature headed by an apostolic nuncio (apostolic nuncios normally hold the ecclesiastical rank of archbishop). The first, apostolic nuncio to represent the Holy See to Monaco, with residence and coterminous accreditation to the EU in Brussels, is Archbishop Andre Dupuy. Archbishop Dupuy presented his credentials to HSH Prince Albert II on 26 September 2006.: The Holy See is accredited to Monaco from its apostolic nunciature in Paris.; Monaco has an embassy to the Holy See based in Rome.
Italy	25 April 1875	Main article: Italy–Monaco relations: Italy has an embassy in Monte Carlo.; Monaco has an embassy in Rome.
Norway	16 November 2010	Norway is accredited to Monaco from its embassy in Paris, France and maintains an honorary consulate in Monaco.; Monaco maintains an honorary consulate in Oslo.
Russia	11 July 2006	Main article: Monaco–Russia relations: Monaco and Russia had bilateral relations since 1858, when Russia and Monaco signed treaties and agreements of extradition of criminals, of mutual legal assistance, on recognition of civil status of natural persons and of medical aid. However diplomatic relations were suspended in 1917.; Diplomatic relations were re-established in April 2002.; Monaco is accredited to Russia from its Ministry of Foreign Affairs based in Monaco and maintains honorary consulates in Moscow, Rostov-on-Don and in Saint Petersburg.; Russia is accredited to Monaco from its embassy in Paris and maintains an honorary consulate in Monaco.
Spain	2 June 1876	Main article: Monaco–Spain relations: Monaco has an embassy in Madrid.; Spain is accredited to Monaco from its embassy in Paris, France.
United Kingdom	21 September 2007	Main article: Monaco–United Kingdom relations Monaco established diplomatic relations with the United Kingdom on 21 September 2007.: Monaco maintains an embassy in London.; The United Kingdom is not accredited to Monaco through an embassy; the UK develops relations through its embassy in Paris, France.; Both countries share common membership of the Council of Europe, the European Court of Human Rights, the OSCE, and the United Nations. Bilaterally the two countries have a Tax Information Exchange Agreement.

== See also ==
- Department of External Relations (Monaco)
- List of diplomatic missions in Monaco
- List of diplomatic missions of Monaco
- List of ambassadors to Monaco
