= Microstates and the European Union =

Relationship overview

Currently, all of the European microstates have some form of relations with the European Union (EU).

Andorra, Liechtenstein, Monaco, San Marino, and Vatican City remain outside the EU. Andorra is, by population, the largest of the five microstates with around 89,000 citizens according to Eurostat; all except Liechtenstein use the euro as their currency. Two other small countries, Luxembourg and Malta (which is usually considered one of the European microstates), are full members of the EU and are inhabited by, respectively, populations of around 690,000 and 588,000.

== Status of relations ==
Andorra, Monaco, San Marino, and Vatican City use the euro through monetary agreements with the EU, and have been granted the right to issue a limited number of euro coins. They were allowed to do so as they had used or been tied to the old eurozone currencies. Liechtenstein, on the other hand, uses the Swiss franc.

Liechtenstein is a full member in its own right of the Schengen Agreement, European Free Trade Association (EFTA) and Dublin Regulation on asylum and has signed an agreement to participate in the Prüm Decisions, while Monaco has an open border with France and Schengen laws are administered as if it were a part of France. San Marino and Vatican City, both enclaves within Italy, have open borders with Italy and are de facto part of the Schengen Area. No systematic border checks are conducted between Andorra and the Schengen Area. None of them have any airport, but all have heliports. Monaco has the only seaport; the others are landlocked. Arrival from outside the Schengen Area is allowed in Monaco, but not in San Marino and Vatican City as they have no border controls.

Monaco is a part of the EU customs territory through an agreement with France. San Marino and Andorra are in a customs union with the bloc. Liechtenstein, as a member of the EEA, is within the European Single Market and applies certain EU laws. All of the microstates are also part of other organisations such as the Council of Europe (except Vatican City) and the Organization for Security and Co-operation in Europe.

Iceland and Liechtenstein are members of the European Economic Area (EEA) through the EFTA. San Marino had considered joining the EEA in the past, and held a referendum on submitting an application for EU membership, which was approved by its electorate; however, not enough votes were cast for the result to be considered valid. Iceland was previously an official candidate for accession to the European Union. Had Iceland acceded to the Union, it would have become the EU's smallest state measured by population, but twelfth largest by geographical size. The Icelandic government withdrew its application for membership in 2015.

== Future of relations ==
Countries that could join the European Union Current members Candidate countries Applicant / potential candidate countries Membership possible Membership not possible

Andorra, Monaco, and San Marino have all stated their desire to deepen relations with the EU. In November 2012, after the Council of the European Union had called for an evaluation of the EU's relations with these microstates, which they described as "fragmented", the European Commission published a report outlining options for their further integration into the EU. Unlike Liechtenstein, which is a member of the EEA via the EFTA and the Schengen Agreement, relations with these three states are based on a collection of agreements covering specific issues. The report examined four alternatives to the current situation: 1) a Sectoral Approach with separate agreements with each state covering an entire policy area, 2) a comprehensive, multilateral Framework Association Agreement (FAA) with the three states, 3) EEA membership, and 4) EU membership. The Commission argued that the sectoral approach did not address the major issues and was still needlessly complicated, while EU membership was dismissed in the near future because "the EU institutions are currently not adapted to the accession of such small-sized countries." The remaining options, EEA membership and a FAA with the states, were found to be viable and were recommended by the Commission. In response, the Council requested that negotiations with the three microstates on further integration continue, and that a report be prepared by the end of 2013 detailing the implications of the two viable alternatives and recommendations on how to proceed.

As EEA membership is currently only open to EFTA or EU members, the consent of existing EFTA member states is required for the microstates to join the EEA without becoming members of the EU. In 2011, Jonas Gahr Støre, the then Foreign Minister of Norway which is an EFTA member state, said that EFTA/EEA membership for the microstates was not the appropriate mechanism for their integration into the internal market due to their different requirements than large countries such as Norway, and suggested that a simplified association would be better suited for them. Espen Barth Eide, Støre's successor, responded to the Commission's report in late 2012 by questioning whether the microstates have sufficient administrative capabilities to meet the obligations of EEA membership. However, he stated that Norway was open to the possibility of EFTA membership for the microstates if they decide to submit an application, and that the country had not made a final decision on the matter. Pascal Schafhauser, the Counsellor of the Liechtenstein Mission to the EU, said that Liechtenstein, another EFTA member state, was willing to discuss EEA membership for the microstates provided their joining did not impede the functioning of the organization. However, he suggested that the option direct membership in the EEA for the microstates, outside of both the EFTA and the EU, should be given consideration.

On 18 November 2013 the EU Commission published their report which concluded that "the participation of the small-sized countries in the EEA is not judged to be a viable option at present due to the political and institutional reasons", but that Association Agreements were a more feasible mechanism to integrate the microstates into the internal market, preferably via a single multilateral agreement with all three states (Andorra, Monaco & San Marino). In December 2014 the Council of the European Union approved negotiations being launched on such an agreement, and they began in March 2015. Negotiations had been planned to be concluded by 2020. In December 2023, the European Commission announced the conclusion of negotiations on a new Association Agreement between the EU and Andorra and San Marino; negotiations with Monaco had been suspended in September 2023 due to disputes over financial regulation. The Commission formally put forward a proposal to the Council of the European Union in April 2024 to adopt decisions approving that the agreement be signed and concluded. In December 2025 the Council of the European Union determined that the agreement consisted of mixed competencies, and so would require approval in each EU member state's respective parliaments. In July 2026, following Bulgaria’s withdrawal of its veto, the Council of the EU authorized the signing of the association agreements with Andorra and San Marino, which organises their participation in the single market (including the financial sector if some conditions are fullfilled).

Andorran ambassador to Spain Jaume Gaytán stated in 2015 that he hoped that the new Association Agreement would include provisions to make the states associate members of the Schengen Agreement, though the final text did not include such provisions. However, on 30 May 2024 the Council of the European Union authorised the opening of negotiations for separate agreements between the European Union and Andorra and San Marino, respectively, in order to create a legal basis for the absence of border controls between these countries and the Schengen Area. In September 2026, the Commission proposed to the Council to sign the finalized agreements on border controls with Andorra and San Marino. On 19 October 2026 the European Commission along with Andorra and San Marino signed the new Association Agreement with its approval being subject to ratification by all 3 signatories.

== Summary ==
=== Integration level ===
This table summarises the various components of EU laws applied in the microstates. Some territories of EU member states also have a special status in regard to EU laws applied as is the case with some European Free Trade Association members and their sovereign territories.

| Microstates | Association Agreement | Eurozone | Schengen Area | EU single market | EU customs territory | EU VAT area | Dublin Regulation | Prüm Decisions |
|---|---|---|---|---|---|---|---|---|
| Andorra (relations) | Signed | Yes (Note: Monetary agreement with the EU to issue euros.) | Open border (Note: Although not formally part of the Schengen area, has a de facto open border with France and Spain.) | No | Partial (Note: Customs Union Agreement that eliminates barriers in trade between the country and the EU, as well as the adoption of the EU acquis on imports in regards to third countries; however there are certain exceptions and standard customs procedures still apply between the country and the EU.) | No | No | No |
| Liechtenstein (relations) | Yes (Note: Agreement on the European Economic Area.) | No (Note: Uses the Swiss franc.) | Yes | Yes (Note: Member state of the European Economic Area.) | No (Note: Customs union with Switzerland.) | No | Yes | Yes |
| Monaco (relations) | Negotiations suspended | Yes | De facto (Note: Although not a contracting party to the Schengen Agreement, has an open border with France and Schengen laws are administered as if it were a part of France.) | Partial (Note: Through an agreement with France.) | Yes (Note: Through an agreement with France. Part of the EU Customs territory, administered as part of France.) | Yes (Note: Also part of the EU excise territory.) (Note: Through an agreement with France. Administered as a part of France for taxation purposes.) | No | No |
| San Marino (relations) | Signed | Yes | Open border (Note: Although not formally part of the Schengen area, has a de facto open border with Italy.) | No | Partial | No (Note: Partially participates in the EU excise territory.) (Note: Through an agreement with Italy. Administered as a part of Italy for taxation purposes.) | No | No |
| Vatican City (relations) | No | Yes | Open border | No | No | No | No | No |

=== Size comparison ===
This table provides a comparison between major statistics of the microstates to the smallest EU member states.

| Microstates | Relationship | Population | Area (km^{2}) | GDP (nom) | HDI |
|---|---|---|---|---|---|
| Andorra | Agreements | 79,877 | 467 | $3.4 billion | 0.845 |
| Iceland | EEA State | 376,248 | 102,775 | $27.7 billion | 0.959 |
| Liechtenstein | EEA State | 37,340 | 160 | $5.3 billion | 0.908 |
| Luxembourg | EU State | 672,050 | 2,586 | $90.532 billion | 0.892 |
| Malta | EU State | 519,562 | 316 | $17.15 billion | 0.839 |
| Monaco | Agreements | 38,300 | 2 | $7.672 billion | n/a |
| San Marino | Agreements | 33,600 | 61 | $1.62 billion | n/a |
| Vatican City | Agreements | 453 | 0.44 | n/a | n/a |

== See also ==
- European microstates
- Foreign relations of the European Union
- Potential enlargement of the European Union
- Special member state territories and the European Union
