= Monaco–European Union relations =

European Union-Monaco relations
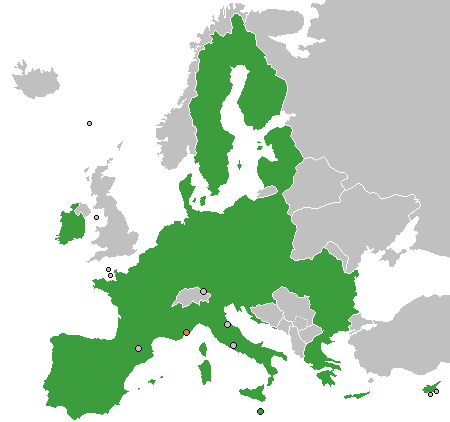
- European Union: Monaco

Relations between the Principality of Monaco and the European Union (EU) are primarily conducted through France. Through that relationship Monaco directly participates in certain EU policies. Monaco is an integral part of the EU customs territory and VAT area, and therefore applies most measures on excise duties and VAT. Monaco borders one EU member state: France. However this relationship does not extend to external trade. Preferential trade agreements between the EU and third countries apply only to goods originating from the customs territory – Monaco may not claim EU origin in this respect.

Monaco is administered as part of the Schengen area, due to its borders and customs territory being treated as part of France. It also officially uses the euro as its sole currency. It uses the euro via an agreement with the EU and France and is allowed by the EU to mint its own coins. Monaco uses the euro as it previously had its currency tied 1:1 with the French franc.

Monaco and the European Union have also concluded agreements on the application of Community legislation to pharmaceuticals, cosmetic products and medical devices (this entered into force on 1 May 2004); and on savings taxation (in force since 1 July 2005).

== Future integration ==
Countries that could join the European Union Current members Candidate countries Applicant / potential candidate countries Membership possible Membership not possible

EU membership for Monaco is unlikely as, aside from its size, unlike the constitutional monarchies within the EU, the Prince of Monaco has considerable executive powers and is not merely a figurehead.

Monaco joined the Council of Europe in 2004, a move that required it to renegotiate its relations with France, which previously had the right to nominate various ministers. This was seen as part of a general move toward European integration.

In November 2012, after the Council of the European Union had called for an evaluation of the EU's relations with the sovereign European microstates of Andorra, Monaco and San Marino, which they described as "fragmented", the European Commission published a report outlining options for their further integration into the EU. Unlike Liechtenstein, which is a member of the European Economic Area (EEA) via the European Free Trade Association (EFTA) and the Schengen Agreement, relations with these three states are based on a collection of agreements covering specific issues. The report examined four alternatives to the current situation: 1) a Sectoral Approach with separate agreements with each state covering an entire policy area, 2) a comprehensive, multilateral Framework Association Agreement (FAA) with the three states, 3) EEA membership, and 4) EU membership. The Commission argued that the sectoral approach did not address the major issues and was still needlessly complicated, while EU membership was dismissed in the near future because "the EU institutions are currently not adapted to the accession of such small-sized countries." The remaining options, EEA membership and a FAA with the states, were found to be viable and were recommended by the Commission. In response, the Council requested that negotiations with the three microstates on further integration continue, and that a report be prepared by the end of 2013 detailing the implications of the two viable alternatives and recommendations on how to proceed.

As EEA membership is currently only open to EFTA or EU members, the consent of existing EFTA member states is required for the microstates to join the EEA without becoming members of the EU. In 2011, Jonas Gahr Støre, the then Foreign Minister of Norway which is an EFTA member state, said that EFTA/EEA membership for the microstates was not the appropriate mechanism for their integration into the internal market due to their different requirements from large countries such as Norway, and suggested that a simplified association would be better suited for them. Espen Barth Eide, Støre's successor, responded to the Commission's report in late 2012 by questioning whether the microstates have sufficient administrative capabilities to meet the obligations of EEA membership. However, he stated that Norway was open to the possibility of EFTA membership for the microstates if they decide to submit an application, and that the country had not made a final decision on the matter. Pascal Schafhauser, the Counsellor of the Liechtenstein Mission to the EU, said that Liechtenstein, another EFTA member state, was willing to discuss EEA membership for the microstates provided their joining did not impede the functioning of the organization. However, he suggested that the option of direct membership in the EEA for the microstates, outside of both the EFTA and the EU, should be given consideration.

On 18 November 2013 the EU Commission published their report which concluded that "the participation of the small-sized countries in the EEA is not judged to be a viable option at present due to the political and institutional reasons", but that Association Agreements were a more feasible mechanism to integrate the microstates into the internal market, preferably via a single multilateral agreement with all three states. In December 2014 the Council of the European Union approved negotiations being launched on such an agreement, and they began in March 2015. By September 2023, negotiations between the EU and Monaco had reached a stalemate, and hence were suspended; some sources suggest a connection with disputes over financial supervision and money laundering, other sources suggested the stalemate was due to irresolvable disagreements over Monaco's policies of granting preference to its own citizens (and, to a secondary degree, France's citizens), which conflicted with the EU's principle of non-discrimination on the basis of nationality. Negotiations on the agreement continued without Monaco's participation, and the EU, Andorra and San Marino reached an agreement on the text in December 2023, pending formal approval by the EU's institutions and Andorra and San Marino's governments.

== See also ==
- France–Monaco relations
- Monaco–Spain relations
- Microstates and the European Union
