= Italy–Monaco relations =

- Monaco: Italy

Italy–Monaco relations are the bilateral relations between Italy and Monaco.

The two countries are roughly 10 km (16 mi) apart and separated by the Alpes-Maritimes department of France. Both countries share many cultural and historical links, with Monaco having many Italian speakers and the country's national language being Ligurian, which is also spoken in northwestern Italy.

== History ==
Prior to the rise of the Grimaldis, Monaco came under control of various empires including the Roman Empire and the Holy Roman Empire and was settled by Ligures. In 1297, Francesco Grimaldi captured the Rock of Monaco and established his own dynasty on the city, whilst it was under the control of the Republic of Genoa. For over 500 years after this, Monaco was captured and came under the sovereignty of several kingdoms, including Spain and France, where it became a protectorate prior to the French Revolution, when revolutionaries captured and occupied the city-state. In 1814, the principality was re-established and became a protectorate of the Kingdom of Sardinia.

In 1860, during the Risorgimento, Sardinia and France signed the Treaty of Turin, which resulted in the cession of the neighbouring County of Nice to Napoleon III, leaving Monaco now completely surrounded by France. Soon after, French replaced Italian as the official language of the principality. The next year, France signed a treaty formally recognising the independence of Monaco. On 25 April 1875, the Kingdom of Italy and Monaco formally established diplomatic relations. During the late 19th-century, Monaco relied on its casino and status as a tax haven to grow and be stable economically, with many wealthy Italians flocking to Monaco, buying property, vacationing, etc.

During World War II, Monaco under Prince Louis II attempted to stay neutral and out of the conflict, though he had close ties with Philippe Pétain, the then-new leader of Nazi-occupied Vichy France. Many Italo-Monégasques supported Benito Mussolini and in 1942, he and Fascist Italy invaded and occupied Monaco for a year until Mussolini's own downfall when it was subsequently occupied by Nazi Germany. In 1944, Italian partisans alongside Americans and Maquis, liberated Monaco from Axis occupation.

== Economic ties ==
Italy is Monaco's second-largest trading partner after France.

In 2015, Monaco and Italy signed a bilateral tax agreement that would allow Italy to attain financial information on Italian nationals who lived in Monaco or had property there in order to prevent tax evasion. It also prevented double taxation on Italians who had split assets or residency in both countries.

== Cultural relations ==
The national language of Monaco is the Monégasque dialect of Ligurian (munegascu), which has taken many words from French and Italian. Italian itself is the third-most commonly spoken language in Monaco after French and Monégasque. Italian cuisine is also prevalent in Monaco.

As of 2016, Italian citizens make 21% of all residents of Monaco. There are also many native Monégasques who are of Italian descent.

On 30 January 2026, Prince Albert II visited Liguria and Piedmont to pay homage to his Grimaldi ancestors.

== Resident diplomatic missions ==
- Italy has an embassy in the city of Monaco.
- Monaco has an embassy in Rome, as well as several consulates through Italy.

== See also ==
- Foreign relations of Italy
- Foreign relations of Monaco
