= Italy–San Marino relations =

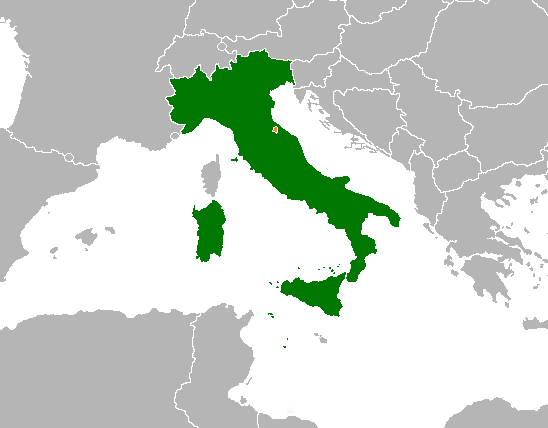
- Italy: San Marino

Diplomatic mission
- Embassy of Italy, San Marino: Embassy of San Marino, Rome

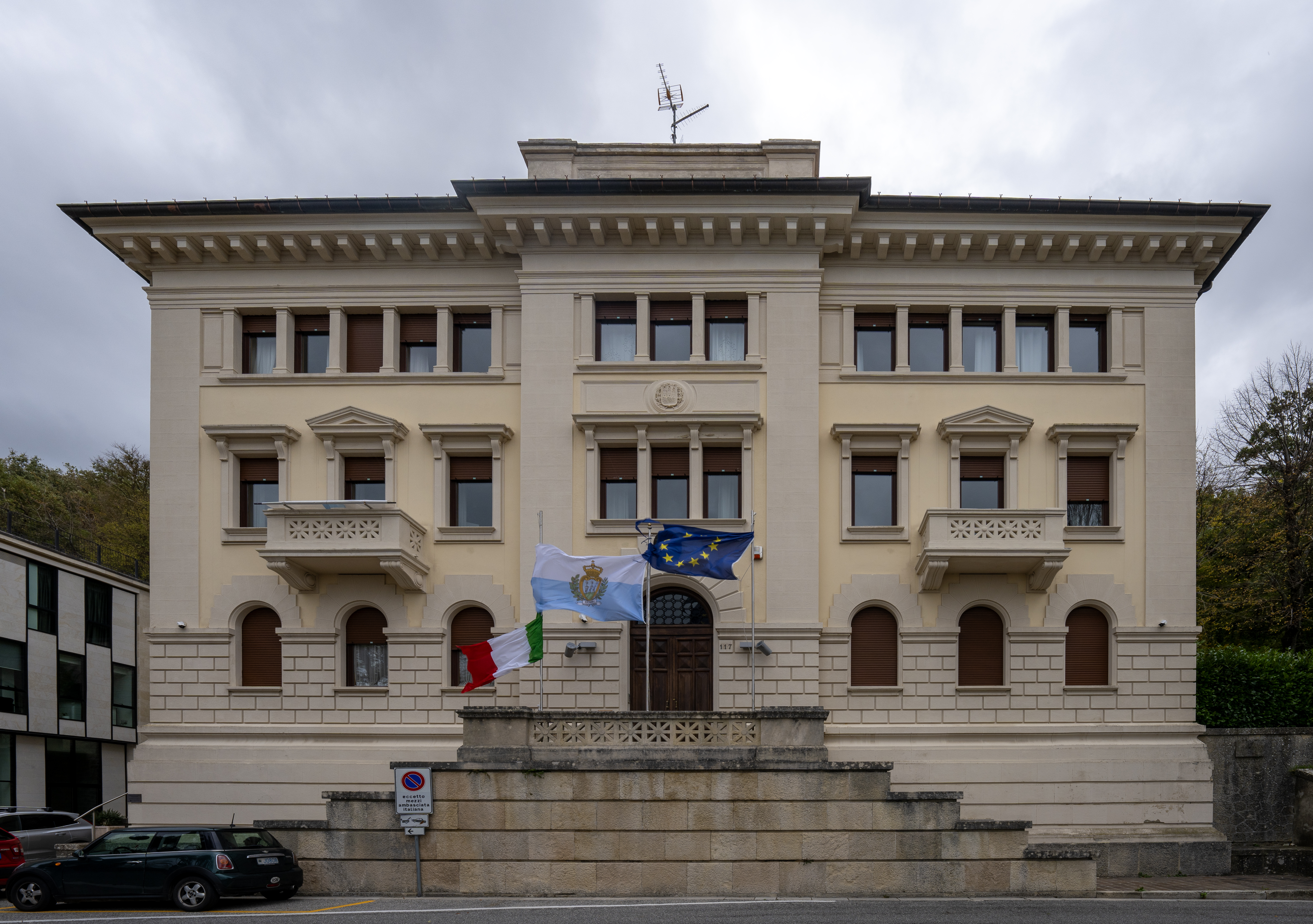
Embassy of Italy in the City of San Marino.

Italy and San Marino have had diplomatic relations since Italian unification. San Marino is entirely surrounded by Italy. Bilateral relations between Italy and San Marino have gone through various phases and have their official beginning after the Unification of Italy proclaimed in the Subalpine Parliament by Vittorio Emanuele II on 17 March 1861.

== History ==
=== Beginnings of the relationship ===
Shortly after the proclamation of the Kingdom of Italy in Turin, on 22 March 1862, the Italian-San Marino Treaty was signed between the President of the Italian council Urbano Rattazzi and the Sammarinese Captains Regent Melchiorre Filippi and Domenico Fattori.

In 1865 the first economic treaty was signed between Italy and San Marino, at which time determination was made that the Italian government would mint the Sammarinese lira. A further treaty in 1877 determined that Italy would also print San Marino's stamps.

In 1915 many San Marino volunteers participated in the First World War to ensure that Italy obtained Arbe, the then Austro-Hungarian island off the coast of Dalmatia where the founder and namesake of San Marino, Saint Marinus, was born. That same year, the Italian Red Cross founded the San Marino section, which participated in the First World War and then give rise to the San Marino Red Cross in 1949.

=== San Marino and Fascist Italy ===
In 1921, Italy sent the Carabinieri to San Marino for the establishment of the Gendarmerie. After the advent of Mussolini, they became a tool to prevent San Marino from becoming a refuge for Italian anti-fascists. The Carabinieri left San Marino only in 1936.

Due to the increasingly present Italian influence during the reign of the Fascist regime, the Fascist Party of San Marino was founded in 1922, headed by Giuliano Gozi. The party controlled public life in San Marino until the fall of the National Fascist Party in Italy.

Thanks to an agreement with fascist Italy, after the treaty between San Marino and Italy was signed in 1927, the Rimini-San Marino railway was built between 1927 and 1932.

With the fall of Mussolini on 25 July 1943, after only 3 days the San Marino Fascist Party of Giuliano Gozi was dissolved and the San Marino fascists were tried.

=== During the Invasion of the Italian Peninsula (1943–1945) ===
In January 1944 the fascists in San Marino, thanks to the support of Mussolini, founded the Republican Fascio of San Marino and took power until August of the same year.

San Marino remained neutral during the war and hosted over 100,000 Italian refugees, mainly from the Marche and Romagna.

Mussolini himself assured the captains regent that San Marino would not be invaded.

The war in Italy led to the Allied bombing of San Marino, where 63 Sammarinese citizens died, as well as the Battle of San Marino, where Allied and German forces clashed.

=== During the Cold War ===
After the return of democracy to Italy and San Marino in 1945, the San Marino Communist Party won the elections together with the San Marino Socialist Party. Countries such as the United States and Italy, alarmed by the only Western country under Communist and Socialist leadership, sought to finance the opposition forces that led to the Rovereta affair that took place on the border between Italy and San Marino.

In 1951, the Italian interior minister Mario Scelba had imposed a police blockade in San Marino to force it to close the newly-opened casino. The blockade lasted two years. The tension ended with the stipulation of the agreements of 1953, with which San Marino renounced both the gambling house and the system of a radio or television broadcaster.

In September 1958 the anti-communist opposition of San Marino, after having resigned en masse to avoid the election of the regent captains and the financial support of Italy and the United States, withdrew in Rovereta in a disused industrial plant bordering on three sides by 'Italy forming a provisional government formed by an executive committee, Immediately afterwards Italy surrounded the plant with the carabinieri and at the same time recognized the executive committee as a legitimate San Marino government, even if in the meantime arms arrived from Italy to all the forces in opposition.

On 11 October the captains regent recognized the provisional government of Rovereta as the only legitimate government of San Marino and the one recognized by Italy. Immediately afterwards the executive committee moved to San Marino City.

Furthermore, the same day the Voluntary Militia Corps was dissolved, as they feared the armed intervention of the Provisional Government supported by Italian soldiers.

San Marino was led until the end of the Cold War by anti-communist forces with a foreign policy close to Italy and the United States which led to the construction of the Rimini-San Marino highway; the works began on 10 August 1959, and it was inaugurated in the presence of the President of the Italian Republic Giuseppe Saragat on 25 November 1965, who met the Captains Regent Alvaro Casali and Pietro Reffi at the Palazzo Pubblico.

Furthermore, from 1962 to 1984, 30 carabinieri were sent, then reduced to 21 to set up an investigative and judicial police unit.

On 20 October 1984, the President of the Republic Sandro Pertini met the newly elected Captains Regent Marino Bollini and Giuseppe Amici.

=== Recent relations ===
On 11 and 12 June 1990 the President of the Republic Francesco Cossiga met the Captains Regent Adalmiro Bartolini and Ottaviano Rossi.

In August 1991, thanks to an agreement signed between RAI and the San Marino government with the mediation of the Italian government, San Marino public television was created. The broadcaster was owned 50% by the San Marino government and the remaining 50% by the Italian radio and television broadcaster.

Thanks to the monetary treaty in force since 1985, a treaty was signed between Italy and San Marino for the introduction of the euro and the inclusion of San Marino in the Eurozone.

Unresolved problems between Italy and San Marino include the status of the 6,000 Italian migrant workers in relation to the lack of an agreement between the two states and the introduction of a San Marino tax levy on frontier workers of 200 euro on 12 January 2011, the question had reached the Foreign Affairs Committee of the Chamber of Deputies on 23 February and on 16 February it provoked a parliamentary question by the Minister of Finances Giulio Tremonti.

Furthermore, San Marino is considered a tax haven by Italy, leading to disagreements between the two states. In Pianacci di Fiorentino on 25 March 2010, two plainclothes agents of the Guardia di Finanza were stopped by the Gendarmerie, who were stopped and then accompanied by the Gendarmerie to Customs, where they were finally handed over to the Italian authorities. On 14 February 2011, the Italian prosecutors investigated all 19 judges of San Marino for "fictitious residence", but as San Marino law provides that they are foreigners, their position was then removed by the prosecutor of Rimini. The decision to investigate the San Marino judges was judged by the San Marino government as a decision that "undermines the foundations of the Republic"

Tensions arose due to the search of the San Marino Consulate of Rimini by the Guardia di Finanza on 21 July 2009, to look for information on a domiciled person in the consulate. The search was defined by the San Marino government as "an unjustified and disrespectful act of a sovereign state" and led to formal protests to the Italian foreign minister Franco Frattini, while the San Marino court was accused by the Italian authorities of not collaborating with Italy.

Furthermore, the State Congress of San Marino sent a warning to the Italian ambassador in San Marino on 12 May 2009 to formally protest RAI, the Financial Police, and the program Report by Milena Gabanelli, which aired an episode on Rai 3 dedicated to San Marino, the content of which was defined by the Secretary of State for Finance, Gabriele Gatti, "negative and misleading for San Marino".

== Presidents of the Italian Republic who visited San Marino ==
To date, four out of eleven presidents of the Italian Republic have visited San Marino:

- Giuseppe Saragat on 25 November 1965.
- Sandro Pertini on 20 October 1984.
- Francesco Cossiga on 11 and 12 June 1990.
- Giorgio Napolitano on 13 June 2014.
- Sergio Mattarella on 6 December 2023.

== Trespassing of the Italian Armed Forces in San Marino ==
Sometimes Italian police or military forces have erroneously trespassed into San Marino, which has always made formal protests against the Italian government, the trespasses occurred:

- 25 March 2010: a van with two plainclothes soldiers from the Guardia di Finanza of the Gruppo Sportivi Fiamme Gialle departed from Trentino and headed for Rome crosses into the Republic and is taken back after investigations by the Gendarmerie to the border of Dogana.
- 8 May 2010: a convoy of five vehicles Iveco VM 90 of the "Serenissima" lagoon regiment with about thirty soldiers in uniform left from Venice and headed to the military polygon of Carpegna (PU) was stopped at Fiorina and after the investigations was escorted by two patrols of the Gendarmerie to the state border of Galazzano.
- 10 May 2010: a Fiat Ducato of the Italian Army carrying a soldier and a civilian from Caserta crosses the Republic and is stopped for investigations by Guardia di Rocca and from the Gendarmerie, the soldier states that he had to go to the Republic for an inspection.
- 26 January 2011: A military van with the Aeronautica Militare section of Bari coming from Rimini with five plainclothes soldiers aboard the vehicle visiting for tourist purposes is stopped just after crossing the border at Dogana, stopped after the junction for the Centro Atlante by the Guardia di Rocca that guards the border. being aware of the border and not having the necessary permits to enter the Republic they had to go back.
- 2 February 2011: a car from the Navy, and a van with a civilian license plate carrying two soldiers from the Air Force, two of the Navy, one bersagliere departed from Rome and headed north for a mission is stopped in the Republic, the vehicles are stopped in Serravalle and taken back from Guardia di Rocca to the border of Customs
- 6 December 2012: four vehicles of the Italian Army returning from the shooting range of Carpegna (PU) are stopped in Domagnano by the Guardia di Rocca and accompanied to the border of Customs.

In 2010 the then Secretary of State for Foreign and Political Affairs Antonella Mularoni defined the trespassing as "serious facts" and said that "the people of the Titan are fed up with external harassment".

== Diplomatic missions of San Marino in Italy ==
- Italy
  - Rome (Embassy)
  - Bari (Consulate)
  - Florence (Consulate)
  - Genoa (Consulate)
  - Milan (Consulate)
  - Naples (Consulate)
  - Ravenna (Consulate)
  - Rimini (Consulate)
  - Turin (Consulate)
  - Venice (Consulate)

== Diplomatic missions of Italy in San Marino ==
The Embassy of Italy is located in Viale Antonio Onofri in the City of San Marino.

== See also ==
- Italy-San Marino border
- Foreign relations of Italy
- Foreign relations of San Marino
- San Marino–European Union relations
