= Community preference =

Former principle of EU governance

Community preference was a concept in the European Union and its predecessor organisation the European Communities in which all the member states would be encouraged by the Institutions of the European Union and the Treaties of the European Union to give priority preference to all goods, trade, services, agricultural products and people from their fellow EU member states over all goods, trade, services and people from non-EU countries. Proponents argued that this would add to the benefits of EU membership by encouraging the member states to trade with each other rather than to trade with non-EU countries who are outside the bloc. It would serve as an integral part of the freedom of movement for workers in the European Union as well as the European Single Market and the European Union Customs Union.

Community preference would not apply to countries of the European Free Trade Association even though they were members of the European Single Market and observed freedom of movement rules.

It was one of the founding principles of the establishment of the European Communities (which would later become the European Union) when the Treaty of Rome was signed in 1958. But in a judgment in 1994 Greece v Council, Case C-353/92, the European Court of Justice (ECJ) confirmed that Community preference was not a principle of EU law. Its legal basis, Article 44 of the Treaty of Rome, was repealed by the 1997 Amsterdam Treaty.

== See also ==
- European Union Single Market
- European Union Customs Union
- Common Agricultural Policy
- Common Fisheries Policy
