= Holy See–Monaco relations =

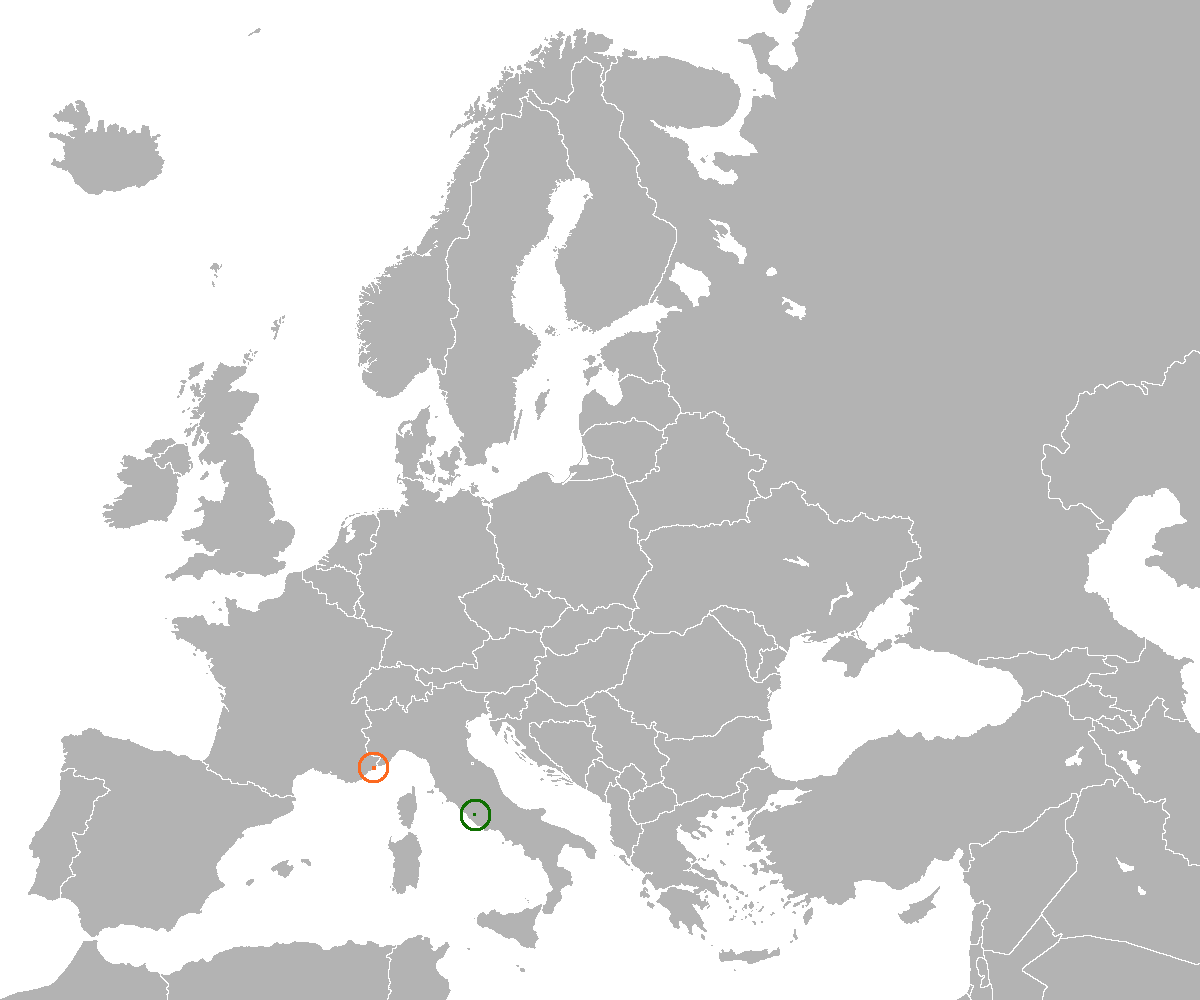
- Holy See: Monaco

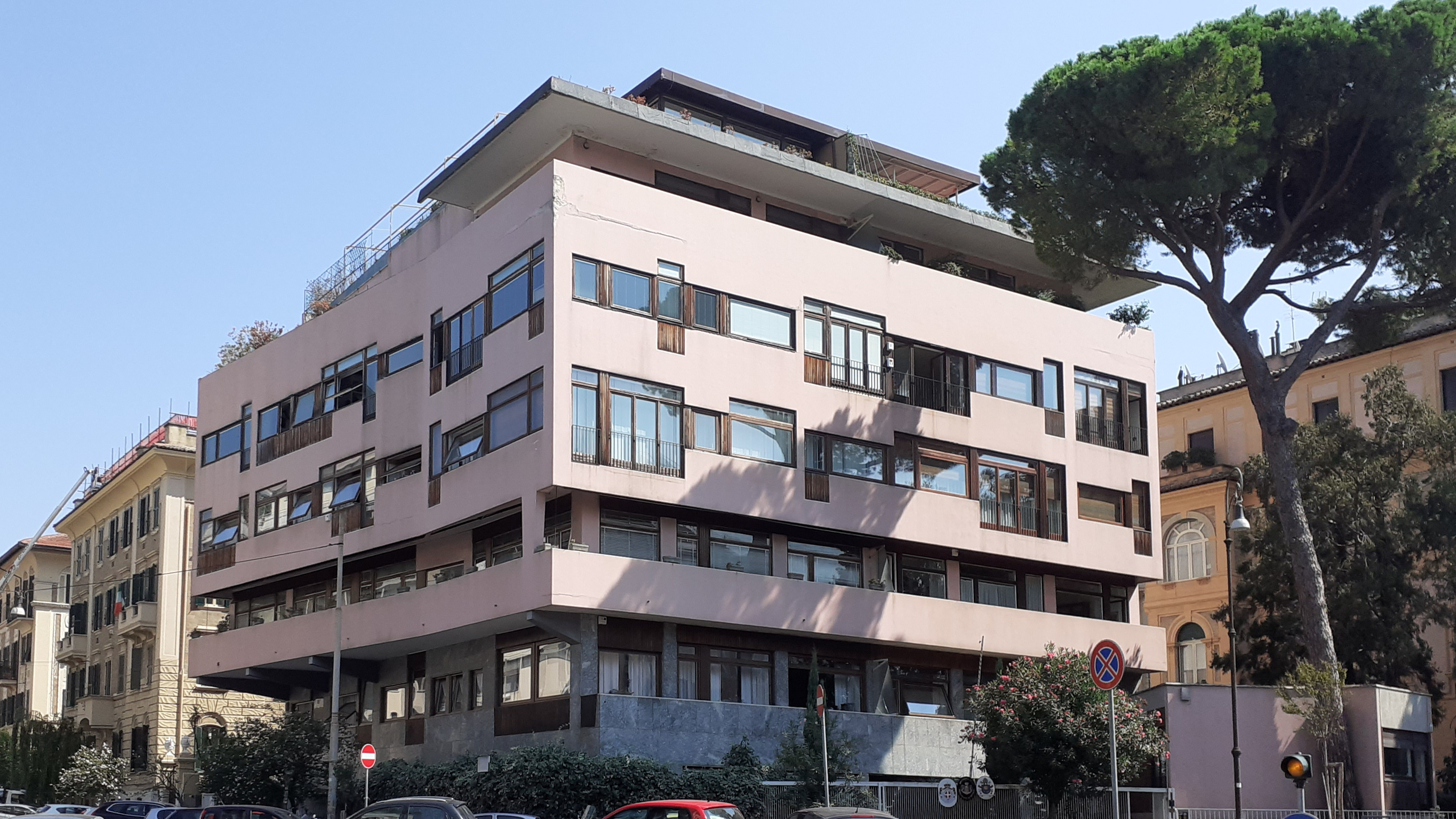
Embassy of Monaco to the Holy See in Rome

Holy See–Monaco relations are bilateral relations between the Principality of Monaco and the Holy See. The principal Monégasque official is Ambassador Claude Giordan, who officially started at his position in November 2015. The Holy See is represented by its Apostolic Nuncio, Archbishop Antonio Arcari, who assumed office on May 25, 2019. The Embassy of Monaco to the Holy See is located in Rome, on Largo Spinelli. The Apostolic Nunciature to Monaco is non-residing as the nuncio currently resides in Rome.

== History ==
=== Monaco of the Guelphs: the founding of a papist dynasty ===
The coat of arms of the Prince of Monaco represent his ancestor, François Grimaldi, dressing up as a Franciscan friar to take the fortress of Monaco overnight. Beneath is written his motto: Deo juvante, Latin for "with the grace of God".

It is part of Monaco's generally accepted cultural and political history that Monaco and the Holy See have maintained a diplomatic friendship bound by the Catholic faith since the founding of the Principality. Relations between Monaco and the Papal States begin with the bull of Pope Innocent IV in 1247, which confirms the possession at the Abbey of Saint-Pons in Nice of the chapel dedicated to Saint Martin, near the Château Neuf, on the Rock of Monaco. The same year, the Pope authorized the erection of another chapel reserved for the Genoese dedicated to Saint John the Baptist.

When the Guelphs who supported the Pope against the Ghibellines of the Empire were expelled from Genoa, it is then that the fortress of Monaco was taken overnight on January 8, 1297 with François Grimaldi disguising himself off as a Franciscan friar.

When the Great Western Schism broke out, Rainier first remained in the obedience of Urban VI, elected in Rome; but it was not long before he joined the Pope of Avignon, Clement VII, in 1378.

In 1405 following the dedition of Nice to Savoy, during his Avignon expedition to Genoa and Pisa, antipope Benedict XIII was the first Pope to go to Monaco, and during his halt, the Pope stayed in the southwest wing of the Prince's Palace that already existed in its current form at the end of the 14th century and where the royal apartments are now.

In 1444, Jean Grimaldi de Beuil concluded a treaty with Pope Eugene IV to oppose the condottiere Franesco Sforza.

=== Pontifical recognition of Monegasque autonomy in 1524 ===
Between the fourteenth century and the sixteenth century, successive Popes forged special links with Monaco, as evidenced by an epistolary relationship, a convention, two bulls and a brief. The reign of Lord-Bishop Augustine Grimaldi marked a singular period for Monaco between 1523 and 1532. Augustine Grimaldi, who pledged allegiance to Emperor Charles V, was then Lord of Monaco and Bishop of Grasse: he was adviser and chaplain to the king and extraordinary adviser to the Parliament of Provence and in 1517 he attended the Fifth Lateran Council.

During his reign, a papal bull dated February 19, 1524 from Pope Clement VII expressly consecrated the autonomy of Monaco with "its Lord not recognizing any superior from the temporal point of view."

=== The role of Monaco in Vatican diplomacy: Louis I and the Spanish succession (1699–1701) ===
In April 1698, Louis I of Monaco was chosen as King Louis XIV's ambassador to the Holy See. In the context of the difficult Bourbon claim to the Spanish throne in the absence of posterity from Charles II of Spain, this mission was decisive for the defense of the claims of the House of Bourbon against that of the Habsburgs. To carry out his mission, Louis deployed in his embassy at the Corsini Palace a royal splendor that has remained legendary. Innocent XII was finally favorable to the rights of the House of Bourbon, and allowed Philip, Duke of Anjou to take over the throne of Spain, thus causing a diplomatic victory for Louis Grimaldi.

=== Two popes in Monaco: Pius VI in a coffin and Pius VII during his lifetime (1802–1814) ===
On February 12, 1802, the ship carrying the remains of Pope Pius VI who died in Valence as a prisoner of the French Directory, was forced by a storm to make a stopover in Monaco. But on January 11, 1814, it was a living Pope Pius VII returning from his captivity at Fontainebleau who passed through La Turbie and gave the locals of Monaco the opportunity to come cheer him in crowds along the road.

=== Erection of a local Church in Monaco: the Quemadmodum sollicitus bull of 1886 ===
After the capture of Rome in 1870, the Principality retained its support for the spiritual and political sovereignty of the Pope. The ambition of Charles III was also to make the Principality more autonomous vis-à-vis the interference of the Bishop of Nice on which Monaco then depended. The bull Quemadmodum sollicitus of March 15, 1886, under the pontificate of Leo XIII, then made the Principality a diocese under the direct authority of Rome. On September 28, 1887, a sovereign ordinance made state law the provisions of the said bull, which recalls the Concordat of Bologna through the role given to the Prince in the appointment of bishops. Indeed, the agreement in force until 1981 was a unique case in the process of appointing bishops in which the Prince had the right to present three suitable candidates so that the Pope could make the appointment of one of them. This bull thus marked the establishment of official diplomatic relations between Monaco and the Holy See, whilst the Papal States had just been invaded by the nationalist troops of Giuseppe Garibaldi and well before the Lateran Treaty of 1929 which recognized the sovereignty of the Holy See over the Vatican City State. In 1888, in thanksgiving for this agreement, the Principality offered a crux gemmata adorned with precious stones and rubies to Pope Leo XIII, the symbolism of which is quite explicit. Indeed, a first medallion on the left arm of this cross represents Pope Leo the Great driving back Attila after he had crossed the Alps with his hords of Huns and invaded Italy, a few centuries before Garibaldi, and on a medallion at the foot of the cross is represented Monsignor Charles Theuret, first bishop of Monaco, prostrate at the feet of Leo XIII, demonstrating the irrevocable attachment of the Principality of Monaco to the See of Peter.

=== Elevation to the rank of archdiocese: the Conventio inter Apostolicam sedem and Principatum monoecum of 1981 ===
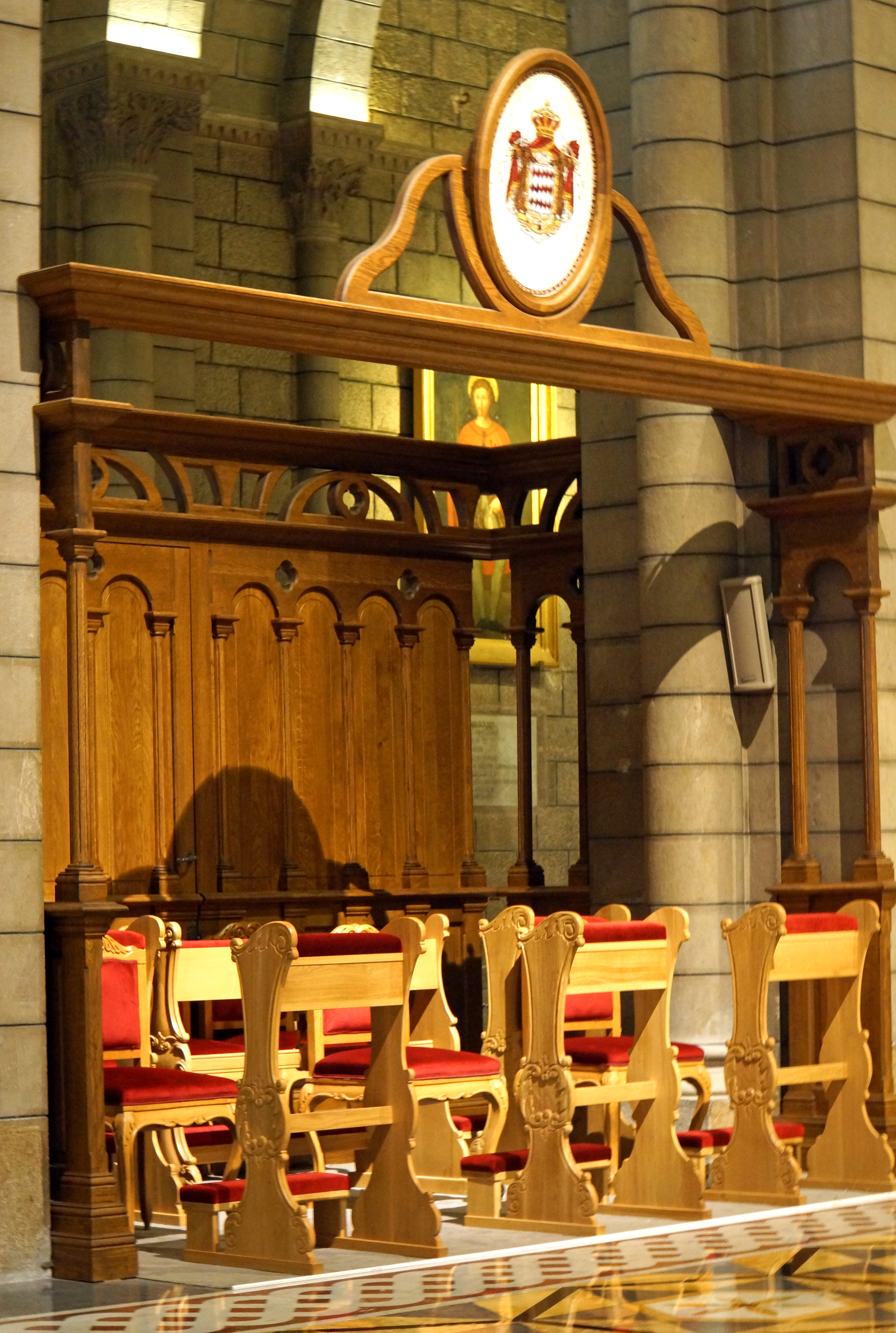
Lodge of the Prince in the choir of the cathedral of Monaco.

Prince Rainier III and Princess Grace were received at the Vatican by Pope Pius XII in 1957, by Pope John XXIII in 1959 and by Pope Paul VI in 1974.

On July 25, 1981, in Vatican City, an agreement was signed between the Holy See and the Principality of Monaco, Conventio inter apostolicam sedem et principatum monoecum which can be considered as a concordat between these two countries. The Holy See was represented there by Archbishop Achille Silvestrini, secretary of the Council for Public Affairs of the Holy See. As for the Principality of Monaco, it was through César Charles Solamito, Ambassador Extraordinary of the Prince of Monaco. By virtue of this agreement, the Prince renounced his right of appointment in terna: appointing the archbishop was henceforth the exclusive competence of the apostolic see after consultation with the Prince. This new provision was taken with a view to conforming the bull Quemadmodum sollicitus to the orientations given by the Second Vatican Council: it was a question of adjusting an incongruity of canon law while preserving the specificity of the relationship between the Holy See and Monaco due to their history and their status as microstates.

In exchange, on July 30, 1981, through the papal bull entitled Apostolica haec, Pope John Paul II raised the episcopal see of Monaco to the dignity of archiepiscopal see.

=== Establishment of a Monaco Embassy to the Holy See in 1981 ===
On May 11, 1982, following the new convention and by sovereign ordinance of Prince Rainier III, the statute of ecclesiastics in the archdiocese of Monaco was updated. On June 15, 1982, the Principality of Monaco and the Holy See agreed to elevate the Legation of Monaco to the rank of Embassy, within the framework of the specific relations uniting the Holy See and the Principality. On December 10, 1982, the first Ambassador Extraordinary and Plenipotentiary, César Solamito, presented his credentials to the Pope.

In 1997, Prince Rainier III, Crown Prince Albert and Princess Caroline were received in private audience by Pope John Paul II.

In 2005, the young Prince Albert II of Monaco made his first public appearance in his new role at the funeral of John Paul II.

=== The presence of a nuncio in Monaco since 2006: a sign of a long-standing relationship ===
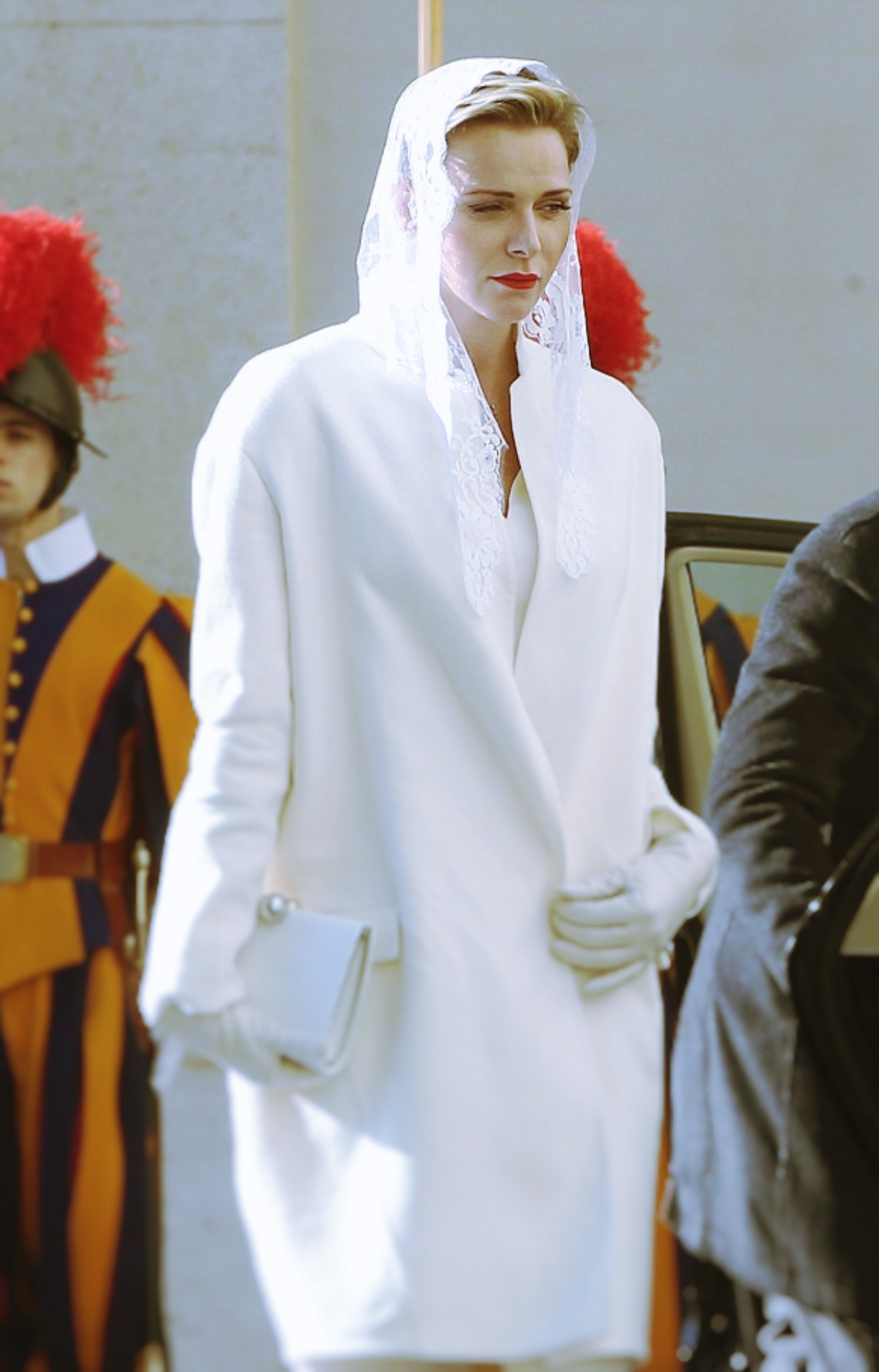
Princess Charlene, in formal attire to meet Pope Benedict XVI under the privilège du blanc.

In 2005, accompanied by his chief of staff Jean-Luc Allavena and the chaplain of the palace, Canon César Penzo, Prince Albert went to Rome to discuss the potential strengthening of links between Monaco and the Holy See, and offered to the sovereign pontiff a bronze statue of Sainte Dévote, created by Cyril de La Patellière. On July 12, 2006, Pope Benedict XVI appointed for the first time an apostolic nuncio to the Sovereign Prince and the Principality of Monaco. On September 26, 2006, Prince Albert II received at the Palace the letters of credence of Monsignor André Dupuy, Extraordinary Apostolic Nuncio and Plenipotentiary of the Holy See.

In 2009, Prince Albert II was again received by Pope Benedict XVI.

On January 12, 2013, Prince Albert II presented his new wife Charlene, dressed in the tradition of the privilège du blanc, to Pope Benedict XVI during a private audience at the Vatican. From 2013, the Ambassador of the Prince of Monaco to the Holy See, Jean-Claude Michel, also became the dean of the diplomatic corps accredited to the Holy See until the appointment in November 2015 of a new ambassador, Claude Giordan.

On May 13, 2014 Prince Albert II and Princess Charlene, in the presence of Archbishop Bernard Barsi and the Mayor of Monaco, Georges Marsan, inaugurated an alley in homage to "Saint John Paul II" along the Cathedral of Our Lady Immaculate.

The royal couple last met Pope Francis on July 20, 2022.

Pope Leo XIV made a nine-hour visit to Monaco on 28 March 2026.

== Diplomatic cooperation ==
=== Service of the common good ===
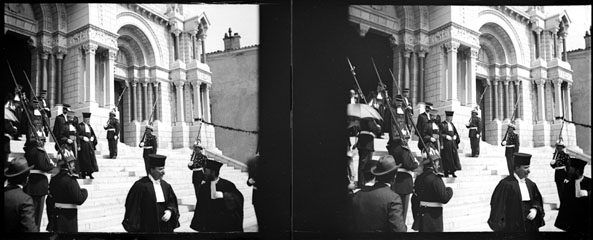
Judges of the Supreme Court exiting the cathedral after the Easter Mass, Monaco, in April 1906. The judicial year in Monaco always begins with a "Red Mass" in honor of the Holy Spirit in which the entire legal body of the Principality participates.

During a private audience of the National Council of Monaco on February 2, 2019, Pope Francis recalled the commitment of the Holy See and the Vatican to work together for the service of the common good in these terms:

Monegasques can rely on the founding values of the Principality, inspired by the Gospel and its message of love.

— Pope Francis, Speech to the Delegation of the National Council of the Principality of Monaco

=== Health ===
The Vatican and Monaco are committed to promote the dignity of health workers. In this sense, in January 2016, Princess Charlene addressed a conference at the Vatican on global health issues, including her support of drowning prevention. A collaboration exists between the Centre scenitifique de Monaco and the Bambino Gesù Pediatric Hospital in the Vatican to jointly fight against pediatric hematological and oncological diseases. Monaco and the Holy See also have the same position regarding abortion, insofar as the two States defend the life of the pregnant mother and the unborn child on an equal basis.

=== Sports: the Monaco-Vatican charity game ===
Since 2011, Monaco and the Holy See have opposed each other in a friendly soccer game with the aim of promoting friendship between the two countries and the Christian values of sport.

== Common characteristics ==
The privileged relationship between Monaco and the Holy See is based on a long common history, as well as many characteristics that both States have in common.

=== Two sovereign micro-states ===
Euro coins bearing the effigy of the respective sovereigns of Monaco and the Vatican City State

The Vatican City State and the Principality of Monaco are two micro-states: they are the two smallest countries in the world, having an area of respectively 0.44 km2 and 2 km2. Although having lost the largest part of their historic territory, the two States have nevertheless managed to maintain their sovereignty.

In fact, while the Holy See is recognized by the United Nations as a permanent observer, Monaco did not become a full member of the international organization until 1993.

Although they do not have their own currency, Monaco and the Holy See have obtained from the European Union the power to use euros bearing their own effigy as current currency.

=== Two Catholic States ===
Monaco, along with the Republic of Malta, are the only two states in the world whose official religion is Catholicism. While it is in essence the religion of the Vatican City State, Catholicism is the official religion of the Principality under the Constitution of Monaco. Article 9 of the Monegasque Constitution, dated 17 December 1962, and modified in 2002, establishes the Catholic religion as the official religion of the sovereign state, which is a Catholic constitutional monarchy ruled by the Catholic Grimaldi dynasty.

== Distinctions and privilege ==
=== The privilege of white ===
The Princess of Monaco enjoys the privilège du blanc (in Italian: privilegio del bianco), a special prerogative used by Catholic queens, princesses and duchesses during their audiences with the Pope, by which they are authorized to wear white garments and mantillas, a color reserved for the sovereign Pontiff.

=== Pontifical awards ===
On 20 March 1930, Pope Pius XI conferred the Pro Ecclesia et Pontefice decoration on Hereditary Princess Charlotte and the Grand Cross of the Order of Pius IX on Prince Pierre.

Prince Rainier III was a knight of the Pontifical Order of the Golden Spur.

== See also ==
- Foreign relations of Monaco
- Multilateral foreign policy of the Holy See
