= 2013 San Marino referendum =

Two referendums were held in San Marino on 20 October 2013. Voters were asked whether they approved of measures to tie salary increase to inflation and whether the country should submit an application to join the European Union. Although both proposals had a majority vote in favour, neither reached the quorum of 32% of eligible voters in favour (10,657 voters), resulting in both proposals being rejected.

== Background ==
Referendums in San Marino require 32% of eligible voters to vote yes to pass. People who are citizens of San Marino but live abroad cannot vote.

The referendum question on salaries was organised by the Democratic Confederation of San Marino Workers and proposed that salaries would be revalued on 1 January at the same rate as the Government's official inflation figure.

While San Marino is not a part of the European Union the two share close diplomatic ties. San Marino is a member of the European Union's European Union Customs Union and European Environment Agency, as well as using the Euro as its official currency. The European Union did not formally offer membership to San Marino, instead it was listed due to a citizen helmed proposal. The European Commission had previously issued a report stating that microstates should not join the European Union.

== Results ==
The election was held on October 20, 2013. While both proposals both received over fifty percent of the vote due to low voter turnout neither reached the quorum of 32% of eligible voters in favour, resulting in both being rejected. The rejection of the European Union question was attributed to the amount of Sammarinese living abroad, who would be affected by it, being ineligible to vote.

Question	For		Against		Invalid/ blank	Total votes	Registered voters	Turnout	Result	Ref.
Question	Votes	%	Votes	%	Invalid/ blank	Total votes	Registered voters	Turnout	Result	Ref.
European Union membership	6,732	50.28	6,657	49.72	1,059	14,448	33,303	43.38	Rejected due to lack of quorum in favour.	
Salary increases	10,025	73.12	3,685	26.88	712	14,422	33,303	43.31	Rejected due to lack of quorum in favour.	
