= Italy-San Marino border =

International border between Italy and San Marino

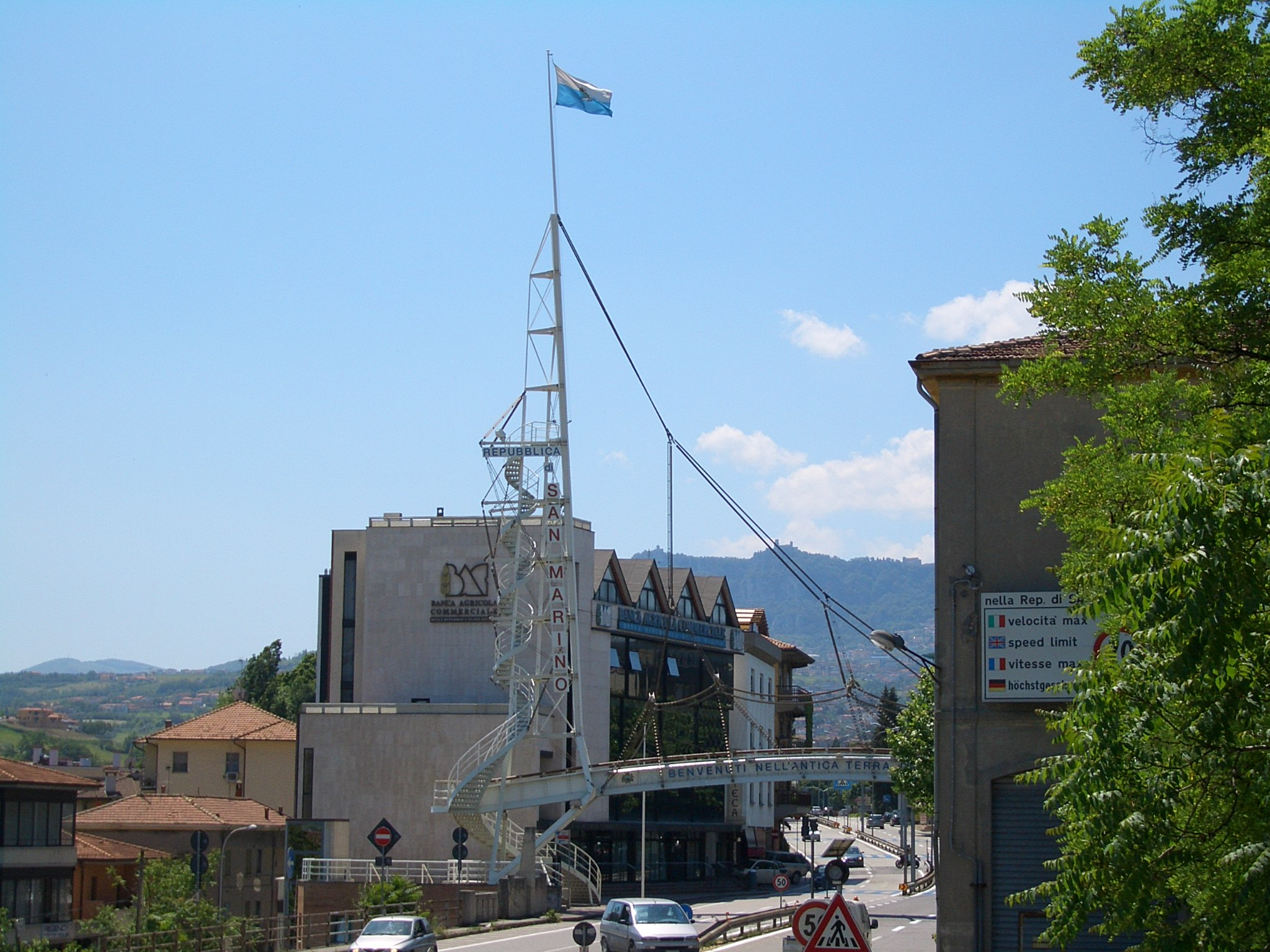
- Entering the Republic of San Marino from Italy at Dogana.

Characteristics
- Entities: Italy San Marino
- Length: 39 km (24 mi)
- Enclave and exclaves: The Republic of San Marino in its entirety is an enclave within Italy.

History
- Established: 3 September 301 (traditional); Founded by Saint Marinus
- Current shape: 27 June 1463; Gifted from the Papal States by Pope Pius II

The Italy-San Marino border is 39 km (24 mi) long. San Marino is entirely landlocked within Italy. At the San Marino border there are no formalities with Italy. However, at the tourist office visitors can purchase officially cancelled souvenir stamps for their passports.

Two Italian regions border San Marino:

- Emilia-Romagna to the northeast, west, and north
- Le Marche to the south

All nine Castelli of San Marino border Italy:

- City of San Marino
- Borgo Maggiore
- Acquaviva
- Chiesanuova
- Domagnano
- Faetano
- Fiorentino
- Montegiardino
- Serravalle

== Features ==
Rather than walls, the border often follows natural geographical features, particularly riverbeds that divide the San Marino from the Italy.

- San Marino River
- Marano River
- Ausa River

== Border crossings ==
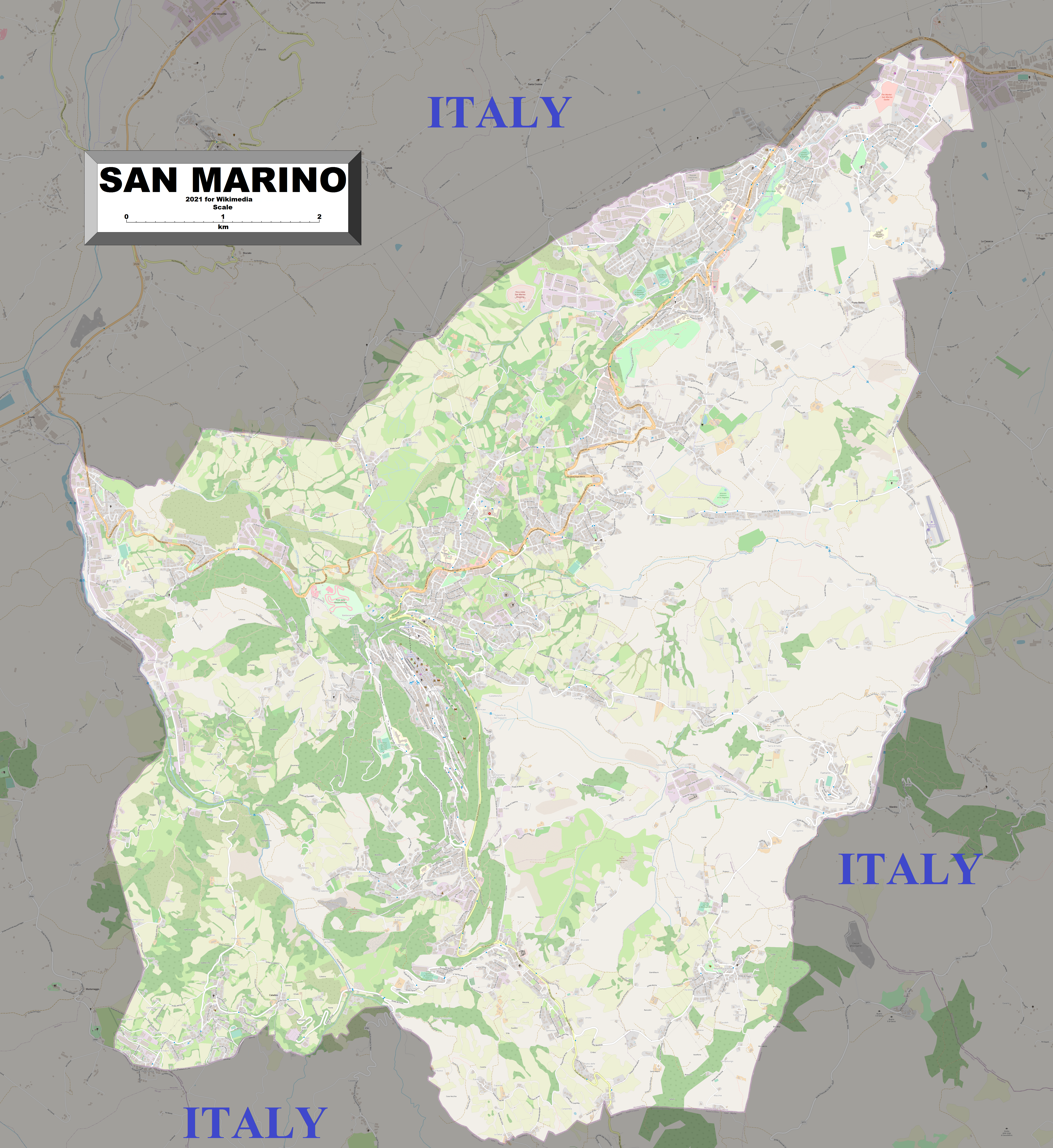
Enlargeable, detailed map of San Marino.

=== Road ===
The major road crossings between the two countries from north to south are:

- Intersection at the northern end of Strada Rovereta
- San Marino Highway/SS72 (Italy)
- Via Rivo Fontanelle
- Strada del Marano
- Via Saline/SP131(Italy)
- Strada Fontescara
- Strada Della Serra

=== Rail ===
The Rimini–San Marino railway was a 31.5-kilometre (19.6-mile) electrified narrow-gauge railway that connected Rimini with the City of San Marino.

== History ==
The territory of San Marino consisted only of Mount Titano until 1463. The nation became part of an alliance against Sigismondo Pandolfo Malatesta, the Lord of Rimini, who was defeated. The Pope Pius II gave the towns of Fiorentino, Montegiardino, and Serravalle to San Marino as a reward for being part of the alliance. Later, Faetano voluntarily joined the country, and the boundaries have remained the same ever since.

== See also ==
- Italian Peninsula
- Italy–San Marino relations
- Index of San Marino-related articles
