= San Marino–European Union relations =

European Union-San Marino relations
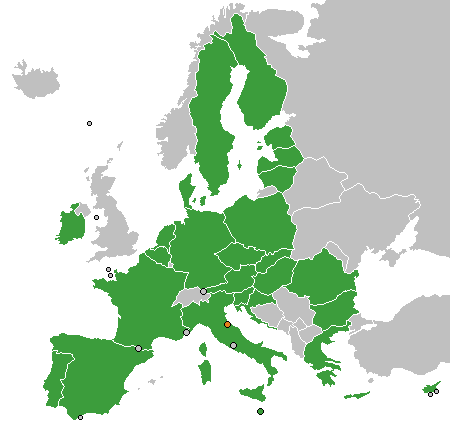
- European Union: San Marino

Relations between the Republic of San Marino and the European Union (EU) began in February 1983. San Marino is completely surrounded by one EU member state, Italy.

== Agreements ==
San Marino is not a party to the Schengen Agreement. However, it has an open border with the Schengen Area, although some random police checks are made. On 30 May 2024 the Council of the European Union authorised the opening of negotiations for an agreement between the European Union and San Marino in order to create a legal basis for the absence of border controls between the country and the Schengen Area. In September 2026, the Commission proposed to the Council to sign the finalized agreements on border controls with San Marino.

San Marino has had a customs union with the EU since 1991, which has included agricultural produce since 2002.

Via a monetary agreement, San Marino uses the euro as its sole currency (it previously used the Sammarinese lira, set at par with the Italian lira) and is allowed to mint a limited number of coins itself with their own design.

San Marino and the EU have also concluded an agreement on savings taxation.

=== Association Agreement ===
In November 2012, after the Council of the European Union had called for an evaluation of the EU's relations with the sovereign European microstates of Andorra, Monaco and San Marino, which they described as "fragmented", the European Commission published a report outlining options for their further integration into the EU. Unlike Liechtenstein, which is a member of the European Economic Area (EEA) via the European Free Trade Association (EFTA) and the Schengen Agreement, relations with these three states are based on a collection of agreements covering specific issues. The report examined four alternatives to the current situation: 1) a Sectoral Approach with separate agreements with each state covering an entire policy area, 2) a comprehensive, multilateral Framework Association Agreement (FAA) with the three states, 3) EEA membership, and 4) EU membership. The Commission argued that the sectoral approach did not address the major issues and was still needlessly complicated, while EU membership was dismissed in the near future because "the EU institutions are currently not adapted to the accession of such small-sized countries." The remaining options, EEA membership and a FAA with the states, were found to be viable and were recommended by the Commission. In response, the Council requested that negotiations with the three microstates on further integration continue, and that a report be prepared by the end of 2013 detailing the implications of the two viable alternatives and recommendations on how to proceed.

As EEA membership is currently only open to EFTA or EU members, the consent of existing EFTA member states is required for the microstates to join the EEA without becoming members of the EU. In 2011, Jonas Gahr Støre, the then Foreign Minister of Norway which is an EFTA member state, said that EFTA/EEA membership for the microstates was not the appropriate mechanism for their integration into the internal market due to their different requirements than large countries such as Norway, and suggested that a simplified association would be better suited for them. Espen Barth Eide, Støre's successor, responded to the Commission's report in late 2012 by questioning whether the microstates have sufficient administrative capabilities to meet the obligations of EEA membership. However, he stated that Norway was open to the possibility of EFTA membership for the microstates if they decide to submit an application, and that the country had not made a final decision on the matter. Pascal Schafhauser, the Counsellor of the Liechtenstein Mission to the EU, said that Liechtenstein, another EFTA member state, was willing to discuss EEA membership for the microstates provided their joining did not impede the functioning of the organization. However, he suggested that the option direct membership in the EEA for the microstates, outside of both the EFTA and the EU, should be given consideration.

On 18 November 2013 the EU Commission published their report which concluded that "the participation of the small-sized countries in the EEA is not judged to be a viable option at present due to the political and institutional reasons", but that Association Agreements were a more feasible mechanism to integrate the microstates into the internal market, preferably via a single multilateral agreement with all three states (Andorra, Monaco & San Marino). In December 2014 the Council of the European Union approved negotiations being launched on such an agreement, and they began in March 2015. Negotiations had been planned to be concluded by 2020.

In December 2023, the European Commission announced the conclusion of negotiations on a new Association Agreement between the EU and Andorra and San Marino; negotiations with Monaco had been suspended in September 2023 due to disputes over financial regulation. The Commission formally put forward a proposal to the Council of the European Union in April 2024 to adopt decisions approving that the agreement be signed and concluded. In December 2025 the Council of the European Union determined that the agreement consisted of mixed competencies, and so would require approval in each EU member state's respective parliaments. In July 2026, following Bulgaria’s withdrawal of its veto, the Council of the EU authorized the signing of the association agreements with Andorra and San Marino, which organises their participation in the single market (including the financial sector if some conditions are fullfilled).

The Association Agreement was signed on 19 October 2026.

== Potential accession of San Marino to the European Union ==
Countries that could join the European Union Current members Candidate countries Applicant / potential candidate countries Membership possible Membership not possible

As of 2006, the left-wing opposition Popular Alliance was in favour of joining the EU, while the ruling Sammarinese Christian Democratic Party opposed.

In 2010, the Parliament tasked the government to open negotiations for further integration with the European Union, and subsequently a technical group prepared a report on EU and EEA membership.

A campaign was launched in 2010 aiming to collect enough signatures to force a referendum on EU membership for San Marino. The Guarantor Board approved the referendum on 15 November 2010, and the referendum was set for 27 March 2011. However, after the government sent a letter to the President of the European Commission requesting "open negotiations aimed at achieving a greater integration of the Republic of San Marino at the European level" on 20 January 2011, the government argued that the referendum should be canceled since the question had been resolved, even though the letter did not request full membership in the EU for San Marino. The Guarantor Board accepted this argument and canceled the referendum on 24 February.

On 7 July 2011, the Grand and General Council rejected calls for an application for full EU membership, and instead approved an agenda that called for further negotiations on enhancing San Marino's integration with the EU, without excluding the possibility of membership in the future.

A second campaign also succeeded in collecting enough signatures for a referendum on EU membership. On 23 July 2013 the Captains Regent set the date of the referendum for 20 October 2013. Although a narrow majority of 50.3% voted in favour of membership, low turnout resulted in the quorum of 32% of registered voters voting in favour not being reached, so the proposal failed.

Political parties' stances towards membership application

Group	Party	Position	Ref.
Government	Sammarinese Christian Democratic Party	Neutral	
Government	RETE Movement	No	
Government	Socialist Party	Yes	
Government	Domani Motus Liberi	TBA	
Government	Party of Socialists and Democrats	Yes	
Government	Democratic Movement – San Marino Together	TBA	
Opposition	United Left	Yes	
Opposition	Civic 10	Yes	
Opposition	Future Republic	Yes	

== See also ==
- Foreign relations of San Marino
- Foreign relations of the European Union
- Italy–San Marino relations
- Microstates and the European Union
