= Israel–Monaco relations =

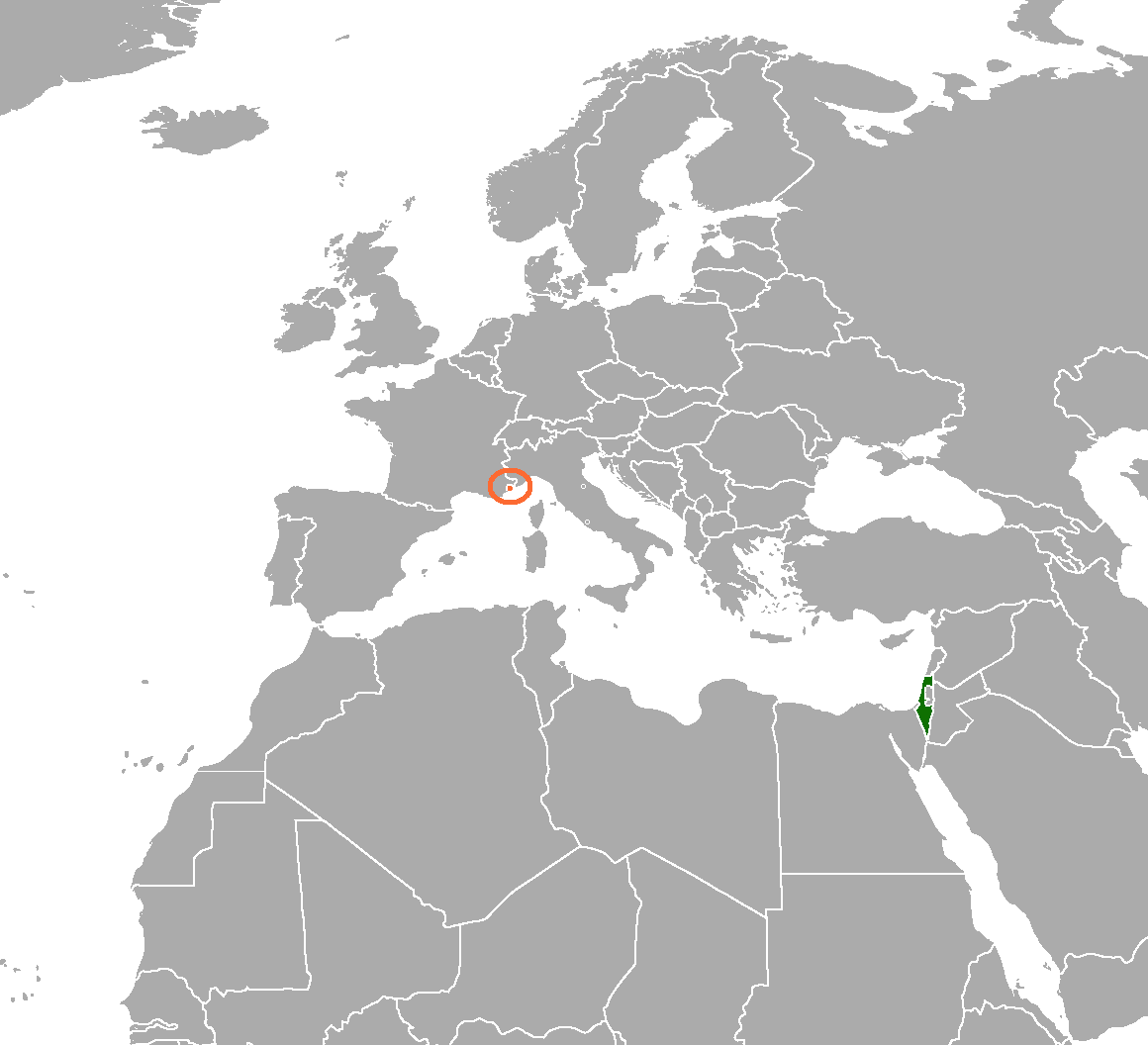
- Israel: Monaco

Israel–Monaco relations refer to bilateral ties between the State of Israel and Principality of Monaco. Israel is accredited to Monaco from its embassy in Paris, France, and has a consul in Monaco. Monaco has a consul resides in Ramat Gan.

== Overview ==
The State of Israel and the Principality of Monaco officially established their relations in 1964. Monaco recognizes both Israel and the PLO, the internationally recognized representative of Palestine. By 2020, Monaco had the highest ratio of Jews outside of Israel.

== Economic relations ==
The relations between Israel and Monaco are based on tourism. In 2012, Israel exported goods worth 1,000 USD.

== See also ==
- Foreign relations of Israel
- Foreign relations of Monaco
