= Monaco–United Kingdom relations =

- Monaco: United Kingdom

Diplomatic mission
- Embassy of Monaco, London: Embassy of the United Kingdom, Paris

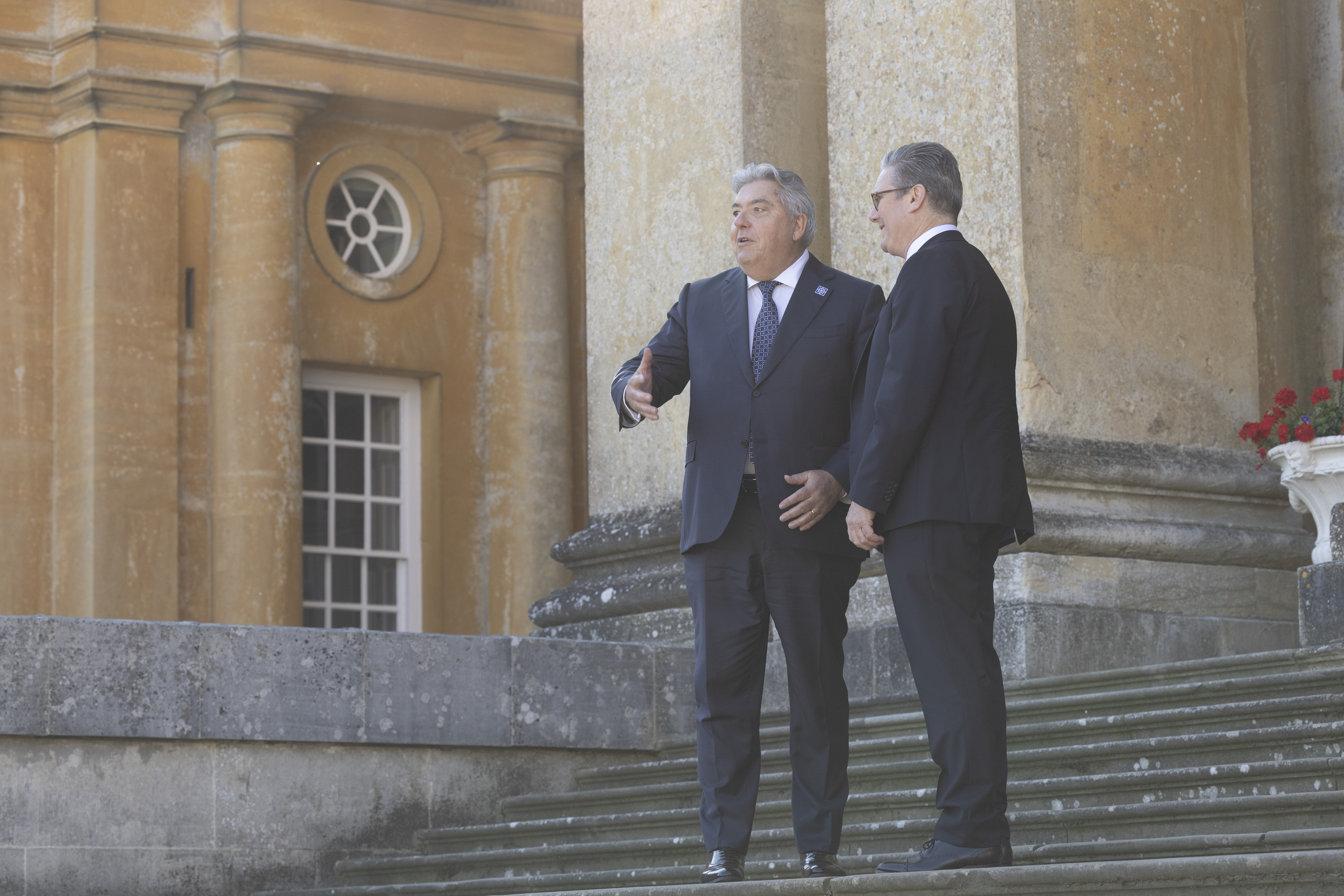
British Prime Minister Keir Starmer with Monégasque State Minister Pierre Dartout at a European Political Community summit on Blenheim Palace, July 2025.

Monaco–United Kingdom relations refer to the diplomatic, historical, economic, and cultural ties between the Principality of Monaco and the United Kingdom of Great Britain and Northern Ireland. The two countries established diplomatic relations on 21 September 2007.

Both countries share common membership of the Council of Europe, the European Court of Human Rights, the OSCE, and the United Nations. Bilaterally the two countries have a Tax Information Exchange Agreement.

== Demographics ==
Almost 15% of the population living and working in Monaco are British.

== Diplomatic missions ==
- Monaco maintains an embassy in London.
- The United Kingdom is not accredited to Monaco through an embassy; the UK develops relations through its embassy in Paris, France.

== See also ==
- Foreign relations of Monaco
- Foreign relations of the United Kingdom
