= Monaco–Russia relations =

- Monaco: Russia

Monaco–Russia relations (Russian: российско-монакские отношения, French: Relations entre Monaco et la Russie) is the bilateral relationship between the Principality of Monaco and the Russian Federation.

== History ==
Relations between the two countries date back to the reigns of Prince Charles III of Monaco and Tsar Alexander II of Russia. During this period the two nations signed numerous treaties and agreements, including the extradition of criminals, mutual legal assistance, recognition of the civil status of people and for medical aid. After the establishment of the Order of Saint-Charles in Monaco in 1858, Tsar Alexander II became the first member of a royal family to be bestowed the Monegasque award. In 1877, Charles III appointed Chevalier Jean Plancher as the Monegasque Consul in Saint Petersburg.

Following the Russian Revolution of 1917 relations between the two states were suspended. Prior to the admission of Monaco into the United Nations in 1993, the establishment of diplomatic relations with the Soviet Union was not a priority, however, the two states maintained contacts via the Soviet Embassy in Paris and the Embassy of France in Moscow.

== Russian Federation relations ==
=== Diplomatic relations ===
Monaco and the Russian Federation established consular relations in July 1996. In 2002, Prince Rainier III appointed Nikolai Orlov as Monaco's honorary consulate in Saint Petersburg, and Albert II travelled to the city to open the honorary consulate on 31 July 2003. On 13 April 2006, Russian president Vladimir Putin signed a presidential decree directing the Russian Ministry of Foreign Affairs to begin negotiations with their Monegasque counterparts with a view to establishing full diplomatic relations between the two states. Diplomatic relations between the two states were established on 11 July 2006 after the exchange of notes between the Russian and Monegasque embassies in Paris. On 16 March 2007, Aleksandr Avdeyev was appointed as Russian ambassador to Monaco, in concurrence with his posting as Ambassador of Russia to France. Diplomatic relations between the two states were established on 10 April 2007.

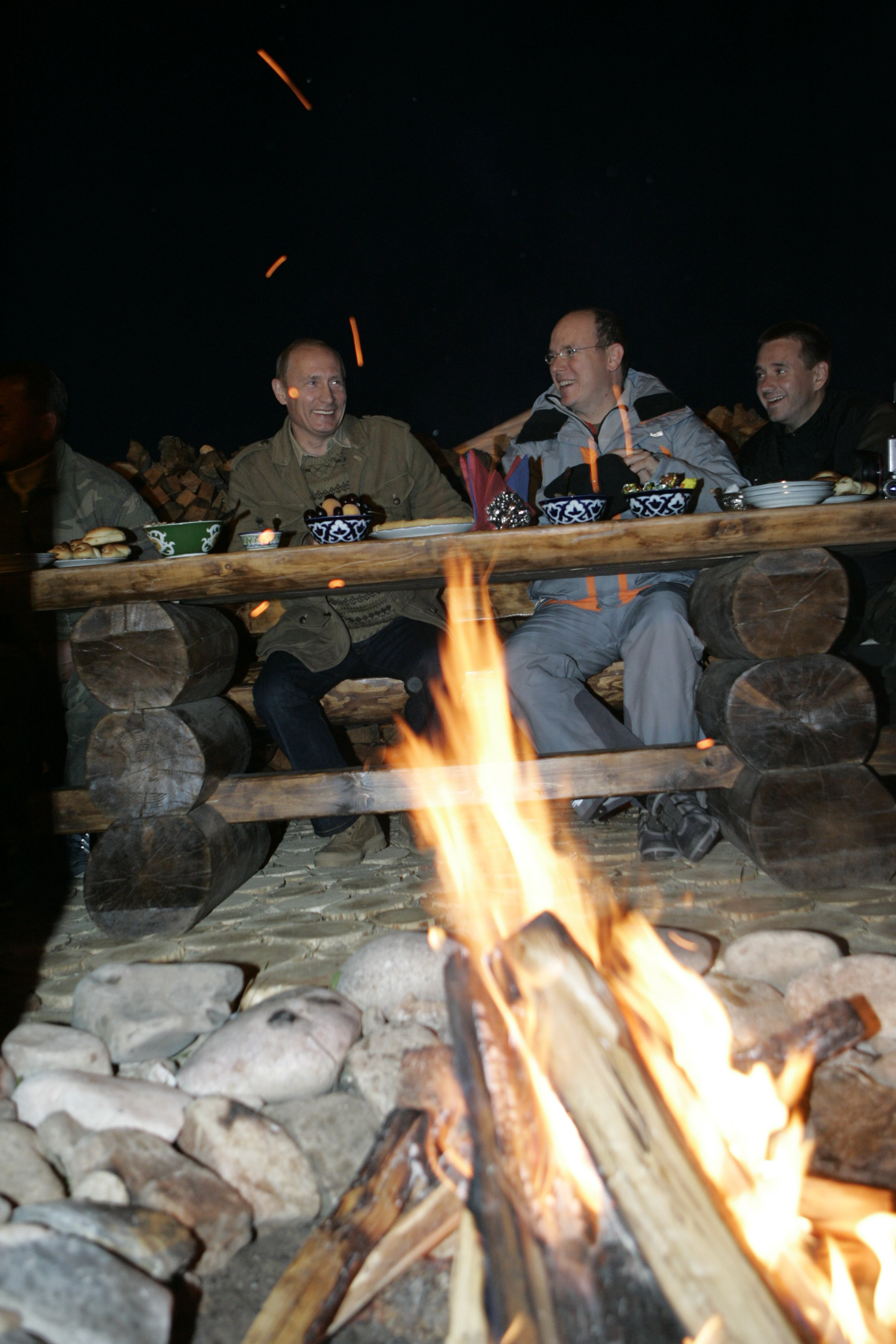
Vladimir Putin with Albert II during a trip to Tuva in 2007.

The current ambassador of Russia to Monaco is Alexander Orlov, who was appointed by Russian president Dmitry Medvedev on 1 December 2008. Orlov, who is resident of Paris, presented his credentials to Albert II, Prince of Monaco on 24 March 2009 at the Prince's Palace of Monaco. The current ambassador of Monaco to Russia is Claude Giordan, with residence in Berlin, who presented his credentials to Russian Deputy Minister of Foreign Affairs Vladimir Titov in Moscow on 12 June 2009.

=== Political relations ===
On 12 August 2007, Russian president Vladimir Putin hosted Albert II at Peterhof in Saint Petersburg, where Putin thanked the Monegasque prince for his support for Russia's successful bid for the 2014 Winter Olympics in Sochi on the Black Sea. In what was seen as a sign of Putin's gratitude, the following day the two leaders travelled to Tuva in southern Siberia. Whilst in Tuva, the two leaders visited the Por-Bazhyn fortress where an archaeological dig was underway, and went on a rafting and fishing trip on the Yenisei River. During the trip, Albert was presented with two Baikal seals from Alexander Tishanin, the governor of Irkutsk Oblast, which were later placed in a home at Monaco's Oceanographic Museum.

According to a former adviser to Albert II, in a sign of the increasing friendship between Putin and Albert II, Russian officials sent a team of builders to Monaco in 2008 to erect a three-bedroom dacha in the garden of Albert's estate, located in the hills behind Monte Carlo.

=== Economic relations ===
Monaco's status as a tax haven has turned the Principality into a favourite playground for rich Russians. There are currently four Russian enterprises doing business on the territory of Monaco.

==== Trade relations ====
Trade turnover between the two nations is nominal, reaching approximately €1 million per year. Russian exports to Monaco are food products, optical instruments and devices, and clocks and watches. Monegasque exports to Russia are food products, clothing, automobiles and perfumery products.

=== Cultural relations ===
Cultural relations between Monaco and Russia date back to the beginning of the twentieth century. Between 1911 and 1929, Sergei Diaghilev's Ballets Russes was staged in Monaco. To mark the centennial of Ballets Russes performances in Monaco, in 2009–2010, the Monte-Carlo Philharmonic Orchestra staged concerts marking the works of Diaghilev, which include performances of Petrushka, Le Sacre du printemps, Daphnis et Chloé, Shéhérazade and L'Oiseau de feu. The Louis Notari Library will also have an exhibition on Diaghilev and his troupe.

Since the dissolution of the Soviet Union, various famous Russian cultural organisations have toured to Monaco, including the Bolshoi Ballet, Mariinsky Ballet, Red Army Choir and Dance Ensemble, amongst others.

== See also ==
- Foreign relations of Monaco
- Foreign relations of Russia
