= Monaco–Spain relations =

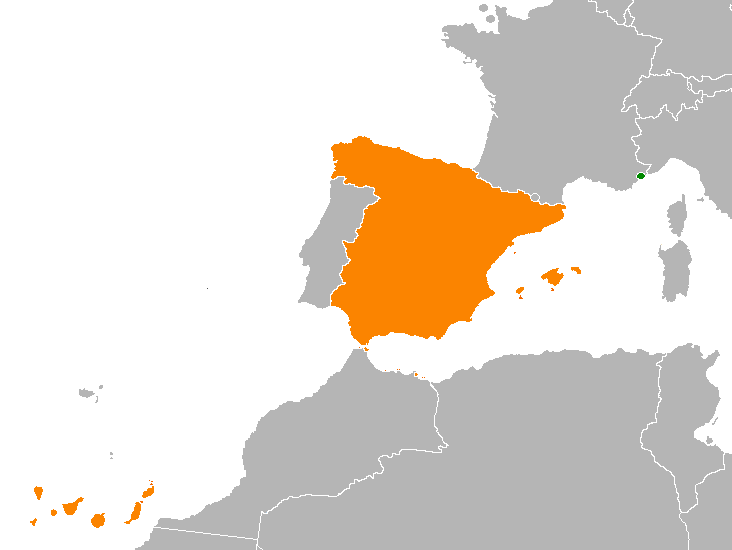
- Monaco: Spain

Monaco–Spain relations are the bilateral relations between Monaco and Spain. Monaco has an embassy in Madrid Spain is accredited to Monaco from its embassy in Paris, France.

== Diplomatic relations ==
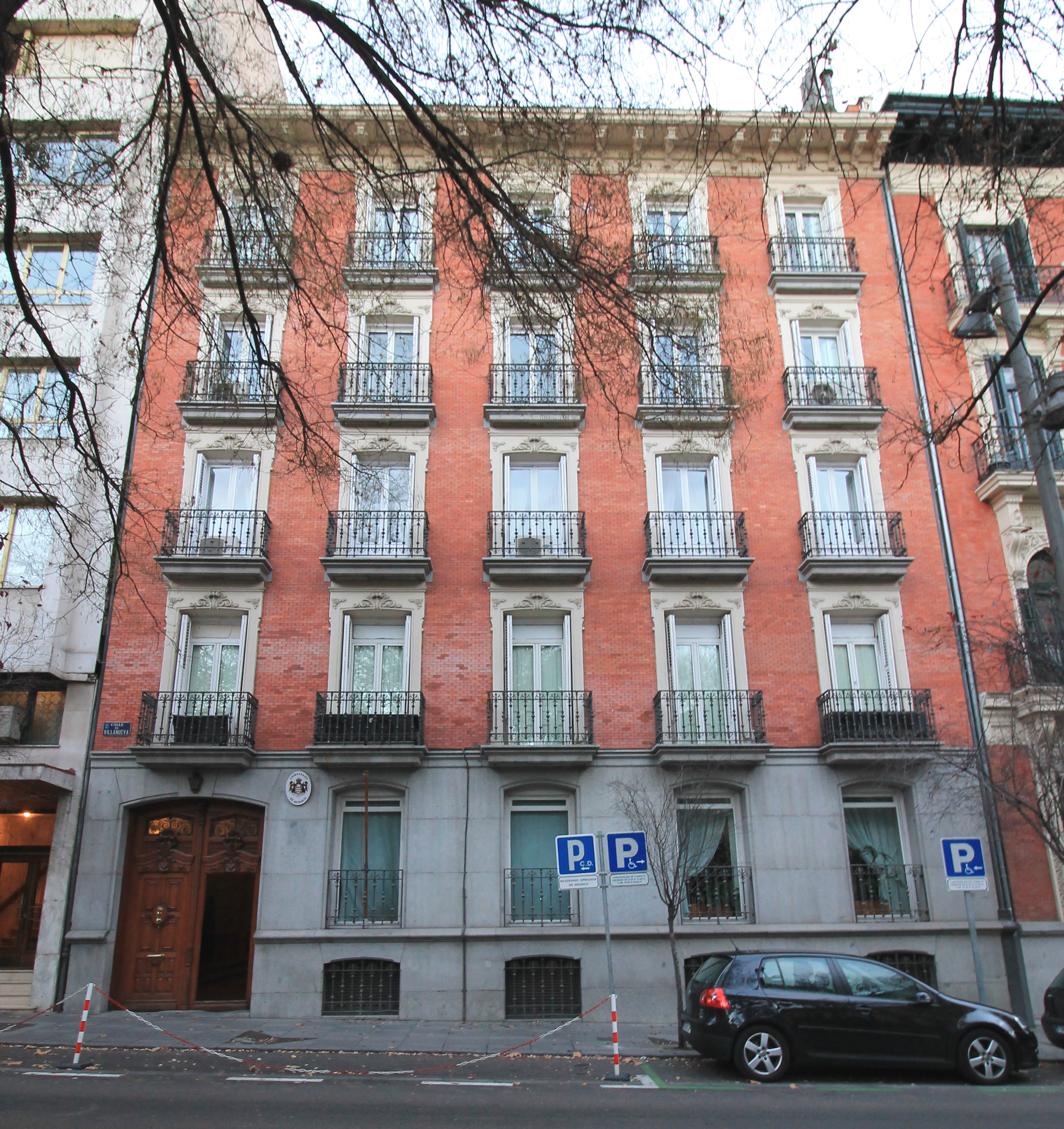
Embassy of Monaco in Madrid

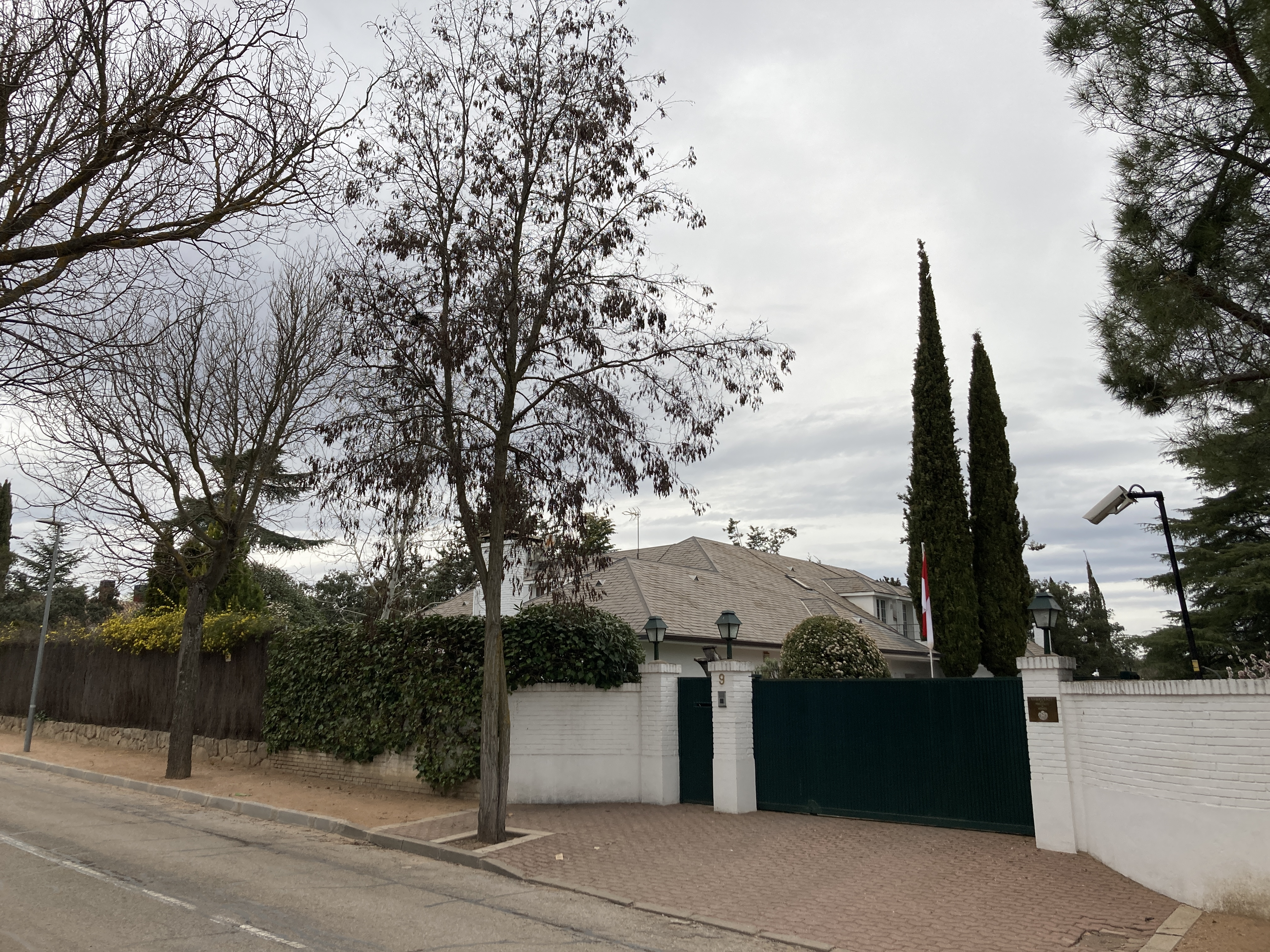
Residence of the ambassador of Monaco Alcobendas

In 1876, King Alfonso XII authorized the creation of a legation of the Principality of Monaco in Madrid. Since then, the Principality maintained its representation continuously in the capital of Spain until, in the decade of the 1930s and as a consequence of the Spanish Civil War and after the World War II, the legation was closed.

In 1996, Monaco opened an embassy in Madrid, and currently the Principality of Monaco is represented in Spain through a resident Ambassador in Madrid.

Spain appointed Carlos Bastarreche as the first ambassador in Monaco with residence in Paris in November 2013. Since then, Spanish ambassadors to France are dually accredited to Monaco.

== Treaties and Agreements ==
- Exchange of notes on the abolition of the mandatory passport to facilitate tourism between Spain and Monaco, from 13 April to 26 June 1978.
- European Extradition Convention (No. 24 of the Council of Europe) of 13 December 1957. It was ratified by Monaco on 30 January 2009 and entered into force on 1 May 2009. Spain ratified it on 7 May 1982 .

== Resident diplomatic missions ==
- Monaco has an embassy in Madrid.
- Spain is accredited to Monaco from its embassy in Paris, France.

== See also ==
- Foreign relations of Monaco
- Foreign relations of Spain
