= France–Monaco relations =

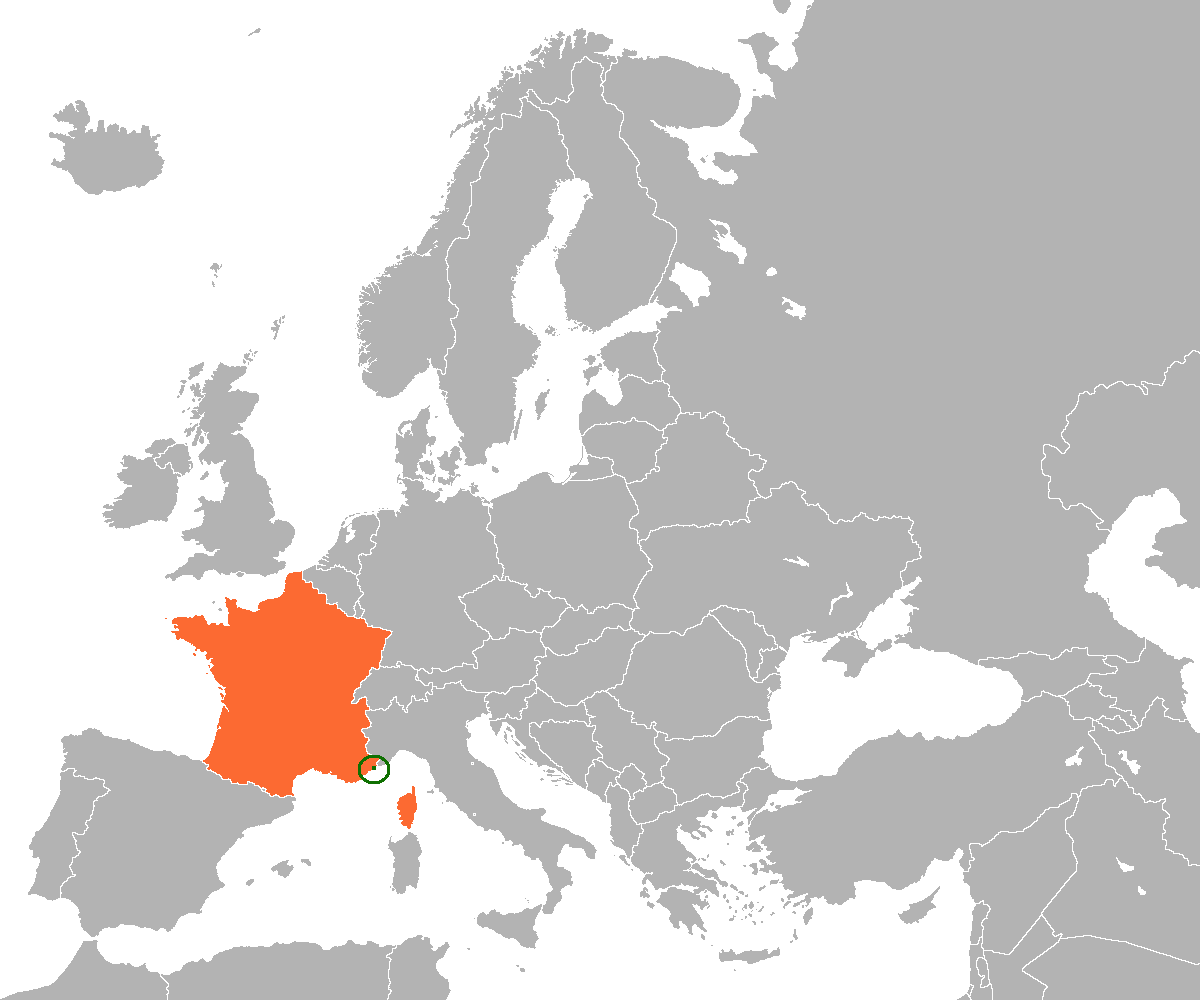
- Monaco: France

France–Monaco relations are the special relationship between the French Republic and the Principality of Monaco.

A friendship treaty signed in 2002 reads:

The French Republic assures the Principality of Monaco of the defence of its independence and sovereignty and guarantees the integrity of Monegasque territory under the same conditions as its own. The Principality of Monaco commits that the actions it undertakes in the exercise of its sovereignty are in accordance with the fundamental interests of the French Republic in the political, economic, security and defence fields.

The special relationship can be illustrated by the fact that the Minister of State, the head of government of Monaco, is usually a French citizen, whose appointment by the Prince of Monaco is proposed by the Government of France.

== History ==
In 1419, Monaco gained control of its own sovereignty from French control after Lambert Grimaldi convinced the French king Charles VIII to grant it independence. King Louis XII recognized Monaco in 1512 with the signing of a document that also declared a perpetual alliance with the king of France. Following rule by Spain, in the early 1600s Monaco prospered again under Honoré II who strengthened ties with France, a relationship that lasted in this capacity for the next two hundred years. In the Treaty of 2 February (1861) Prince Charles III ceded Monegasque sovereignty over the towns of Menton and Roquebrune (now Roquebrune-Cap-Martin) in exchange for full independence from France. Following World War I, a treaty signed on 27 July 1919, as well as Article 436 of the Treaty of Versailles, put Monaco under limited French protection once again and affirmed the special relationship. This relationship continues to the present day with the French government taking responsibility for Monaco's defence, while the latter has only a small police force and palace guard. A mutual legal agreement and a common regime was also set between the two countries; they also signed the Treaty of 1945 and the Agreement of 1963 on furthering their relationship.

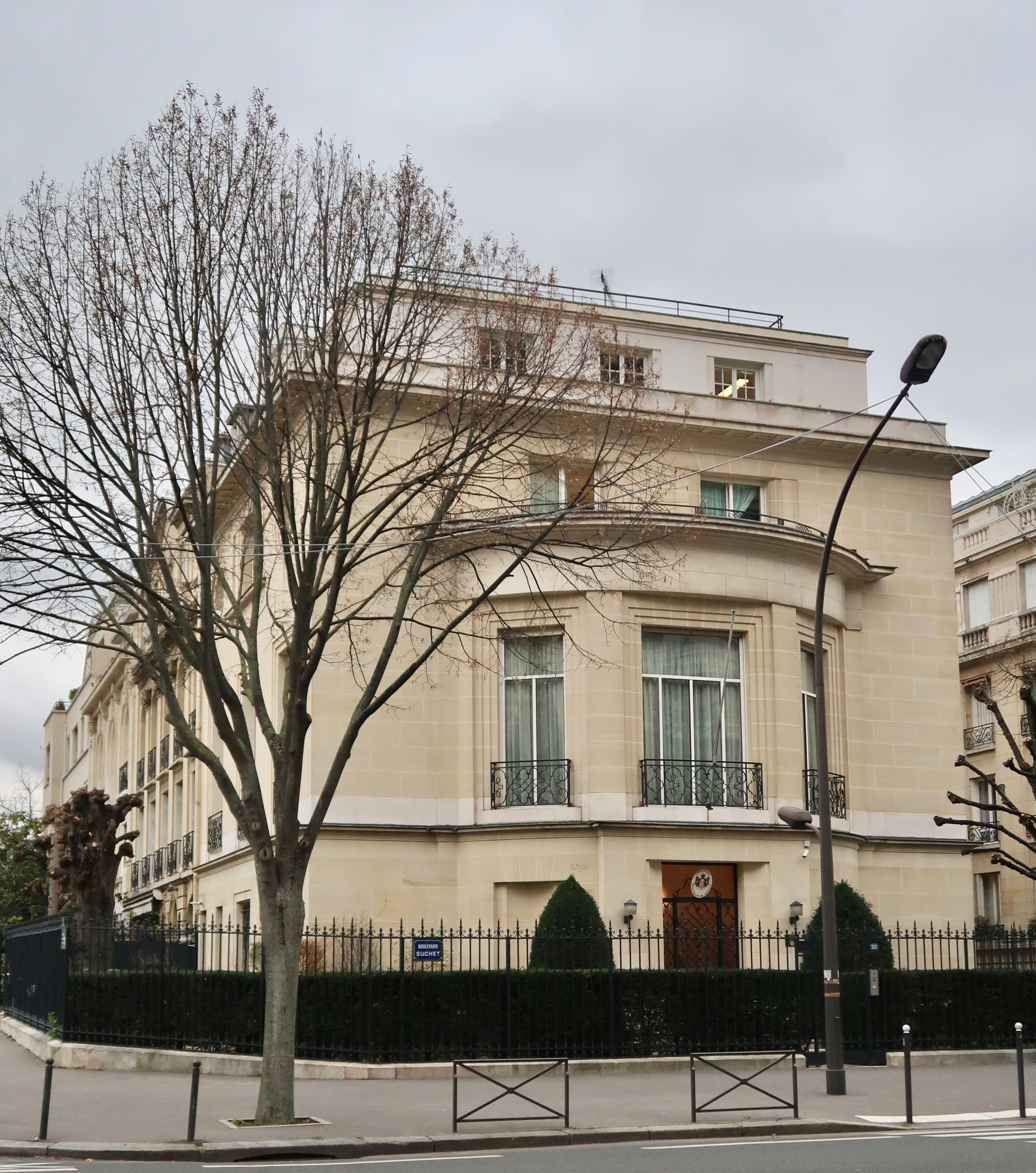
Embassy of Monaco in Paris

In 2002, the laws deriving from the Treaty of Versailles that governed relations between Monaco and France were renegotiated. It was finally ratified in 2005 with new terms that: upgraded France's representation from a consulate to that of an embassy; permitted other countries to accredit ambassadors to Monaco; and, formally recognised Monaco's ruling Grimaldi dynasty's succession scheme that was initially set out in the 1962 constitution, and which also extended eligibility to the ruling prince's daughters and other family members.

== Economic ties ==
The European External Action Service (EEAS) has worked with Monaco in its initiatives through the relationship with France. Monaco has thus been integrated into the Schengen zone. The EU Council of Ministers authorised France to negotiate a Monetary Agreement that allows Monaco to inter alia use the euro as its official currency, grant legal status to the euro and to issue a limited quantity of euro coins with its own national sides. It also signed an agreement with Monaco in regards to the application of EU legislation on pharmaceuticals, cosmetic products and medical devices that was enacted on 1 May 2004. However, goods produced in Monaco would not be assimilated into products of EU origin. An agreement on savings taxation was brought into force on 1 July 2005.

Monaco is fully integrated into a customs union with France, which also enables participation in the EU market system. The latter collects and rebates trade duties with Monaco. The euro was adopted as the official currency on 1 January 2002.

== Monegasque politics ==
In 1962, Monaco's refusal to impose a tax on both its residents and international businesses caused problems in relations. However, it was resolved with an agreement that French citizens with less than five years of residence in Monaco and companies doing more than 25 percent of their business outside the country would be taxed at French rates. The crisis also led to a new constitution and the restoration of the National Council. Amongst the edicts of the new constitution is the prince's nomination of a Council of Government that consists of a Minister of State who is a French citizen and selected for a three-year term from a group of senior French civil servants selected by the French government. They are the prince's representative and are in charge of foreign relations, directs executive services, the police and the Council of Government. They also choose three council members: one to take care of the economy and finances; one for home affairs; and, one for social affairs. All ministers are accountable to the Prince of Monaco. Since 2002, the Minister of State can be either French or Monegasque.

Monaco has also agreed to exercise its sovereign rights in conformity with French interests.

== Judiciary ==
Monaco's legal system, which is modeled on the Napoleonic Code, is similar to that of France. Members of the judiciary of Monaco, such as members of the Supreme Court, can be French citizens.

== Cultural relations ==
The two countries share French as their official language, although the historic language of Monaco is Monégasque, a variety of Ligurian, one of the Gallo-Italic languages. French and Italian nationals comprise more than half the country's population. French cuisine is also prevalent in Monaco.

Approximately two-thirds of Monaco's 30,000 jobs are filled by workers from neighbouring French and Italian towns.

== Resident diplomatic missions ==
- France has an embassy in Monte Carlo.
- Monaco has an embassy in Paris.
