= China–Monaco relations =

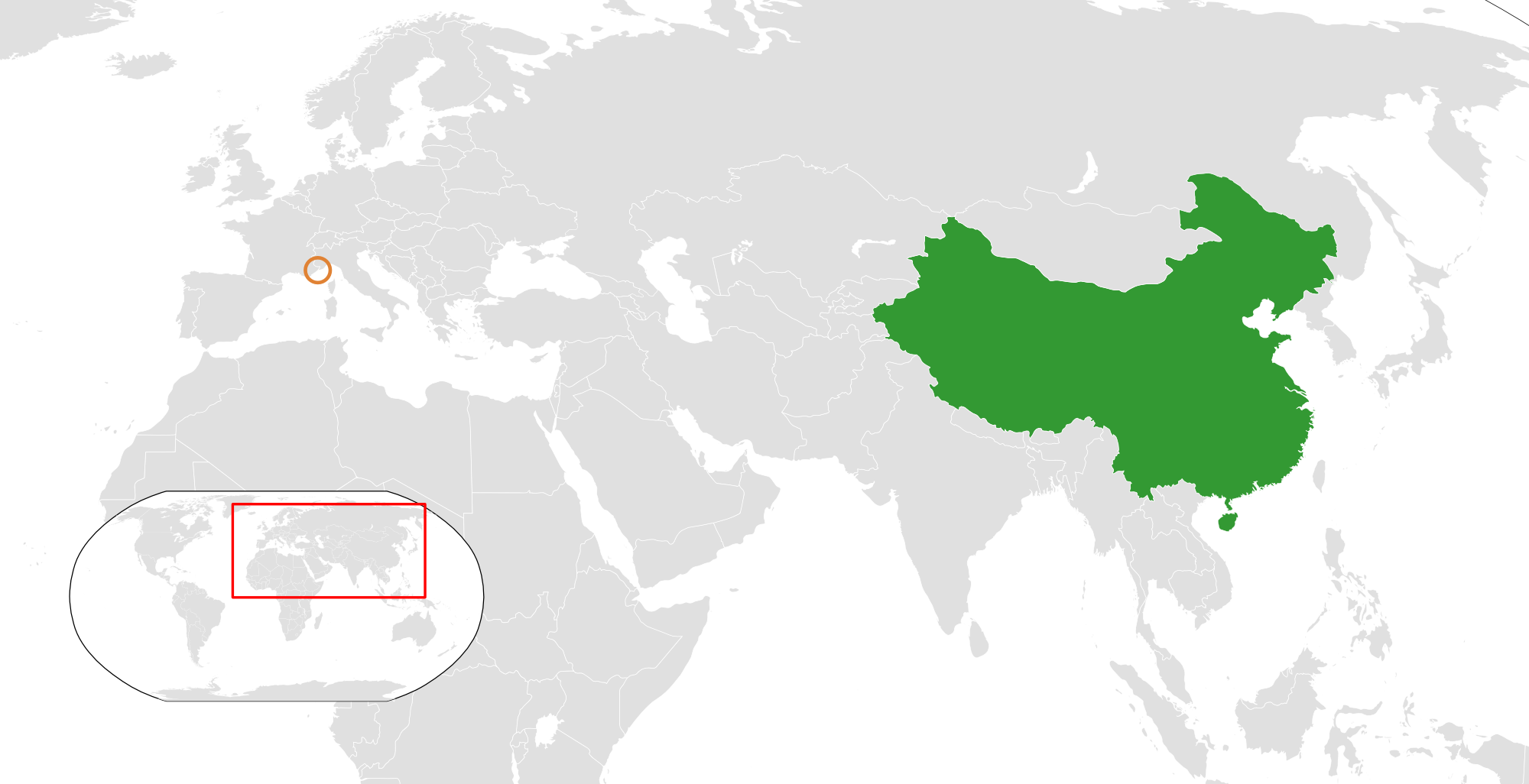
- China: Monaco

China–Monaco relations refers to the bilateral relations between the People's Republic of China and the Principality of Monaco.

== History ==
In January 1995, China and Monaco established diplomatic relations at the consular level, which was concurrently administered by the Chinese Consulate General in Marseille. In 2001, Monaco appointed Xu Feng, a national of the Republic of China, as its honorary consul in Shanghai, and established an honorary consulate in Shanghai in the same year. In February 2006, it was upgraded to ambassadorial level, which was concurrently administered by the Chinese Embassy in France.

In 2019, it became the first European country to roll out a 5G phone network using technology by Huawei. General Secretary of the Chinese Communist Party Xi Jinping visited Monaco to meet with Albert II, Prince of Monaco in March 2019. In February 2022, Prince Albert II of Monaco visited China to attend the opening ceremony of the Beijing Winter Olympics and met with Chinese leader Xi Jinping at the Great Hall of the People in Beijing.

== Economic relations ==
According to statistics from the General Administration of Customs of China, in 2022, the total import and export volume between China and Monaco was US$26.38 million, a year-on-year increase of 10%. Among them, China's exports amounted to US$12.04 million, a year-on-year increase of 111.4%, and imports amounted to US$14.34 million, a year-on-year decrease of 21.5%. China's imports mainly include chemical industry products, electromechanical audio-visual equipment and parts, plastics and their products, and rubber and its products. China's exports mainly include electromechanical audio-visual equipment and parts, base metals and their products, plastics and their products, and rubber and its products.
