= European Union Customs Union =

European Union common customs area

- EU member states Non-EU states which participate in the customs union, or are in bilateral customs unions with the EU
- Type: Customs union
- Membership: 27 EU member states: Austria; Belgium; Bulgaria; Croatia; Cyprus; Czech Republic; Denmark; Estonia; Finland; France; Germany; Greece; Hungary; Ireland; Italy; Latvia; Lithuania; Luxembourg; Malta; Netherlands; Poland; Portugal; Romania; Slovakia; Slovenia; Spain; Sweden; 6 states/territories with bilateral agreements: Akrotiri and Dhekelia (United Kingdom); Andorra; Gibraltar (United Kingdom); Monaco; San Marino; Turkey
- Establishment: 1968

Area
  - Total: 4,950,000 km^{2} (1,910,000 sq mi)

Population
  - 2021 estimate: ▼518,000,000
- GDP (PPP): 2021 estimate
  - Total: ▼$16.1 trillion
- GDP (nominal): 2021 estimate
  - Total: ▼$16.6 trillion

The European Union Customs Union (EUCU) is a customs union which consists of all the member states of the European Union (EU), Monaco, and the British Overseas Territory (BOT) of Akrotiri and Dhekelia. Some detached territories of EU states do not participate in the customs union, usually as a result of their geographic separation. (Note: For example, Büsingen am Hochrhein, an exclave of Germany within Switzerland.) In addition to the EUCU, the EU is in customs unions with Andorra, the BOT of Gibraltar, San Marino and Turkey (with the exceptions of certain goods), (Note: See European Union–Turkey Customs Union.) through separate bilateral agreements.

There are no tariffs or non-tariff barriers to trade between the members of the customs union and—unlike a free trade area—members of the customs union impose a common external tariff on all goods entering the union.

The European Commission negotiates for and on behalf of the Union as a whole international trade deals under the EU's Common Commercial Policy, rather than each member state negotiating individually. The Commission also represents the Union in the World Trade Organization and any trade disputes mediated through it.

== Common external tariffs ==
The EU Customs Union sets the tariff rates for imports to the EU from other countries. These rates are detailed and depend on the specific type of product imported, and can also vary by the time of year. The full WTO Most Favoured Nation tariff rates apply only to those countries that do not have a Free Trade Agreement with the EU, or are not on a WTO recognised exemption scheme such as Everything but Arms (an EU support arrangement for least developed countries).

== Union and common transit ==
Union transit, formerly called "Community transit", is a system generally applicable to the movement of non-Union goods for which customs duties and other charges due on import have not been paid, and of Union goods, which, between their point of departure and point of destination in the EU, have to pass through the territory of a third country.

The 'common' transit procedure is used for the movement of goods between the EU Member States, the EFTA countries (Iceland, Norway, Liechtenstein and Switzerland), Turkey (since 1 December 2012), North Macedonia (since 1 July 2015) and Serbia (since 1 February 2016). The operation of the common transit procedure with the UK is ensured as the UK has deposited its instrument of accession on 30 January 2019 with the Secretariat of the Council of the EU. The procedure is based on the Convention of 20 May 1987 on a common transit procedure. The rules are effectively identical to those of the Union transit.

Edward Kellett-Bowman MEP, as rapporteur for a European Parliament Committee of Inquiry, presented a report to the Parliament in February 1997 which identified the removal of border controls and a lack of co-operation by member states as being responsible for a rise in organised crime and smuggling. Kellett-Bowman's report led to the European Union setting up a customs investigation body and computerising transit-monitoring systems.

== Modernised Customs Code ==
The Modernised Customs Code (MCC) was adopted under Regulation (EC) No 450/2008 of the European Parliament and of the Council of 23 April 2008 laying down the Community Customs Code (Modernised Customs Code). The MCC was primarily adopted to enable IT customs and trade solutions to be adopted.

== Union Customs Code ==
The Union Customs Code (UCC), intended to further modernise customs procedures, entered into force on 1 May 2016. This superseded the MCC. The European Commission has stated that the aims of the UCC are simplicity, service and speed. Implementation took place over a period of time and most aspects of implementation were complete by 31 December 2020, although some formalities managed by electronic systems may not be fully implemented until 31 December 2025.

One major goal of the UCC is to progress towards the complete use of electronic systems for interactions between businesses and customs authorities, and between customs authorities, bringing all paper-based customs processes to an end.

== Customs reform ==
In 2023, the European Commission proposed the most comprehensive customs reform since the Customs Union's establishment in 1968. Under the customs reform, the EU decided in 2025 to eliminate the €150 customs-free threshold and added a €3 customs duty for such small parcels. Furthermore, the EU plans to establish an agency for customs, the European Union Customs Authority.

== Non-EU participants ==
Monaco and the British Overseas Territory of Akrotiri and Dhekelia are integral parts of the EU's customs territory.

State / territory	Agreement	Entry into force
Monaco	Franco-Monegasque Customs Convention	1968
Akrotiri and Dhekelia (United Kingdom)	Treaty of Accession 2003; Brexit withdrawal agreement	1 May 2004

=== Historical non-EU participants ===
- Jungholz, an Austrian pene-exclave surrounded on four sides by German territory and only accessible via Germany, was de facto part of the EUCU from 1 July 1968 until Austria joined the EU on 1 January 1995.
- Kleinwalsertal, an Austrian functional exclave only accessible via German roads, was de facto part of the EUCU from 1 July 1968 until Austria joined the EU on 1 January 1995.

== EU territories with opt-outs ==
A clickable Euler diagram showing the relationships between various European regional organisations

While all EU member states are part of the customs union, not all of their respective territories participate. Territories of member states which have remained outside of the EU (overseas territories of the European Union) generally do not participate in the customs union.

However, some territories within the EU do not participate in the customs union for tax and/or geographical reasons:

- Büsingen am Hochrhein (German exclave within Switzerland, part of the Swiss Customs Area)
- Heligoland (small German archipelago in the North Sea with VAT free status)
- Livigno (remote Alpine town in Italy with VAT free status)
- Ceuta and Melilla (Spanish territories in Africa with VAT free status).

=== Historical opt-outs ===
The following territories were excluded until the end of 2019:

- Campione d'Italia (an exclave of Italy surrounded by Swiss territory)
- the Italian waters of Lake Lugano

== Bilateral customs unions ==
Andorra, San Marino, Turkey and the British Overseas Territory of Gibraltar are each in a customs union with the EU.

State / territory	Agreement	Entry into force	Notes
Andorra	Agreement in the form of an Exchange of Letters between the European Economic Community and the Principality of Andorra	1 January 1991	Excludes agricultural produce
Gibraltar (United Kingdom)	Agreement in respect of Gibraltar between the European Union and the European Atomic Energy Community, of the one part, and the United Kingdom of Great Britain and Northern Ireland, of the other part	TBD	Provisional application from 15 July 2026
San Marino	Agreement on Cooperation and Customs Union between the European Economic Community and the Republic of San Marino	1 April 2002	
Turkey	Decision No 1/95 of the EC-Turkey Association Council of 22 December 1995 on implementing the final phase of the Customs Union	31 December 1995	Excludes agricultural produce

== Special arrangements concerning territories of the United Kingdom ==
The United Kingdom of Great Britain and Northern Ireland left the European Union on 31 January 2020 and transition arrangements ended on 31 December 2020. Special arrangements have been made for those parts of the United Kingdom and its territories that share a land border with an EU member state.

=== Northern Ireland ===
The UK (including Northern Ireland) is no longer a member of the European Union Customs Union. However, there are special arrangements in place for Northern Ireland: its trade with Great Britain and its trade with the European Union are each now regulated by the Brexit withdrawal agreement (specifically the Northern Ireland Protocol and the Windsor Framework), the EU–UK Trade and Cooperation Agreement, the European Union (Future Relationship) Act 2020, the United Kingdom Internal Market Act 2020. These include special provisions for trade in goods between Northern Ireland and the EU which for many purposes are similar to those that apply within the Customs Union, although Northern Ireland remains part of United Kingdom Customs territory.

=== Gibraltar ===
Gibraltar left the EU concurrently with the United Kingdom. When part of the EU, it was one of the EU territories with opt-outs and had not been part of the Customs Union. On 31 December 2020, the EU, Spain, the UK, and Gibraltar agreed negotiate a treaty which would include provisions for trade on goods between the EU and Gibraltar. The agreement was signed in Brussels on 14 July 2026, which allowed it to be provisionally applied from 15 July 2026.

The agreement establishes a bilateral customs union between the EU and Gibraltar allowing free movement of goods produced in the EU or Gibraltar. Goods imported to Gibraltar from third countries or exported from Gibraltar to third countries will cleared by Spanish customs authorities at customs offices in Algeciras, La Línea de la Concepción or Sagunto, or at a designated customs office in Portugal.

=== Akrotiri and Dhekelia ===
As already noted above, the British Overseas Territory of Akrotiri and Dhekelia on the island of Cyprus are integral parts of the EU's customs territory (and remained so after Brexit).

== See also ==
- Community preference – Former principle of EU governance
- European Union value added tax – EU-wide goods and services tax policy
  - EU VAT area
- European Customs Information Portal – EU Import/Export information service
- European Economic Area (EU and EFTA except Switzerland)
- European Free Trade Association (EFTA)
- European integration – Process of integration of states in and around Europe
- European Single Market – Single market of the European Union and participating non-EU countries
- European Union–Turkey Customs Union
- Free trade agreements of the European Union – Overview of free trade agreements in the European Union
- Free trade areas in Europe – EU, EFTA, CEFTA, CISFTA, GUAM, BAFTA
- Free-trade area – Regional trade agreement
- Market access – Ability to sell goods and services across borders
- Non-tariff barriers to trade – Other types of trade barriers
- Rules of origin – Rules to attribute a country of origin to a product
- Tariff – Goods import or export tax
