= Franco-Monégasque Treaties =

Series of treaties between France and Monaco

The Franco-Monégasque Treaties of 1861, 1918, and 2002 are the basis of the relationship between France and Monaco. The treaties define Monaco's independent status and sovereignty, as well as the rights of succession of the princely House of Grimaldi.

== 1861 Treaty ==
The Franco-Monégasque Treaty of 1861 recognised the sovereignty of Monaco. Previously, under the Treaty of Vienna, the principality had been a protectorate of the Kingdom of Sardinia. In exchange, Monaco ceded their claim to the towns of Menton and Roquebrune-Cap-Martin for 4 million francs.

== 1918 Treaty ==
A second treaty was signed by Stephen Pichon, then the French minister of foreign affairs, and a representative of Albert I, Prince of Monaco on 17 July 1918, owing to the Monaco Succession Crisis of 1918 near the end of the First World War. At the time the heir to the Monégasque throne had no legitimate children, and the possibility of his German cousins, the dukes of Urach, succeeding in the future to the throne was unacceptable to the French. Pressure was brought to bear on the Monégasques to ratify treaty provisions which would empower France to prevent such an occurrence.

Article 2 of the treaty stipulated that foreign policy measures concerning Monaco must be agreed upon by the French and Monégasque governments.

== 2002 Treaty ==
A third, and most current treaty was signed on 24 October 2002. Monaco had become a full member state of the United Nations in May 1993. The 2002 treaty addressed issues of sovereignty raised by the 2002 revision of Monaco's constitution. Under those constitutional revisions, approved by the 2002 treaty, although only a born member of the Grimaldi line may now wear the Crown, Monaco assumes the unilateral prerogative to alter the order of succession and the principality's independence is explicitly secured. This resolved Monégasque concerns that under the 1918 treaty dynastic acts affecting the succession (such as marriage or adoption within the reigning House of Grimaldi) required French assent, yet if a vacancy on the throne occurred, Monaco would have automatically become a French protectorate. That prospect no longer exists.
