= Euroscepticism =

Body of criticism of the European Union

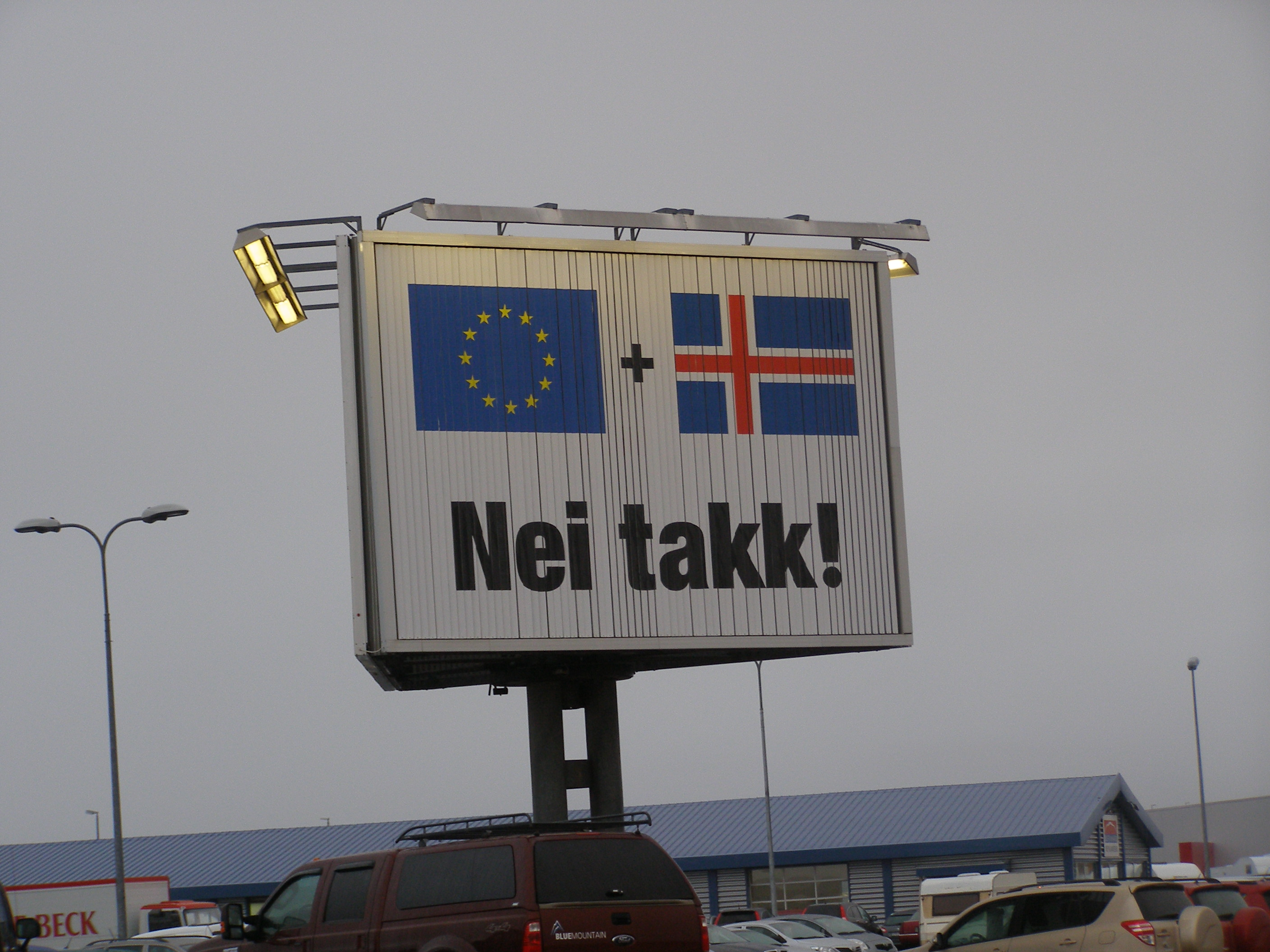
Eurosceptical advertising poster in 2013, Keflavík, Iceland with the text "No thanks!"

Euroscepticism, also spelled as Euroskepticism or EU-scepticism, is a political position involving criticism of the European Union (EU) and European integration. It ranges from those who oppose some EU institutions and policies and seek reform (Eurorealism, Eurocritical, or soft Euroscepticism), to those who oppose EU membership and see the EU as unreformable (anti-European Unionism, anti-EUism, or hard Euroscepticism). The opposite of Euroscepticism is known as pro-Europeanism.

The main drivers of Euroscepticism have been beliefs that integration undermines national sovereignty and the nation state, that the EU is elitist and lacks democratic legitimacy and transparency, that it is too bureaucratic and wasteful, that it encourages high levels of immigration, or perceptions that it is a neoliberal organisation serving the big business elite at the expense of the working class, that it is responsible for austerity, and drives privatization.

Euroscepticism is found in groups across the political spectrum, with both left-wing and right-wing support, and is often found in populist parties. Although they criticise the EU for many of the same reasons, Eurosceptic left-wing populists focus more on economic issues, such as the Euro area crisis and the Transatlantic Trade and Investment Partnership, while Eurosceptic right-wing populists focus more on nationalism and immigration, such as the 2015 European migrant crisis. The rise in radical-right parties since the 2000s is strongly linked to a rise in Euroscepticism.

Eurobarometer surveys of EU citizens show that trust in the EU and its institutions declined strongly from 2007 to 2015. In that period, it was consistently below 50%. A 2009 survey showed that support for EU membership was lowest in the United Kingdom (UK), Latvia, and Hungary. By 2016, the countries viewing the EU most unfavourably were the UK, Greece, France, and Spain. The 2016 United Kingdom European Union membership referendum resulted in a 51.9% vote in favour of leaving the EU (Brexit), a decision that came into effect on 31 January 2020.

Since 2015, trust in the EU has risen in most EU countries as a result of falling unemployment rates and the end of the migrant crisis. A post-2019 election Eurobarometer survey showed that 68% of citizens support the EU, the highest level since 1983; however, sentiment that things are not going in the right direction in the EU had increased to 50%. Trust in the EU had increased significantly at the beginning of the COVID-19 pandemic with levels varying across member states.

In March 2025, support for the European Union reached an all-time high among citizens of EU members states. A Eurobarometer poll conducted in January and February found that 74% of EU citizens believe their country’s membership in the bloc is beneficial, the highest level recorded since the question was first introduced in 1983. The decline in Euroscepticism has been attributed to growing security concerns amid ongoing geopolitical instability, including the Russo-Ukrainian war and renewed transatlantic tensions under Donald Trump, who has been critical of NATO and the European Union.

== Reasoning ==
The main reasons for Euroscepticism include beliefs that:

- integration undermines national sovereignty and the nation state;
- the EU is elitist and lacks democratic legitimacy and transparency;
- the EU is too bureaucratic and wasteful;
- it encourages high levels of immigration;
- it is a neoliberal organisation serving the big business elite at the expense of the working class;
- the EU is responsible for austerity;
- the EU is responsible for driving privatization.

European political parties that espouse Euroscepticism tend to be broadly populist, however this can manifest as both left-wing populism (such as La France Insoumise in France) and right-wing populism (such as the Party for Freedom in the Netherlands). Neither is Euroscepticism necessarily limited to populist parties, with parties such as the UK's Conservative Party and Iceland's Independence Party having expressed Eurosceptic tendencies despite being considered mainstream in their respective countries.

Right-wing opposition to the EU tends to promote national sovereignty and national identity in opposition to European integration, as well as opposition to specific EU policies and perceived costs placed upon their country. For example, in the lead-up to the UK's EU membership referendum the Leave campaign promoted the idea of taking back control from the EU, particularly of immigration policy, and criticised the size of the UK's budget contributions towards the EU.

== Terminology ==
There can be considered to be several different types of Eurosceptic thought, which differ in the extent to which adherents reject integration between member states of the EU and in their reasons for doing so. Aleks Szczerbiak and Paul Taggart described two of these as hard and soft Euroscepticism. At the same time, some scholars have said that there is no clear line between the presumed hard and soft Euroscepticism. Cas Mudde and Petr Kopecky have said that if the demarcation line is the number of and which policies a party opposes, then the question arises of how many must a party oppose and which ones should a party oppose that makes them hard Eurosceptic instead of soft.

=== Hard Euroscepticism ===
According to Taggart and Szczerbiak, hard Euroscepticism, or anti-EU-ism, is "a principled opposition to the EU and European integration and therefore can be seen in parties who think that their countries should withdraw from membership, or whose policies towards the EU are tantamount to being opposed to the whole project of European integration as it is currently conceived". The Europe of Freedom and Direct Democracy group in the European Parliament (2014–2019) displayed hard Euroscepticism, but following the 2019 EU elections the group was disbanded due to too few members, as its largest member, the British Brexit Party, withdrew ahead of the United Kingdom's formal exit from the EU.

Some hard Eurosceptics regard their position as pragmatic rather than in principle. Additionally, Tony Benn, a left-wing Labour Party MP who fought against European integration in 1975 by opposing membership of the European Communities in that year's referendum on the issue, emphasised his opposition to xenophobia and his support of democracy, saying: "My view about the European Union has always been not that I am hostile to foreigners, but that I am in favour of democracy. ... I think they're building an empire there, they want us to be a part of their empire and I don't want that."

The Czech president Václav Klaus rejected the term Euroscepticism for its purported negative undertones, saying at a meeting in April 2012 that the expressions for a Eurosceptic and their opponent should be "a Euro-realist" and someone who is "Euro-naïve", respectively. François Asselineau of the French Popular Republican Union has criticised the use of the term 'sceptic' to describe hard Eurosceptics, and would rather advocate the use of the term "Euro opponent". He believes the use of the term 'sceptic' for soft Eurosceptics to be correct, since other Eurosceptic parties in France are "merely criticising" the EU without taking into account the fact that the Treaty of Rome can be modified only with a unanimous agreement of all the EU member states, something he considers impossible to achieve.

=== Soft Euroscepticism ===
Soft Euroscepticism, also known as Eurorealism, reflects a support for the existence of, and membership of, a form of EU but with opposition to specific EU policies, or in Taggart's and Szczerbiak's words, "where there is NOT a principled objection to European integration or EU membership but where concerns on one (or a number) of policy areas lead to the expression of qualified opposition to the EU, or where there is a sense that 'national interest' is currently at odds with the EU's trajectory."

Both the European Conservatives and Reformists Group, dominated by the right-wing Polish party Law and Justice as well as the Italian Brothers of Italy party, and The Left Group, which is an alliance of the left-wing parties in the European Parliament, display soft Euroscepticism. The European Conservatives and Reformist Group does not itself use the descriptions Euroscepticism or soft Euroscepticism and instead describes its position as one of Eurorealism, a distinction described by Leruth as being one that is "quite subtle but should not be ignored" given the association of the term Euroscepticism with "European disintegration". Leruth describes Eurorealism as "a pragmatic, anti-federalist, and flexible vision of European integration where the principle of subsidiarity prevails, aiming to reform the current institutional framework to extend the role of national parliaments in the decision-making process." Steven states that "Eurorealism is a form of conservativism, first and foremost, rather than a form or Euroscepticism, even if it obviously very much also has the 'soft' Eurosceptic tendencies which are present in a number of ECR member parties."

=== Anti-Europeanism ===
While having some overlaps, Euroscepticism and anti-Europeanism are different. Euroscepticism is criticism of the European Union (EU) and European integration. Anti-Europeanism is sentiment or policies in opposition to Europe. For example, American exceptionalism in the United States has long led to criticism of European domestic policy, such as the size of the welfare state in European countries, and foreign policy, such as European countries that did not support the US-led 2003 invasion of Iraq.

=== Other terms ===
Some scholars consider the gradual difference in terminology between hard and soft Euroscepticism inadequate to accommodate the large differences in terms of political agenda; hard Euroscepticism has also been referred to as Europhobia as opposed to mere Euroscepticism. Other alternative names for hard and soft Euroscepticism include withdrawalist and reformist, respectively.

== Eurobarometer surveys ==
Percentage responding that their country on balance benefited from being a member of the EU at Eurobarometer 2026: 91–100% 81–90% 71–80% / 61–70% 51–60%

A survey in November 2015, conducted by TNS Opinion and Social on behalf of the European Commission, showed that, across the EU as a whole, those with a positive image of the EU were down from a high of 52% in 2007 to 37% in autumn 2015; this compares with 23% with a negative image of the EU, and 38% with a neutral image. About 43% of Europeans thought things were "going in the wrong direction" in the EU, compared with 23% who thought things were going "in the right direction" (11% "don't know"). About 32% of EU citizens tend to trust the EU as an institution, and about 55% do not tend to trust it (13% "don't know"). Distrust of the EU was highest in Greece (81%), Cyprus (72%), Austria (65%), France (65%), the United Kingdom (UK) and the Czech Republic (both 63%). Overall, more respondents distrusted their own government (66%) than they distrusted the EU (55%). Distrust of national government was highest in Greece (82%), Slovenia (80%), Portugal (79%), Cyprus (76%), and France (76%).

A Eurobarometer survey carried out four days prior to and six days after the 2016 United States presidential election revealed that the surprise victory of Donald Trump caused an increase in the popularity of the EU in Europe. The increase was strongest among the political right and among respondents who perceived their country as economically struggling.

A survey carried out in April 2018 for the European Parliament by Kantar Public consulting found that support for the EU was "the highest score ever measured since 1983". Support for the EU was up in 26 out of 28 EU countries, the exceptions being Germany and the UK, where support had dropped by about 2% since the previous survey. Almost half (48%) of the 27,601 EU citizens surveyed agreed that their voice counted in the EU, up from 37% in 2016, whereas 46% disagreed with this statement. Two-thirds (67%) of respondents felt that their country had benefited from EU membership and 60% said that being part of the bloc was a good thing, as opposed to 12% who felt the opposite. At the height of the EU's financial and economic crises in 2011, just 47% had been of the view that EU membership was a good thing. Support for EU membership was greatest in Malta (93%), Ireland (91%), Lithuania (90%), Poland (88%), Luxembourg (88%), Estonia (86%), and Denmark (84%), and lowest in Greece (57%), Bulgaria (57%), Cyprus (56%), Austria (54%), the United Kingdom (53%), and Italy (44%).

When asked which issues should be a priority for the European Parliament, survey respondents picked terrorism as the most pressing topic of discussion, ahead of youth unemployment and immigration. Not all countries shared the same priorities. Immigration topped the list in Italy (66% of citizens surveyed considered it a priority issue), Malta (65%), and Hungary (62%) but fighting youth unemployment and support for economic growth were top concerns in Spain, Greece, Portugal, Cyprus, and Croatia. Social protection of citizens was the top concern for Dutch, Swedish, and Danish respondents.

The April 2019 Eurobarometer showed that despite the challenges of the past years, and in cases such as the ongoing debate surrounding Brexit, possibly even because of it, the European sense of togetherness had not weakened, with 68% of respondents across the EU27 believing that their countries have benefited from being part of the EU, a historically high level since 1983. On the other hand, more Europeans (27%) were uncertain and saw the EU as "neither a good thing nor a bad thing", an increase in 19 countries. Despite the overall positive attitude towards the EU but in line with the uncertainty expressed by a growing number of Europeans, the feeling that things were not going in the right direction in both the EU and in their own countries had increased to 50% on EU average since September 2018.

The Eurobarometer 93.1 survey was in the field across Europe when the European Council summit reached political agreement on a pandemic economic recovery fund (later named Next Generation EU) on 21 July 2020. A comparison of Eurobarometer responses gathered before this seminal decision and interviews conducted shortly thereafter indicates that the European Council's endorsement of pandemic economic relief increased popular support of COVID-19 economic recovery aid - but only among Europeans who view EU decisionmakers as trustworthy.

== History in the European Parliament ==
General public image of EU by country according to Eurobarometer 2026
Country	Positive %	Neutral %	Negative %	Pos - Neg
Greece	29%	35%	36%	−7
Czech Republic	33%	41%	25%	+8
France	35%	39%	25%	+10
Belgium	39%	35%	26%	+13
Cyprus	36%	42%	22%	+14
Austria	42%	32%	26%	+16
Hungary	40%	39%	21%	+19
Slovenia	37%	45%	18%	+19
Slovakia	45%	32%	23%	+22
Italy	43%	37%	20%	+23
Romania	44%	34%	20%	+24
Spain	43%	37%	19%	+24
Estonia	43%	39%	17%	+26
Bulgaria	51%	24%	24%	+27
Croatia	48%	32%	20%	+28
Netherlands	50%	29%	21%	+29
Latvia	43%	43%	13%	+30
Finland	44%	42%	13%	+31
Germany	48%	36%	16%	+32
Malta	50%	35%	14%	+36
Poland	53%	34%	13%	+40
Luxembourg	57%	27%	16%	+41
Sweden	60%	29%	11%	+49
Lithuania	57%	36%	7%	+50
Denmark	65%	26%	9%	+56
Ireland	64%	28%	8%	+56
Portugal	69%	24%	6%	+63

=== 1999–2004 ===
A study analysed voting records of the Fifth European Parliament and ranked groups, concluding: "Towards the top of the figure are the more pro-European parties (PES, EPP-ED, and ALDE), whereas towards the bottom of the figure are the more anti-European parties (EUL/NGL, G/EFA, UEN and EDD)."

=== 2004–2009 ===
In 2004, 37 Members of the European Parliament (MEPs) from the UK, Poland, Denmark and Sweden founded a new European Parliament group called "Independence and Democracy" from the old Europe of Democracies and Diversities (EDD) group.

The main goal of the ID group was to reject the proposed Treaty establishing a constitution for Europe. Some delegations within the group, notably that from UKIP, also advocated the complete withdrawal of their country from the EU, while others only wished to limit further European integration.

=== 2009 elections ===
The elections of 2009 saw a significant fall in support in some areas for Eurosceptic parties, with all such MEPs from Poland, Denmark and Sweden losing their seats. In the UK, the Eurosceptic UKIP achieved second place in the election, finishing ahead of the governing Labour Party, and the British National Party (BNP) won its first-ever two MEPs. Although new members joined the ID group from Greece and the Netherlands, it was unclear whether the group would reform in the new parliament.

The ID group did reform, as the Europe of Freedom and Democracy (EFD) and is represented by 32 MEPs from nine countries.

=== 2014 elections ===
The elections of 2014 saw a big anti-establishment vote in favour of Eurosceptic parties, which took around a quarter of the seats available. Those that came first their national elections included: UKIP in the UK (the first time since 1906 that a party other than Labour or the Conservatives had won a national vote), the National Front in France, the People's Party in Denmark and Syriza in Greece. Second places were taken by Sinn Féin in Ireland and the Five Star Movement in Italy. Herman Van Rompuy, the President of the European Council, agreed following the election to re-evaluate the economic area's agenda and to launch consultations on future policy areas with the 28 member states.

=== 2019 elections ===
The elections of 2019 saw the centre-left and centre-right parties suffer significant losses including losing their overall majority, while green, pro-EU liberal, and some Eurosceptic right wing parties saw significant gains. Those that came first in their national elections included: the Brexit Party in the UK (which was only launched on 12 April 2019 by former UKIP leader Nigel Farage), the National Rally of France (formerly the National Front party until June 2018), Fidesz in Hungary, Lega in Italy, and Law and Justice in Poland. There were also notable falls in support for the Danish People's Party (previously topped the 2014 European election). Whilst Vox got elected with 3 seats, Spain's first Eurosceptic party and Belgium's Vlaams Belang rallied to gain second place after its poor 2014 result.

=== 2024 elections ===
In the elections of 2024, 24 EU countries elected at least one member of a Eurosceptic group (European Conservatives and Reformists Group, Patriots for Europe or Europe of Sovereign Nations). The three exceptions were Ireland, Malta and Slovenia.

== In EU member states ==
=== Austria ===
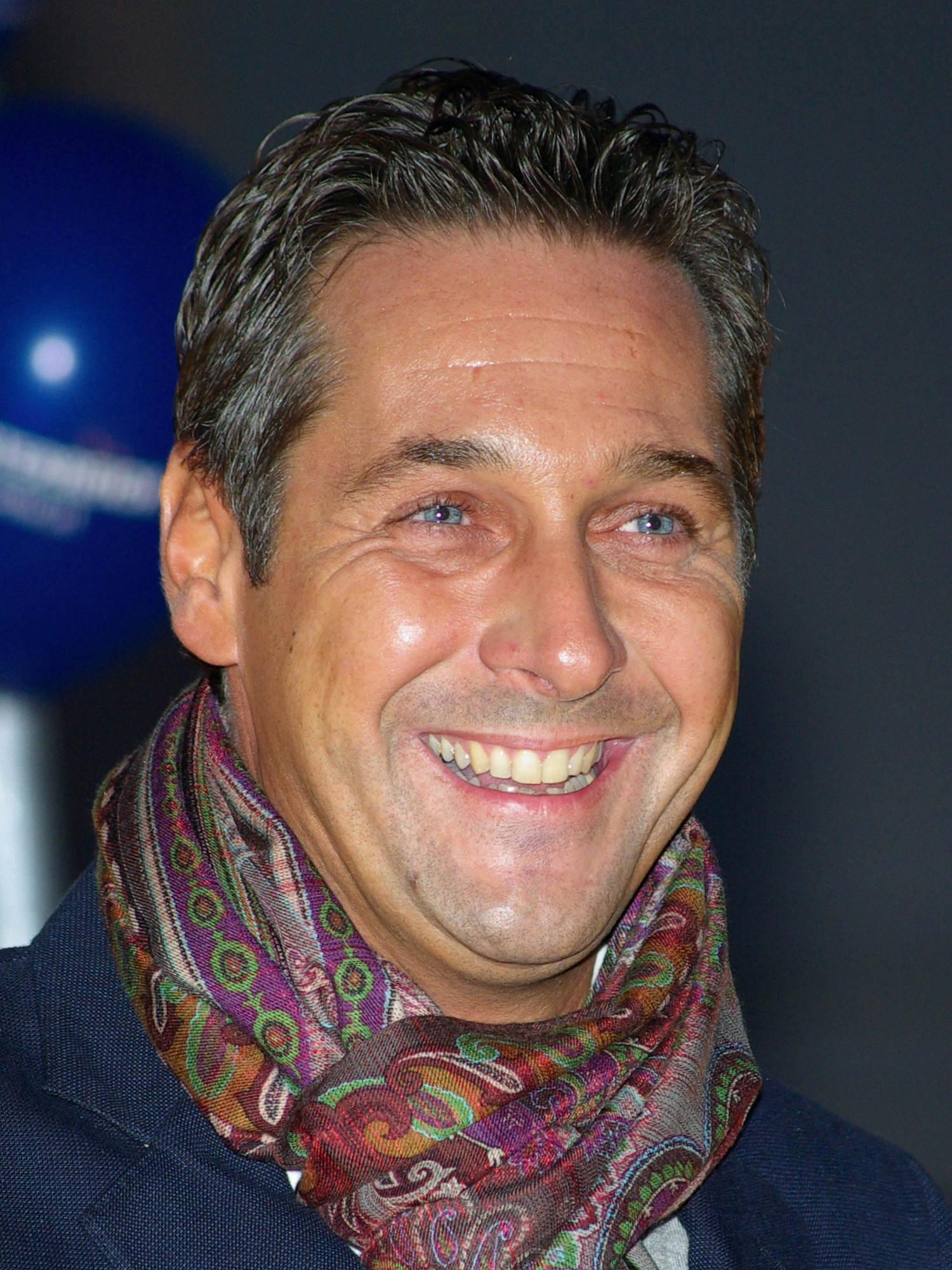
Heinz-Christian Strache, former leader of the Austrian hard Eurosceptic party FPÖ

The Freedom Party of Austria (FPÖ), established in 1956, is a right-wing populist party that mainly attracts support from young people and workers. In 1989, it changed its stance over the EU to Euroscepticism. It opposed Austria joining the EU in 1994, and opposed the introduction of the euro in 1998. The party would like to leave the EU if it threatens to develop into a country, or if Turkey joins. The FPÖ received 20–27% of the national vote in the 1990s, and more recently received 18% in 2008. Following the 2024 Austrian legislative election, it has 57/183 National Council seats, 16/60 Federal Council seats, and 6/20 European Parliament seats.

The Bündnis Zukunft Österreich (BZÖ), established in 2005, is a socially conservative party that has always held Eurosceptic elements. In 2011 the party openly supported leaving the eurozone, and in 2012 it announced that it supported a full withdrawal from the European Union. The party has also called upon a referendum on the Lisbon Treaty. In polls it generally received around 10–15%, although in one state it did receive 45% of the vote in 2009. Since the 2017 election, it has 0/183 National Council seats, 0/62 Federal Council seats, and 0/19 European Parliament seats.

Team Stronach, established in 2012, has campaigned to reform the European Union, as well as to replace the euro with an Austrian Euro. In 2012, it regularly received 8–10% support in national polls. Politicians from many different parties (including the Social Democratic Party and the BZÖ) as well as previous independents switched their allegiances to the new party upon creation. In two local elections in March 2013, it won 11% of the vote in Carinthia, and 10% of the vote in Lower Austria. It dissolved in 2017.

Ewald Stadler, a former member of FPÖ (and later of BZÖ) was very Eurosceptic, but in 2011 became a member of the European Parliament due to the Lisbon Treaty. Before Stadler accepted the seat, this led to heavy critics by Jörg Leichtfried (SPÖ) "Stadler wants to just rescue his political career" because Stadler before mentioned he would never accept a seat as MEP if this was only due to the Lisbon Treaty. On 23 December 2013 he founded a conservative and Eurosceptic party called The Reform Conservatives, although the party dissolved in 2016.

In the 2014 European Parliament election, the FPÖ increased its vote to 19.7% (up 7.0%), gaining 2 new MEPs, making a total of 4; the party came third, behind the ÖVP and the SPÖ. EU-STOP (the electoral alliance of the EU Withdrawal Party and the Neutral Free Austria Federation) polled 2.8%, gaining no seats, and the Reform Conservatives 1.2%, with Team Stronach putting up no candidates.

In the 2019 European Parliament election, the FPÖ came 3rd with 17.2% of the vote which was only slightly down on 2014 despite a scandal allegedly promising public contracts to a woman posing as a Russian backer. This precipitated the collapse of the ruling coalition and a new election being called.

=== Belgium ===
According to Eurostat, in the fall of 2018, 44% of Belgians stated that they did not trust the European Union. The main Eurosceptic party in Belgium is the far-right Vlaams Belang which is active in the Dutch-speaking part of Belgium. However, the left-wing PTB-PVDA also opposes the EU on many issues, primarily austerity and social policy, while defending a fundamental reform of the existing European framework instead of an exit from it.

In the 2014 European Parliament election, Vlaams Belang lost over half of its previous vote share, polling 4.3% (down 5.5%) and losing 1 of its 2 members of the European Parliament. Despite the presence of Eurosceptic parties in Belgium, their weight is relatively low, as Belgium is predominantly Europeanist.

In 2019, Vlaams Belang stated in its program for the 2019 European Parliament election that it opposes the creation of a European state, would like to change the Economic and Monetary Union of the EU, and to end the Schengen Area, and refuses the accession of Turkey to the EU. More widely, the euro-sceptic arguments of the Vlaams Belang are based on four pillars:

1. loss of sovereignty (for instance on economic sovereignty or on the binding legal order);
2. the financial cost of the European Union;
3. less competences for European Union;
4. leaving the euro (even though in 2019 the party has changed its line and now wants to reform the euro). During the 2019 European Parliament election in Belgium, Vlaams Belang made substantial gains in both and polled in second place in Flemish region. At the beginning of 2019, the party was enrolled in the group of European Alliance of People and Nations in the European Parliament.

The New Flemish Alliance (N-VA) is a soft Eurosceptic party in the Dutch-speaking region of Belgium. Before 2010, the N-VA was pro-European and supported the idea of a democratic European confederation, but has since altered this policy to a more sceptical stance on further European integration and now calls for more democratic transparency within the EU, changes to the EU's common asylum policy and economic reforms to the Eurozone. The N-VA has obtained 26.8% of the votes or 4 seats of the Dutch-language college out of 12 (21 MEPs for Belgium) in the 2014 European Parliament election. In April 2019, it stood in the European Conservatives and Reformists Group of the European Parliament, and can be considered a moderate Eurosceptic party.

In the French-speaking part of Belgium (Walloons), there are four parties that are Eurosceptic to a varying extent. The first one is the Nation Movement, a far-right party which was a member of the Alliance for Peace and Freedom in the European Parliament. The second one is the National Front, also a far-right party which criticizes the European bureaucracy, intends to guarantee and preserve national independence and freedom in a liberated Europe; it also reaffirms the Christian roots of Europe. The third one is the People's Party, classified as right or extreme right. In its program for the 2019 European elections, the People's Party proposed to abolish the European Commission, reduce the number of European parliamentarians and fight against the worker-posted directive. For this party, the EU must be led by a president elected by universal suffrage with clear but limited competences. It also wants to renegotiate the European Union treaties, restrict the judicial activism of the European Court of Human Rights. It declares itself against the Global Compact for Migration. The last one is the Parti libertarien. In early 2019, the party aims to reduce the powers of the European Commission, to abolish the Common Agricultural Policy, to abandon common defense projects, to simplify the exit procedure of the European Union, to reject federalism and to forbid the European Union to direct economic, fiscal or social policy,

Finally, the Workers' Party of Belgium (PTB-PVDA) is a Marxist electoral and unitary party. It intends to revise the European treaties considered too neoliberal for their enforcement of austerity measures. One of the Party's slogans is "The left that stings, against the Europe of money". The PTB-PVDA politician Marc Botenga (who went on to become the party's first MEP in 2019) published an extensive piece on EU politics in the magazine Lava in 2018. In it, Botenga criticized the EU structures, noting that the scope for economically progressive politics in the EU was limited due to its budget rules and pro-corporate frameworks. However, because the European market had already become integrated to a high extent, he also rejected an outright exit from the EU as he did not believe this would lead either to true sovereignty or to short-term economic benefits (an argument for which he cited Yanis Varoufakis). Instead of retreating into nationalism, Botenga argued that organized labour had to combat neoliberal policies on an EU-wide scale.

=== Bulgaria ===
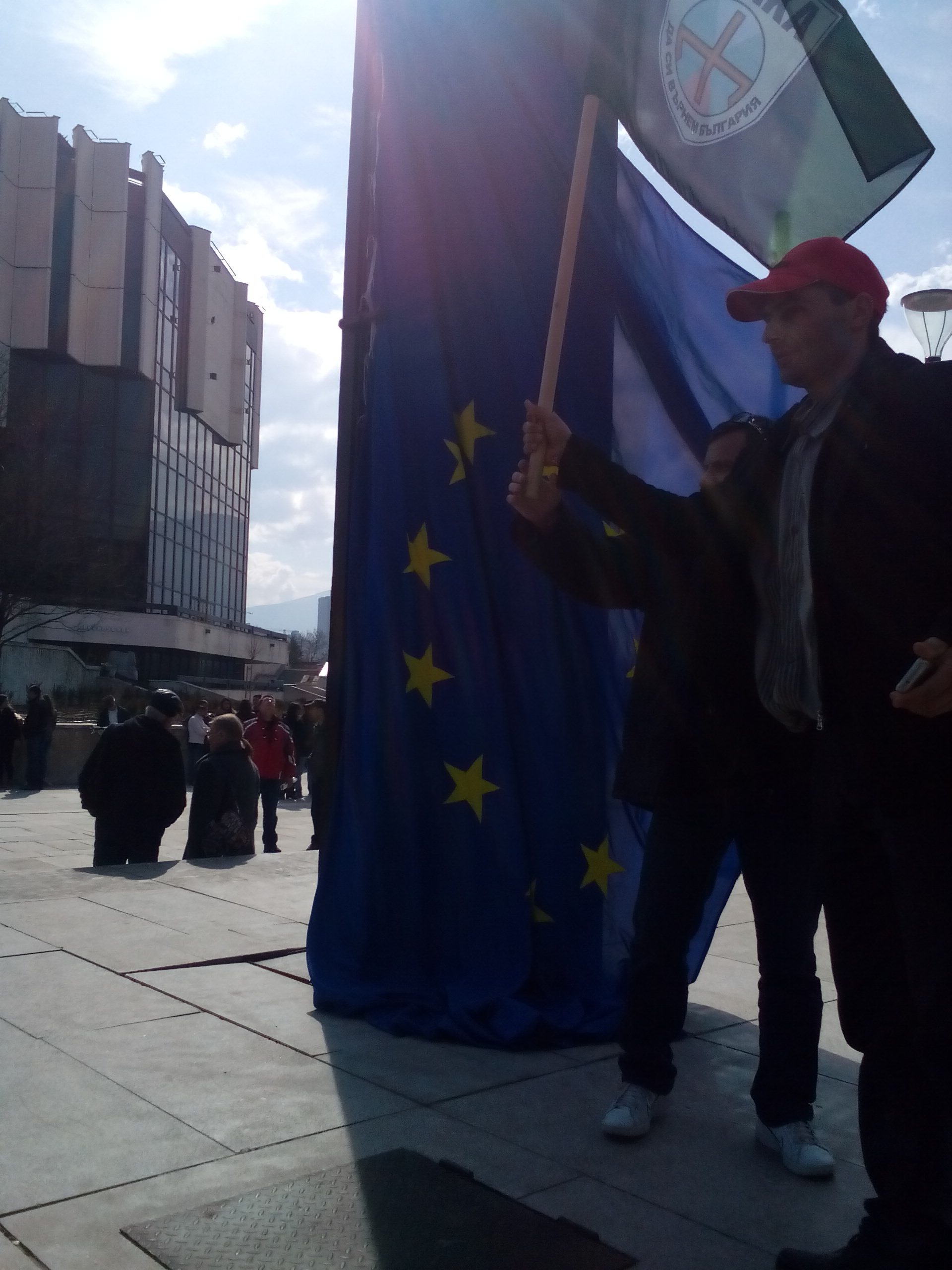
European flag in Bulgaria torn down by supporters of the Eurosceptic party Attack

Parties with mainly Eurosceptic views are NFSB, Attack, and VMRO – BND, which is a member of the Eurosceptic European Conservatives and Reformists Group.

Bulgaria's Minister of Finance, Simeon Djankov, stated in 2011 that ERM II membership to enter the Euro zone would be postponed until after the Eurozone crisis had stabilised.

In the 2014 European Parliament election Bulgaria remained overwhelmingly pro-EU, with the Eurosceptic Attack party receiving 3% of the vote, down 9%, with the splinter group National Front for the Salvation of Bulgaria taking 3; neither party secured any MEPs. A coalition between VMRO – BND and Bulgaria Without Censorship secured an MEP position for Angel Dzhambazki from IMRO, who is a hard Eurosceptic.

Followers of Eurosceptic Attack tore down and trampled the European flag on 3 March 2016 at a meeting of the party in the Bulgarian capital Sofia, dedicated to the commemoration of the 138th anniversary of the liberation of Bulgaria from the Ottoman Empire.

In the 2019 European Parliament election, Bulgaria remained overwhelmingly pro-EU with the ruling centre-right Gerb party winning with 31%, against 26% for the socialist BSP.

Since the Bulgarian political crisis, the far-right hard Eurosceptic party Revival has outplaced Attack, with it getting 14% in the 2023 Bulgarian parliamentary election.

=== Croatia ===
Parties with Eurosceptic views are mainly small right-wing parties like Croatian Party of Rights, Croatian Party of Rights dr. Ante Starčević, Croatian Pure Party of Rights, Autochthonous Croatian Party of Rights, Croatian Christian Democratic Party, and Only Croatia – Movement for Croatia.

The only parliamentary party that is vocally Eurosceptic is The Key of Croatia (formerly known as Human Shield) that won 5 out of 151 seats at the 2016 parliamentary election. Their position is generally considered to waver between hard and soft Euroscepticism; it requests thorough reform of the EU so that all member states would be perfectly equal.

In the 2019 European Parliament election, the Key of Croatia gained its first seat in the European Parliament with 6% of the vote putting it in 5th place.

The Key of Croatia would go on to lose all of its seats in the 2020 Croatian parliamentary election, and merge into the Law and Justice party in 2024. Law and Justice won a single seat (now vacant) in the 2024 parliamentary elections as part of a coalition with the Homeland Movement. Its only remaining MEPs would lose re-election in the 2024 European Parliament election.

=== Cyprus ===
Parties with mainly Eurosceptic views in Cyprus are the Progressive Party of Working People and ELAM.

In the 2019 European Parliament election, there was little change politically – the conservatives won narrowly, the ruling DISY taking two seats with 29%, followed by socialist AKEL (27.5%, two seats) with no seats taken by Eurosceptic parties.

In the 2024 European Parliament election, ELAM won its first seat.

=== Czech Republic ===
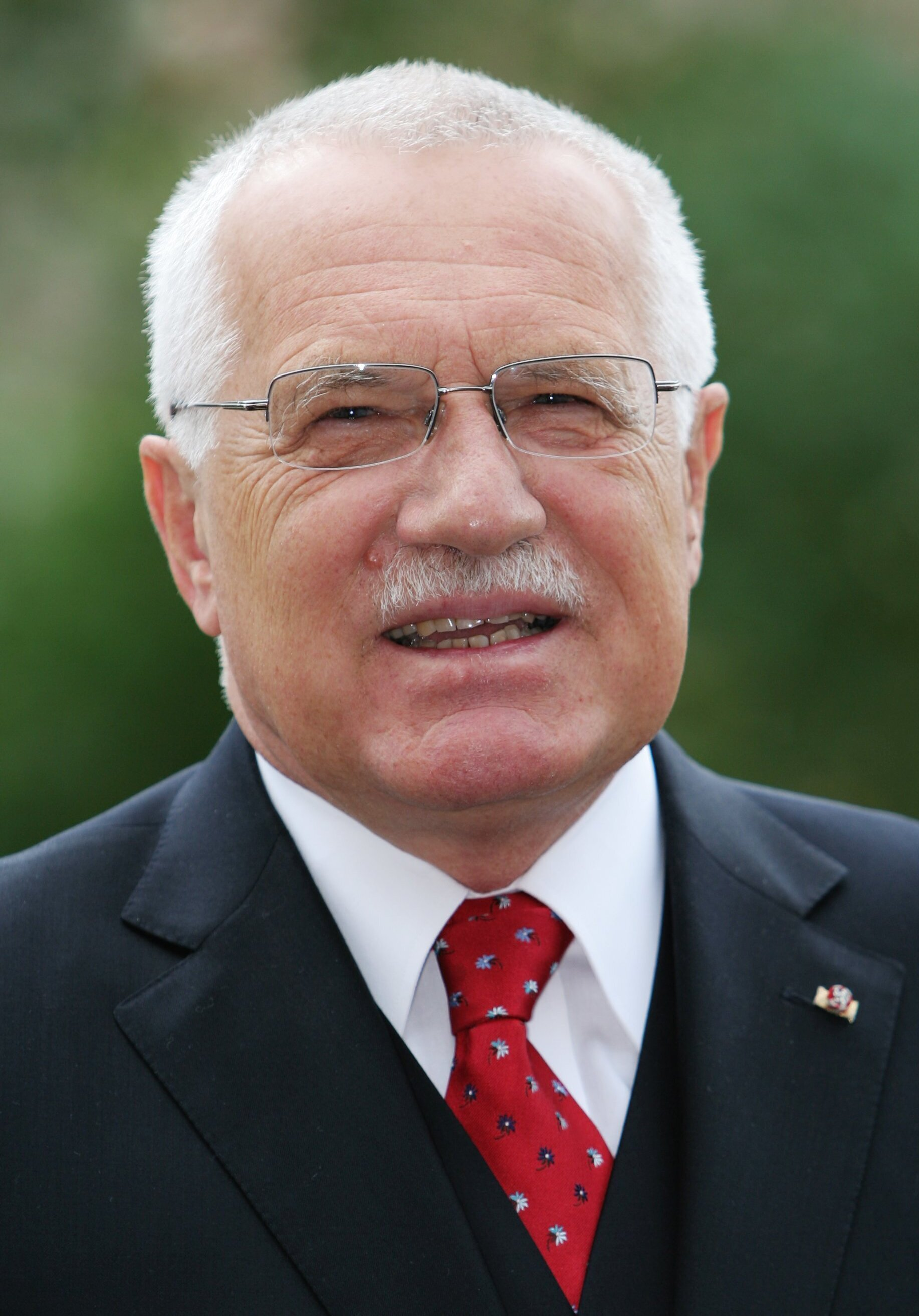
Václav Klaus, former Eurosceptic President of the Czech Republic

In May 2010, the Czech president Václav Klaus said that they "needn't hurry to enter the Eurozone".

Petr Mach, an economist, a close associate of president Václav Klaus and a member of the Civic Democratic Party between 1997 and 2007, founded the Free Citizens Party in 2009. The party aims to mainly attract dissatisfied Civic Democratic Party voters. At the time of the Lisbon Treaty ratification, they were actively campaigning against it, supported by the president Vaclav Klaus, who demanded opt-outs such as were granted to the United Kingdom and Poland, unlike the governing Civic Democratic Party, who endorsed it in the Chamber of Deputies. After the treaty has been ratified, Mach's party is in favour of withdrawing from the European Union completely. In the 2014 European Parliament election, the Free Citizens Party won one mandate and allied with UKIP in the Europe of Freedom and Direct Democracy (EFD).

The 2025 Czech legislative election brought into the Chamber of Deputies three soft eurosceptic parties, the populist ANO 2011 (ANO), the centre-right Civic Democratic Party (ODS), and the right-wing Motorists for Themselves (AUTO). The election also brought into the Chamber of Deputies one hard eurosceptic party, the far-right Freedom and Direct Democracy (SPD) with representatives of Svobodní, PRO Law Respect Expertise and Tricolour running on its list. The hard eurosceptic Communist Party of Bohemia and Moravia (KSČM) did not enter the Chamber of Deputies.

=== Denmark ===
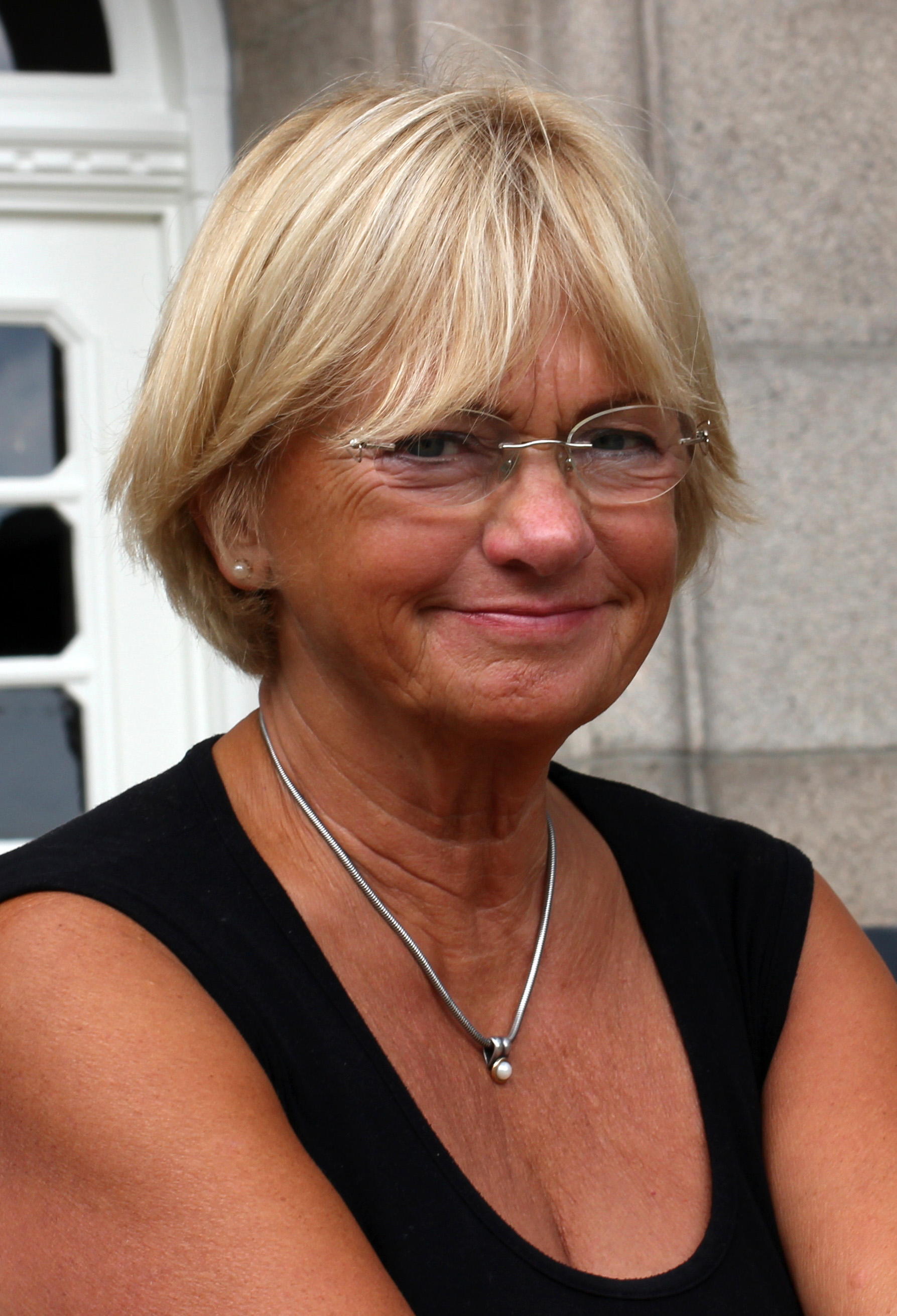
Pia Kjærsgaard, member (and former leader) of the hard Eurosceptic party Danish People's Party (Dansk Folkeparti), the fifth-largest represented in the Danish parliament and the fifth-most represented in the European Parliament

The People's Movement against the EU only takes part in European Parliament elections and has one member in the European Parliament. The soft Eurosceptic June Movement, originally a split-off from the People's Movement against the EU, existed from 1992 to 2009.

In the Danish Parliament, the Red-Green Alliance previously advocated withdrawal from the EU, but in March 2019, the party announced it would no longer campaign for a referendum to leave the EU, pointing to Brexit illustrating the need for clarity before withdrawal can be considered. The Danish People's Party also advocates withdrawal, but says it supports some EU structures such as the internal market, and supported the EU-positive Liberal-Conservative coalition between 2001 and 2011 and again from 2015 to 2019.

The Socialist People's Party, minorities within the Social Liberal Party and Social Democratic Party, and some smaller parties were against accession to the European Union in 1972. Still in 1986, these parties advocated a no vote in the Single European Act referendum. Later, the Social Liberal Party changed to a strongly EU-positive party, and EU opposition within the Social Democratic Party faded. The Socialist People's Party were against the Amsterdam Treaty in 1998 and Denmark's joining the euro in 2000, but has become increasingly EU-positive, for example when MEP Margrete Auken left the European United Left–Nordic Green Left and joined The Greens–European Free Alliance in 2004.

In the 2014 European Parliament election, the Danish People's Party came first by a large margin with 27% of the vote, gaining 2 extra seats for a total of 4 MEPs. The People's Movement against the EU polled 8%, retaining its single MEP.

In the 2019 European Parliament election, the Danish People's Party lost around two-thirds of their previous vote share dropping from 4 seats to just 1. The People's Movement against the EU lost their seat and the Red-Green Alliance got one seat.

The 2019 Danish general election saw the emergence of a new hard Eurosceptic party Nye Borgerlige which supports Denmark leaving the EU. The party won four seats in parliament.

=== Estonia ===
The Independence Party and Centre Party were against accession to the EU, but only the Independence Party still wants Estonia to withdraw from the EU. The Conservative People's Party (EKRE) also has some Eurosceptic policies and increased its vote share from 4% in 2014 to 13% in the 2019 European Elections winning one seat.

=== Finland ===
The largest Eurosceptic party in Finland is the Finns Party. In the European Parliament election, 2014, the Finns Party increased their vote share by 3% to 13%, adding a second MEP. With their 39 seats, the Finns Party are also the second-biggest party in the 200-seat Finnish Eduskunta.

In the European Parliament election, 2019, the Finns Party increased their vote share slightly from 13% to 14% and retained their 2 seats.

In its latest party platform written in 2019, the Finns Party is strongly opposed to further EU integration. The party proposes introducing a parallel currency within Finland in tandem with the Euro in order to phase out Finnish membership of the Eurozone and argues that while Finland is needed in the short-term in the European Parliament to defend Finland's interests, the country should also enact policies to help gradually withdraw Finland from the EU. During the 2018 Finnish presidential election, the Finns Party candidate Laura Huhtasaari stated that her campaign would support exiting the EU.

=== France ===
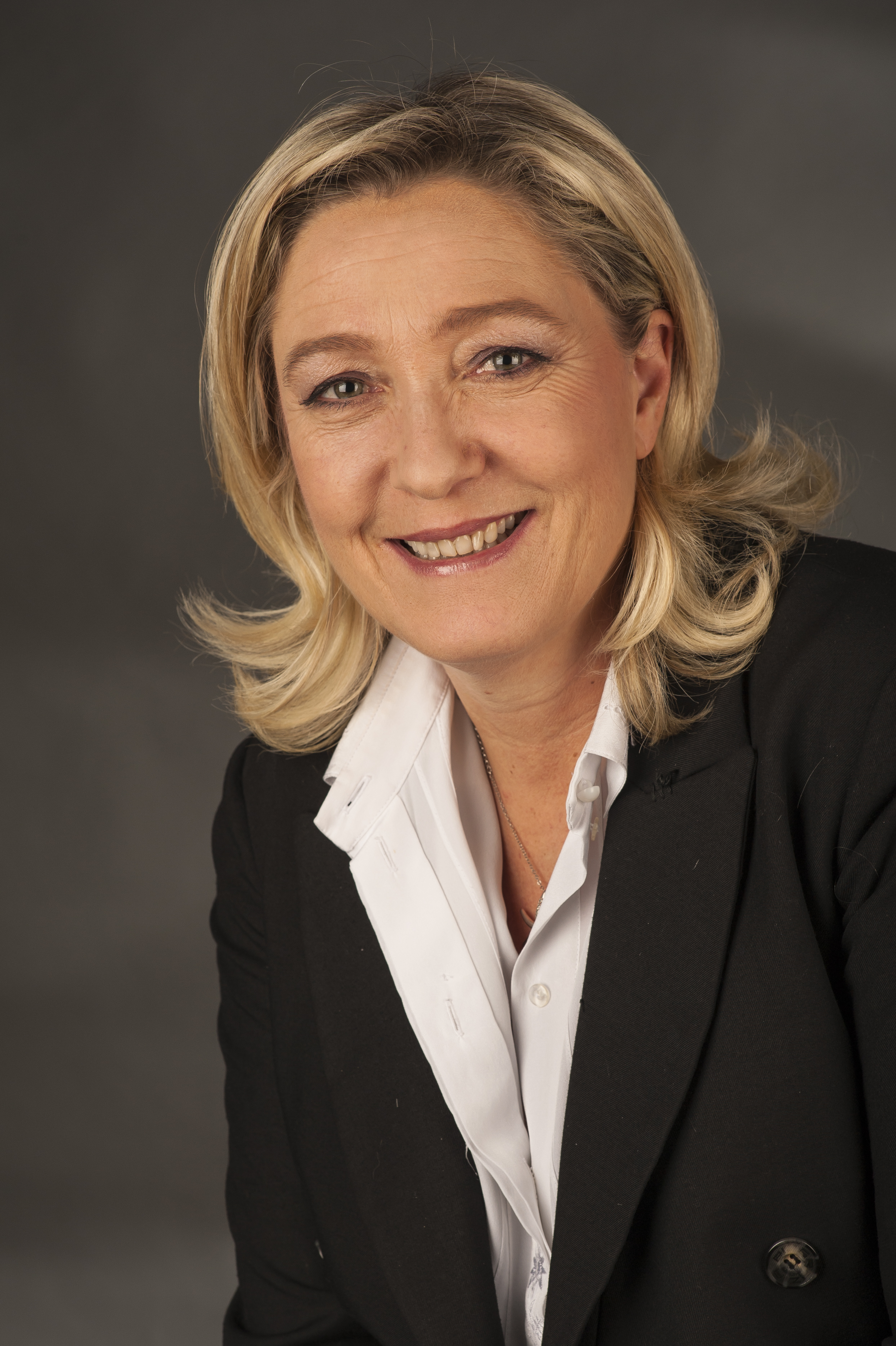
Marine Le Pen, prominent French MEP, former leader and former presidential candidate of the National Front (France) and of the Europe of Nations and Freedom group

In France there are multiple parties that are Eurosceptic to different degrees, varying from advocating less EU intervention in national affairs, to advocating outright withdrawal from the EU and the Eurozone. These parties belong to all sides of the political spectrum, so the reasons for their Euroscepticism may differ. In the past many French people appeared to be uninterested in such matters, with only 40% of the French electorate voting in the 2009 European Parliament elections.

Right-wing Eurosceptic parties include the Gaullist Debout la République, and Mouvement pour la France, which was part of Libertas, a pan-European Eurosceptic party. In the 2009 European Parliament elections, Debout la République received 1.8% of the national vote, and Libertas 4.8%. In a similar way to some moderate parties, the French right and far-right in general are naturally opposed to the EU, as they criticise France's loss of political and economic sovereignty to a supranational entity. Some of these hard Eurosceptic parties include the Popular Republican Union and The Patriots and formerly the Front National (FN). Popular Republican Union seek France's withdrawal from the EU and the euro as well as France's withdrawal from NATO. The FN received 33.9% of the votes in the 2017 French presidential election, making it the largest Eurosceptic party in France. In June 2018, the National Front was renamed as National Rally (RN) and in 2019 dropped support for France leaving the European Union and the Eurozone from its manifesto, instead calling for "reform from within" the union.

Eurosceptic parties on the left in France tend to criticise what they see as the neoliberal agenda of the EU, as well as the elements of its structure which are undemocratic and seen as top-down. These parties include the Parti de Gauche and the French Communist Party, which formed the Front de Gauche for the 2009 European Parliament elections and received 6.3% of the votes. The leader of the Left Front defends a complete reform of the Monetary Union, rather than the withdrawal of France from the Eurozone. Some of the major far-left Eurosceptic parties in France include the New Anticapitalist Party which received 4.8% and Lutte Ouvrière which received 1.2%. The Citizen and Republican Movement, a left-wing Eurosceptic and souverainist party, have not participated in any elections for the European Parliament.

The party Chasse, Pêche, Nature & Traditions, is an agrarianist Eurosceptic party that says it is neither left nor right.

In the European Parliament election, 2014, the National Front won the elections with 24.9% of the vote, a swing of 18.6%, winning 24 seats, up from 3 previously. The former French President François Hollande had called for the EU to be reformed and for a scaling back of its power.

In the European Parliament election, 2019, the renamed National Rally won the elections with 23.3% of the vote, winning 22 seats, down from 23 previously when their vote share was 24.9%.

=== Germany ===
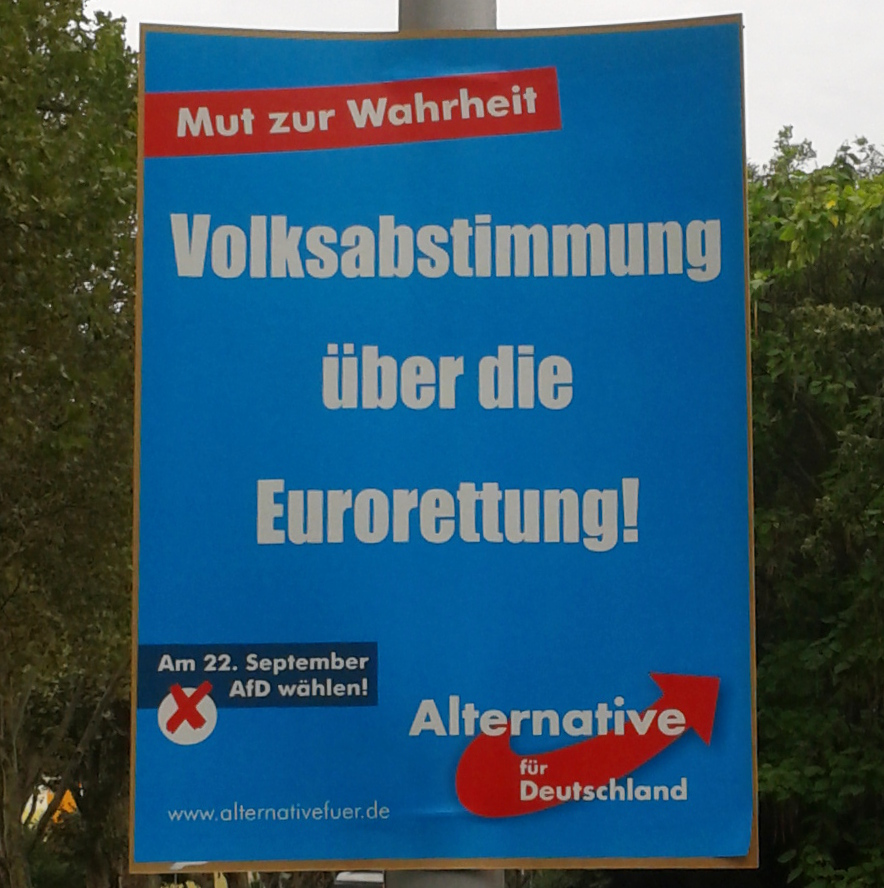
"Referendum on saving the euro!" 2013 poster from the Alternative for Germany (AfD) regarding Germany's financial contributions during the Eurozone crisis

Due to Chancellor Angela Merkel often stating There is no alternative in relation to her responses to the Euro area crisis, the change of attitude towards nuclear power phase-out in 2010 and again 2011, immigration and other policies, the German term alternativlos (literally "alternative-less"; without alternative) became Germany's "un-word of the year" in 2010. In February 2013, the Alternative for Germany (AfD) was founded, Germany's largest Eurosceptic party.

Initially the AfD was a soft Eurosceptic "Party of Professors" and economists, that considered itself pro-Europe and pro-EU, but opposed the euro, which it believed had undermined European integration, and called for reforms to the Eurozone. Despite being only a few months old, and having no candidates in half of the 299 constituencies, the new party almost won seats in the 2013 German Federal Election.

In the European Parliament election, 2014, the Alternative for Germany came 5th with 7% of the vote, winning 7 seats and becoming a member of the Eurosceptic European Conservatives and Reformists Group. The AfD also went on to take seats in three state legislatures in the Autumn of 2014.

The party became purely Eurosceptic in July 2015, with the 2015 European migrant crisis emerging, when an internal split occurred and leader Prof. Bernd Lucke left to found a new soft Eurosceptic splinter party called Alliance for Progress and Renewal that faded away. Under Frauke Petry's AfD leadership and a more hard-line approach to the European Union, including its calling for an end for German Eurozone membership, withdrawal from EU common asylum policies and significantly reducing the power of the EU with some AfD members supporting a complete exit from the EU altogether.

In the European Parliament election, 2019, the Alternative for Germany increased their vote share from 7% and 7 seats to 11% and 11 seats, rising with 15% and 15 seats to second place in 2024 as many small parties won shares and seats as the %5 threshold does not apply. In early September 2024, the AfD of Björn Höcke with 32.8% emerged as the largest party in the state election of Thuringia and was a close second in Saxony. Under these circumstances the 2024 Brandenburg state election developed into a two horse race, between AfD, and anti-AfD voters rallying behind SPD. As a result, apart from the new BSW winning seats, only the CDU avoided an Electoral wipeout, ending up as the fourth and smallest party in that state.

After a near miss in 2013, a somewhat matured AfD was elected into the German Parliament as Leader of the Opposition with 94 seats in September 2017., followed by a setback in the 2021 German Federal Election with lockdowns hampering their campaign. In the February 2025 snap election AfD won 20.8% of the vote, 152 seats and second rank, while the Social Democratic Party (SPD) of Chancellor Olaf Scholz was dropped to third rank with just 16.4%, their worst result since 1887, while FDP and BSW suffered wipeouts. Since September 2025, in Opinion polling for the next German federal election, AfD is leading ahead of the CDU/CSU of chancellor Merz.

=== Greece ===
Golden Dawn, Communist Party of Greece (KKE), Greek Solution, ANEL, Course of Freedom, Popular Unity, and LAOS have been the main Eurosceptic parties in Greece. According to the London School of Economics, Greece used to be the second most Eurosceptic country in the European Union, with 50% of Greeks thinking that their country has not benefited at all from the EU (only behind the UK). Meanwhile, 33% of Greeks viewed Greek membership in EU as a good thing, marginally ahead of the UK. 81% of Greeks felt that the EU was going in the wrong direction. These figures represented a major increase in Euroscepticism in Greece since 2009.

In June 2012, the Eurosceptic parties in Greece that were represented in the parliament before the Election in January 2015 (ANEL, Golden Dawn, KKE) got 45.8% of the votes and 40.3% of the seats in the parliament. In the legislative election of January 2015 the pro-European (left and right-wing) parties (ND, PASOK, Potami, KIDISO, EK and Prasinoi-DIMAR) got 43.3% of the votes. The Eurosceptic parties got 54.6%. The Eurosceptic left (KKE, ANTARSYA-MARS and KKE (M–L)/M–L KKE) got 42.6% of the votes and the Eurosceptic right (Golden Dawn, ANEL and LAOS) got 12.1% of the votes, with Syriza ahead with 36.3%. The Eurosceptic parties got 194 seats in the new parliament and the pro-EU parties got 106 seats.

According to the polls conducted in June and July 2015 (12 polls), the Eurosceptic left would get on average 48.0% (excluding extraparliamentary parties as ANTARSYA-MARS and KKE (m–l)/ML-KKE), the parliamentary pro-EU parties (Potami, New Democracy and PASOK) would get 33.8%, the extra-parliamentary (not represented in the Hellenic Parliament) pro-EU parties (KIDISO and EK) would get 4.4% and the Eurosceptic right would get 10.2% (excluding extraparliamentary parties, such as LAOS, not displayed on recent opinion polls). The soft Eurosceptic parties would get 42.3%, the hard Eurosceptic parties (including KKE, ANEL and Golden Dawn) would get 15.9%, and the pro-EU parties (including extra-parliamentary parties displayed on opinion polls) would get 38.3% of the votes.

In the European Parliament election, 2014, Syriza won the election with 26.6% of the vote (a swing of 21.9%) taking 6 seats (up 5), with Golden Dawn coming 3rd taking 3 seats, the Communist Party taking 2 seats and the Independent Greeks gaining their first ever seat. Syriza's leader Tsipras said he's not anti-European and does not want to leave the euro. According to The Economist, Tsipras is willing to negotiate with Greece's European partners, and it is believed a Syriza victory could encourage radical leftist parties across Europe. Alexis Tsipras vowed to reverse many of the austerity measures adopted by Greece since a series of bailouts began in 2010, at odds with the Eurogroup's positions. The government coalition in Greece was composed by Syriza and ANEL (right-wing hard Eurosceptic party, led by Panos Kammenos, who is the current Minister of Defence).

Euroscepticism has softened in Greece as the economy improved. According to a research in early 2018, 68% of Greeks judge as positive the participation of Greece in the EU (instead of 53.5% in 2017).

In the European Parliament election, 2019, the New Democracy movement, beat the ruling left-wing Syriza formation with 33.1% and 23.8% of the vote respectively, maintaining Syriza's 6 seats and prompting the Prime Minister Alexis Tsipras to call a legislative election on 7 July 2019. In this election, which was won by ND, the pro-European parties (ND, SYRIZA, KINAL, MeRA25, and the extra-parliamentary Union of Centrists and Recreate Greece) got 84.9% of the vote and the Eurosceptic parties (KKE, Greek Solution, the extraparliamentary Golden Dawn and a host of other small mainly left-wing parties) got 15.1%. That drastic change in the balance is mostly the result of SYRIZA abandoning Euroscepticism.

=== Hungary ===
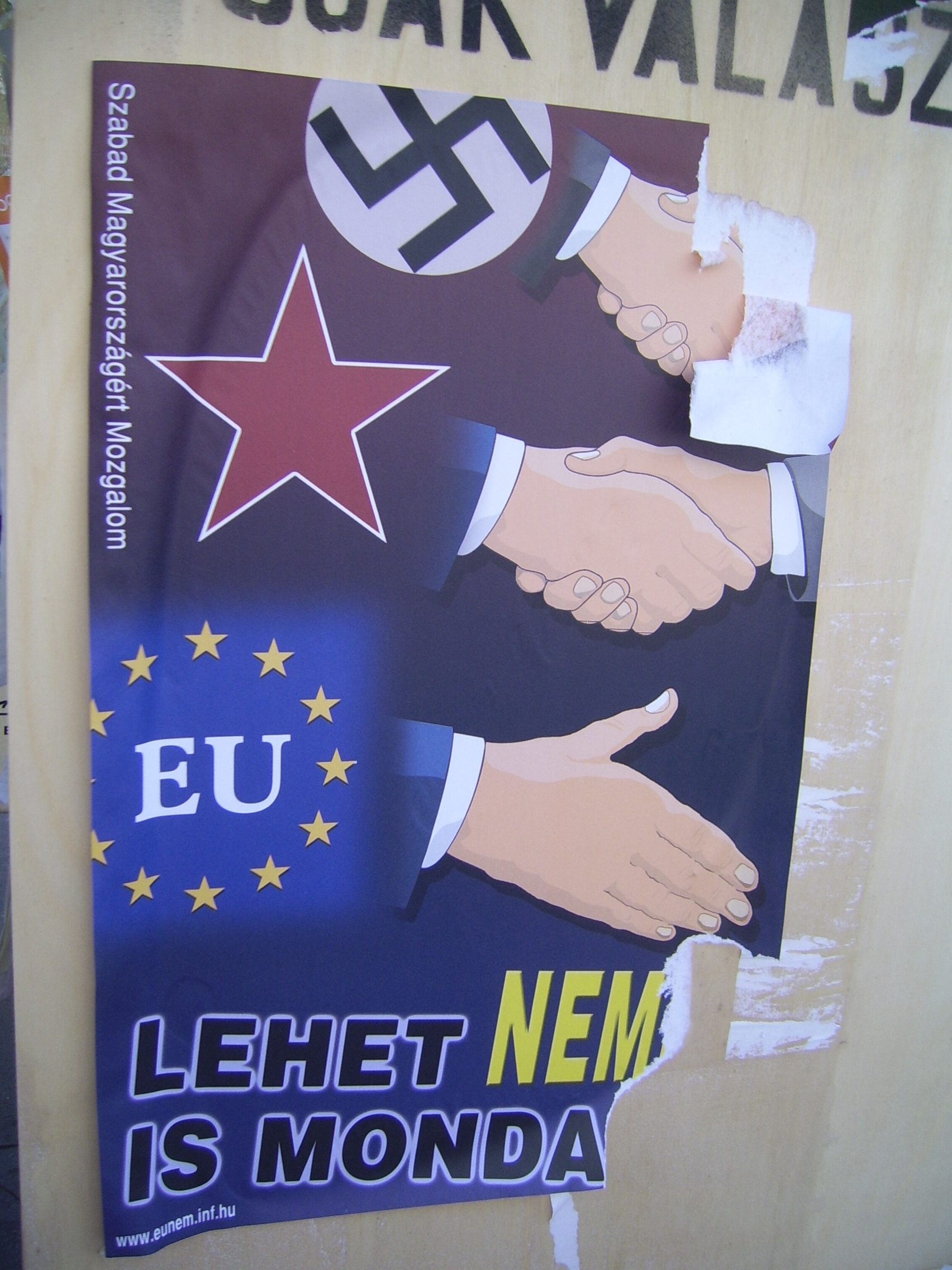
An anti-EU poster in Hungary

Viktor Orbán was the soft Eurosceptic Prime Minister of Hungary for the national-conservative Fidesz Party from 2010-2026. Another Eurosceptic party that was present in Hungary was Jobbik, which until around 2016, was identified as a radical and far-right party. Those far-right factions, who left Jobbik, decided to form the Our Homeland Movement party.

In 2015, 39% of the Hungarian population had a positive image of the EU, 20% had a negative image, and 40% neutral (1% "Don't know").

In the 2014 Hungarian parliamentary election, Fidesz got 44.5% of the votes, Jobbik got 20.5% of the votes and the communist Hungarian Workers' Party got 0.6% of the votes. Thus at the time, Eurosceptic parties in Hungary obtained 65.7% of the votes, one of the highest figures in Europe.

The green-liberal Politics Can Be Different (Lehet Más a Politika, LMP) classifies as a soft or reformist Eurosceptic party given its self-professed euro-critical stance. During the European parliamentary campaign of 2014 party Co-president András Schiffer described LMP as having a pronounced pro-integration position on environmental, wage and labour policy as supporting member state autonomy on the self-determination of local communities concerning land resources. So as to combat the differentiated integration of the multi-speed Europe which discriminates against Eastern and Southern member states, LMP would like to initiate an eco-social market economy within the union.

In the European Parliament election, 2019, Fidesz consolidated their position by increasing their vote share to 51.5% and adding a seat to take their tally to 13. Former Eurosceptic (now pro-European) Jobbik dropped to 6.3% of the votes, losing 2 of its 3 seats. The Momentum Movement, a newly created pro-European party, came 3rd with 9.3% of the vote, with the strongly pro-European Democratic Coalition coming second with 16.1% of the vote. Our Homeland Movement got 3.3% of the votes, gaining no seats.

=== Ireland ===
Euroscepticism is a minority view in Ireland, with opinion polls from 2016 to 2018 indicating growing support for EU membership, moving from 70% to 92% in that time.

The Irish people initially voted against ratifying the Nice and Lisbon Treaties. Following renegotiations, second referendums on both were passed with approximately 2:1 majorities in both cases. Some commentators and smaller political groups questioned the validity of the Irish Government's decision to call second referendums.

The left-wing Irish republican party Sinn Féin expresses soft Eurosceptic positions on the current structure of the European Union and the direction in which it is moving. The party expresses, "support for Europe-wide measures that promote and enhance human rights, equality and the all-Ireland agenda", but has a "principled opposition" to a European superstate. In its manifesto for the 2015 UK general election, Sinn Féin pledged that the party would campaign for the UK to stay within the EU. In the 2019 European Parliament election, Sinn Féin won one seat and 11.7% of the vote, down 7.8%.

The Socialist Party, a Trotskyist organisation, supports Ireland leaving the EU and supported the Brexit result. It argues that the European Union is institutionally capitalist and neoliberal. The Socialist Party campaigned against the Lisbon and Nice Treaties and favours the foundation of an alternative Socialist European Union.

=== Italy ===
The Five Star Movement (M5S), an anti-establishment movement founded by comedian Beppe Grillo, originally set itself out as a Eurosceptic party. The M5S received 25.5% of vote in the 2013 general election, becoming the largest anti-establishment and Eurosceptic party in Europe. The party used to advocate a non-binding referendum on the withdrawal of Italy from the Eurozone (but not from the European Union) and the return to the lira. Since then, the party has toned down its eurosceptic rhetoric and such policy was rejected in 2018, and the M5S's leader has since stated that the "European Union is the Five Star Movement's home", clarifying that the party wants Italy to stay in the EU, even though it remains critical of some of its treaties. The M5S's popular support is distributed all across Italy: in the 2018 general election the party won 32.7% of the popular vote nationwide, and was particularly successful in central and southern Italy.

A party that retains a Eurosceptic identity is the Northern League (LN), a regionalist movement led by Matteo Salvini favouring Italy's exit from the Eurozone and the re-introduction of the lira. When in government, Lega approved the Treaty of Lisbon. The party won 6.2% of the vote in the 2014 European Parliament elections, but two of its leading members are presidents of Lombardy and Veneto (where Lega gained 40.9% of the vote in 2015).

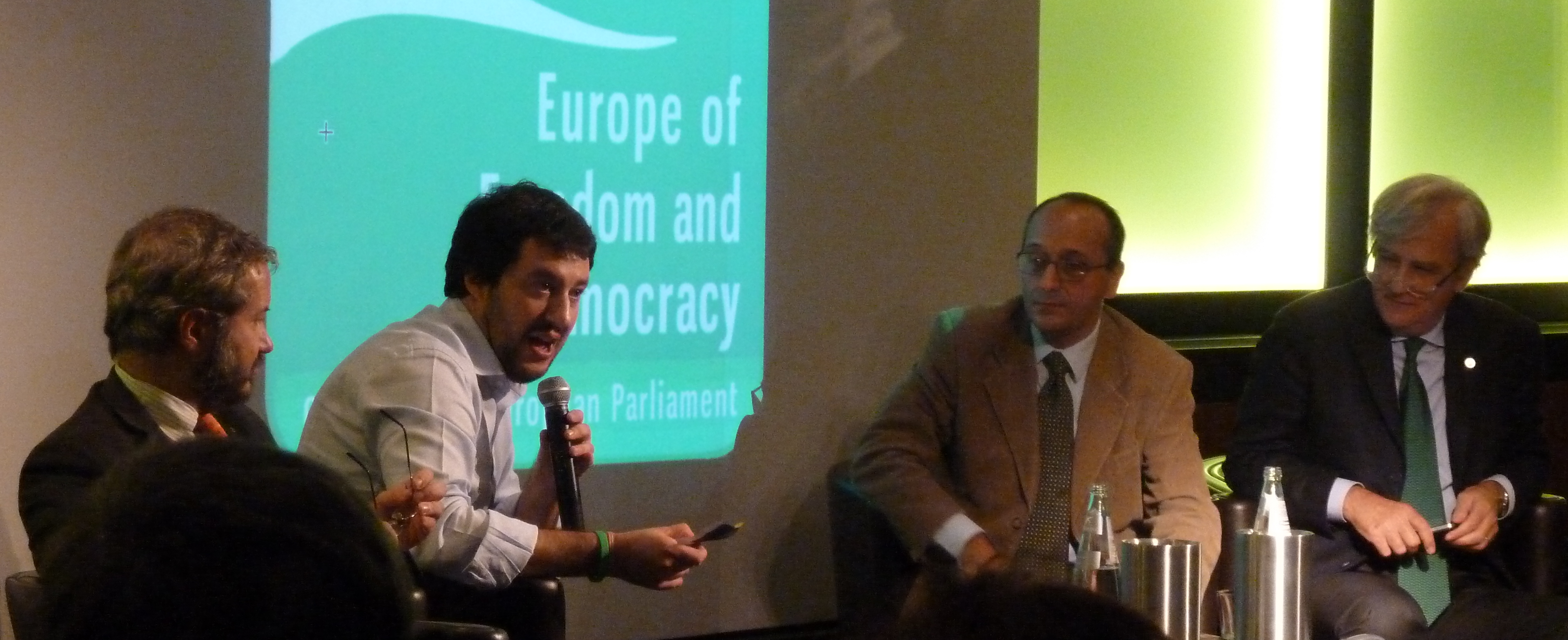
Matteo Salvini with the Eurosceptic economists Claudio Borghi Aquilini, Alberto Bagnai and Antonio Maria Rinaldi during the No Euro Day in Milan, 2013. All economists were later elected MPs in different assemblies.

In the 2014 European Parliament election the Five Star Movement came second, with 17 seats and 21.2% of the vote after contesting EP seats for the first time. Northern League had five seats and The Other Europe with Tsipras had three seats.

Other minor Eurosceptic organizations include right-wing political parties (e.g., Brothers of Italy, Tricolour Flame, New Force, National Front, CasaPound, National Movement for Sovereignty, the No Euro Movement), far-left political parties (e.g., the Communist Party of Marco Rizzo, the Italian Communist Party, the Communist Party of Popular Unity, and the political movement Power to the People) and other political movements (e.g., the Sovereignist Front, MMT Italy). In addition, the European Union is criticized (especially for the austerity and the creation of the euro) by some left-wing thinkers, like the trade unionist Giorgio Cremaschi and the journalist Paolo Barnard, and some academics, such as Alberto Bagnai the philosopher Diego Fusaro.

According to the Standard Eurobarometer 87 conducted by the European Commission in spring 2017, 48% of Italians tend not to trust the European Union compared to 36% of Italians who do.

In the 2019 European election, the Italian Eurosceptic and souverainist right-wing, represented in large part by the League, increased its number of seats in the EP, but was not assigned any presidency in the committees of the European Parliament. Despite its national political alliance with the League during the Conte Cabinet, the Five Star Movement voted for Ursula von der Leyen, member of pro-EU Christian Democratic Union of Germany, as President of the European Commission.

In July 2020, senator Gianluigi Paragone formed Italexit, a new political party with a main goal to withdraw Italy from the European Union.

=== Latvia ===
The National Alliance (For Fatherland and Freedom/LNNK/All for Latvia!), Union of Greens and Farmers and For Latvia from the Heart are parties that are described by some political commentators as bearing soft Eurosceptic views. A small hard Eurosceptic party Eurosceptic Party of Action exists, but it has failed to gain any administrative seats throughout history of its existence.

=== Lithuania ===
The Order and Justice party had mainly Eurosceptic views.

=== Luxembourg ===
The Alternative Democratic Reform Party is a soft Eurosceptic party. It is a member of the Alliance of European Conservatives and Reformists.

=== Malta ===
In the 2000s, the Labour Party (MLP/PL) was vehemently opposed to Malta entering the European Union. Instead of EU membership, the PL was in favour of a partnership with the EU in the broader context of the Euro-Mediterranean Partnership (Euromed). After a long battle, a majority of the electorate voted to join the EU in the 2003 referendum and the Nationalist Party (PN) led by Eddie Fenech Adami, which took a pro-European stance, won the subsequent election. This led Malta to become one of the states to enter the European Union on 1 May 2004.

After Malta joined the EU, the PL under Joseph Muscat quickly moved towards a strongly pro-European stance. Current-day Eurosceptic forces in Maltese politics are far-right parties such as the Maltese Brotherhood and Imperium Europa.

According to Mark Harwood, Euroscepticism in Malta has moved from being a leftist stance in the early 2000s, connected to opposition to the EU's forced adoption of neoliberal policies such as austerity, towards a position that is more concerned with far-right talking points such as anti-immigrant sentiment in the 2010s.

=== Netherlands ===
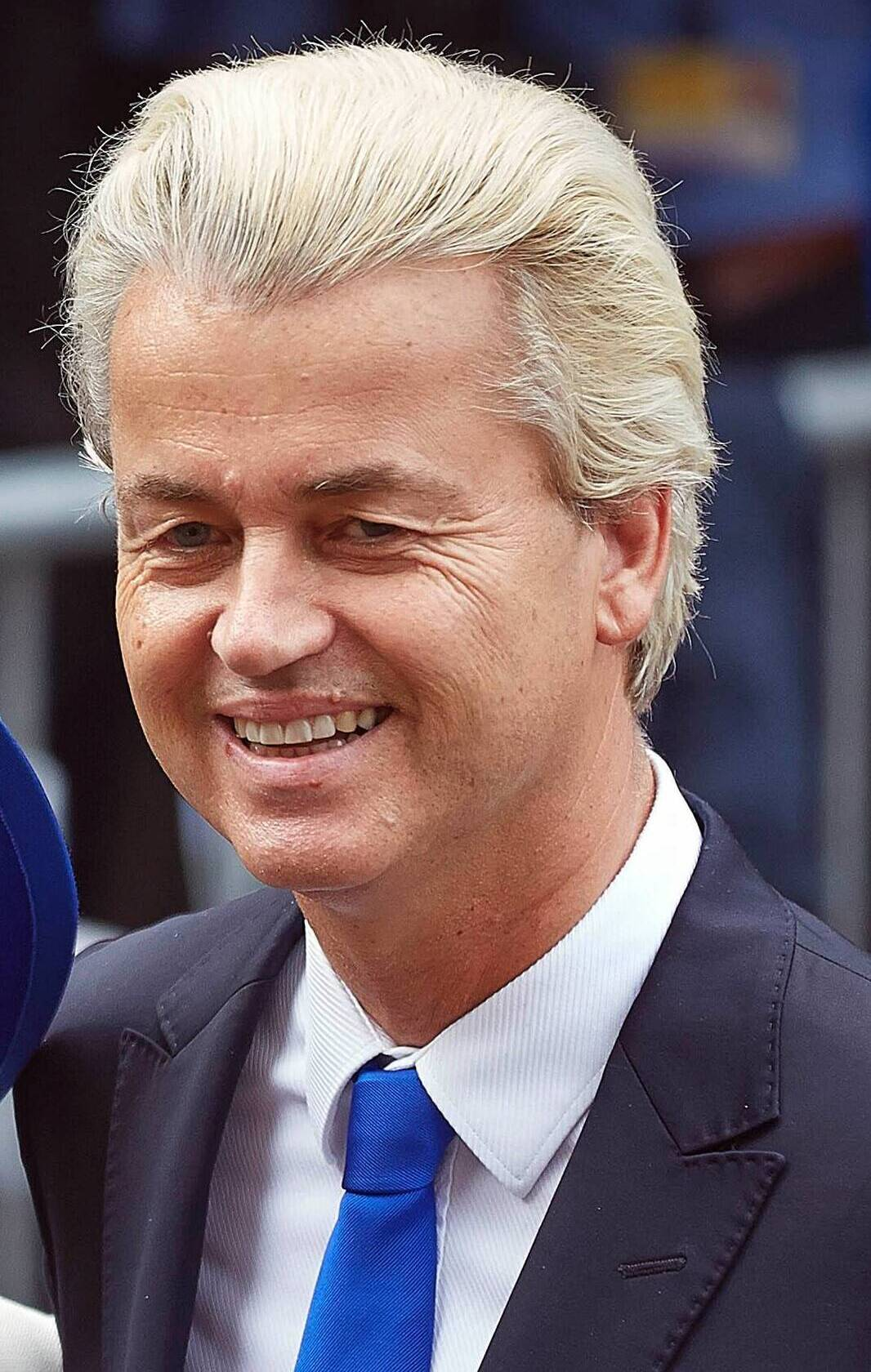
Geert Wilders, leader of the Party for Freedom, a hardline Dutch Eurosceptic party that has been criticised as anti-Polish and Islamophobic

Historically, the Netherlands have been a very pro-European country, being one of the six founding members of the European Coal and Steel Community in 1952, and campaigning with much effort to include the United Kingdom into the Community in the 1970s and others after that. It has become slightly more Eurosceptic in the 2000s, rejecting the European Constitution in 2005 and complaining about the relatively high financial investment into the Union or the democratic deficit amongst other issues.

A number of hard and soft eurosceptic parties have politicians elected to the Dutch House of Representatives and European Parliament which include:

- The nationalist Party for Freedom (founded in 2006) is a hard-eurosceptic party and wants the Netherlands to leave the EU in its entirety, because it believes the EU is undemocratic, costs money and cannot close the borders for immigrants.
- The conservative and right-wing populist Forum for Democracy (FvD) party was originally founded by Thierry Baudet as a think tank to campaign against the Association Agreement between the European Union and Ukraine. In 2016, the FvD was established as a fully fledged party. It is opposed to many of the policies of the European Union and calls for a referendum on Dutch membership in which it would endorse withdrawal.
- The conservative-liberal JA21 party (founded in 2021 as a splinter from the FvD) is opposed to Dutch participation several European Union agreements, including its immigration and asylum policies, and believes Dutch identity and self-determination should be prioritized above the EU. It supports Dutch withdrawal from the Eurozone and for the Netherlands to exit EU treaties it deems a threat to national sovereignty.
- The Socialist Party believes the European Union has already brought Europe 50 years of peace and prosperity and argues that European co-operation is essential for tackling global problems like climate change and international crime. The SP opines that the current Union is dominated by the big businesses and the big countries, while the labour movement, consumer organisations and smaller companies are often left behind. "Neoliberal" measures have supposedly increased social inequality, and perhaps the Union is expanding too fast and taking on too much power in issues that should be dealt with on a national level.
- The conservative Protestant Reformed Political Party and the Christian Union favour co-operation within Europe, but reject a superstate, especially one that is dominated by Catholics, or that infringes on religious rights and/or privileges.
- The pensioner's interest party 50PLUS is moderately Eurosceptic.
- The ecologist Party for the Animals favours European co-operation, but believes the current EU does not respect animal rights enough and should have a more active policy on environment protection.
- The agrarian and rural interests Farmer–Citizen Movement (BBB) was founded in 2019 and is a soft-eurosceptic party. It supports membership of the EU for economic and trade purposes, but argues the political power of the EU should be stripped back so the bloc is closer to the model of the former EEC, wants reforms made to the Eurozone and is against the EU becoming a superstate.

A prominent former Eurosceptic party in the Netherlands was the Pim Fortuyn List (LPF) established by politician and academic Pim Fortuyn in 2002. The party campaigned to reduce Dutch financial contributions to the EU, was against Turkish membership and opposed what it saw as the excessive bureaucracy and threat to national sovereignty posed by the EU. During the 2002 general election, the LPF polled in second place with 17% of the vote. Following the assassination of Fortuyn in the run-up to the election, support for the party declined soon after and it was disbanded in 2008 with many of its former supporters transferring to the Party for Freedom.

Despite these concerns, in 2014 the majority of the Dutch electorate continued to support parties that favour ongoing European integration: the Social Democrats, the Christian Democrats, the Liberals, but most of all the (Liberal) Democrats.

In 2016, a substantial majority in a low-turnout referendum rejected the ratification of an EU trade and association treaty with Ukraine.

In the 2019 European Parliament election, Eurosceptic parties had mixed results with Geert Wilders' Party for Freedom losing all 4 of its seats taking only 3.5% of the vote. The new Forum for Democracy established in late 2016 took 11.0% of the vote and entered the European Parliament with 3 seats.

=== Poland ===
The main parties with Eurosceptic views are Law and Justice (PiS), United Poland (SP) and the Confederation Liberty and Independence and the main Eurosceptic politicians include Ryszard Bender, Andrzej Grzesik, Krzysztof Bosak, Dariusz Grabowski, Janusz Korwin-Mikke, Marian Kowalski, Paweł Kukiz, Zbigniew Ziobro, Anna Sobecka, Robert Winnicki, Artur Zawisza, and Stanisław Żółtek.

Former president of Poland Lech Kaczyński resisted giving his signature on behalf of Poland to the Treaty of Lisbon, objecting specifically to the Charter of Fundamental Rights of the European Union. Subsequently, Poland got an opt-out from this charter. As Polish President, Kaczyński also opposed the Polish government's intentions to join the euro.

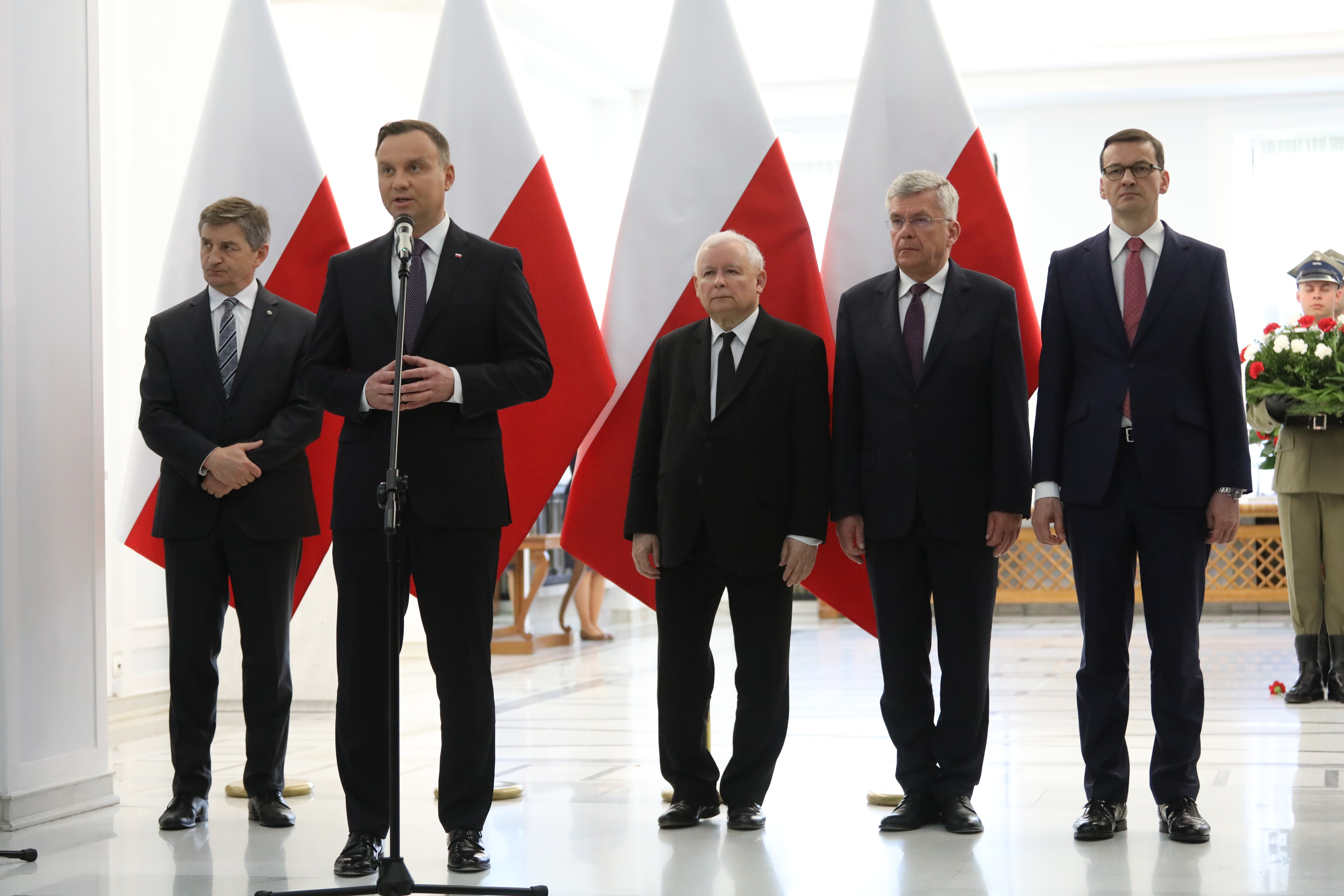
Polish President Andrzej Duda, Polish Prime Minister Mateusz Morawiecki and Jarosław Kaczyński, 9 April 2018

In 2015, it was reported that Euroscepticism was growing in Poland, which was thought to be due to the "economic crisis, concern over perceived interference from Brussels and migration". Polish president Andrzej Duda indicated that he wished for Poland to step back from further EU integration. He suggested that the country should "hold a referendum on joining the euro, resist further integration and fight the EU's green policies", despite getting the largest share of EU cash.

In the 2019 European Parliament election, the Law and Justice party won the largest number of seats, with a vote share increase up from 31.8% to 45.4%, increasing its seats from 19 to 27.

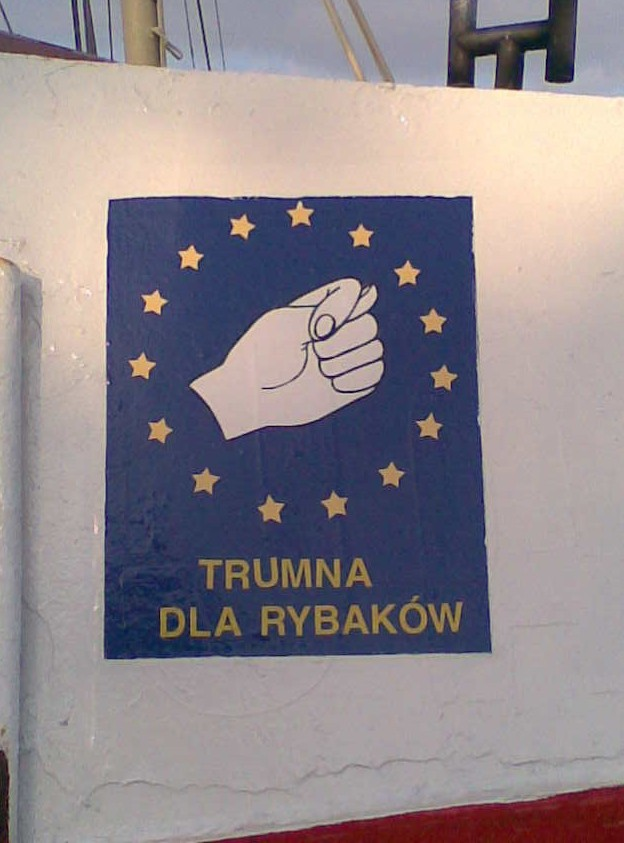
"Trumna dla rybaków" ("Coffin for fishermen"). A sign visible on the sides of many Polish fishing boats. It depicts an obscene Slavic gesture. Polish fishermen protest against the EU's prohibition of cod fishing on Polish ships.

In 2019, the former MEP Stanisław Żółtek created a political party called PolEXIT, whose flagship ideology is Euroscepticism. Its candidate for president of Poland in the 2020 elections was the party's leader, Żółtek, who got 45 419 votes (0.23%), ranking 7th out of 11 candidates and did not qualify to the second round.

=== Portugal ===
The main Eurosceptic parties in Portugal are Chega, the Portuguese Communist Party (PCP), and Left Bloc (BE). Opinion polling in Portugal in 2015 indicated that 48 per cent tended not to trust the EU, while 79 per cent tended not to trust the Portuguese government (then led by Portugal Ahead). Eurosceptic political parties hold a combined total of 64 seats out of 230 in Portugal's parliament (BE 1, PCP 3, CHEGA 60) and a combined total of 4 out of Portugal's 21 seats in the European Parliament (PCP 1, BE 1, CHEGA 2).

In the last 2014 European Parliament election, the Portuguese Communist Party won three seats and the Left Bloc won one seat.

In the 2019 European Parliament election, Left Bloc took 9.8% and gained 1 seat, Portuguese Communist Party working in coalition with Ecologist Party "The Greens" took 6.9% and 2 seats and National Renovator Party (PNR) polled just 0.5%, with no seats.

2019 saw the emergence of a new Eurosceptic political party, Chega, who gained a seat in that year's legislative election. The party did not capture any seats in the 2019 European Parliament elections, but saw its leader André Ventura finish third in the 2021 presidential election, securing 11.9% of those voting.

In the 2022 Portuguese snap election, Chega got 7.2% of the vote and 12 out of the 230 seats in the Assembly of the Republic.

In the 2025 Portuguese snap election, Chega became the second biggest party in Portugal’s parliament, achieving 22.8% of the vote and 60 out of the 230 seats in the Assembly of the Republic.

=== Romania ===
Several parties espousing Eurosceptic views exist on the right, such as the New Republic, the Greater Romania Party and Noua Dreaptă, but as of June 2020 none of these parties are represented in European Parliament. Euroscepticism is relatively unpopular in Romania, a 2015 survey found 65% of Romanians had a positive view of the country's EU membership.

The Eurosceptic parties remained unrepresented in the 2019 European Parliament election.

The soft Eurosceptic Alliance for the Union of Romanians, which was founded in September 2019, entered the Romanian parliament in 2020.

=== Slovakia ===
Parties with Eurosceptic views are the Slovak National Party, Republic, We Are Family, People's Party Our Slovakia. Prominent Slovak Eurosceptic politicians include Andrej Danko, Milan Uhrík, Boris Kollár, Marian Kotleba.

In the 2024 European Parliament election, Republic came 3rd securing 12.5% and winning their first 2 seats in the European Parliament.

=== Slovenia ===
Parties with mainly Eurosceptic views are Slovenian National Party and The Left. Neither won seats in the 2019 European Parliament election in Slovenia.

=== Spain ===
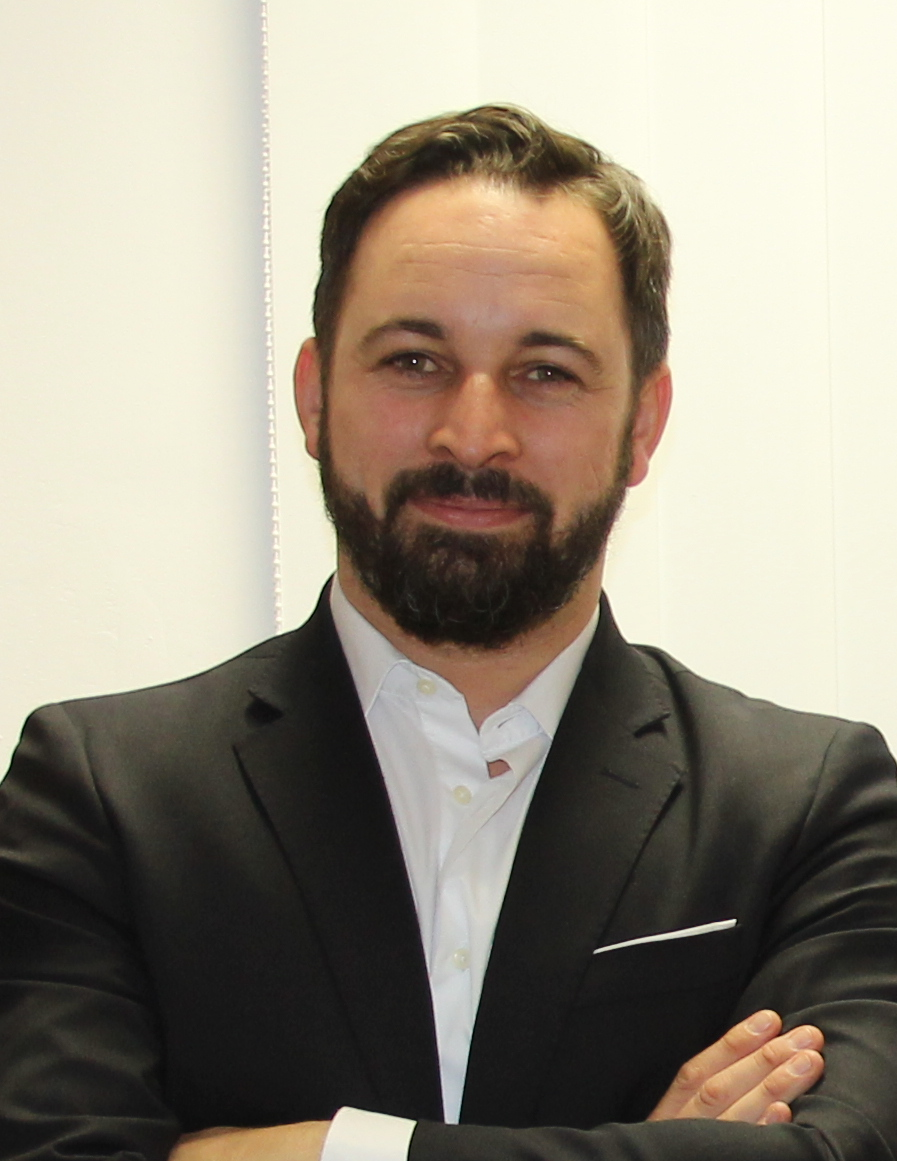
Santiago Abascal, leader of Vox

The process of Europeanization changed during the years in Spain. In 1986 Spain entered in the European Community. Since then, Spain has been one of the most Europeanist countries. Therefore, when Spain became part of the European Community, the country had a strong pro-Europeanist feeling, according to Eurobarometer, as it reflected a 60% of the population. In Spain different reasons explain its entrance to the European Community. On the one hand, democracy has just been established in Spain after Francisco Franco dictatorship. On the other hand, the main objectives of Spain were to achieve economic development, and also a social modernization. Spain was one of the few countries to vote Yes for the European Constitution in a referendum in February 2005, though by a lower margin in Catalonia and the Basque Country.

In 2008, after the financial crisis reached Spain, the percentage of pro European persons started to fall. Thus, during the five years of the economic crisis, the Eurobarometer shows how the trust in the EU increasingly fell in Spain, and the confidence of the Spanish citizens in the European Union decreased for more than 50 points. Spain became one of the most Eurosceptic countries among all European Union Members, as it happened in pretty much European countries, where nationalist and eurosceptic characterised parties became stronger.

The historical two-parties system, composed by the conservative Partido Popular and the social-democratic Partido Socialista Obrero Español, collapsed. In the 2000s, the liberal Ciudadanos and leftist party Podemos became part of the political context, gaining electoral consensus, followed years later by ultranationalist party Vox. The new parties were the effect of the disaffection of most Spaniards towards politics and politicians, that increased for several reasons: firstly, corruption at all political levels, reaching the Royal Family too; secondly, recession intensified distrust of the population towards national government; thirdly, a phase of renovation of the autonomous regions which extended the distance between the National government and the Regional ones.

Candidatura d'Unitat Popular, a left-wing to far-left political party with about 1,300 members advocates independence for Catalonia outside of the European Union. Up to 2014 European elections, there were no Spanish parties present in the Eurosceptic groups at the European Parliament. In the 2015 Spanish general election, Podemos became the first left-wing Eurosceptic political party to win seats in the Congress of Deputies, obtaining 69 seats, and in the 2019 Spanish general election, Vox became the first far-right Eurosceptic political party to win seats in the Congress of Deputies, obtaining 24 seats.

=== Sweden ===
At least until the mid-1980s, the Swedish Social Democrats were largely hostile to the European integration. In the mid-1970s, the Swedish Prime Minister Olof Palme opposed the European integration, criticizing the European communities for being based on four "Cs": He called them "conservative" and "capitalist", seeing it as bad for the labor, "clerical" for being dominated by the Christian democrats, and "colonialist" for helping to "restore French and Belgian control in Africa".

The Left Party of Sweden is against accession to the eurozone and previously wanted Sweden to leave the European Union until 2019. The new party program, adapted in 2024, is highly EU-critical but states that an EU-withdrawal is only a "last option". Their youth organization Young Left is still campaigning for Sweden to leave the EU.

The nationalist and right-wing populist party Sweden Democrats (SD) supports closer political, economic and military cooperation with neighbouring Nordic and certain Northern European countries, but strongly oppose further EU integration and further transfers of Swedish sovereignty to the EU as a whole. The party is also against Swedish accession to the eurozone, the creation of a combined EU military budget and want to renegotiate Swedish membership of the Schengen Agreement. The SD also want a constitutional amendment to require that all EU treaties must be voted on by the Swedish public first and that if the EU cannot be reformed and assumes more power at the expense of national sovereignty Sweden must exit the bloc.

The June List, a Eurosceptic list consisting of members from both the political right and left won three seats in the 2004 Elections to the European Parliament and sat in the EU-critical IND/DEM group in the European Parliament. The movement Folkrörelsen Nej till EU favours a withdrawal from the EU.

Around 75% of the Riksdag members represent parties that officially supports the Sweden membership.

In the European Parliament election, 2014, the Sweden Democrats gained 2 seats with 9.7% of the vote, up 6.4%, and the Left Party took one seat with 6.3% of the vote.

In the European Parliament election, 2019, the Sweden Democrats increased from 2 to 3 seats with 15.3% of the vote, up from 9.7%, and the Left Party retained its one seat with 6.8% of the vote.

In winter 2019–2020, in connection with the request from "poor" member countries of much higher membership fees for "rich" member countries, for the reason of keeping support levels so "poor" countries would not suffer from Brexit, where a "rich" country left the union in part due to high membership fees, a media and social media debate for a "Swexit" increased. This was still rejected by parties representing a majority of the parliament, with the COVID-19 pandemic quickly taking over the debate.

== In non-EU member states ==
=== Armenia ===
Prosperous Armenia represents the main Eurosceptic party in Armenia. Following the 2018 Armenian parliamentary election, the party gained 26 seats in the National Assembly, becoming the official opposition. Following the 2021 Armenian parliamentary election, the party lost all political representation and currently acts as an extra-parliamentary force. The party was a member of the Alliance of Conservatives and Reformists in Europe.

=== Bosnia and Herzegovina ===
Despite an uncritical attitude towards the EU informed by a strong Europeanizing ideology as the consequence of a lack of coherent policy agendas from local political actors, Euroscepticism exists in Bosnia and Herzegovina. An example is the Alliance of Independent Social Democrats is a Bosnian Serb political party in Bosnia and Herzegovina. Founded in 1996, it is the governing party in Bosnia and Herzegovina's entity called Republika Srpska, with its leader being Milorad Dodik.

=== Georgia ===
Georgian March is the main Eurosceptic party in Georgia. The party supports a slight distancing of Georgia from the West, as well as rejecting the country's entrance into NATO.

In March 2022, Georgia submitted a formal application for membership of the EU.

=== Iceland ===
Iceland has rejected EU membership in a 2026 Icelandic European Union membership negotiations referendum. The outcome was reported as an unwelcome one for Brussels, where EU officials had regarded Iceland as a comparatively straightforward candidate whose accession might have reduced scepticism about further enlargement of the European Union and strengthened the bloc's position at a time of increased attention to Arctic security. Iceland would have been the first net contributor to the EU budget to accede since Austria, Finland and Sweden in 1995.

The three main Eurosceptic parties in Iceland are the Independence Party, Left-Green Movement and the Progressive Party. The Independence Party and the Progressive Party won the parliamentary election in April 2013 and they have halted the current negotiations with the European Union regarding Icelandic membership and tabled a parliamentary resolution on 21 February 2014 to withdraw the application completely.

In 2017, Iceland's newly elected government announced that it would hold a vote in parliament on whether to hold a referendum on resuming EU membership negotiations. In November 2017 that government was replaced by a coalition of the Independence Party, the Left Green Movement and the Progressive Party; all of whom oppose membership. Only 11 out of 63 MPs are in favour of EU membership.

=== Moldova ===
The main Eurosceptic parties in Moldova are the left-wing Party of Socialists of the Republic of Moldova, which officially declared its main purpose to be the integration of Moldova in the Eurasian Economic Union, Our Party, and the Party of Communists of the Republic of Moldova. As of October 2025 all the parties are represented in Moldovan Parliament, with 32 MPs out of a total of 101 MPs.

In March 2022, Moldova submitted a formal application for membership of the EU.

=== Montenegro ===
The right-wing Democratic Front alliance are the main moderate eurosceptic subject in the Parliament of Montenegro, although its initially declaratively supported country's bid for accession to the European Union, all other parliamentary subjects officially advocates Montenegrin access to EU. The only parties that advocates Montenegro's rejecting the European integration are the extra-parliamentary right-wing populist to far-right parties, such as True Montenegro, Party of Serb Radicals, Democratic Party of Unity and the Serb List, all four are known for their close cooperation with the parliamentary Democratic Front.

=== Norway ===
Norway has rejected EU membership in two referendums, 1972 and 1994. The Centre Party, Christian Democratic Party, Socialist Left Party and Liberal Party were against EU membership in both referendums. The Liberal Party was particularly divided on the issue, and a large pro-EEC minority split off from the party before the 1972 referendum. In 2020, the Liberal Party officially reversed its position and since then, supports Norwegian EU membership.

Among the established political parties of Norway, the Centre Party, Socialist Left Party, and Red Party are also against Norway's current membership of the European Economic Area. In addition, the libertarian Capitalist Party and Christian-conservative The Christians, both of whom have never held a seat in the Norwegian parliament, are also against Norway's membership in the EEA.

=== Russia ===
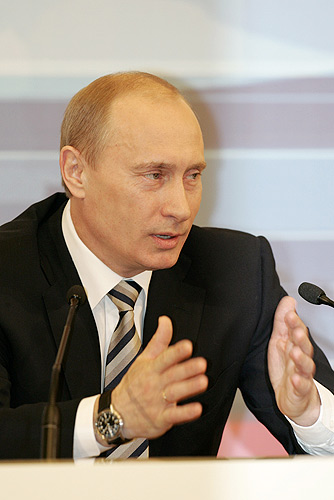
Russian President Vladimir Putin is an outspoken Eurosceptic who has promoted an alternative Economic Union with Armenia, Belarus, Kazakhstan, and Kyrgyzstan – the Eurasian Economic Union.

Parties with mainly Eurosceptic views are the ruling United Russia, and opposition parties the Communist Party of the Russian Federation and Liberal Democratic Party of Russia.

Following the annexation of Crimea, the European Union issued sanctions on the Russian Federation in response to what it regards as an "illegal" annexation and "deliberate destabilisation" of a neighbouring sovereign country. In response to this, Alexey Borodavkin – Russia's permanent representative with the UN – said "The EU is committing a direct violation of human rights by its actions against Russia. The unilateral sanctions introduced against us are not only illegitimate according to international law, they also undermine Russian citizens' freedom of travel, freedom of development, freedom of work and others". In the same year, Russian president Vladimir Putin said: "What are the so-called European values? Maintaining the coup, the armed seizure of power and the suppression of dissent with the help of the armed forces?"

A February 2014 poll conducted by the Levada Center, Russia's largest independent polling organization, found that nearly 80% of Russian respondents had a "good" impression of the EU. This changed dramatically in 2014 with the Russian annexation of Crimea and the war in Donbas, resulting in 70% taking a hostile view of the EU compared to 20% viewing it positively.

A Levada poll released in August 2018 found that 68% of Russians polled believe that Russia needs to dramatically improve relations with Western countries. 42% of Russian respondents said they had a positive view of the EU, up from 28% in May 2018.

=== San Marino ===
A referendum was held in the landlocked microstate on 20 October 2013 in which the citizens were asked whether the country should submit an application to join the European Union. The proposal was rejected because of a low turnout, even though 50.3% of voters approved it. The "Yes" campaign was supported by the main left-wing parties (Socialist Party, United Left) and the Union for the Republic whereas the Sammarinese Christian Democratic Party suggested voting with a blank ballot, the Popular Alliance declared itself neutral, and We Sammarinese and the RETE movement supported the "No" campaign. The Citizens' Rights Directive, which defines the right of free movement for the European citizens, may have been an important reason for those voting no.

=== Serbia ===
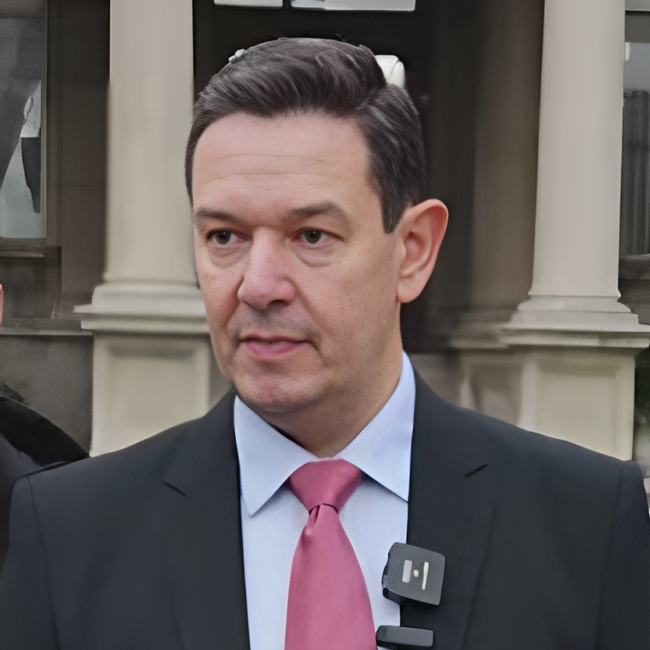
Serbian politician Nemanja Šarović, a prominent Eurosceptic

In Serbia, political parties with eurosceptic views tend to be right-orientated. The most notable examples are the ultranationalist Serbian Radical Party (SRS) which since its inception has opposed entering the European Union and the right-wing populist Dveri. Political parties such as the Democratic Party of Serbia (DSS) had pro-Western views and was initially supportive of the accession into the European Union but under the late 2000s leadership of Vojislav Koštunica they turned eurosceptic, and the Enough is Enough (DJB) political party, initially a liberal centrist party that also supported the accession turned towards the right-wing eurosceptic position shortly after 2018.

Historically, the Socialist Party of Serbia (SPS) and the Yugoslav Left (JUL) were the only two left-leaning political parties that imposed eurosceptic and anti-Western views. The ruling coalition in Serbia, Serbia Must Not Stop, which is predominantly pro-European orientated is also composed of two minor eurosceptic parties, the right-wing Serbian People's Party that advocates closer ties to Russia, and the left-leaning Movement of Socialists which was formed as the eurosceptic split from SPS in the 2000s.

Other minor political parties in Serbia that have eurosceptic views are Healthy Serbia, People's Freedom Movement, Russian Party, Love, Faith, Hope, Serbian Party Oathkeepers, Serbian Right, Leviathan Movement, We – Voice from the People, and We – Power of the People.

=== Switzerland ===
Switzerland has long been known for its neutrality in international politics. Swiss voters rejected EEA membership in 1992, and EU membership in 2001. Despite the passing of several referendums calling for closer relations between Switzerland and the European Union such as the adoption of bilateral treaties and the joining of the Schengen Area, a second referendum of the joining of the EEA or the EU is not expected, and the general public remains opposed to joining.

In February 2014, the Swiss voters narrowly approved a referendum limiting the freedom of movement of EU citizens to Switzerland.

Eurosceptic political parties include the Swiss People's Party, which is the largest political party in Switzerland, with 29.4% of the popular vote as of the 2015 federal election. Smaller Eurosceptic parties include, but are not limited to, the Federal Democratic Union, the Ticino League, and the Geneva Citizens' Movement, all of which are considered right-wing parties.

In addition, the Campaign for an Independent and Neutral Switzerland is a political organisation in Switzerland that is strongly opposed to Swiss membership of or further integration otherwise with the European Union.

Regionally, the German-speaking majority as well as the Italian-speaking areas are the most Eurosceptic, while French-speaking Switzerland tends to be more pro-European integration. In the 2001 referendum, the majority of French-speakers voted against EU membership. According to a 2016 survey conducted by M.I.S Trend and published in L'Hebdo, 69 percent of the Swiss population supports systematic border controls, and 53 percent want restrictions on the EU accord of the free movements of peoples and 14 percent want it completely abolished. 54% of the Swiss population said that if necessary, they would ultimately keep the freedom of movement of people's accord.

=== Turkey ===
The two main Eurosceptic parties are the far-right ultranationalist, Nationalist Movement Party (MHP), which secured 11.1% of votes, and 49 seats in the Parliament at the last election, and the Felicity Party (Saadet Partisi), a far-right Sunni Islamist party, which has no seats in the Parliament, as it only secured 0.7% of the votes in the last election, far below the 10% threshold necessary to be represented in the Parliament.

Many left-wing nationalist and far-left parties hold no seats at parliament but they control many activist and student movements in Turkey. The Patriotic Party (formerly called Workers' Party) consider the European Union as a front-runner of global imperialism.

Founded on 26 August 2021 under the leadership of Ümit Özdağ, Victory Party (Turkey) is a Turkish nationalist and anti-immigrant political party. "The European Union does not want to negotiate with Turkey. We will not humiliate Turkey anymore." Özdağ said.

=== Ukraine ===
Parties with mainly Eurosceptic views are Opposition Platform – For Life, Opposition Bloc, Party of Shariy and Right Sector.

The far-right Ukrainian group Right Sector opposes joining the European Union. It regards the EU as an "oppressor" of European nations.

In the 2019 parliamentary election the Opposition Platform – For Life won 37 seats on the nationwide party list and 6 constituency seats.

The leader of the Party of Shariy Anatoly Shariy is one of the closest associates of Viktor Medvedchuk, whom Ukraine's special services suspect of financing terrorism.

=== United Kingdom ===
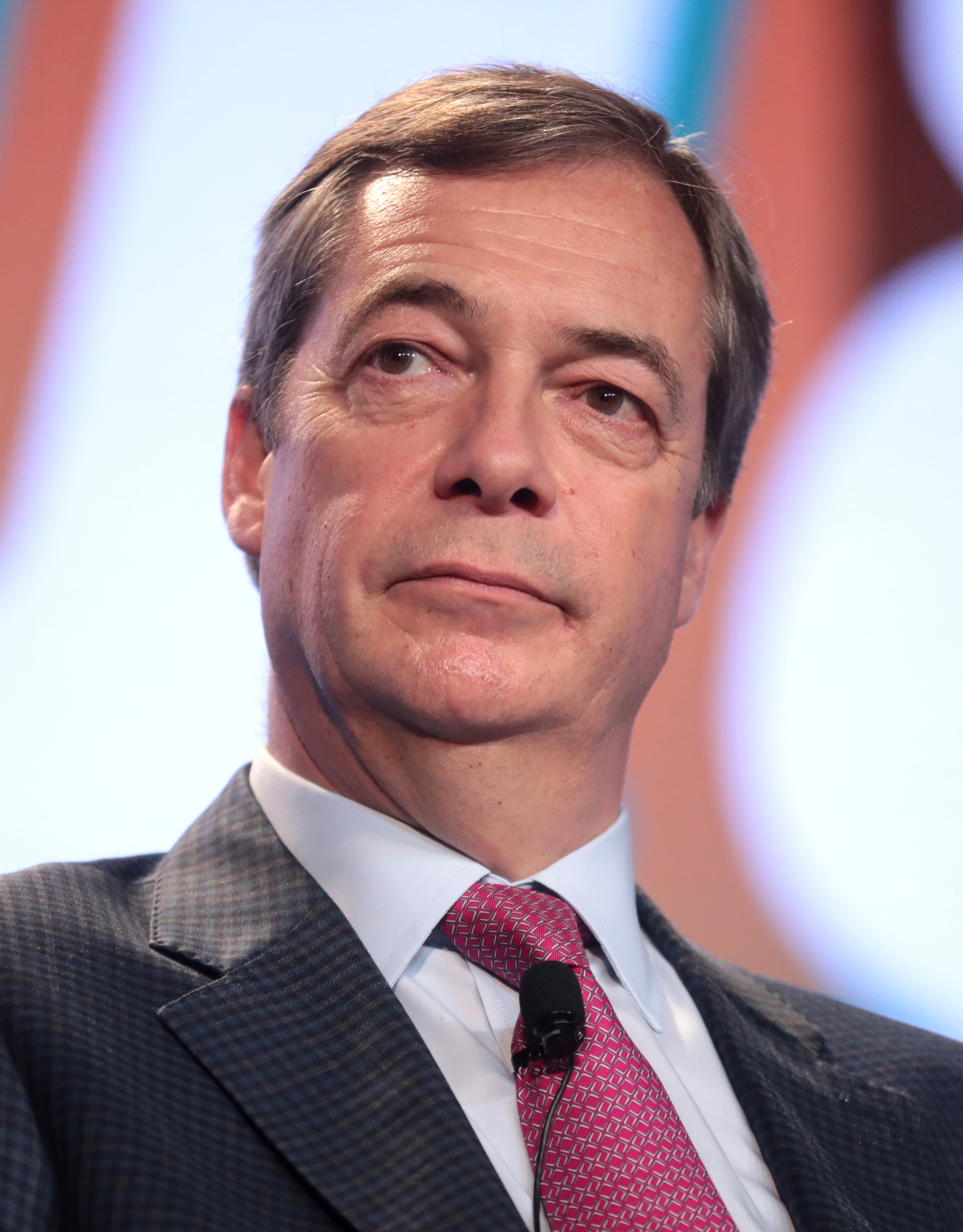
Nigel Farage, former Leader of UKIP and current leader of Reform UK and former co-leader of the Europe of Freedom and Direct Democracy group in the European Parliament. Farage is one of the most prominent Eurosceptic figures in the UK.

The European Union, and Britain's place in relation to it, is one of the primary issues today dividing opinion among the British public, political parties, media and civil society.

Euroscepticism has been an element in British politics ever since the inception of the European Economic Community (EEC), the predecessor to the EU, and its salience as an issue has fluctuated widely over the years. The European Communities membership referendum of 1975 took place in the context of Conservative and Liberal parties which were generally in favour of membership (in the 1971 House of Commons vote on whether the UK should join the European Economic Community, only 39 of the then 330 Conservative MPs had been opposed to membership), and a Labour party which was sharply divided. After the referendum, which gave a strong assent to continued membership, Euroscepticism was a strand of opinion characteristic of the Labour party; at the 1983 general election, for example, Labour campaigned on a promise to withdraw from the EEC. This opposition to membership faded quickly after the election of Neil Kinnock as leader of the party, and Euroscepticism gradually came to be less popular on the left of politics than on the right - though left-wing opposition to membership continues to this day. Current and recent supporters on the left of British politics include Frank Field, Graham Stringer, Ian Austin, John Mann, Tom Harris, Gisela Stuart, Austin Mitchell, Kate Hoey and George Galloway.

When Margaret Thatcher came into power as the Prime Minister in 1979, she was as strongly in favour of membership as most Conservative MPs, having campaigned for "yes" in the 1975 referendum. By the time she left office, however, she had developed what at the time was a strongly Eurosceptic stance; she has been called the "spiritual mother" of Euroscepticism. She never argued for leaving while Prime Minister, envisioning continued membership of a less integrationist EEC, and became one of the most significant Eurosceptic voices in the United Kingdom in the 1990s, influencing the Conservatives’ view on the EU. In 2009 the Conservative Party actively campaigned against the Lisbon Treaty, which it believed would give away too much sovereignty to Brussels. Shadow Foreign Secretary William Hague stated that, should the treaty be in force by the time of an incoming Conservative government, he would "not let matters rest there".

The right-wing UK Independence Party (UKIP) was set up for the specific purpose of advocating for the UK unilaterally leaving the European Union (Brexit) from its foundation in 1993. This party initially had very little support from the UK population as a whole. It was initially eclipsed by the Referendum Party, which fought the 1997 general election on the single issue of a referendum to leave the EU. The party's main success was found in elections to the European Parliament, where they experienced a continuous rise in their support from 1999, when they came fourth and won their first seats. In 2004 they came third, becoming the first "small" party to overtake the Liberals in a national vote since Labour in the 1920s. In 2009 UKIP came second, and then, in 2014, they topped the poll, pushing the Conservatives into third for the first time in their history. UKIP also had some strong support locally in solidly working class areas, with 163 councillors elected to local authorities and gaining overall control in 2015 of Thanet District Council.

However, UKIP — like most small parties in the UK — found it almost impossible to break into Westminster politics, only ever achieving one elected MP, in 2015. Accordingly, after the inconclusive general election result of 2010, resulting in a hung Parliament, the issue of EU membership remained low on the political priority agenda at Westminster — broadly speaking a non-issue. This changed with UKIP's victory in the 2014 European Parliament election, in the wake of which two Conservative MPs defected to UKIP. The party with the largest number of seats in the 2010 Parliament was the Conservatives, which was firstly deeply divided on the issue, being led by a pro-European leadership on the whole, but with a large number of very vociferous Eurosceptic backbenchers, and secondly concerned at UKIP's possible electoral threat to the party at the following election. The Conservative leader David Cameron promised a referendum on EU membership in the party's 2015 general election manifesto.

By 2015, support for the Liberal Democrats had shrunk considerably, a phenomenon widely attributed to a policy U-turn on university tuition fees. In the election, the Lib Dem vote collapsed, leading to an outright Conservative victory, to the surprise of many, as national polling had consistently predicted another hung Parliament. This majority meant that David Cameron's pledge now had to be fulfilled. In an effort to reduce Euroscepticism, Cameron sought and gained from the EU a renegotiation of some of the terms of Britain's EU membership, to a mixed response from the media and his party.

For the 23 June 2016 referendum on the EU membership, whilst the Conservatives had no official political policy position either way, its leader Cameron was avowedly in favour of remaining in the EU — though with the renegotiation of the terms of membership little political mileage was gained — and the party remained profoundly split, as it had been for many years.

Labour Party policy officially supported remaining in the EU, although with long-standing Eurosceptic Jeremy Corbyn party leader, he and his Momentum supporters gave a lacklustre defence against leaving. Since first being elected in 1984 as a stalwart adherent of Eurosceptic Tony Benn on the left wing of the party, Corbyn had personally advocated withdrawal throughout his terms as a Labour MP, so he suggested early on in the campaign that he would willingly consider withdrawal contrary to official party policy. The Liberal Democrats were the most adamantly pro-EU of the main parties, and since the referendum, pro-Europeanism has been their main policy.

The referendum resulted in an overall vote to leave the EU, as opposed to remaining an EU member, by 52% to 48%, on a turnout of 72%. The vote was split between the constituent countries of the United Kingdom, with a majority in England and Wales voting to leave, and a majority in Scotland and Northern Ireland, as well as an overwhelming 96% in Gibraltar, a British Overseas Territory, voting to remain. As a result of the referendum, the UK Government notified the EU of its intention to withdraw on 29 March 2017 by invoking Article 50 of the Lisbon Treaty.

On 12 April 2019, a new Eurosceptic party, the Brexit Party, was officially launched by the former UKIP leader Nigel Farage, to use the 2019 European Parliament election to put pressure on a Conservative government perceived to be failing to pursue Brexit with adequate enthusiasm or success. In the event, although overall pro-EU parties score a similar share of the vote to Eurosceptic parties, the Brexit Party topped the national poll by a large margin, with 32% of the vote. The Conservatives, on the other hand, suffered their lowest ever national vote share at 9%, with just 4 seats. This historic electoral defeat – along with an inability to navigate an agreeable route between a "soft" or "hard" Brexit in Parliament – led to Theresa May announcing the day after the election that she would step down as the Conservatives' leader and Prime Minister on 7 June. After the elections, the Eurosceptic Blue Collar Conservative grouping of Conservative MPs was formed.

The Conservatives' resounding defeat led them to elect a new leader who might gain votes back from the Brexit Party, by pursuing a "harder" Brexit more determinedly than Theresa May had done. Following the election of Boris Johnson as leader in July, the Conservatives' new Cabinet became strongly supportive of the withdrawal of the United Kingdom from the European Union. Its platform was changed to unequivocally support EU withdrawal, and there was a systematic campaign in preparation for the 2019 general election to enforce loyalty to this aim by deselecting all MPs and candidates from the party who refused to explicitly undertake to support it. The Conservatives fought the election on the slogan "Get Brexit Done", a slogan which attracted strong criticism from almost all the other parties in Parliament. The election resulted in the largest overall majority for the Conservatives since the 1980s, the highest percentage of the popular vote for any party since 1979, and significant losses for the opposition Labour and Liberal Democrats.

A month later, on 23 January 2020, Parliament ratified a withdrawal agreement from the European Union, which was in turn ratified by the EU Parliament on 30 January. On 31 January, the United Kingdom officially left the European Union after 47 years. During a transition period until 31 December 2020, the UK still followed EU rules and continued free trade and free movement for people within the European Union.

== Counter-criticism ==
Ben Chu, writing for The Independent, argued against the left-wing notion that the EU is a neoliberal organization, pointing to "high levels of social protection, state-owned rail companies, nationalised utilities and banks, various price controls and industrial interventions". Unlike other left-wing critiques of the European Union—which are more focused on failure to achieve a social Europe—Hans Kundnani's book Eurowhiteness takes aim at the goals of European integration itself, as Kundani argues that the European Union reproduces the same failings of nationalism on a larger scale.

== See also ==
- Anti-globalization – Worldwide political movement against multinational corporations
- Balkanization – Fragmentation of a country or region
- Euromyth – Exaggerated or invented story about the European Union
- European Referendum Campaign – Campaign for referendums on European treaties
- Europeanism – Norms and values that Europeans have in common
- Eurosclerosis – Term to describe a pattern of economic stagnation in Europe
- Federal Europe – Speculative future European federation
- Institutions of the European Union – Decision-making bodies of the European Union
- Migration and asylum policy of the European Union
- Populism in Europe
- Radical right in Europe – Right-wing groups in Europe since 1970
- Subsidiarity in the European Union – Principle of governance of the European Union (The rights and responsibilities of member states.)
  - States Rights – Political powers reserved for U.S. states rather than the federal government
- Withdrawal from the European Union under Article 50 – Legal process of Article 50 of the Treaty of European Union
- Withdrawal from the eurozone – Member state ceases use of the euro as its currency
