= Eurowhiteness =

2023 non-fiction book by Hans Kundnani

- 2023 cover
- Author: Hans Kundnani
- Publisher: Hurst Publishers
- ISBN: 978-1787389328
- Website: https://www.hurstpublishers.com/book/eurowhiteness/

Eurowhiteness: Culture, Empire and Race in the European Project is a 2023 non-fiction book by Hans Kundnani. In the book, Kundnani questions the perception that the European Union is cosmopolitan in nature; instead, he argues that the ethnic and cultural elements of nationalism are also present in the European project.

== Background ==
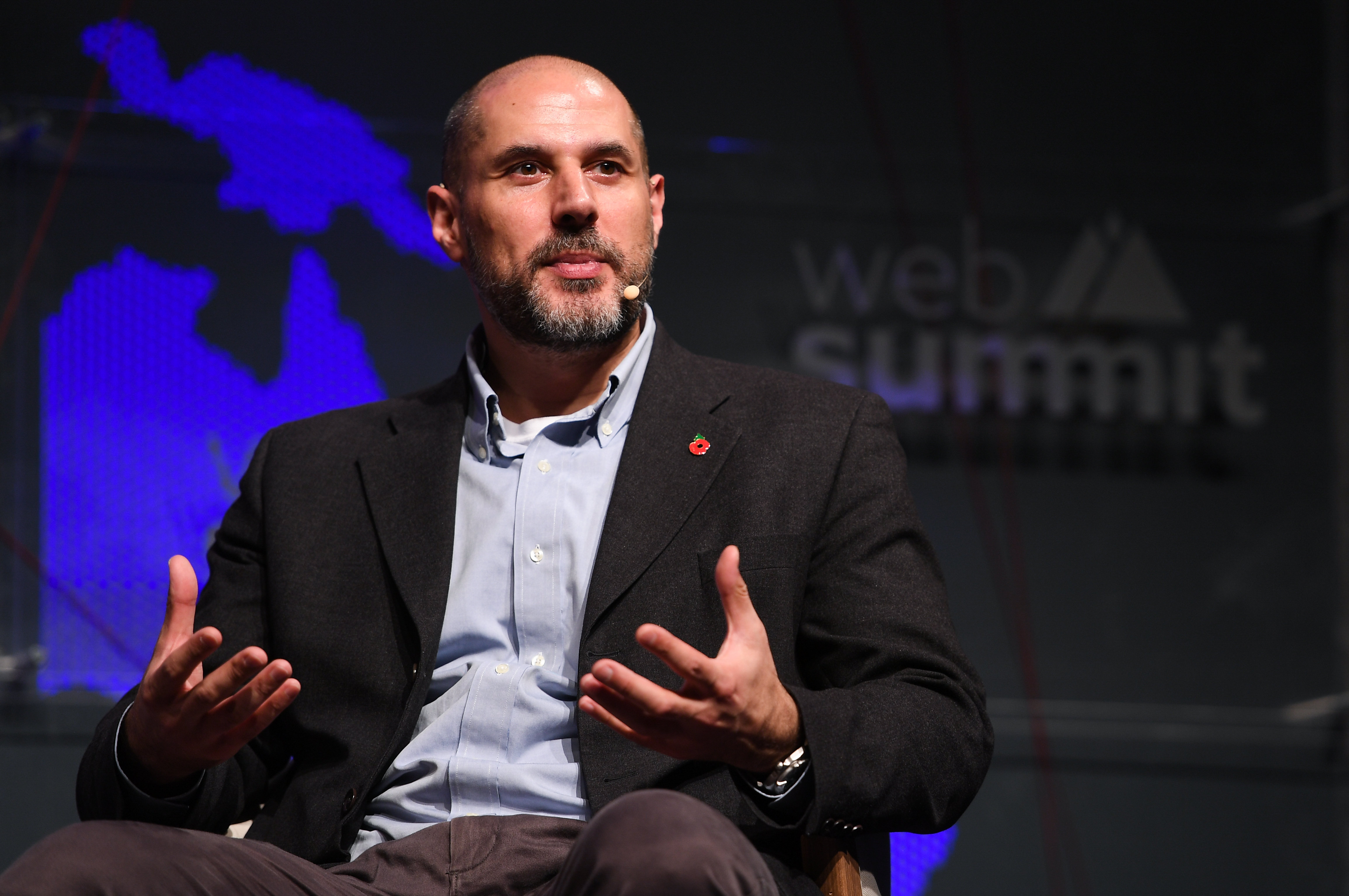
Kundnani speaks at Web Summit 2019

Hans Kundnani is a British scholar of Indian and Dutch descent. He said that the book was inspired by his family background and by the 2014 book Eurafrica about the European Union's relations with African countries. Kundnani also quotes a similar argument made by Hannah Arendt in 1948: European federation would "make it only too easy to apply their former nationalism to a larger structure and become as narrowly and chauvinistically European as they were formerly German, Italian, or French". The term "Eurowhiteness" was originally coined by Hungarian sociologist József Böröcz, though Kundnani applies the word differently.

== Content ==
In the book, Kundnani defines "Eurowhiteness" as "the ethnic-cultural idea of European identity, centered on the EU". He questions whether the European Union is cosmopolitan in nature. In contrast, he argues that Europeanism, rather like nationalism, is composed of ethnic, cultural, and civic elements in tension with each other—and that the ethnic and cultural dimensions have grown more salient in the years before he published the book. He also cites evidence that Brexit was supported by many non-white Britons, arguing that it could be a step towards making the United Kingdom less Eurocentric. Unlike other left-wing critiques of the European Union—which are more focused on failure to achieve a social Europe—Kundnani's book takes aim at the goals of European integration itself.

== Reception ==
Sarah Ganty and Dimitry Vladimirovich Kochenov write that "'Eurowhiteness' is the best available diagnosis of Europe's self-appointed cosmopolitanism". Henning Melber agrees with Kundnani's argument that European perceptions of having learned lessons from the Holocaust have blocked a reckoning with Europe's colonial past.

In The New Statesman, Marina Wheeler writes that the book "offers plenty to trouble the liberal conscience". For example, Kundnani argues that while many pro-Europeans believe that the EU "stands for diversity, inclusion and openness", the removal of internal barriers has only strengthened external ones. A review in Jacobin was titled: "European identity isn't an antidote to nationalism". Merijn Chamon criticizes Kundnani for "a one-sided and negative narrative of the EU", but concurs with another reviewer that the book is "a clear, elegantly written polemic" that is worth reading. Reviewing the "widely debated book", Kiran Klaus Patel praises Kundnani's extensive research, "new analytical framework and fresh empirical interpretations", although he is not entirely convinced by the latter. Stefan Auer writes that Kundnani "masterfully exposed" the European Union's internal contradictions.

The book received a roundtable discussion in the Czech Journal of International Relations and other reviews.
