= Boom operator =

The term boom operator may refer to:

- Boom operator (military), a member of the crew aboard an aerial refueling tanker, responsible for "flying the boom"
- Boom operator (media), a member of the crew of a film or radio project, responsible for operating a microphone and sound boom

== See also ==
- Operator (profession)
