= Metrea =

American military contractor

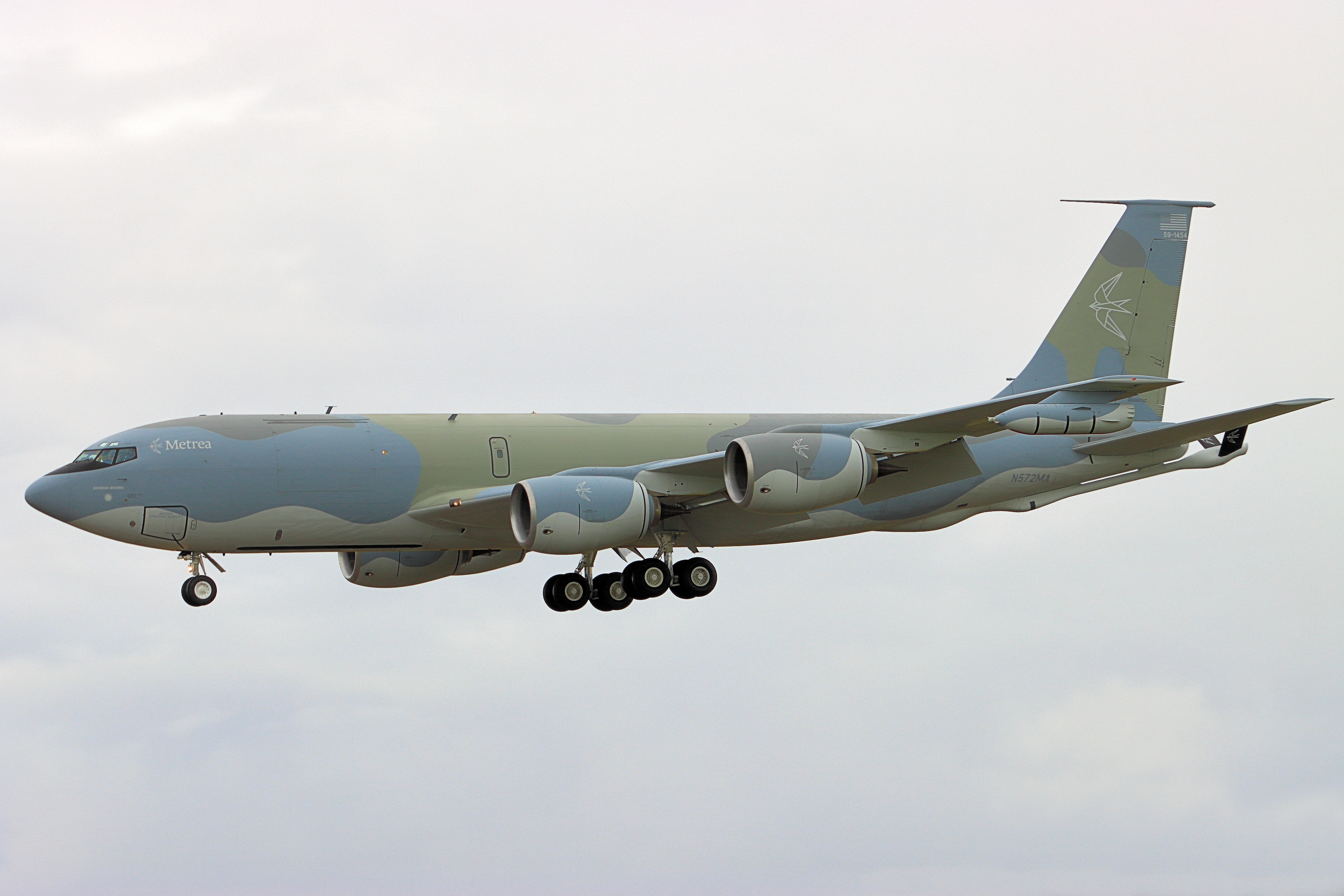
- Type: Private Company
- Industry: Military contractor
- Founded: 2016
- Headquarters: Washington, D.C., United States
- Key people: Jon Davis (President & CEO)
- Website: www.metrea.aero

Metrea (Formerly Meta Aerospace) is a military contractor based in the United States which provides air logistics and surveillance, electronic and cyberwarfare services support to militaries in the US, Canada, NATO and allied countries.

== History ==
Metrea was founded on August 26, 2016.

The head of the Air & Space Group is Jon T. Thomas, former lieutenant general of the United States Air Force.

As of February 2025, it operated 15 Boeing KC-135R Stratotanker.

Four aircraft were purchased from the Republic of Singapore Air Force when the latter retired them in 2019. They were delivered in late 2020. Eleven additional aircraft were purchased from the French Air and Space Force in June 2024, with three more pending delivery.

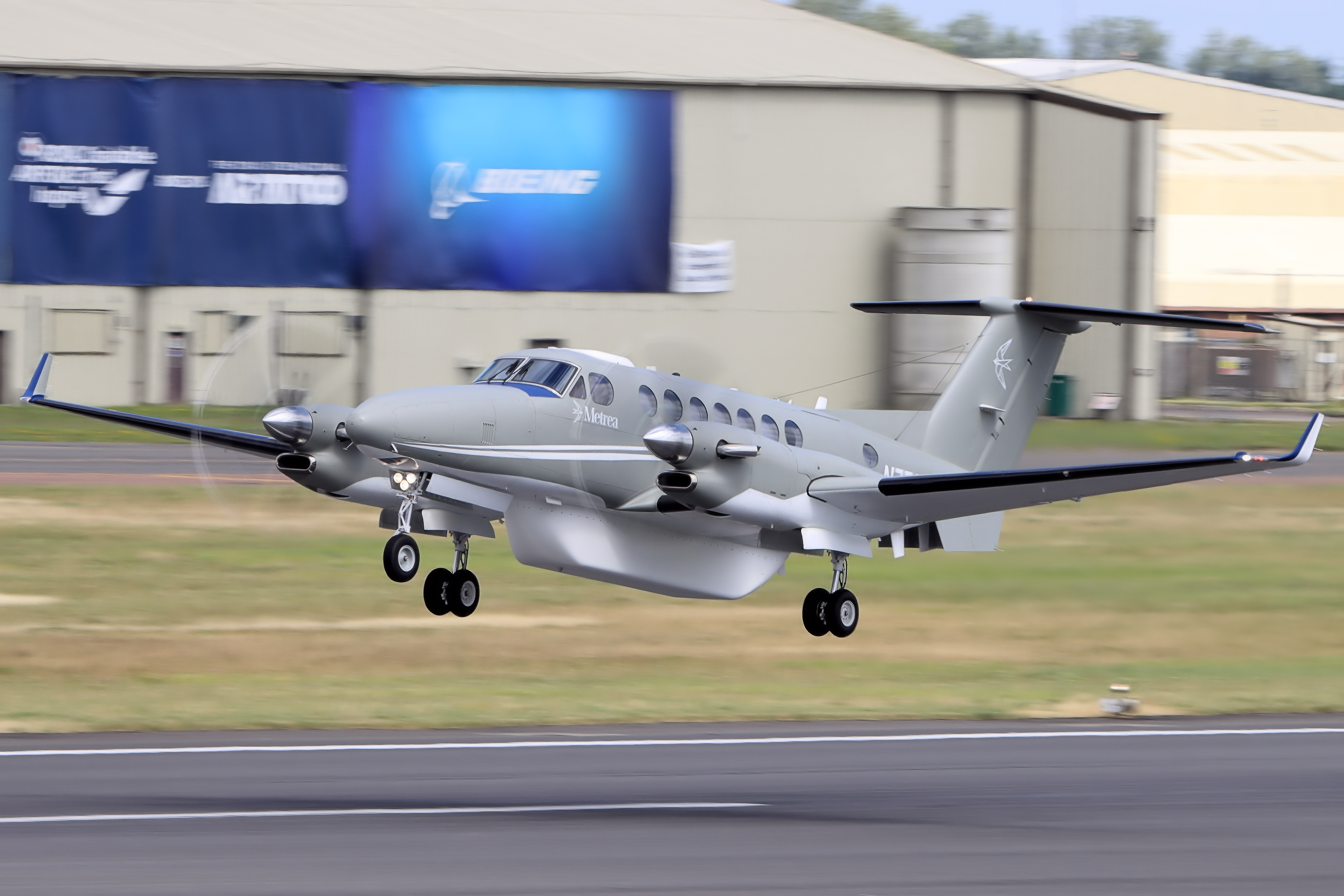
Beechcraft King Air 300 ISR of Metrea, 2024.

On February 6, 2025, a Beechcraft B300 King Air 350 Intelligence, Surveillance and Reconnaissance light aircraft from Metrea crashed in the town of Ampatuan on the island of Mindanao in the Philippines during a routine mission supporting U.S.-Philippine security cooperation activities. The three Metrea employees and one American soldier on board died.

On 28 March 2025, the Indian Ministry of Defence signed a contract with Metrea Management to supply one KC-135R Flight Refueling Aircraft (FRA) to the Indian Air Force (IAF) within six months for training pilots of IAF and the Indian Navy for in-flight refueling. The refueling jet landed at Agra Air Force Station on 21 November. This is a wet lease agreement where the aircraft would be flown, manned and maintained by pilots and crew belonging to the lessor.

In 2026, Bombardier Defense announced they would supply Metrea with three Bombardier Global 6500 aircraft to assist the Australian Border Force.

== See also ==
- Omega Aerial Refueling Services
- MAG Aerospace
