= 57-1419 =

Oldest active US military aircraft

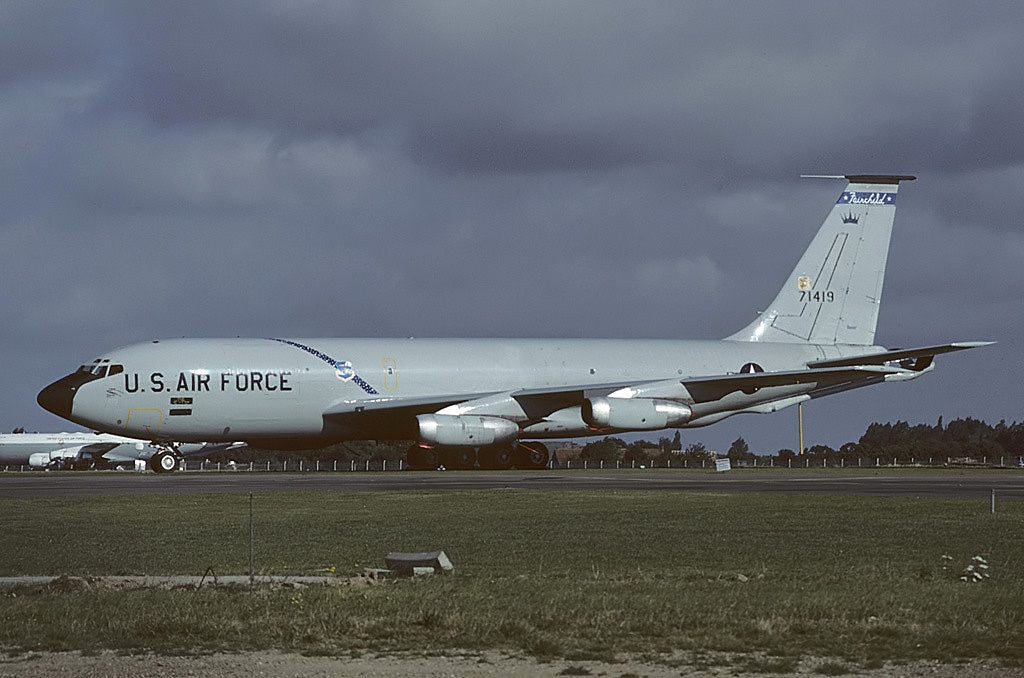
Boeing KC-135A Stratotanker 57-1419 in 1985, prior to conversion to KC-135R standard.

57-1419 is the tail number of an individual Boeing KC-135R Stratotanker. It is the oldest aircraft in active United States military service as of June 2018. As of 2013, 57-1419 had 22,300 flight hours.

57-1419 was built in 1957 as a KC-135A and was assigned to Strategic Air Command (SAC). The aircraft went on to be assigned to SAC Wings in Washington, North Dakota, Kansas, Georgia and Japan. In 1991, while serving with the 92nd Wing at Fairchild Air Force Base, 57-1419 was re-engined with its Pratt & Whitney J57 turbojets being replaced with the more efficient CFM International F108 turbofans, leading to the airframe being redesignated as a KC-135R.

By 2008, 57-1419 was assigned to the 190th Air Refueling Wing of the Kansas Air National Guard. It then transferred to the New Hampshire ANG's 157th Air Refueling Wing, before being assigned to its current unit – the 161st Air Refueling Wing of the Arizona ANG in 2019.
