= Boeing KC-135 Stratotanker =

US military aerial refueling and transport aircraft

KC-135 Stratotanker
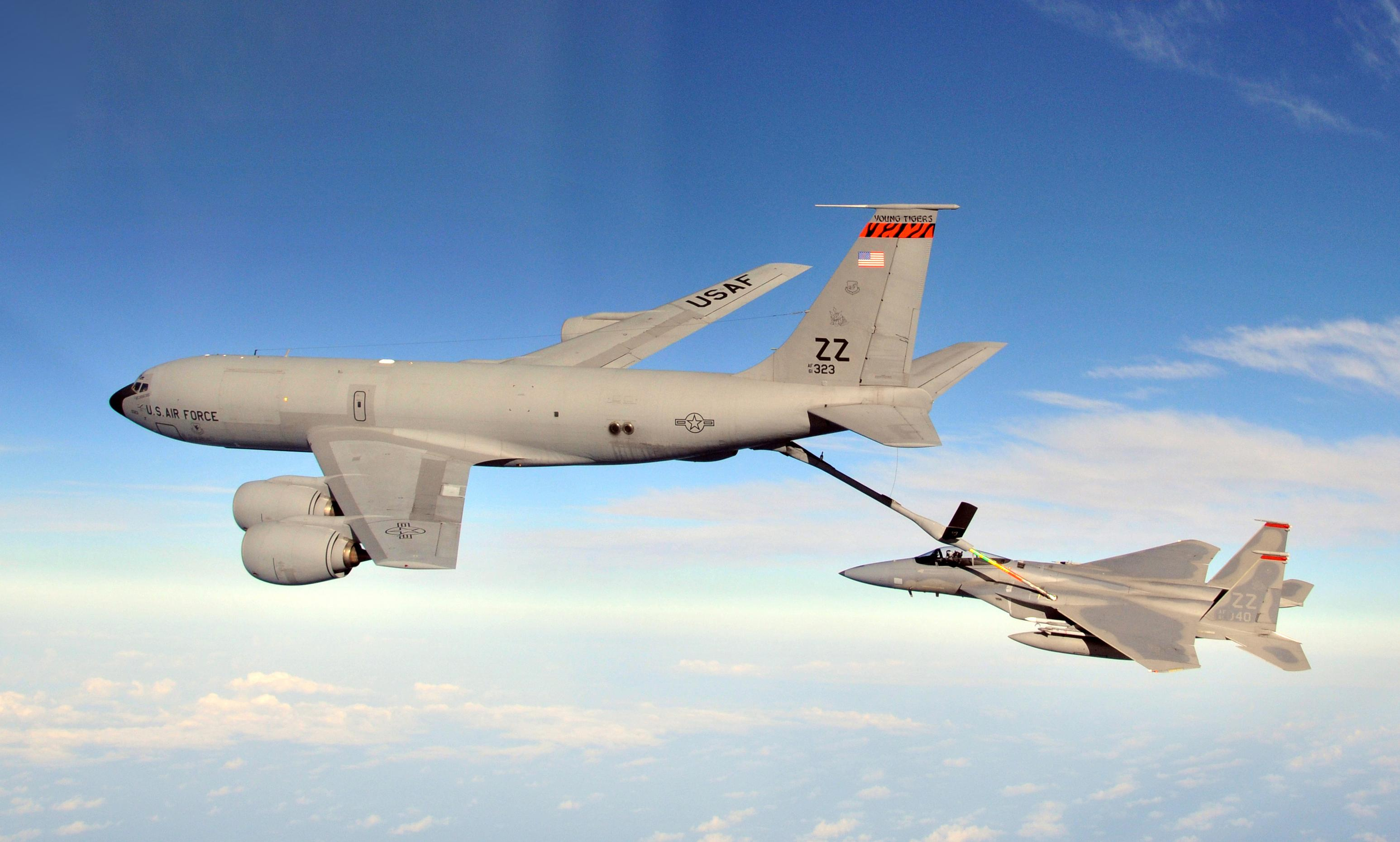
- A KC-135R (above) refuels an F-15C Eagle (below)

General information
- Other name: Model 717
- Type: Aerial refueling tanker and transport aircraft
- National origin: United States
- Manufacturer: Boeing
- Status: In service
- Primary users: United States Air Force Metrea; Turkish Air Force; Republic of Singapore Air Force (historical)
- Number built: 803

History
- Manufactured: 1955–1965
- Introduction date: June 1957
- First flight: 31 August 1956
- Developed from: Boeing 367-80
- Variants: Boeing C-135 Stratolifter; Boeing NC-135

The Boeing KC-135 Stratotanker is an American military aerial refueling tanker aircraft that was developed from the Boeing 367-80 prototype, alongside the Boeing 707 airliner. It has a narrower fuselage and is shorter than the 707. Boeing gave the aircraft the internal designation of Model 717, with the number later assigned to a different Boeing aircraft.

The KC-135 was the United States Air Force's (USAF) first jet-powered refueling tanker; it replaced the KC-97 Stratofreighter. The KC-135 was initially tasked with refueling strategic bombers and was used extensively in the Vietnam War and later conflicts such as Operation Desert Storm and the Iran war to extend the range and endurance of US tactical fighters and bombers.

The KC-135 entered service with the USAF in 1957. It is one of nine military fixed-wing aircraft (six American, three Russian) with over 60 years of continuous service (Note: The nine military fixed-wing aircraft with over 60 years of continuous service are Boeing B-52 Stratofortress bomber (1955), Lockheed C-130 Hercules cargo and troop transporter (1956), Tupolev Tu-95 bomber (1956); Boeing KC-135 "Stratotanker" mid-air refueller (1957); Lockheed U-2 "Dragon Lady" reconnaissance (1957); Ilyushin Il-18 transport (1958), Antonov An-12 transport and patrol (1959), Northrop T-38 Talon jet trainer (1961), and Lockheed P-3 Orion naval and submarine surveillance (1962). Also, one helicopter remains, the Boeing CH-47 Chinook (1962).) with its original operator. The KC-135 was supplemented by the larger McDonnell Douglas KC-10 Extender. Studies have concluded that many of the aircraft could be flown until 2030, although maintenance costs have greatly increased. The KC-135 is to be partially replaced by the Boeing KC-46 Pegasus.

== Development ==
=== Background ===
In 1950, the USAF operated the world's first production aerial tanker, the Boeing KC-97 Stratofreighter, a gasoline-fueled, piston-engined Boeing Stratocruiser (USAF designation C-97 Stratofreighter) with a Boeing-developed flying boom and extra kerosene (jet fuel) tanks feeding the boom. The Stratocruiser airliner was developed from the Boeing B-29 Superfortress bomber after World War II. In the KC-97, the mixed gasoline/kerosene fuel system was not desirable, and a jet-powered tanker aircraft obviously would be the next development, having a single type of fuel for both its own engines and for passing to receiver aircraft. The 230 mph (370 km/h) cruise speed of the slower, piston-engined KC-97 was also a serious issue, as using it as an aerial tanker forced the newer, jet-powered military aircraft to slow down to mate with the tanker's boom.

Like its sibling, the commercial Boeing 707 jet airliner, the KC-135 was derived from the Boeing 367-80 jet transport "proof of concept" demonstrator, which was commonly called the "Dash-80". The KC-135 is similar in appearance to the 707, but has a narrower fuselage and is shorter than the 707. The KC-135 predates the 707 and is structurally quite different from the civilian airliner. Boeing gave the future KC-135 tanker the initial designation Model 717.

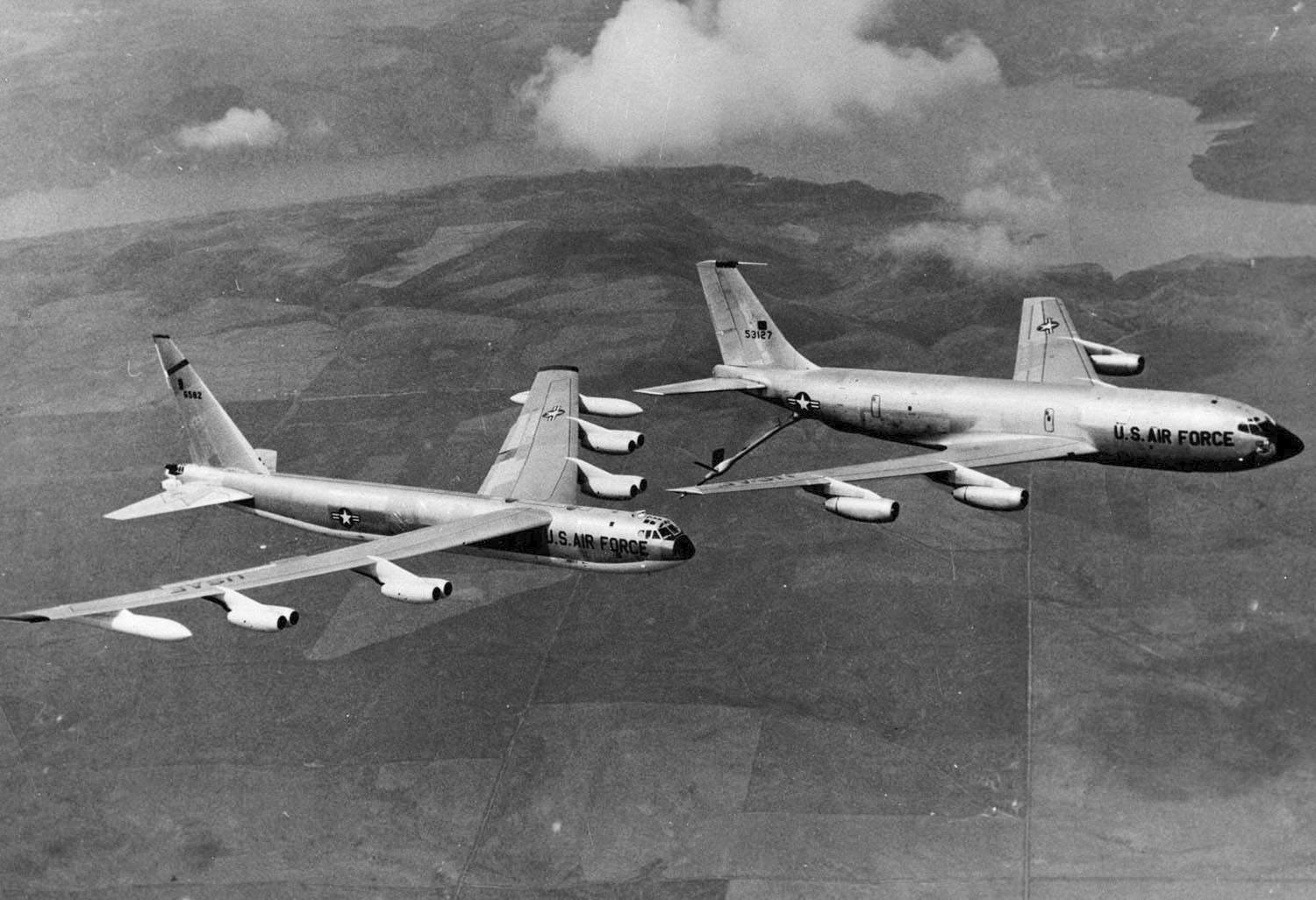
A KC-135A refueling a B-52D during the Cold War: Both aircraft types were operated by the Strategic Air Command.

In 1954, USAF's Strategic Air Command (SAC) held a competition for a jet-powered aerial-refueling tanker. In 1955, Lockheed Corporation's tanker version of the proposed Lockheed L-193 airliner with rear fuselage-mounted engines was declared the winner. Since Boeing's proposal was already flying, the KC-135 could be delivered two years earlier and Air Force Secretary Harold E. Talbott ordered 250 KC-135 tankers until Lockheed's design could be manufactured. In the end, orders for the Lockheed tanker were dropped rather than supporting two tanker designs. Lockheed never produced its jet airliner. Boeing eventually dominated the market with a family of airliners based on the 707.

In 1954, the USAF placed an initial order for 29 KC-135As, the first of an eventual 820 of all variants of the basic C-135 family. The first aircraft flew in August 1956. The initial-production Stratotanker was delivered to Castle Air Force Base, California, in June 1957. The last KC-135 was delivered to the USAF in 1965.

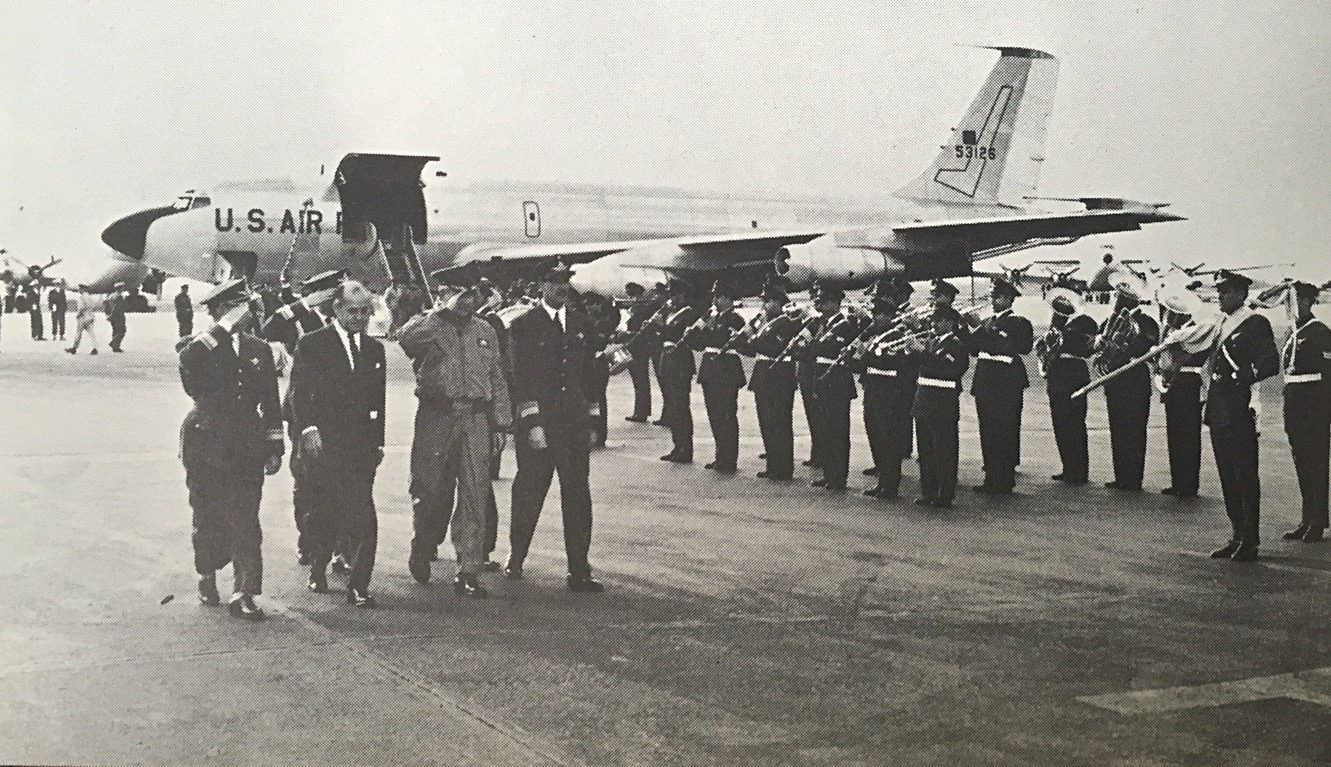
In November 1957, Air Force Vice Chief of Staff General Curtis LeMay tested the first KC-135 on a long-haul flight from Westover Air Force Base, Massachusetts, to Buenos Aires, Argentina.

Developed in the early 1950s, the basic airframe is characterized by 35°, aft-swept wings and tail, four underwing-mounted engine pods, a horizontal stabilizer mounted on the fuselage near the bottom of the vertical stabilizer with positive dihedral on the two horizontal planes, and a high-frequency radio antenna, which protrudes forward from the top of the vertical fin or stabilizer. These basic features make it strongly resemble the commercial Boeing 707 and 720 aircraft, although it is a different aircraft.

Reconnaissance and command post variants of the aircraft, including the RC-135 Rivet Joint and EC-135 Looking Glass aircraft were operated by SAC from 1963 to 1992, when they were reassigned to the Air Combat Command. The USAF EC-135 Looking Glass was subsequently replaced in its role by the U.S. Navy E-6 Mercury aircraft, a newly built airframe based on the Boeing 707-320B.

=== Engine retrofits ===
All KC-135s were originally equipped with Pratt & Whitney J57-P-59W turbojet engines, which produced 10,000 lbf (44 kN) of thrust dry, and about 13,000 lbf (58 kN) of thrust wet. Wet thrust is achieved through the use of water injection on takeoff, as opposed to "wet thrust" when used to describe an afterburning engine. 670 US gallons (2,500 L) of water are injected into the engines over the course of three minutes. The water is injected into the inlet and the diffuser case in front of the combustion case. The water cools the air in the engine to increase its density; it also reduces the turbine gas temperature, which is a primary limitation on many jet engines. This allows the use of more fuel for proper combustion and creates more thrust for short periods of time, similar in concept to "war emergency power" in a piston-engined aircraft.

A nose-on view of several re-engined KC-135R aircraft taxiing prior to takeoff: The new engines are CFM56-2 high-bypass turbofans.

In the 1980s, the first modification program retrofitted 157 Air Force Reserve (AFR) and Air National Guard (ANG) tankers with the Pratt & Whitney TF33-PW-102 turbofan engines, from 707 airliners retired in the late 1970s and early 1980s. The modified tanker, designated the KC-135E, was 14% more fuel-efficient than the KC-135A and could offload 20% more fuel on long-duration flights. Only the KC-135E aircraft were equipped with thrust reversers for aborted takeoffs and shorter landing rollouts.

The KC-135E fleet has since either been retrofitted as the R-model configuration or placed into long-term storage ("XJ"), as Congress has prevented the USAF from formally retiring them. The final KC-135E, tail number 56-3630, was delivered by the 101st Air Refueling Wing to the 309th Aerospace Maintenance and Regeneration Group at Davis–Monthan Air Force Base in September 2009.

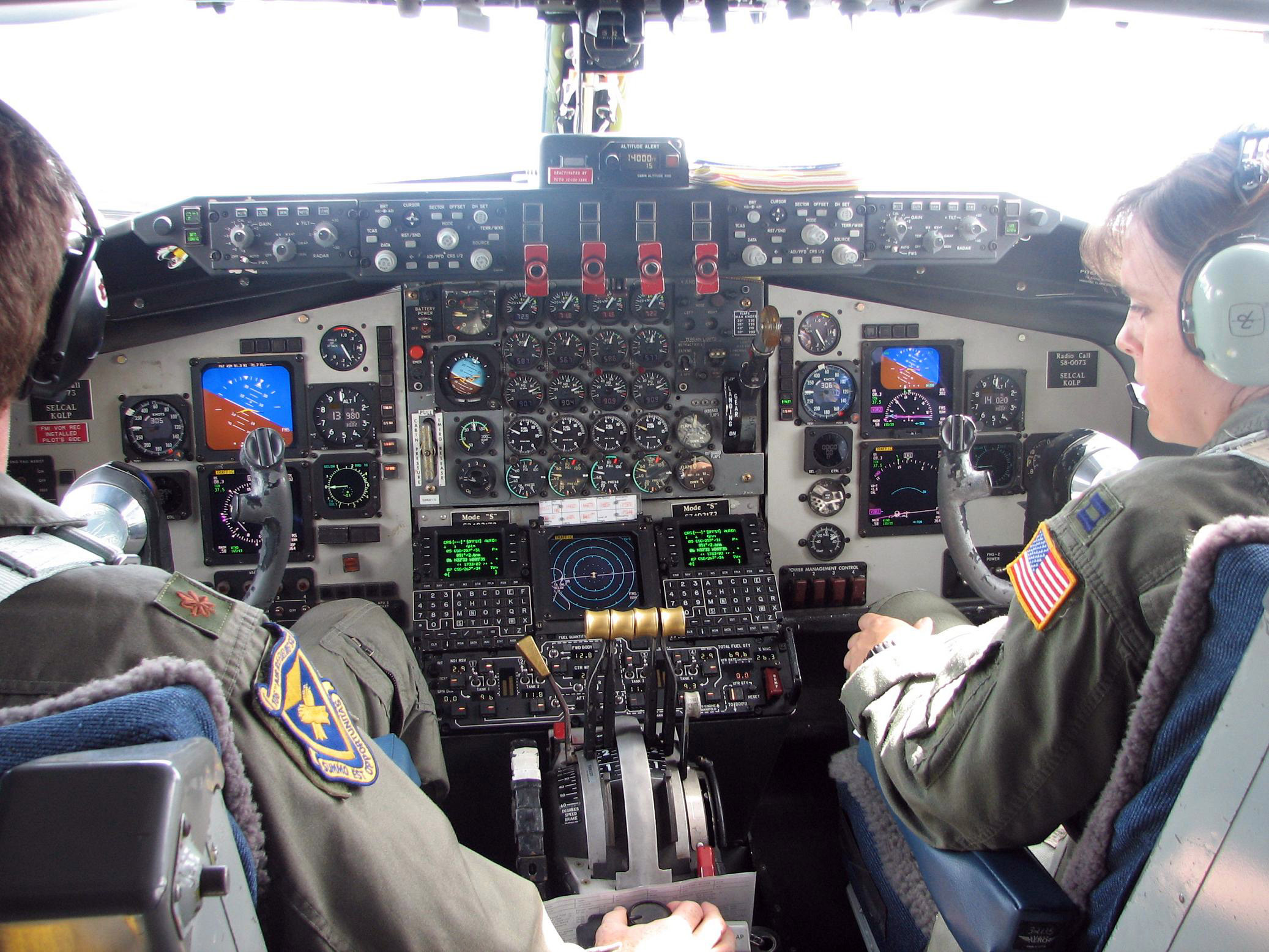
The flight deck of a KC-135R. The instrument panel has been modified under the Pacer-CRAG program.

The second modification program retrofitted 500 aircraft with new CFM International CFM56 (military designation: F108) high-bypass turbofan engines produced by General Electric and Safran. The CFM56 engine produces 22,000 lbf (98 kN) of thrust, nearly double compared to the original J57 engine. The modified tanker, designated KC-135R (modified KC-135A or E) or KC-135T (modified KC-135Q), can offload up to 50% more fuel (on a long-duration sortie), is 25% more fuel-efficient, and costs 25% less to operate than with the previous engines. It is also significantly quieter than the KC-135A, with noise levels at takeoff reduced from 126 to 99 decibels. This 27-decibel noise reduction results in a sound pressure level of about 5% of the original level. The KC-135R's operational range is 60% greater than the KC-135E for comparable fuel offloads, providing a wider range of basing options.

Upgrading the remaining KC-135Es into KC-135Rs is no longer in consideration. This would have cost around US$3 billion, $24 million per aircraft. According to USAF data, the KC-135 fleet had a total operation and support cost in fiscal year 2001 of about $2.2 billion (~$3.81 billion in 2025). The older E model aircraft averaged total costs of about $4.6 million per aircraft, while the R models averaged about $3.7 million per aircraft. Those costs include personnel, fuel, maintenance, modifications, and spare parts.

=== Avionics upgrades ===
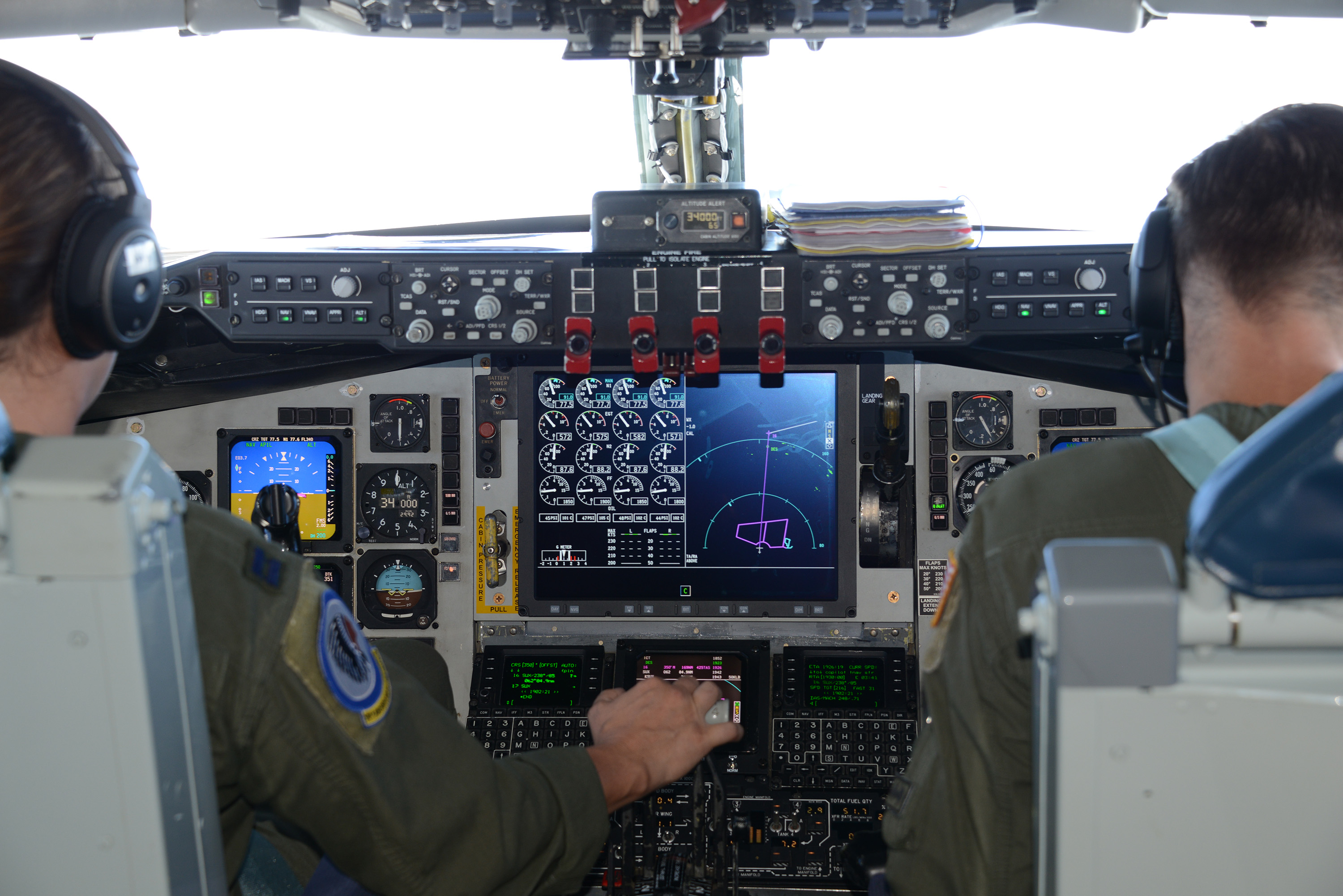
Block 45 glass cockpit

To expand the KC-135's capabilities and improve its reliability, the aircraft has undergone a number of avionics upgrades. Among these was the Pacer-CRAG program (compass, radar, and GPS), which ran from 1999 to 2002 and modified all the aircraft in the inventory to eliminate the navigator position from the flight crew. The fuel-management system was also replaced. The program development was done by Rockwell Collins in Iowa and installation was performed by BAE Systems at the Mojave Airport in California.

Block 40.6 allows the KC-135 to comply with global air-traffic management. The latest block upgrade to the KC-135, the Block 45 program, is online with the first 45 upgraded aircraft delivered by January 2017. Block 45 adds a new glass cockpit digital display, radio altimeter, digital autopilot, digital flight director, and computer updates. The original, no longer procurable analog instruments, including all engine gauges, were replaced. Rockwell Collins again supplied the major avionic modules, with modification done at Tinker AFB.

=== Further upgrades and derivatives ===
The KC-135Q variant was modified to carry JP-7 fuel necessary for the Lockheed SR-71 Blackbird, by separating the JP-7 from the KC-135's own fuel supply. The body tanks carry JP-7, and the wing tanks carry JP-4 or JP-8. The tanker also had special fuel systems for moving the different fuels between tanks. When the KC-135Q model received the CFM56 engines, it was redesignated the KC-135T model, which was capable of separating the main body tanks from the wing tanks, where the KC-135 draws its engine fuel.

The only external difference between a KC-135R and a KC-135T is the presence of a clear window on the underside of the empennage of the KC-135T, where a remote-controlled searchlight is mounted. It has two ground refueling ports, located in each rear wheel well, so ground crews can fuel both the body tanks and wing tanks separately.

A cutaway of the Flight Refueling Limited Mk.32B refueling pod

Eight KC-135R aircraft are receiver-capable tankers, commonly referred to as KC-135R(RT). All eight aircraft were with the 22d Air Refueling Wing at McConnell AFB, Kansas, in 1994. They are primarily used for force extension and special operations missions and are crewed by highly qualified, receiver-capable crews. If not used for the receiver mission, these aircraft can be flown just like any other KC-135R.

The Multi-point Refueling Systems modification adds refueling pods to the KC-135's wings. The pods allow refueling of U.S. Navy, U.S. Marine Corps and most NATO tactical jet aircraft, while keeping the tail-mounted refueling boom. The pods are Flight Refueling Limited MK.32B model pods, and refuel via the probe and drogue method common to Navy/Marine Corps tactical jets, rather than the primary "flying boom" method used by Air Force fixed-wing aircraft. This allows the tanker to refuel two receivers at the same time, which increases throughput compared to the boom drogue adapter.

A number of KC-135A and KC-135B aircraft have been modified to EC-135, RC-135, and OC-135 configurations for use in several different roles. These could also be considered variants of the C-135 Stratolifter family.

== Design ==
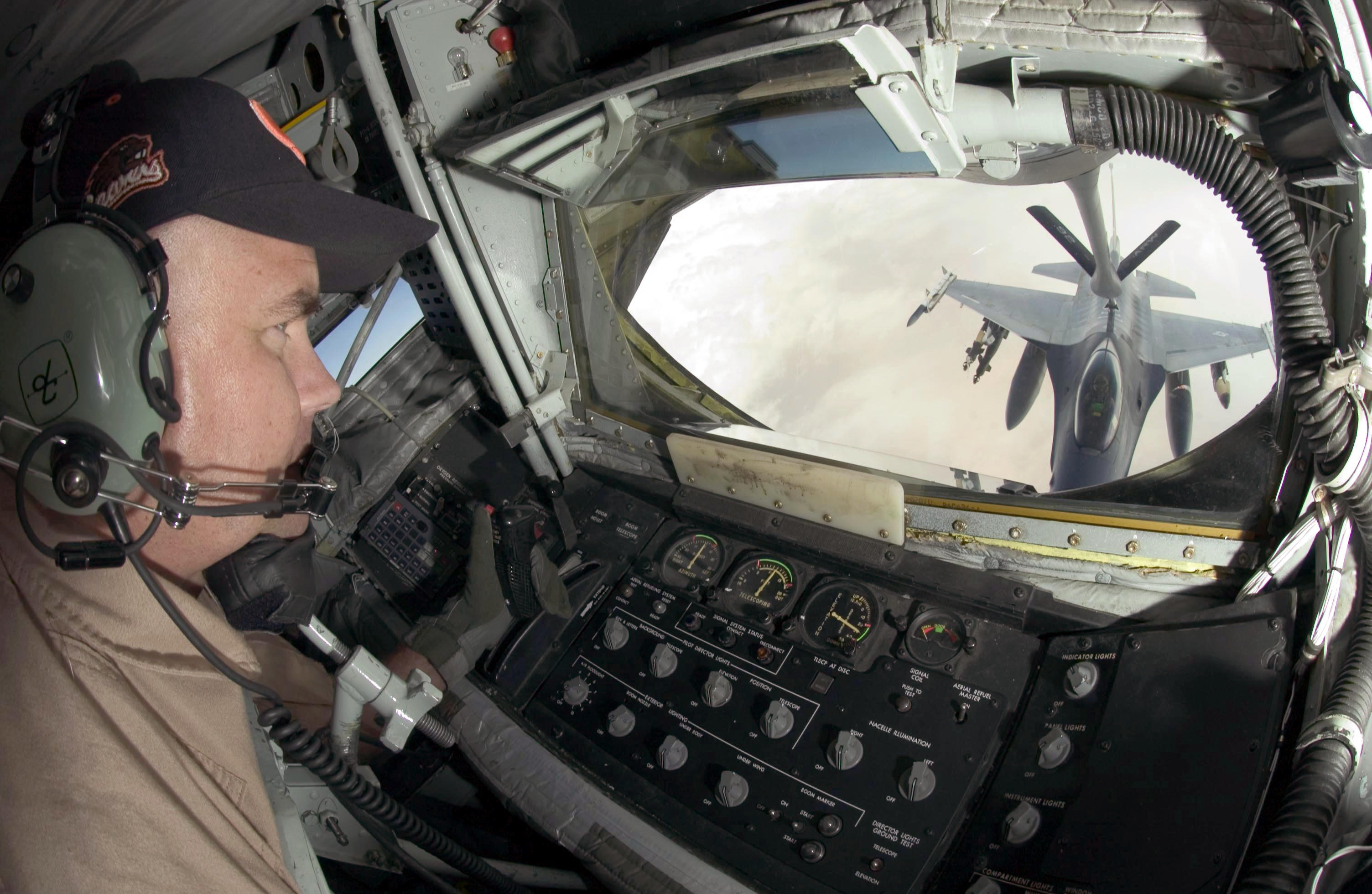
A USAF KC-135R boom operator's view from the boom pod

The KC-135R has four turbofan engines, mounted under 35° swept wings, which power it to takeoffs at gross weights up to 322,500 pounds (146,300 kg). Nearly all internal fuel can be pumped through the tanker's flying boom, the KC-135's primary fuel transfer method. A boom operator stationed in the rear of the aircraft controls the boom while lying prone, viewing through a window at the bottom of the tail. Both the flying boom and operator's station are similar to those of the previous KC-97.

A special shuttlecock-shaped drogue, attached to and trailing behind the flying boom, may be used to refuel aircraft fitted with probes. This apparatus is significantly more unforgiving of pilot error in the receiving aircraft than conventional trailing hose arrangements; an aircraft so fitted is incapable of refueling by the normal flying-boom method until the attachment is removed. A Cargo deck above the refueling system can hold a mixed load of passengers and cargo. Depending on fuel storage configuration, the KC-135 can carry up to 83,000 pounds (38,000 kg) of cargo.

== Operational history ==
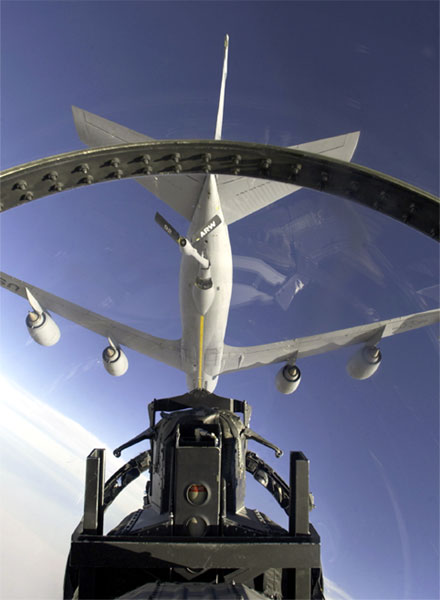
An F-15 backs out after refueling from a KC-135R.

The KC-135 was introduced to support SAC bombers, but by the late 1960s, in the Southeast Asia theater, the KC-135 Stratotanker's ability as a force multiplier came to the fore. Midair refueling of F-105 and F-4 fighter-bombers, as well as B-52 bombers, brought far-flung bombing targets within reach and allowed fighter missions to spend hours at the front, rather than a few minutes, which was usual due to their limited fuel reserves and high fuel consumption.

KC-135 crews refueled USAF, Navy, and Marine Corps aircraft. They changed to probe and drogue adapters depending upon the mission, with the Navy and Marine Corps aircraft not having flying-boom receptacles, since the USAF boom system was impractical for aircraft carrier operations. Crews also helped to bring in damaged aircraft, which could sometimes fly while being fed by fuel to a landing site, or to ditch over the water, specifically those with punctured fuel tanks. KC-135s continued their tactical-support role in later conflicts such as Operation Desert Storm and current aerial strategy.

Strategic Air Command had the KC-135 Stratotanker in service with Regular Air Force SAC units from 1957 to 1992 and with SAC-gained ANG and AFR units from 1975 to 1992. Following a major USAF reorganization that resulted in the inactivation of SAC in 1992, most KC-135s were reassigned to the newly created AMC. A small number of KC-135s were also assigned directly to United States Air Forces in Europe (USAFE), Pacific Air Forces (PACAF) and the Air Education and Training Command (AETC). All AFRC KC-135s and most of the ANG KC-135 fleet became operationally gained by AMC. Alaska Air National Guard and Hawaii Air National Guard KC-135s became operationally gained by PACAF.

AMC managed 396 Stratotankers, of which the AFR and ANG flew 243 in support of AMC's mission as of May 2018. The KC-135 is one of a few military aircraft types with over 50 years of continuous service with its original operator as of 2009.

Israel was offered KC-135s again in 2013, after turning down the aging aircraft twice due to expense of keeping them flying. The IAF again rejected the offered KC-135Es, but said that it would consider up to a dozen of the newer KC-135Rs.

As of 2025, the oldest active aircraft in the U.S. military is KC-135 57-1419, in service with the 161st Air Refueling Wing, based out of Goldwater Air National Guard Base, Arizona. The aircraft was built in 1957, and as of 2013 had 22,300 flight hours.

On 28 February 2026, KC-135s provided aerial refueling support during Operation Epic Fury, a large-scale, joint US-Israeli military operation against Iran. The U.S. deployed over 30 KC-135 and KC-46 tankers to Israel in advance of the strikes alongside F-22, F-35 fighters, B-2 bombers and other planes. United States Central Command (CENTCOM) described the operation as "the largest regional concentration of American military firepower in a generation". On 12 March 2026, a KC-135 crashed in western Iraq killing all six crew members. The crash is thought to be the result of an incident involving another aerial refuelling aircraft.

An Iranian missile and drone attack on Prince Sultan Air Base in Saudi Arabia left multiple US aircraft destroyed or damaged, including at least one KC-135.

During the 2026 Iran war, Iranian attacks on U.S. bases in the Middle East destroyed or damaged 12 KC-135 Stratotanker refueling aircraft, according to a Pentagon inspector general report cited by The Intercept.

=== Research usage ===
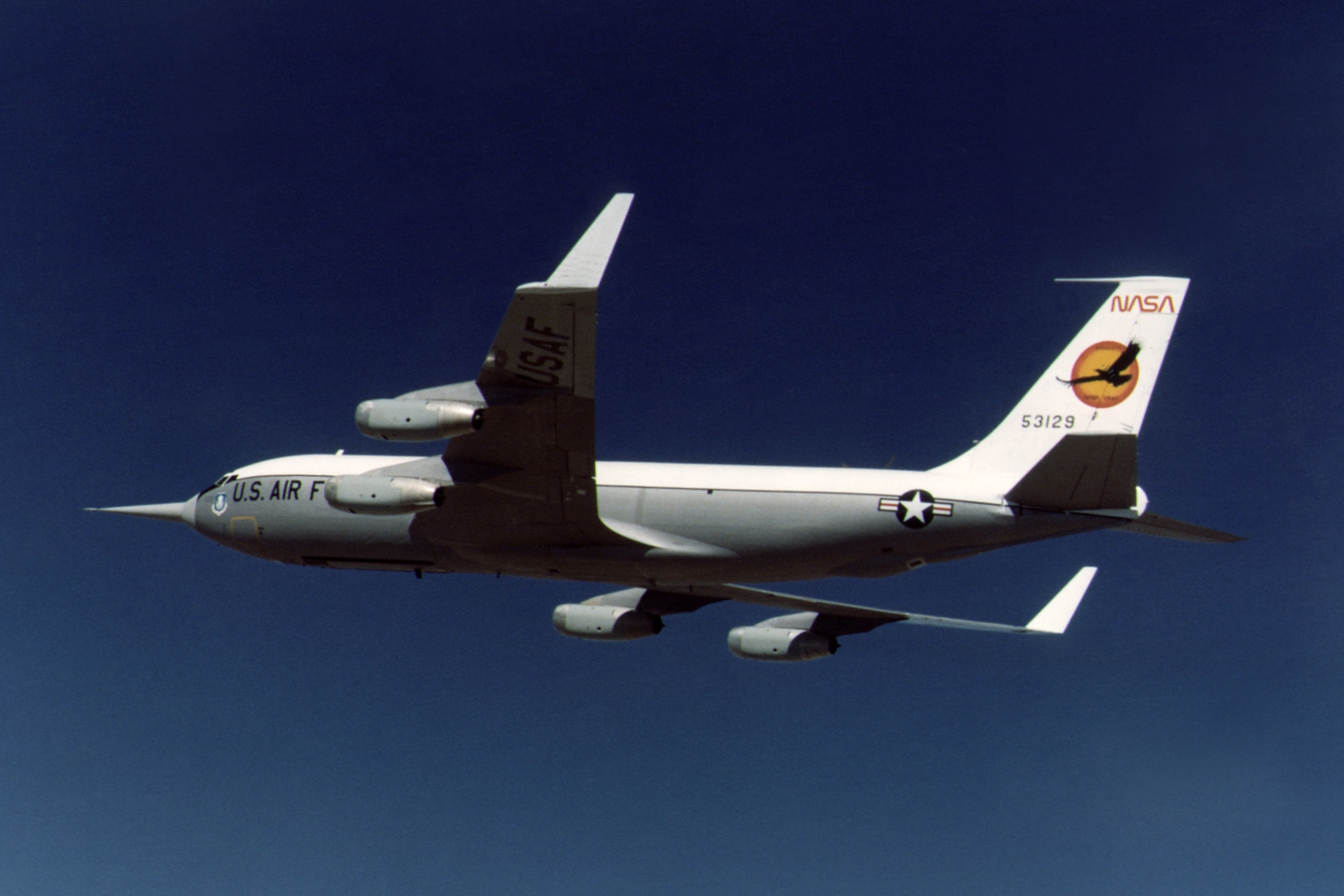
KC-135 winglet flight tests at Armstrong Flight Research Center

Besides its primary role as an inflight aircraft refueler, the KC-135, designated NKC-135, has assisted in several research projects at the NASA Armstrong Flight Research Center at Edwards Air Force Base, California. One such project occurred between 1979 and 1980, when special wingtip "winglets", developed by Richard Whitcomb of the Langley Research Center, were tested at Armstrong, using an NKC-135A tanker lent to NASA by the USAF. Winglets are small, nearly vertical fins installed on an aircraft's wing tips. The results of the research showed that drag was reduced and range could be increased by as much as 7% at cruise speeds. Winglets are now being incorporated into most new commercial and military transport/passenger jets, as well as business aviation jets.

NASA has operated several KC-135 aircraft, without the tanker equipment installed, as their famed Vomit Comet zero-gravity simulator aircraft. From 1973 to 1995, the longest-serving version was KC-135A, AF Ser. No. 59-1481, named Weightless Wonder IV and registered as N930NA.

=== Replacements ===
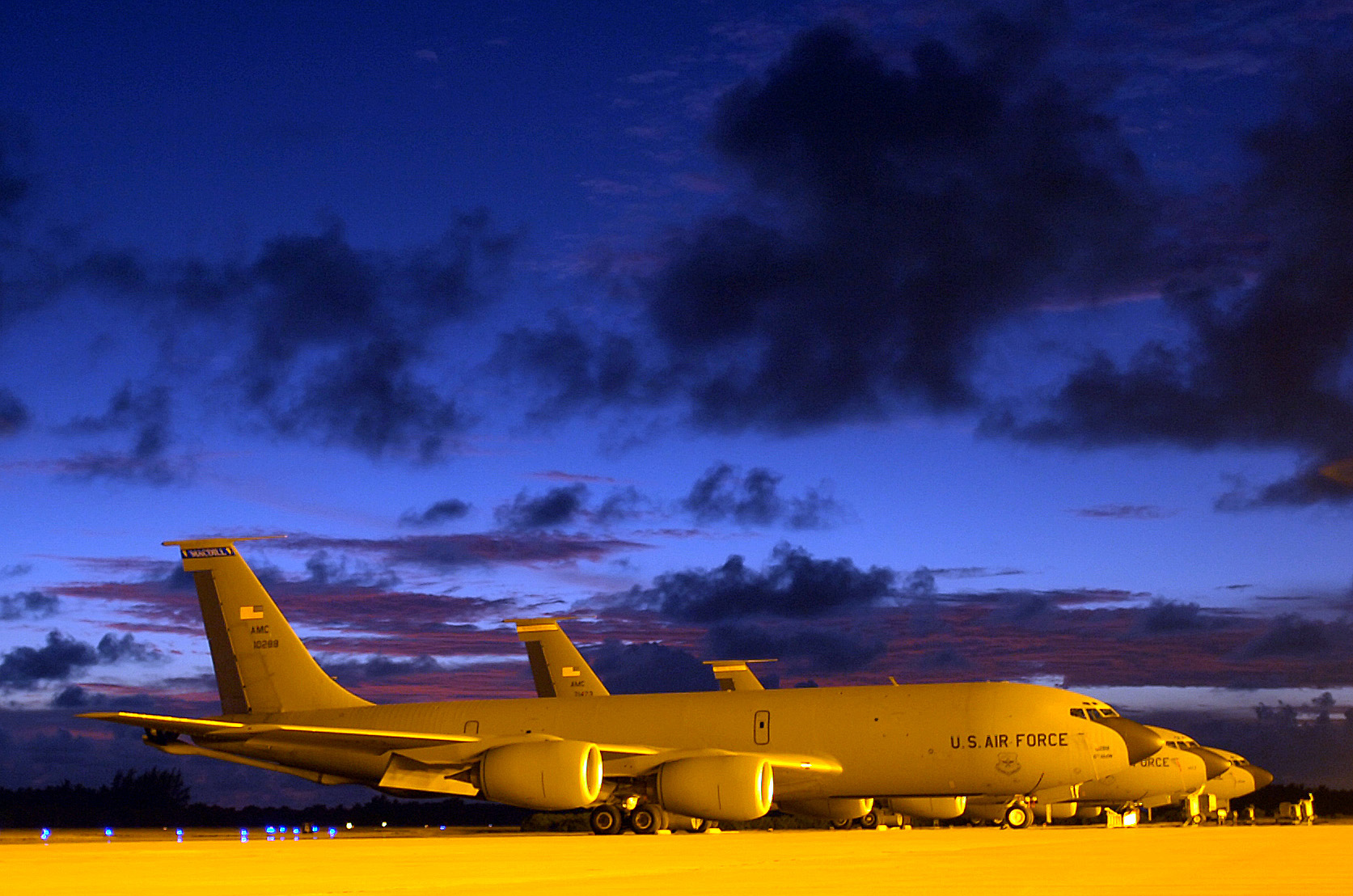
KC-135Rs at twilight on the flight line

Between 1993 and 2003, the amount of KC-135 depot maintenance work doubled, and the overhaul cost per aircraft tripled. In 1996, it cost $8,400 per flight hour for the KC-135. In 2002, this had grown to $11,000. In 2004, the USAF's 15-year estimates projected significant cost growth to fiscal year 2017. KC-135 fleet operations and support costs were estimated to grow from about $2.2 billion in fiscal year 2003 to $5.1 billion (2003 dollars) in fiscal year 2017, an increase over 130%, which represented an annual operating cost growth rate of about 6.2%.

The USAF projected that E and R models have lifetime flying hour limits of 36,000 and 39,000 hours, respectively. Accordingly, only a few KC-135s would reach these limits by 2040, when some aircraft would be about 80 years old. A 2005 USAF study estimated that KC-135Es upgraded to the R standard could remain in use until 2030.

In 2006, the KC-135E fleet was flying an annual average of 350 hours per aircraft. The KC-135R fleet was flying an annual average of 710 hours per aircraft. In March 2009, the Air Force indicated that KC-135s would require additional skin replacement to allow their continued use beyond 2018.

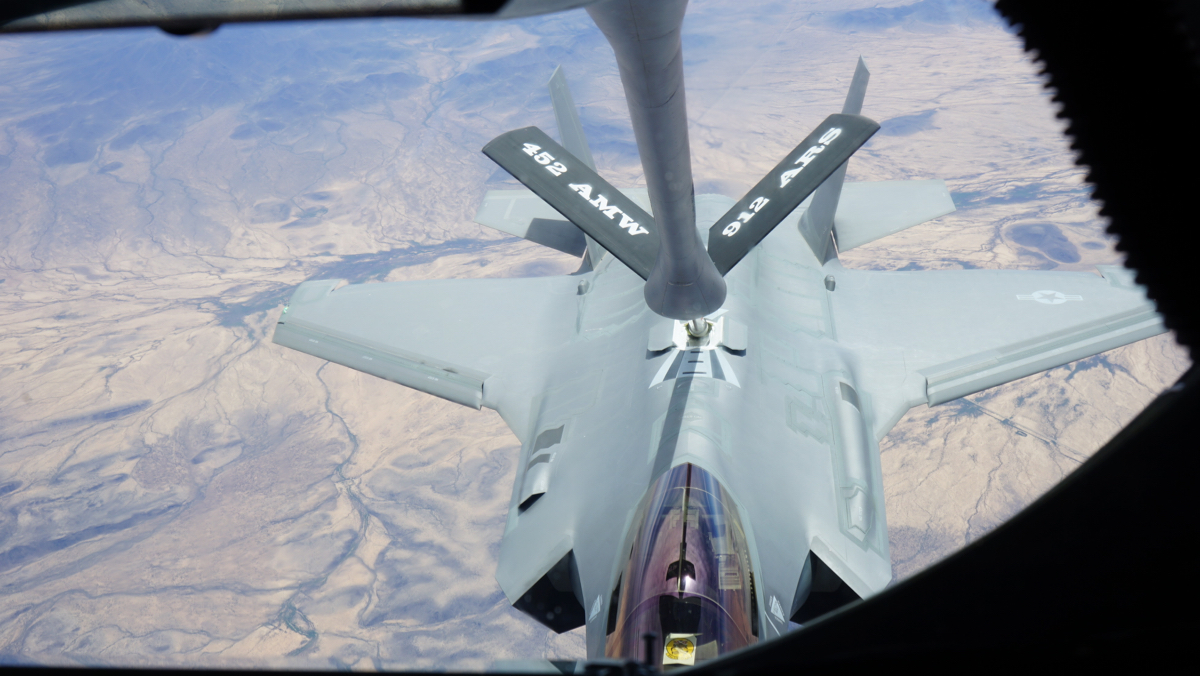
The view from the boom operator's hatch as a F-35 takes on fuel from a KC-135

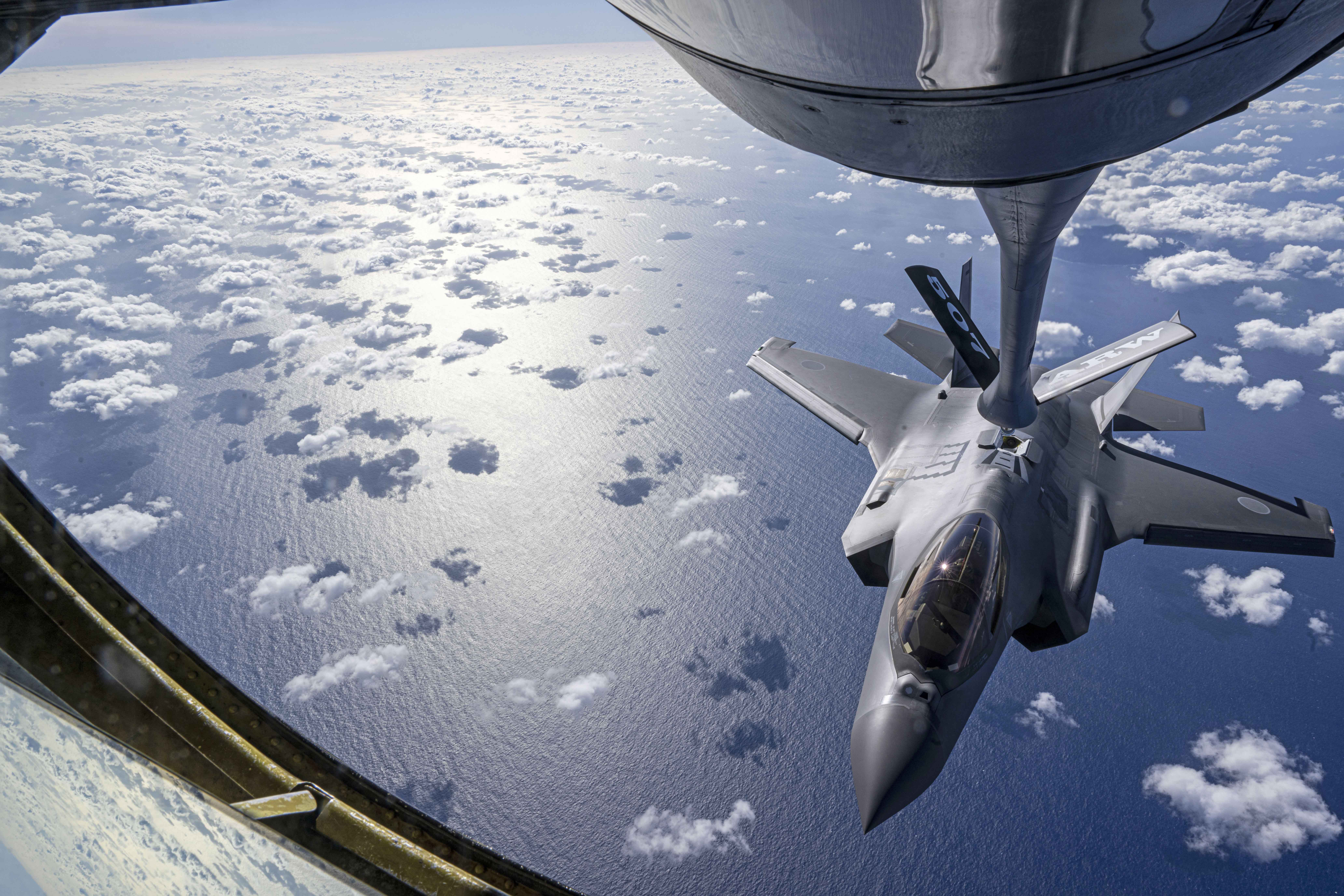
A JASDF F-35A Lightning II prepares to receive fuel from a USAF KC-135, 2025.

The USAF decided to replace the KC-135 fleet; it is large, so will need to be replaced gradually. The first batch of replacement planes was to be an air tanker version of the Boeing 767, leased from Boeing. In 2003, this was changed to contract where the USAF would purchase 80 KC-767 aircraft and lease 20 more. In December 2003, the Pentagon froze the contract and in January 2006, the KC-767 contract was canceled. This move followed public revelations of corruption in how the contract was awarded and controversy regarding the original leasing rather than outright purchase agreement. Then-Secretary of Defense Rumsfeld stated that that move would in no way impair the Air Force's ability to deliver the mission of the KC-767, which would be accomplished by implementing continuing upgrades to the KC-135 and KC-10 Extender fleet.

In January 2007, the USAF launched the KC-X program with a request for proposal (RFP). KC-X was the first phase of three acquisition programs meant to replace the KC-135 fleet. In February 2008, the US Defense Department selected the EADS/Northrop Grumman "KC-30" (to be designated the KC-45A) over the Boeing KC-767. In March 2008, Boeing protested the award, citing irregularities in the competition and bid evaluation. In June 2008, the US Government Accountability Office sustained Boeing's protest of the selection of the Northrop Grumman/EADS's tanker.

In February 2010, the USAF restarted the KC-X competition with the release of a revised RFP. In February 2011, after evaluating bids, the USAF selected Boeing's 767-based tanker design as a replacement, with the military designation KC-46. The first KC-46A Pegasus was delivered to the USAF in January 2019.

Two export users of the KC-135, the French Air and Space Force and the Republic of Singapore Air Force, took deliveries of Airbus A330 MRTTs as replacements for their Stratotankers.

== Variants ==
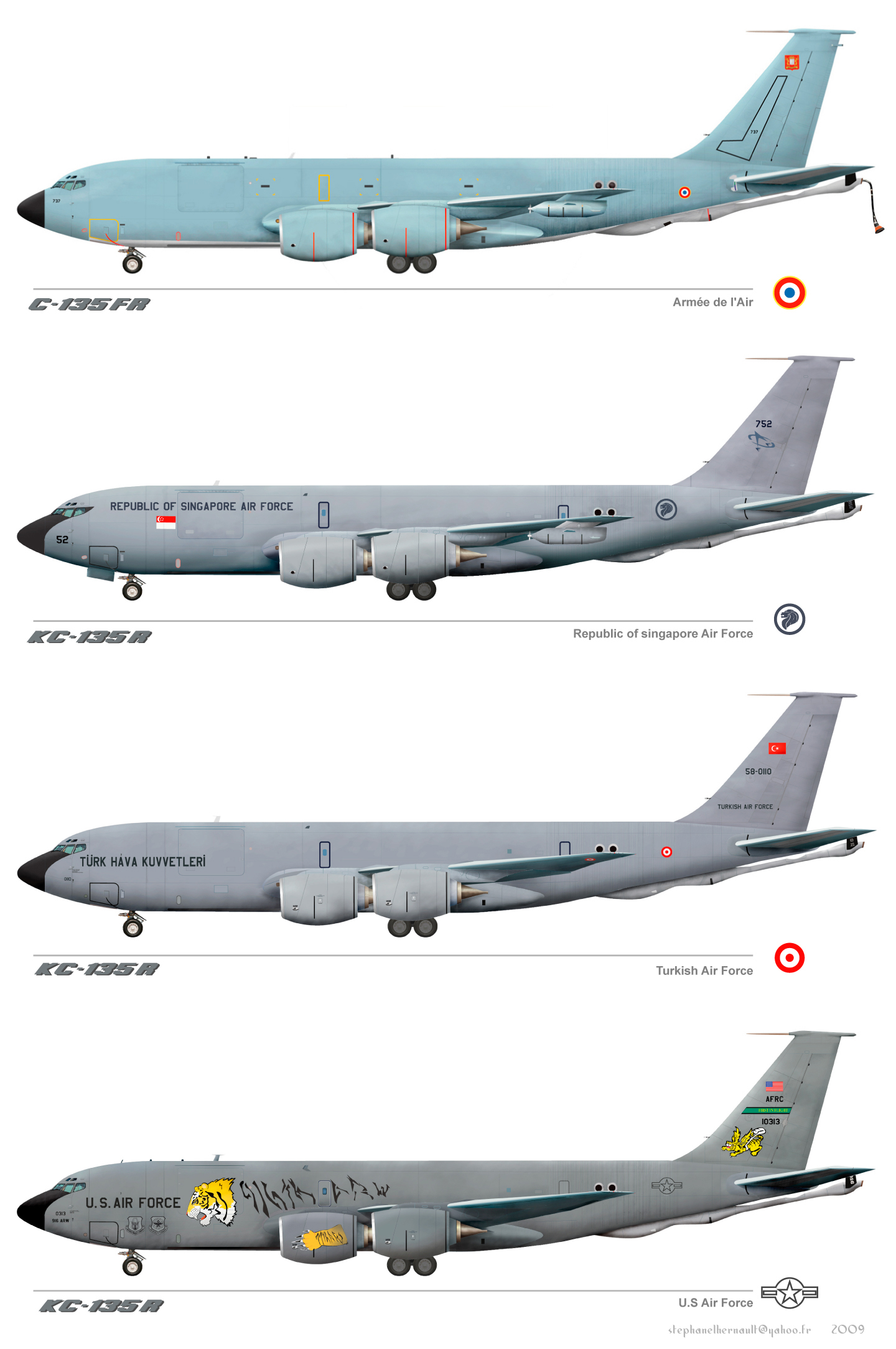
Active KC-135 aircraft liveries

=== KC-135A ===
Original production version powered by four Pratt & Whitney J57s, 732 built. Initial production batch of 29 aircraft was given the company designation Model 717-100A, while the later batches of 68 and 635 aircraft were respectively designated 717-146 and 717-148.

=== NKC-135A ===
Test-configured KC-135A.

=== KC-135B ===
Airborne command post version equipped with turbofan engines, 17 built. Provided with in-flight refueling capability and redesignated EC-135C. Company designation Model 717-166.

=== KC-135D ===
All four RC-135As (Pacer Swan) were modified to partial KC-135A configuration in 1979. The four aircraft (serial numbers 63-8058, 63-8059, 63-8060 and 63-8061) were given a unique designation KC-135D as they differed from the KC-135A in that they were built with a flight engineer's position on the flight deck. The flight engineer's position was removed when the aircraft were modified to KC-135 standards. They retained their electrically powered wing flap secondary (emergency) drive mechanism and second air conditioning pack which had been used to cool the RC-135As on-board photo-mapping systems. Later re-engined with Pratt & Whitney TF33 engines and a cockpit update to KC-135E standards in 1990 and were retired to the 309th AMARG at Davis-Monthan AFB, AZ in 2007.

=== KC-135E ===
Air National Guard and Air Force Reserve KC-135As re-engined with Pratt & Whitney TF33-PW-102 engines from retired 707 airliners (161 modified). All E model aircraft were retired to the 309th AMARG at Davis-Monthan AFB by September 2009 and replaced with R models.

=== NKC-135E ===
Test-configured KC-135E aircraft, 55-3132 NKC-135E "Big Crow I" and 63-8050 NKC-135B "Big Crow II" were used as airborne targets for the Boeing YAL-1 Airborne Laser carrier.

=== KC-135Q ===
KC-135As modified to carry JP-7 fuel necessary for the SR-71 Blackbird, 56 modified, survivors to KC-135T.

=== KC-135R (1960s) ===
4 JC/KC-135As converted to Rivet Stand (Later Rivet Quick) configuration for reconnaissance and evaluation of above ground nuclear test (55-3121, 59–1465, 59–1514, 58–0126; 58-0126 replaced 59-1465 after it crashed in 1967). These aircraft were powered by Pratt & Whitney J57 engines and were based at Offutt AFB, Nebraska.

=== KC-135R ===
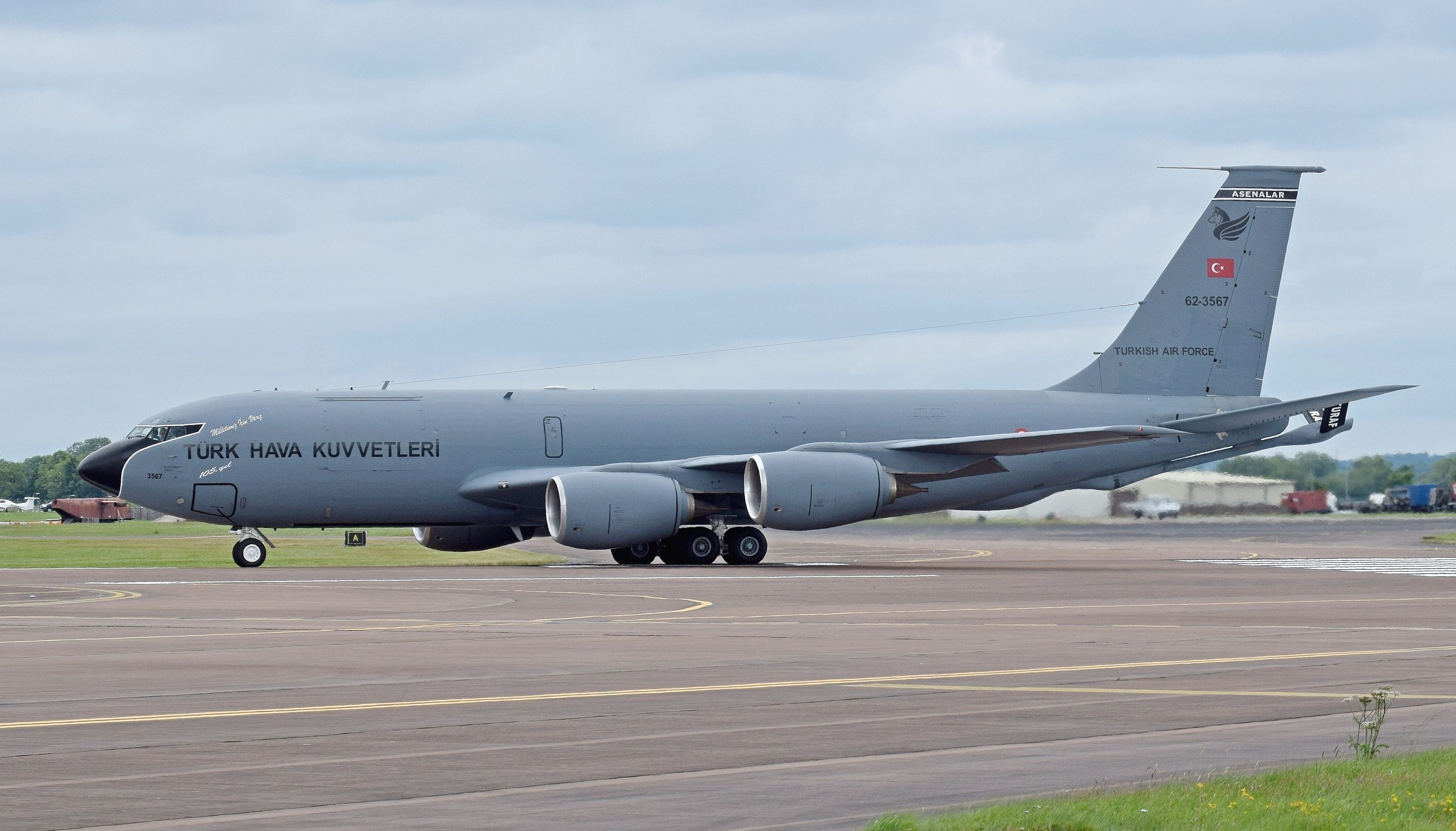
A Boeing KC-135R Stratotanker of the Turkish Air Force arrives at the 2016 Royal International Air Tattoo, England

KC-135As and some KC-135Es re-engined with CFM56 engines, more than 417 converted.

=== KC-135R(RT) ===
Receiver-capable KC-135R Stratotanker; eight modified with either a Boeing or LTV receiver system and a secure voice SATCOM radio. Three of the aircraft (60-0356, -0357, and -0362) were converted to tankers from RC-135Ds, from which they retained their added equipment.

=== KC-135T ===
KC-135Q re-engined with CFM56 engines, 54 modified.

=== C-135F ===
A new-built variant for France as dual-role tanker/cargo and troop carrier aircraft. 12 were built for the French Air Force with the addition of a drogue adapter on the refueling boom. Given Boeing model numbers 717-164 and 717-165.

=== C-135FR ===
11 surviving C-135Fs upgraded with CFM International F108 turbofans between 1985 and 1988. Later modified with MPRS wing pods.

=== EC-135Y ===
An airborne command post modified in 1984 to support CINCCENT. Aircraft 55-3125 was the only EC-135Y. Unlike its sister EC-135N, it was a true tanker that could also receive in-flight refueling. Pratt & Whitney TF33-PW-102. Retired to 309th AMARG at Davis-Monthan AFB, AZ.

== Operators ==
Chile

- Chilean Air Force operates 3 KC-135Es. It received its first KC-135E in February 2010.

India

- Indian Air Force: One has been wet leased from Metrea for training IAF and the Indian Navy pilots. Requirement for such an aircraft was reported in August 2023. The refuelling aircraft is based at Agra Air Force Station and will aid in pilot training for the IAF and the Indian Naval Air Arm prior to retirement of Il-78MKI. The jet landed at Agra AFS on 21 November 2025.

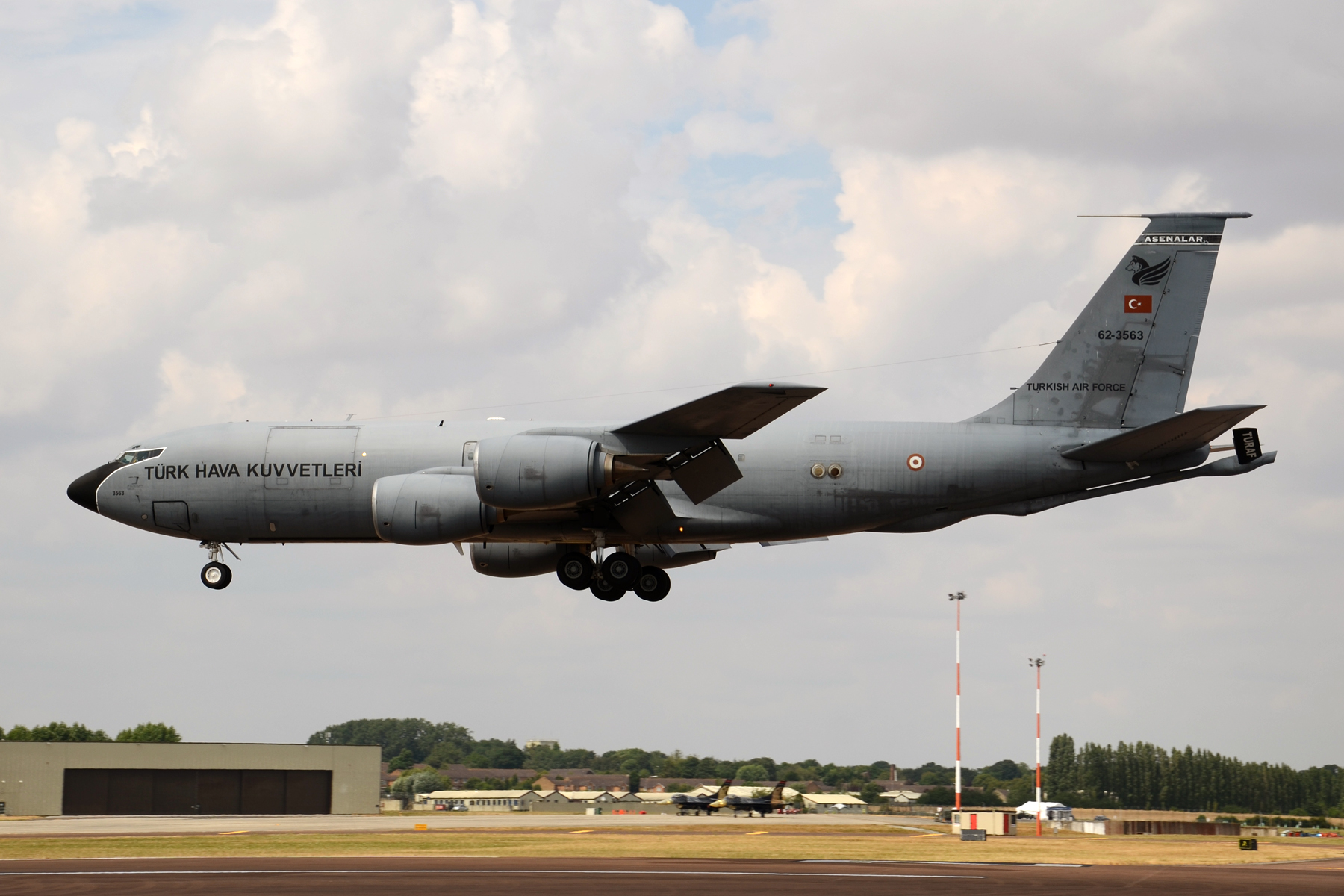
Turkish KC-135R Stratotanker nicknamed Asena.

Turkey

- Turkish Air Force operates 7 KC-135Rs.

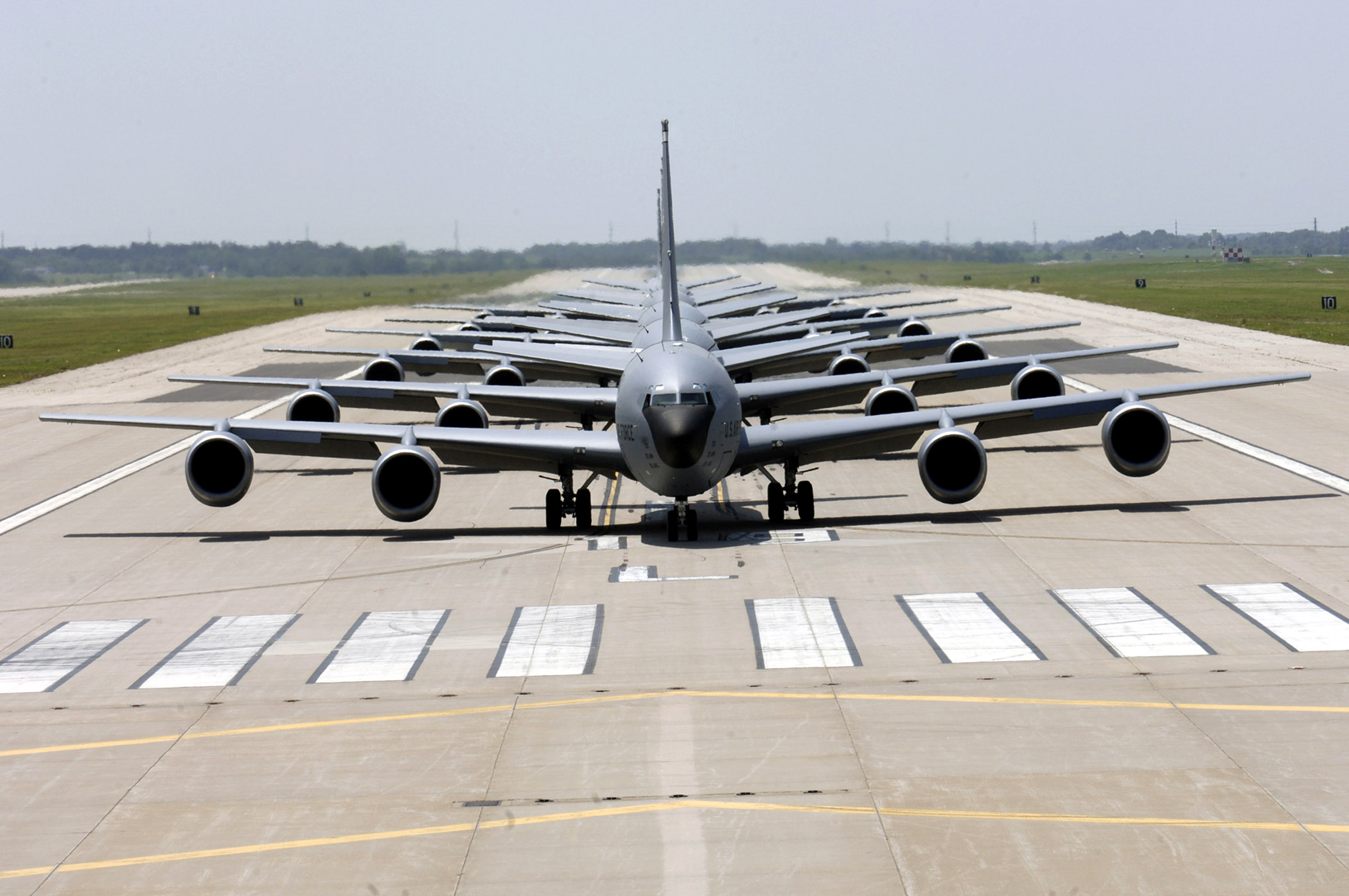
Six KC-135 Stratotankers demonstrate the elephant walk formation.

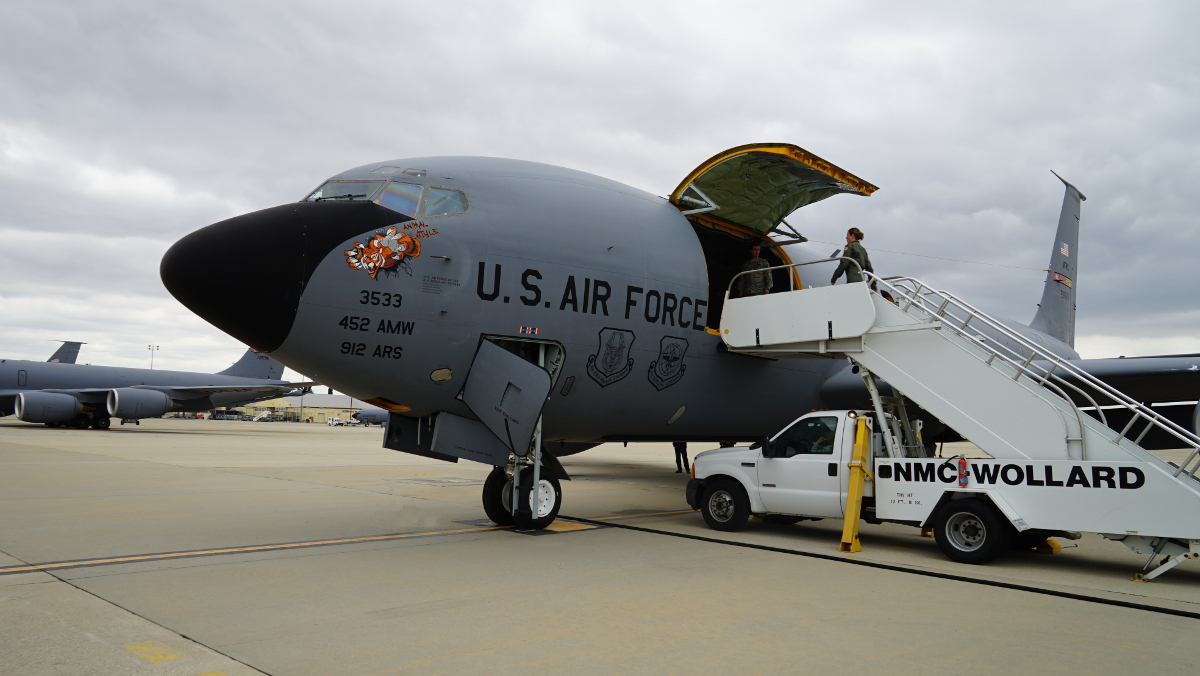
The cargo door of a USAF KC-135 at March Air Reserve Base

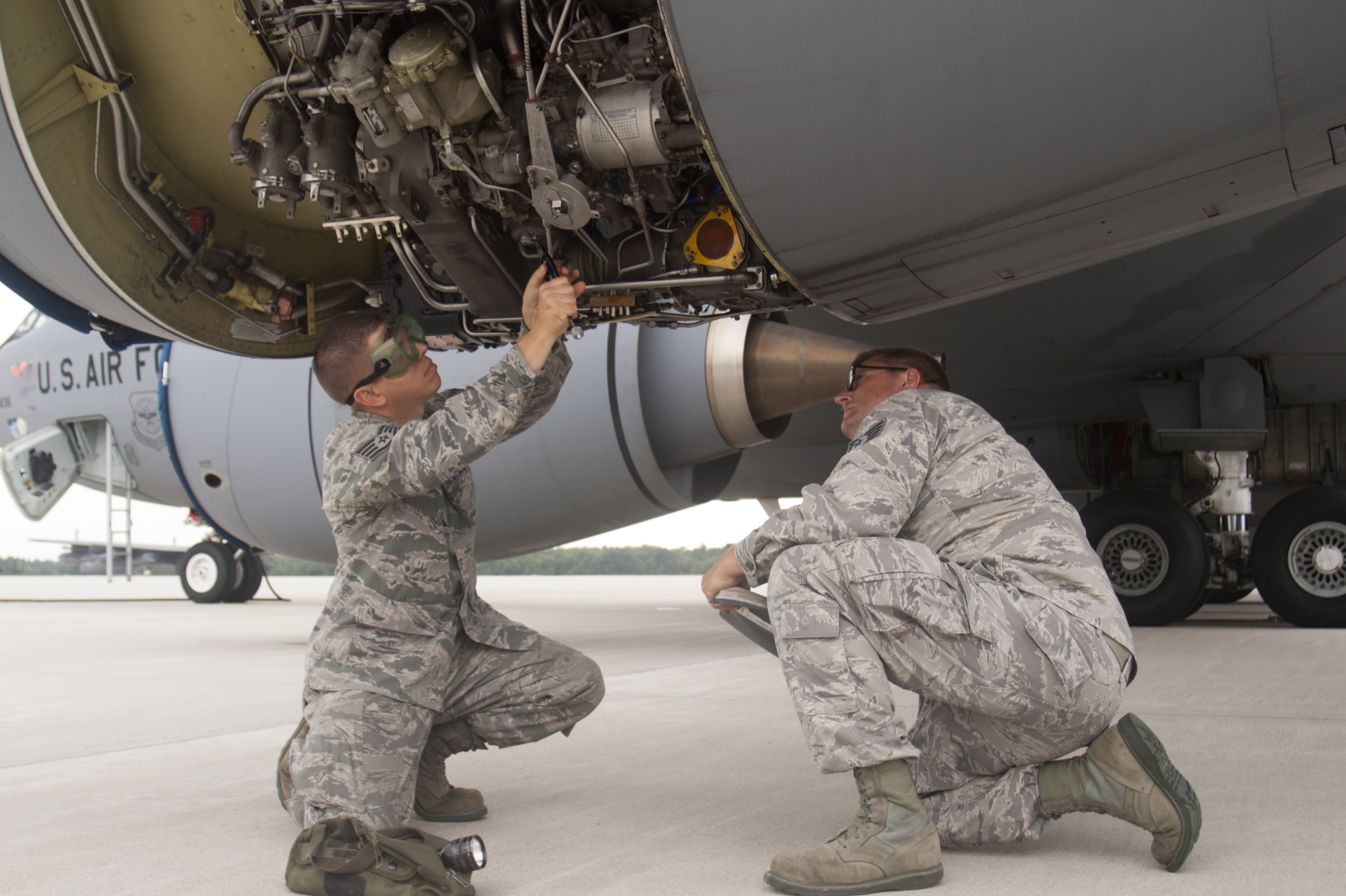
Personnel working on a KC-135R at Pease ANGB, September 2013

United States

- United States Air Force operates 375 KC-135s (157 active duty, 62 Air Force Reserve, and 156 Air National Guard) as of June 2026.
  - 57th Wing – Nellis Air Force Base, Nevada
    - 509th Weapons Squadron – Fairchild Air Force Base, Washington
  - 97th Air Mobility Wing – Altus Air Force Base, Oklahoma
    - 54th Air Refueling Squadron
  - 412th Test Wing – Edwards AFB, California
    - 412th Flight Test Squadron
    - 418th Flight Test Squadron
  - 6th Air Refueling Wing – MacDill AFB, Florida
    - 50th Air Refueling Squadron
    - 91st Air Refueling Squadron
    - 99th Air Refueling Squadron – Birmingham Air National Guard Base, Alabama (Associate with 117th ARW)
  - 22d Air Refueling Wing – McConnell AFB, Kansas
    - 350th Air Refueling Squadron
  - 92d Air Refueling Wing – Fairchild AFB, Washington
    - 92d Air Refueling Squadron
    - 93d Air Refueling Squadron
    - 97th Air Refueling Squadron
    - 384th Air Refueling Squadron
    - 912th Air Refueling Squadron – March ARB, California (Associate with 452d ARW)
  - 375th Air Mobility Wing – Scott AFB, Illinois
    - 906th Air Refueling Squadron (associate with 126th ARW)
  - 18th Wing – Kadena AB, Japan
    - 909th Air Refueling Squadron
  - 100th Air Refueling Wing – RAF Mildenhall, England, UK
    - 351st Air Refueling Squadron
- Air Force Reserve
  - 434th Air Refueling Wing – Grissom ARB, Indiana
    - 72d Air Refueling Squadron
    - 74th Air Refueling Squadron
  - 452d Air Mobility Wing – March ARB, California
    - 336th Air Refueling Squadron
  - 459th Air Refueling Wing – Andrews AFB, Maryland
    - 756th Air Refueling Squadron
  - 507th Air Refueling Wing – Tinker AFB, Oklahoma
    - 465th Air Refueling Squadron
    - 730th Air Mobility Training Squadron (Altus AFB, Oklahoma)
  - 914th Air Refueling Wing – Niagara Falls International Airport, New York
    - 328th Air Refueling Squadron
  - 927th Air Refueling Wing – MacDill AFB, Florida (Associate with 6th AMW)
    - 63d Air Refueling Squadron
  - 931st Air Refueling Group – McConnell AFB, Kansas (Associate with 22d ARW)
    - 18th Air Refueling Squadron
  - 940th Air Refueling Wing – Beale AFB, California
    - 314th Air Refueling Squadron
- Air National Guard
  - 101st Air Refueling Wing – Bangor, Maine
    - 132d Air Refueling Squadron
  - 117th Air Refueling Wing – Birmingham, Alabama
    - 106th Air Refueling Squadron
  - 121st Air Refueling Wing – Rickenbacker ANGB, Ohio
    - 166th Air Refueling Squadron
  - 126th Air Refueling Wing – Scott AFB, Illinois
    - 108th Air Refueling Squadron
  - 127th Wing – Selfridge ANGB, Michigan
    - 171st Air Refueling Squadron
  - 128th Air Refueling Wing – Milwaukee, Wisconsin
    - 126th Air Refueling Squadron
  - 134th Air Refueling Wing – Knoxville, Tennessee
    - 151st Air Refueling Squadron
  - 141st Air Refueling Wing – Fairchild AFB, Washington (Associate with 92d ARW)
    - 116th Air Refueling Squadron
  - 151st Wing – Salt Lake City, Utah
    - 191st Air Refueling Squadron
  - 154th Wing – Hickam AFB, Hawaii
    - 203d Air Refueling Squadron
  - 155th Air Refueling Wing – Lincoln, Nebraska
    - 173rd Air Refueling Squadron
  - 161st Air Refueling Wing – Phoenix Sky Harbor International Airport / Goldwater Air National Guard Base, Arizona
    - 197th Air Refueling Squadron
  - 168th Air Refueling Wing – Eielson AFB, Alaska
    - 168th Air Refueling Squadron
  - 171st Air Refueling Wing – Pittsburgh IAP Air Reserve Station, Pennsylvania
    - 146th Air Refueling Squadron
    - 147th Air Refueling Squadron
  - 185th Air Refueling Wing – Sioux City, Iowa
    - 174th Air Refueling Squadron
  - 186th Air Refueling Wing – Meridian, Mississippi
    - 153d Air Refueling Squadron
  - 190th Air Refueling Wing – Topeka, Kansas
    - 117th Air Refueling Squadron

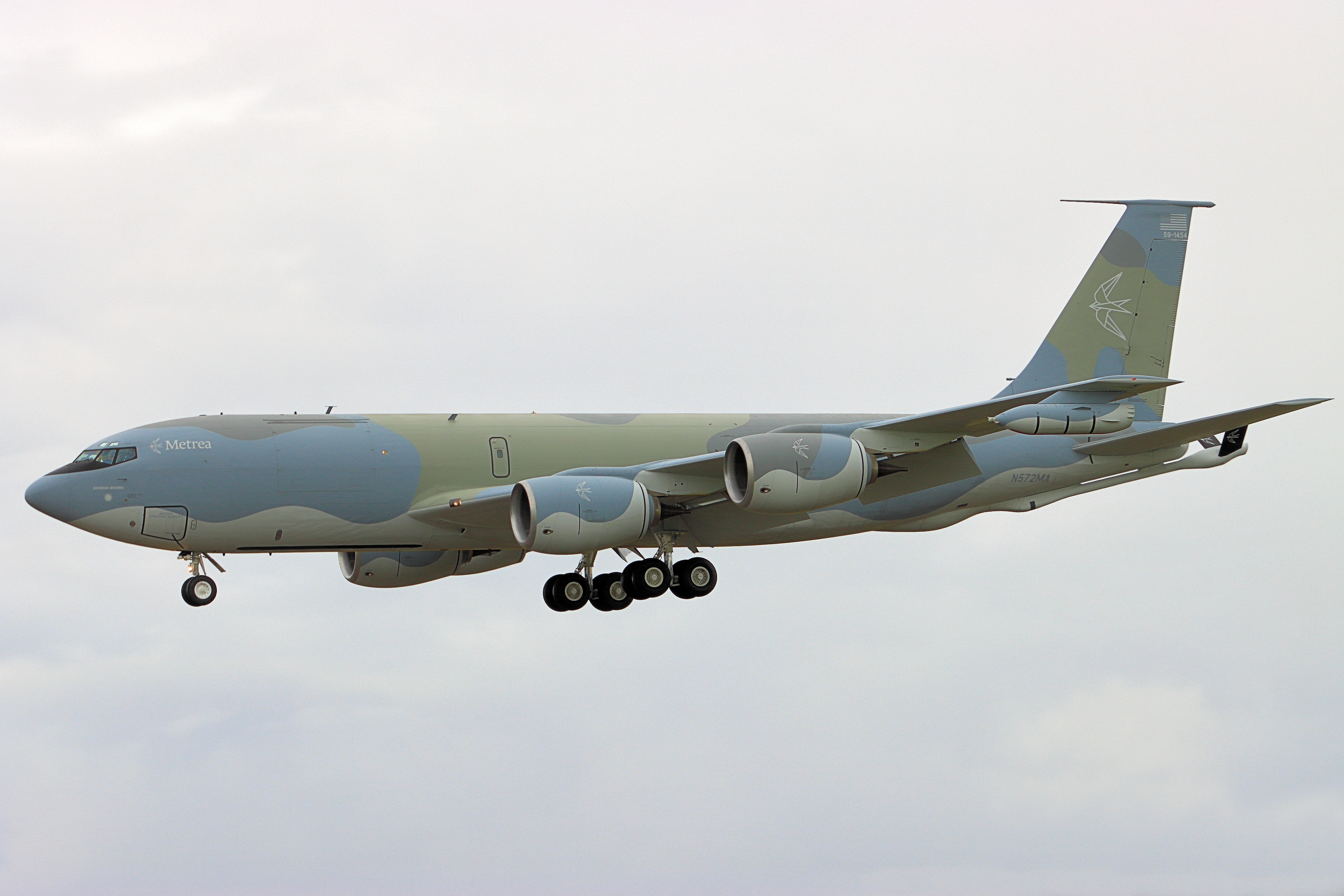
KC-135R of Metrea at Royal International Air Tattoo 2023

- Metrea (Formerly Meta Aerospace) operates 15 KC-135Rs. 4 aircraft were purchased from the Republic of Singapore Air Force when the latter retired them in 2019. They were delivered in late 2020. 11 more aircraft were purchased from the French Air and Space Force in June 2024, with 3 more to be delivered at an undetermined date.

Note Italy has been reported in some sources as operating several KC-135s, however these are Boeing 707-300s converted to tanker configuration.

=== Former operators ===
France

- French Air and Space Force operated 12 C-135FRs, beginning in 1964. They were replaced by Airbus A330 MRTTs, French military designation Phénix, from October 2020 to December 2023. The tankers were sold to private aerospace firm Metrea in June 2024.

Singapore

- Republic of Singapore Air Force operated 4 former USAF KC-135R tankers, first delivered September 1999. They were occasionally used as VIP, aeromedical transports and military support. The aircraft were retired in June 2019, replaced by 6 Airbus A330 MRTTs. They were purchased by private US defense services company Metrea (Formerly Meta Aerospace) in October 2020.

United States

- NASA (until 2004)
- United States Air Force
  - 6th Air Refueling Wing – MacDill AFB, Florida
    - 911th Air Refueling Squadron – Seymour-Johnson AFB, North Carolina (Associate with 916th ARW)
  - 22d Air Refueling Wing – McConnell AFB, Kansas
    - 344th Air Refueling Squadron
  - 97th Air Mobility Wing – Altus Air Force Base, Oklahoma
    - 55th Air Refueling Squadron (1994–2009)
  - 916th Air Refueling Wing – Seymour Johnson AFB, North Carolina
    - 77th Air Refueling Squadron
  - 931st Air Refueling Group – McConnell AFB, Kansas (Associate with 22d ARW)
    - 924th Air Refueling Squadron
- Air National Guard
  - 107th Air Refueling Wing – Niagara Falls ARS, New York
    - 136th Air Refueling Squadron (1994–2008)
  - 108th Air Refueling Wing – McGuire AFB, New Jersey
    - 141st Air Refueling Squadron (2007–2023)
  - 121st Air Refueling Wing – Rickenbacker ANGB, Ohio
    - 145th Air Refueling Squadron (1975–2013)
  - 137th Air Refueling Wing – Tinker AFB, Oklahoma
    - 185th Air Refueling Squadron (2008–2015)
  - 157th Air Refueling Wing – Pease ANGB, New Hampshire
    - 133d Air Refueling Squadron (1975–2019)
  - 163rd Air Refueling Wing – March ARB, California
    - 196th Air Refueling Squadron (1993–2006)
  - 184th Air Refueling Wing – McConnell AFB, Kansas
    - 127th Air Refueling Squadron (2002–2008)
  - 189th Air Refueling Wing – Little Rock AFB, Arkansas
    - 154th Air Refueling Squadron (1973–1986)

== Accidents ==
Since entering into service in 1955, 52 Stratotankers have been lost to accidents, involving 385 fatalities.

27 June 1958
USAF KC-135A, serial number 56-3599, stalled and crashed at Westover Air Force Base after the crew failed to extend the flaps on takeoff, killing all 15 on board. The aircraft was attempting a world speed record between New York and London.
31 March 1959
USAF KC-135A, 58-0002, entered a thunderstorm near Killeen, Texas. Two engines separated and one of the engines struck the tail, causing loss of control. The aircraft crashed on a hillside, killing all four crew on board. The aircraft had been delivered just six weeks before the accident.
15 October 1959
USAF KC-135A, 57-1513, collided in mid-air with B-52F 57-0036 at 32,000 feet (9,800 m) over Leitchfield, Kentucky, killing all six on board both aircraft.
3 February 1960
USAF KC-135A, 56-3628, crashed on takeoff in extremely gusty crosswind conditions at Roswell-Walker AFB, New Mexico. The airplane skidded into two other KC-135 tankers (57-1449 and 57–1457) and a hangar and burst into flames. The aircraft was on a training flight, but the instructor pilot was occupying the jump seat instead of one of the pilot seats as directed by the local commander. The destruction of three aircraft, along with the death of all six in the crew plus an additional two deaths on the ground made this a unique mishap.
18 November 1960
USAF KC-135A, 56-3605, crashed on landing at Loring Air Force Base due to an excessive sink rate, killing one of 17 on board.
9 May 1962
USAF KC-135A, 56-3618, crashed on takeoff from Loring Air Force Base due to engine failure, killing all six on board.
8 August 1962
USAF KC-135A, 55-3144, crashed on approach to Runway 11 at Hanscom Field in Bedford, Massachusetts, killing all three on board. Stock footage of this same aircraft had been used during the opening credits of the film Dr. Strangelove.
10 September 1962
USAF KC-135A, 60-0352 on a flight from Ellsworth Air Force Base to Fairchild Air Force Base crashed into a mountain just 20 miles (32 km) northeast of Spokane, Washington. The flight hit fog on approach to the air base and hit Mount Kit Carson, a 5,271 ft (1,607 m) mountain. The crash killed all four crew and 40 passengers on board.
27 February 1963
USAF KC-135A, 56-3597, crashed on takeoff at Eielson Air Force Base due to engine separation, killing all seven on board; two on the ground died when debris from the crash struck a guard house and nearby waiting room.
21 June 1963
USAF KC-135A-BN Stratotanker, 57-1498 out of Westover AFB crashed on approach during a training flight in a wooded area near Belchertown, Massachusetts. One of the four occupants was killed.
28 August 1963
USAF KC-135A, 61-0322, collided in mid-air with KC-135A 61-0319 300 miles (480 km) west of Bermuda, killing all 11 on board both aircraft.
8 July 1964
USAF KC-135A, 60-0340, collided in mid-air with F-105 Thunderchief 61-0091 during in-flight refueling over Death Valley, California, killing all five on board both aircraft.
4 January 1965
USAF KC-135A, 61-0265, crashed on climbout from Loring Air Force Base after two engines separated, killing all four on board.
16 January 1965
USAF KC-135A 57-1442, crashed after its rudder control system suffered a malfunction shortly after takeoff from McConnell Air Force Base, Kansas. The fuel-laden plane crashed in northeast Wichita at a street intersection and caused a considerable fire. A total of 30 were killed, including 23 on the ground and the seven member crew.
26 February 1965
USAF KC-135A, 63-8882, collided in mid-air with B-47E 52-0171 over the Atlantic Ocean, killing all eight on board both aircraft.
3 June 1965
USAF KC-135A, 63-8042, lost electrical power on takeoff and crashed at Walker Air Force Base, killing all five on board.
17 January 1966
A fatal collision occurred between a B-52G, 58-0256, and a KC-135A, 61-0273, flying out of Moron AB, Spain while flying over Palomares, Spain. The B-52G was on an Operation Chrome Dome mission, which required multiple air refuelings. The mishap caused both aircraft to break up in mid-air and killed all four crew members on the KC-135A and three of the seven on the B-52G, while causing radiological contamination, as nuclear weapons had to be recovered from on land and at sea, nearby.
19 May 1966
USAF KC-135A, 57-1444, of 4252nd Strategic Wing, crashed on takeoff from Kadena Air Base, killing all 11 on board as well as a motorist on nearby Highway 16. The aircraft was bound for Yokota Air Base to repair a KC-135 when it lifted off too soon during a heavy-weight takeoff.
19 January 1967
USAF KC-135A, 56-3613, crashed into Shadow Mountain, foothill of Mount Spokane (elevation 4,340 ft (1,320 m) MSL) while descending towards Fairchild Air Force Base, killing all nine on board.
17 January 1968
USAF KC-135A, 58-0026, stalled and crashed at Minot Air Force Base after the pilot overrotated the aircraft during takeoff in a snowstorm, killing all 13 on board including the 15th Air Force Vice Commander MGen Charles Eisenhart. This accident was instrumental in the decision to refit the KC-135 fleet with the Collins FD-109(V) integrated flight director system, in place of the earlier "round dial" cockpit layout.
30 July 1968
USAF KC-135A, 56-3655, crashed on Mount Lassen after the vertical stabilizer broke off after a sharp turn while practicing an emergency descent, killing all nine on board.
24 September 1968
USAF KC-135A, 55-3133, crashed on landing at Wake Island, Micronesia. Aircraft developed engine problems while en route from Andersen AFB, Guam to Hickam AFB, Hawaii and during landing at Wake Island the aircraft contacted the surface of the water and bounced onto the east end of the runway. There were 11 fatalities out 56 persons on board.
1 October 1968
USAF KC-135A, 55-3138, struck concrete and steel light poles on takeoff and crashed at U-Tapao Airport, Thailand after a loss of power in an engine and resultant loss of control, killing all four on board.
22 October 1968
USAF KC-135A, 61-0301, flew into a mountain while descending to Ching Chuan Kang Air Base, Taiwan, killing all six on board.
19 December 1969
USAF KC-135A, 56-3629, crashed into the sea on climbout from Ching Chuan Kang Air Base due to low-level windshear, killing all four on board.
3 June 1971
USAF KC-135Q, 58-0039, exploded in mid-air and crashed at Centenera, Spain, killing all five on board.
13 March 1972
KC-135A, 58-0048, crashed while landing at Carswell AFB. Its right wing struck the ground, which led to the airplane exploding and killing all 5 on board.
8 March 1973
USAF KC-135A, 63-7989, collided with KC-135 63-7980 on the ramp at Lockbourne Air Force Base and caught fire, killing two of five on board.
7 December 1975
USAF KC-135A, 60-0354, from Plattsburgh AFB, New York, crashed after takeoff at Eielson AFB, Alaska, killing all four crewmembers. Launch was delayed because of problems with the receiver aircraft. The KC-135 was required to sit at the end of the runway in extremely cold weather, without heat, with engines shut down. Repeated requests for a mobile heat source were denied by the command post. Landing gear failed to retract after takeoff. Crewmembers may have suffered from hypothermia.
6 February 1976
USAF KC-135A, 60-0368, flew into a mountain while descending to Torrejon Air Base, Spain, killing all seven on board. The aircraft was assigned to the 410th BMW/46th AREFS at K.I. Sawyer AFB, Michigan, but, as is often the case on Tanker Task Force deployed operations, the flight crew was from another SAC unit at Seymour-Johnson AFB, North Carolina. Only two aircraft crew chiefs on board were from K I Sawyer AFB, Michigan.
26 September 1976
USAF KC-135A, 61-0296, crashed while on approach to Wurtsmith Air Force Base, Michigan, killing 15 passengers and flight crew on board. The aircraft was flying a "First Team" mission taking 10 passengers to HQ-Strategic Air Command for briefings and orientation. The crew became distracted by a cabin pressurization problem after an intermediate stop and descended into a wooded area about 12 miles (19 km) southwest of Alpena, Michigan. There was one survivor, reportedly a crew chief who was in the boom operator aft station (boom pod) at the time of the crash.
29 April 1977
USAF KC-135A, 58-0101 from Castle AFB hit five or six cows while practicing night takeoffs and landings at Beale AFB. Takeoff was aborted and the plane overran the runway and caught on fire. Of the crew of 7, there were no fatalities. During that time cattle strayed through a broken fence from a nearby field and onto the runway.
19 September 1979
USAF KC-135A, 58-0127, from Castle AFB crashed on the runway during a simulated engine failure on a training flight, killing 15 of 20 occupants on board.
13 March 1982
Arizona ANG KC-135A, 57-1489 collided in mid-air with a civilian Grumman-American AA-1 Yankee near Luke AFB, Arizona. The collision, which occurred as the tanker was descending on an IFR flight plan through an undercast, was struck by the civilian aircraft operating VFR just below the cloud deck, causing the tail of the KC-135 to be severed by the force of the impact. The two civilians on the AA-1 and all four crew on the KC-135 were killed. Included among the dead was the squadron commander of the 197th AREFS, Lt Col James N. Floor.
19 March 1982
Illinois National Guard KC-135A, 58-0031, exploded in mid-air at 13,700 feet (4,200 m) and crashed at Greenwood, Illinois, due to a possible overheated fuel pump, killing all 27 on board.
19 March 1985
USAF 8th AF KC-135A 61-0316 caught fire during ground refueling at Cairo International Airport (CAI), Cairo, Egypt. The interior of the airplane was burned out and the aircraft was written off as damaged beyond repair although the wing structure was used in repairing KC-135A 58-0014 (which was later converted to a KC-135E). There were no injuries reported.
28 August 1985
USAF KC-135A 59-1443 was damaged beyond repair when a student pilot allowed an engine to contact the runway during a landing attempt at Beale Air Force Base near Marysville, California. During the go-around the instructor lost control of the aircraft while performing checklist items for an in-flight fire. All seven (three instructors and four students) aboard the aircraft died in the crash.
17 June 1986
USAF KC-135A,63-7983, crashed while en route to Howard AFB, Panama. It struck a hill south of the nearby Rodman Naval Station, killing all four crew members on board. The tanker and crew were based at Grissom Air Force Base, Indiana.
13 March 1987
USAF KC-135A, 60-0361, crashed at Fairchild Air Force Base after encountering wake turbulence from a B-52, while practicing a low-level refueling display. The aircraft rolled 80 degrees to the left, which stalled both left side engines (#1 and #2). The crew was able to recover to wings level, but were too low and impacted the ground in an open area of the base. The accident killed all six on board and one person on the ground.
11 October 1988
USAF KC-135A, 60-0317, crashed at Wurtsmith Force Base after a hard landing following a steep approach during crosswinds. The airplane went off the side of the runway and broke up. A fire erupted and killed all six crewmembers on board, while 10 passengers were able to jump to safety. Pilot error was determined as the cause of the accident.
20 November 1988
USAF KC-135 suffered a failure of a sighting window next to the sextant port in the cockpit during a trans-Atlantic flight. A boom operator died when he was sucked partway through the 10-inch by 8-inch window opening as the cockpit depressurized. None of the 17 others on board were injured.
31 January 1989
USAF KC-135A, 63-7990, crashed on takeoff from Dyess AFB, Texas after the water-injection system for the Pratt & Whitney J-57 engines failed and the remaining "dry" thrust was insufficient for flight at the takeoff gross weight. The mission was scheduled as a non-stop flight to Hickam AFB/Honolulu Hawaii with an en route F-16 air refueling mission. 7 crew members and 12 passengers, including military spouses, retired military members and one child, were killed. The aircraft and crew were based at K I Sawyer AFB, Michigan.
20 September 1989
USAF KC-135E, 57-1481, exploded on the ground at Eielson Air Force Base due to an overheated fuel pump, killing two of seven on board. The crew was shutting down the engines when the explosion occurred.
4 October 1989
KC-135A, 56-3592, from en route from Loring Air Force Base crashed into a hill along the west side of Trans-Canada Highway 2 at Carlingford, New Brunswick due to an overheated fuel pump, killing all four crew members. After five accidents involving fuel pump overheating, crews were to keep 3,000 pounds (1,400 kg) of fuel in the tank.
11 January 1990
KC-135E, 59-1494, caught fire on the tarmac at Pease Air National Guard Base during maintenance work; there were no injuries, however the aircraft was destroyed.
6 February 1991
KC-135E, 58-0013, suffered an accident over Saudi Arabia after entering severe wake turbulence from a passing KC-135. The aircraft lost both engines from under the left wing, but the crew was able to recover and land successfully. The aircraft was repaired and later returned to service. The entire crew received the Distinguished Flying Cross for their actions.
10 December 1993
Wisconsin Air National Guard KC-135R, 57-1470, exploded while undergoing routine ground maintenance at General Mitchell Air National Guard Base due to an overheated fuel pump. Six NCO maintenance personnel were killed.
13 January 1999
Washington Air National Guard KC-135E, 59-1452, crashed on approach in Geilenkirchen, Germany due to the horizontal stabilizer being in a 7.5 nose-up trim condition, killing all four crew members.
7 April 1999
Air National Guard KC-135R, 57-1418, was damaged beyond repair while undergoing a cabin pressurization check while in depot maintenance at the Oklahoma City Air Logistics Center at Tinker AFB, Oklahoma. During a previous maintenance event, the pressure relief valves were secured shut and not released afterwards. This created a catastrophic explosion that nearly separated the empennage from the aircraft and destroyed the aft fuselage section. No personnel were injured or killed during the mishap, but the aircraft was a total loss.
26 September 2006
USAF KC-135R, 63-8886, was damaged beyond economical repair when it was struck by a Tupolev Tu-154 of Altyn Air, EX-85718, while stopped on a taxiway after landing at Manas Air Base. As the Tu-154 took off, its right wing struck the fairing of the KC-135R's No. 1 engine. The force of the impact nearly severed the No. 1 engine and destroyed a portion of the left wing. The resulting fire caused extensive damage to the KC-135. The Tu-154 lost about 6 feet (1.8 m) of its right wingtip, but was able to get airborne and return to the airport for an emergency landing. The tanker crew had been directed to use a taxiway which was not usable for night operations and the controller failed to note that they reported "holding short" of that taxiway, rather than "clear of" that point. The crew of the KC-135 evacuated the aircraft without serious injuries.
3 May 2013
USAF KC-135R, 63-8877, broke up in flight about eight minutes after taking off from Manas Air base in Kyrgyzstan, killing all three crew members. After investigation, it was determined that a rudder power control unit malfunction led to a Dutch roll oscillatory instability. Not recognizing the Dutch roll, the crew used the rudder to stay on course, which exacerbated the instability, leading to an unrecoverable flight condition. The over-stressed tail section detached and the aircraft broke apart soon after. The aircraft was at cruise altitude about 200 km west of Bishkek before it crashed in a mountainous area near the village of Chorgolu, close to the border between Kyrgyzstan and Kazakhstan.
12 March 2026
Two USAF KC-135Rs, believed to be 63-8017 and 60-0347, were involved in an apparent mid-air collision over western Iraq in friendly airspace during the 2026 Iran war; U.S. Central Command confirmed that one aircraft had crashed. 63-8017 made an emergency landing at Ben Gurion International Airport in Tel Aviv, having sustained damage to the top portion of its vertical stabilizer. Officials stated the incident was not caused by hostile or friendly fire. On 13 March 2026 U.S. Central Command announced that all six crew members on board 60-0347 were confirmed deceased.

== Aircraft on display ==
- 55-3118 The City of Renton – KC-135A on static display at the entrance to McConnell Air Force Base, Kansas. It was the first aircraft built and was used in a variety of test roles. It was later converted to an EC-135K airborne command post, and restored to a tanker configuration for display.
- 55-3130 Old Grandad – KC-135A on static display at the March Field Air Museum, March ARB, California.
- 55-3139 City of Atwater – KC-135A on static display at the Castle Air Museum at the former Castle AFB, California.
- 56-3595 – KC-135A on static display at the Barksdale Global Power Museum at Barksdale Air Force Base, Louisiana.
- 56-3611 – KC-135E on static display Scott Field Heritage Air Park at Scott Air Force Base, Illinois.
- 56-3639 – KC-135A on static display at the Linear Air Park at Dyess Air Force Base, Texas.
- 56-3658 Iron Eagle – KC-135E on static display at the Kansas Aviation Museum.
- 57-1429 – KC-135E on static display at the Museum of the Kansas National Guard at Forbes Field Air National Guard Base in Topeka, Kansas.
- 57-1455 – KC-135E on static display at Pease Air National Guard Base, New Hampshire.
- 57-1458 – KC-135E on static display at Eielson Air Force Base, Alaska.
- 57-1495 – KC-135E in storage at Lincoln Air National Guard Base, Nebraska.
- 57-1507 – KC-135E on static display at the Air Mobility Command Museum at Dover Air Force Base, Delaware.
- 57-1510 Never Forget – KC-135E on static display at the Hill Aerospace Museum at Hill Air Force Base, Utah.
- 58-0070 – KC-135A on static display at the Wings of Freedom Park at Altus Air Force Base, Oklahoma.
- 59-1481 – KC-135A on static display at Ellington Field Joint Reserve Base, Texas. It was operated by NASA as N930NA and one of two KC-135s used for zero-gravity and other research purposes.
- 59-1487 – KC-135E on static display at the 126th Air Refueling Wing / Illinois Air National Guard complex at Scott Air Force Base.
- 59-1497 – KC-135E on static display at Joint Base McGuire-Dix-Lakehurst, New Jersey
- 60-0329 – KC-135R at the National Museum of the United States Air Force in Dayton, Ohio, on display in the Air Park.
- 63-7998 – KC-135A on static display at the Pima Air & Space Museum, adjacent to Davis-Monthan AFB, Arizona. It was operated by NASA as N931NA and is the second of their two research aircraft.
- 63-8005 – KC-135A on static display at Grand Forks AFB, North Dakota

== Specifications (KC-135R) ==
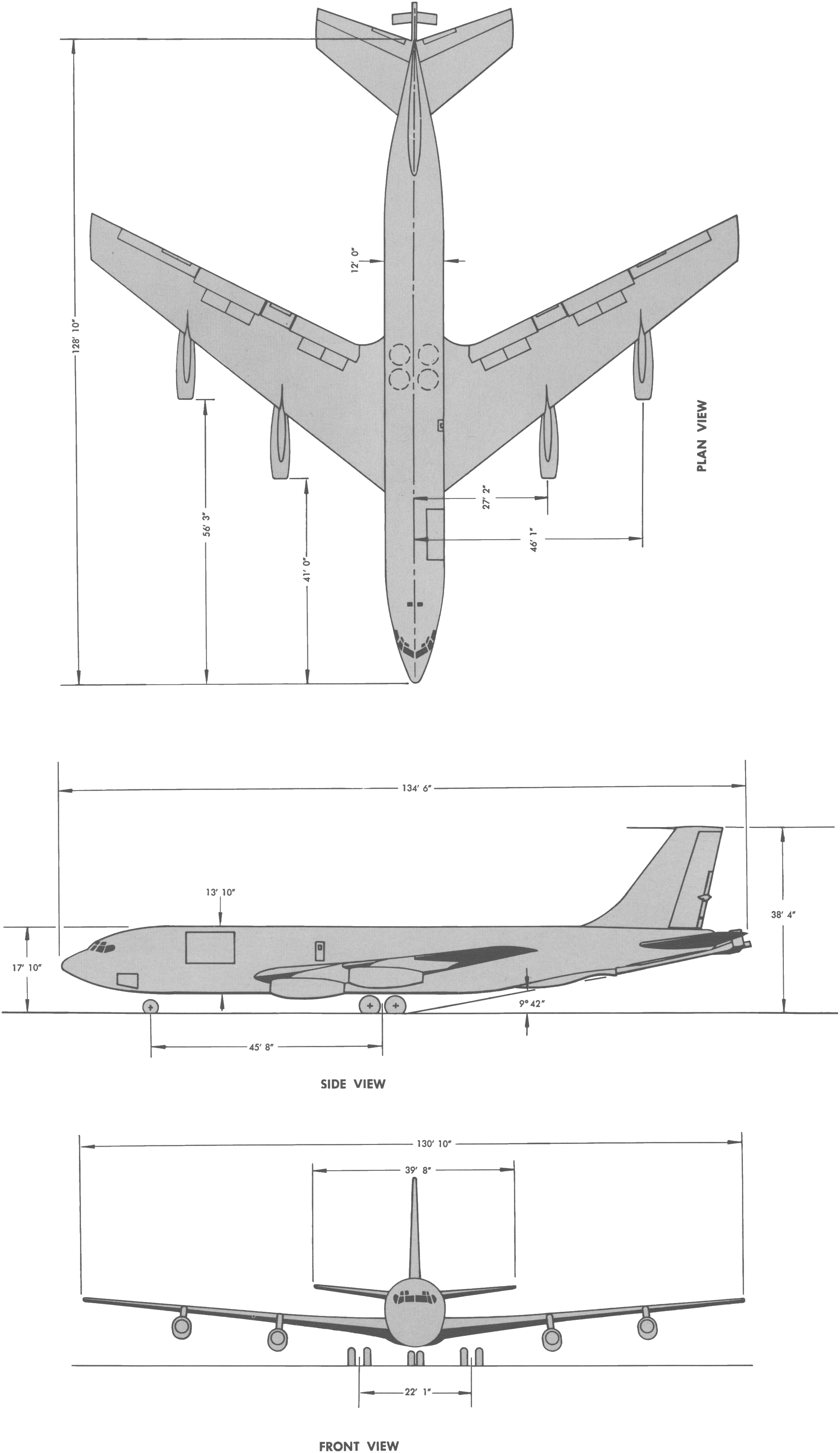
3-view silhouette drawing of the Boeing KC-135A Stratotanker

Data from USAF Fact Sheet, Boeing.com : KC-135

General characteristics

- Crew: 3 (pilot, co-pilot and boom operator; some KC-135 missions require the addition of a navigator.)
- Capacity: up to 80 passengers / 83,000 lb (38,000 kg) or 6 463L pallets
- Length: 136 ft 3 in (41.53 m)
- Wingspan: 130 ft 10 in (39.88 m)
- Height: 41 ft 8 in (12.70 m)
- Wing area: 2,433 sq ft (226.0 m^{2})
- Airfoil: root: BAC 310/311/312; tip: BAC 313
- Empty weight: 98,392 lb (44,630 kg)
- Operating empty weight: 124,000 lb (56,245 kg)
- Gross weight: 297,000 lb (134,717 kg)
- Max takeoff weight: 322,500 lb (146,284 kg)
- Fuel capacity: 200,000 lb (90,718 kg) / 29,850 US gal (112,995 L; 24,855 imp gal)
- Powerplant: 4 × CFM International F108-CF-100 turbofan engines, 21,600 lbf (96.2 kN) thrust each

Performance

- Maximum speed: 504 kn (580 mph, 933 km/h)
- Maximum speed: Mach 0.9
- Cruise speed: 460 kn (530 mph, 850 km/h) at 30,000 ft (9,100 m)
- Range: 1,300 nmi (1,500 mi, 2,400 km) with 150,000 lb (68,039 kg) of transferable fuel
- Ferry range: 9,572 nmi (11,015 mi, 17,727 km)
- Service ceiling: 50,000 ft (15,000 m)
- Rate of climb: 4,900 ft/min (25 m/s)

== See also ==
- Vomit Comet – Aircraft used to create brief weightlessness
- 1966 Palomares B-52 crash – Collision between a USAF B-52G and KC-135 over the Mediterranean Sea near Spain

Related development

- Boeing 367-80 – 1954 American quadjet prototype aircraft
- Boeing C-135 Stratolifter – Military transport aircraft by Boeing
- Boeing C-137 Stratoliner – VIP transport aircraft derived from the Boeing 707
- Boeing 707 – Four-engined single-aisle airliner family
- KC-130 – Aerial refueling tanker based on Lockheed Martin C-130

Aircraft of comparable role, configuration, and era

- Ilyushin Il-78 – Soviet/Russian aerial refueling tanker
- Lockheed L-193 – Aircraft development
- Vickers VC10 – British four-engined narrow-body jet airliner

Related lists

- List of tanker aircraft
- List of United States military aerial refueling aircraft
- List of military electronics of the United States

== Bibliography ==
- Hopkins, III, Robert S. (1997). Boeing KC-135 Stratotanker: More Than Just a Tanker. Leicester, England: Midland Publishing. ISBN 1-85780-069-9.
- Pither, Tony (1998). The Boeing 707 720 and C-135. Tunbridge Wells, England: Air-Britain (Historians) Ltd. ISBN 0-85130-236-X.
