= Boom operator (military) =

Tanker aircrew responsible for aerial refueling

USAF Boom Operator
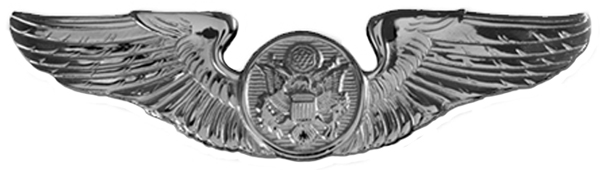
- Enlisted Aircrew Badge
- Active: September 16, 1948 – present (77 years, 8 months)
- Country: United States of America
- Branch: United States Air Force
- Type: In-flight refueling specialist
- Role: Aerial refueling (U.S. & allies); Airlift (cargo & personnel); Special operations Nuclear operations
- Size: 765 (90% male, 10% female)
- Garrison/HQ: List of Air Refueling Squadrons
- Nicknames: "Boom", "Boomer"
- Motto: "Nobody Kicks ASS Without Tanker Gas!" (NKAWTG)
- Engagements: Korean War; Vietnam War; Gulf War; Iraqi no-fly zones; Bosnian War; Kosovo War; War on terror • War in Afghanistan • Iraq War • Military intervention in Libya • Northern Mali conflict • Military intervention against ISIL

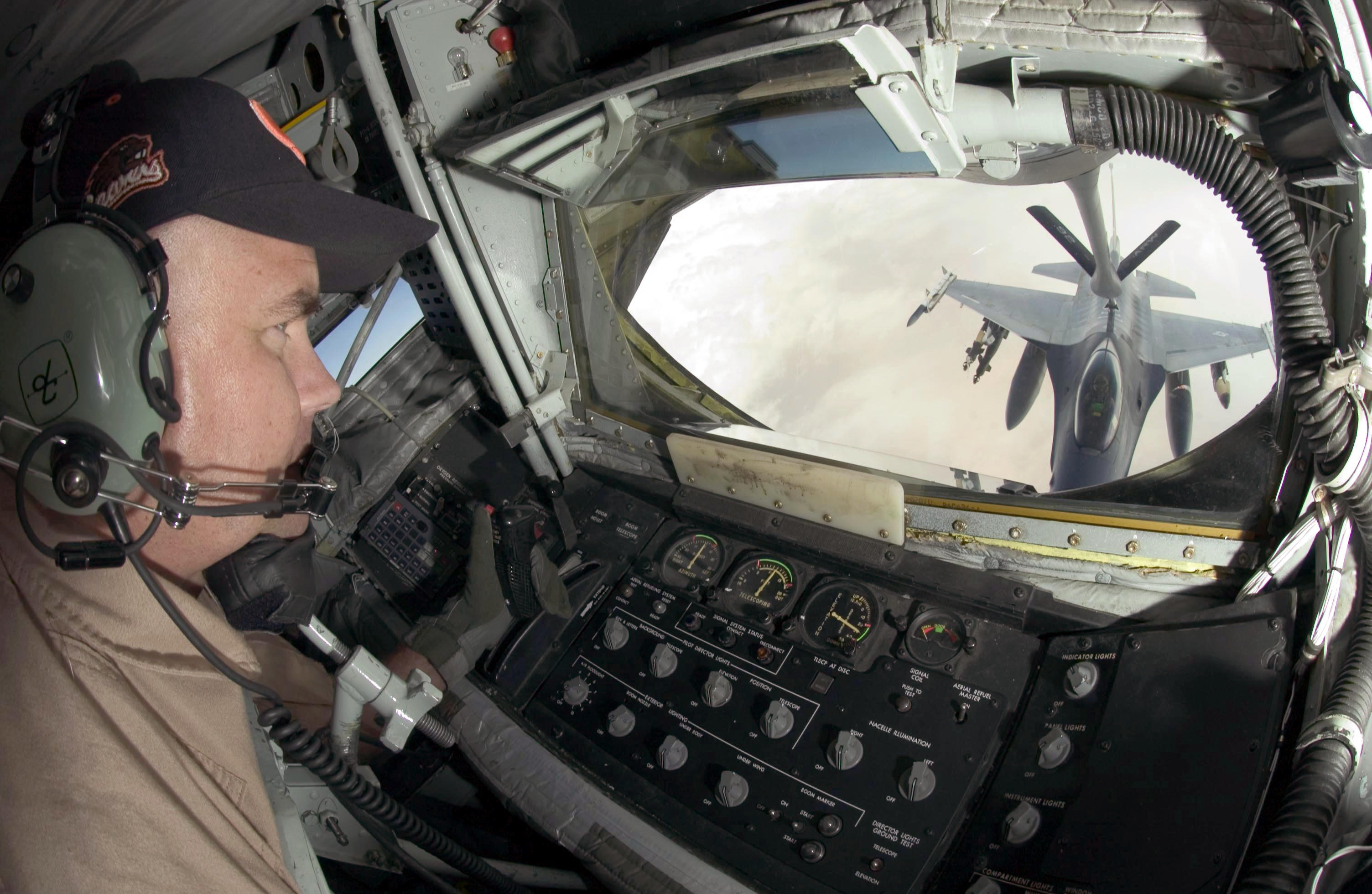
A USAF KC-135 boom operator refuels a USAF F-16 during a mission over Iraq.

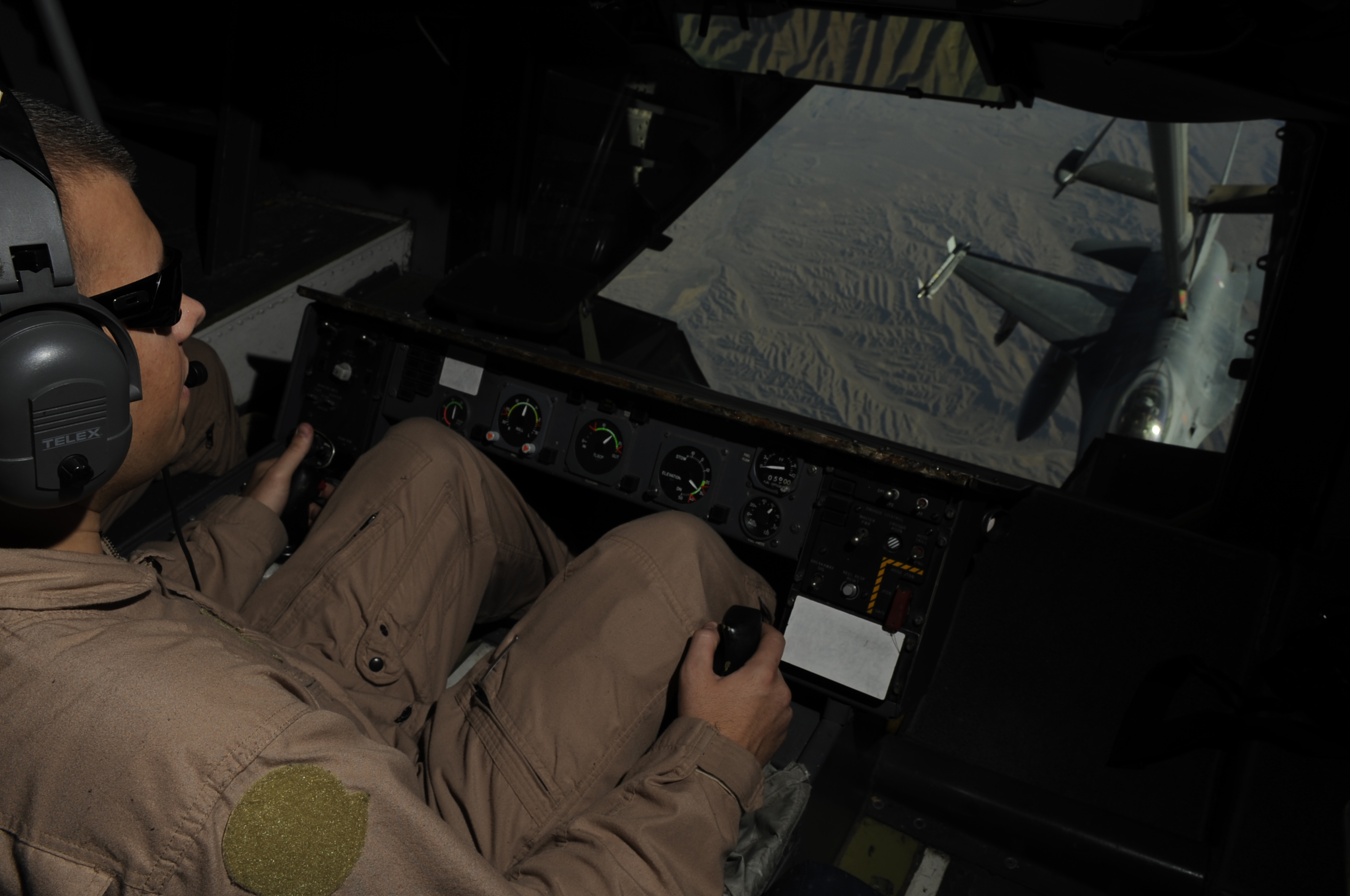
A USAF KC-10 boom operator refuels a Dutch F-16 during a mission over Afghanistan.

In the U.S. Air Force (USAF), a boom operator is an aircrew member aboard tanker aircraft who is responsible for safely and effectively transferring aviation fuel from one military aircraft to another during flight (known as aerial refueling, air refueling, in-flight refueling, air-to-air refueling, and tanking). The name boom operator implies that one "operates a boom" (the flying boom), which is a long, extendable metal arm attached to the rear underside of the tanker that the boom operator connects to the fuel receptacle of a receiving aircraft (the receiver). The boom operator also controls the refueling drogue, a basket attached to a flexible hose that trails the tanker, when using the probe-and-drogue system. The USAF officially designates the boom operator career field as "In-Flight Refueling" with a specialty code of 1A0X1. However, this designation is usually reserved for administrative paperwork such as enlistment contracts and performance reports, as boom operators themselves are rarely referred to as in-flight refueling specialists within the USAF. The title "Boom Operator" is most commonly used, in reference to the aircrew position they occupy on the airplane, as noted in USAF regulations and aircraft flight manuals. Fellow crew members affectionately address them as "boom" or "boomer" (though the use of the term "boom" in this article refers to the flying boom, not the boom operator).

The boom operator crew position was created in 1948 when Boeing developed the flying boom at the request of the USAF. Prior to this, when the only practical means of transferring fuel was through a hose, other crew members fulfilled the duty of operating the air refueling equipment, such as the hose reel operator in the DH-4B and C-1 and the line operator in the B-24D and KB-29M using the grappled-line looped hose system. In the modern U.S. military, the boom operator crew position only exists in USAF tankers equipped with a flying boom, such as the KC-135, KC-10, and the newly developed KC-46. For tanker aircraft not equipped with a flying boom, such as the KC-130, HC-130, and F/A-18E/F, the specific crew member(s) responsible for operating the air refueling equipment and supervising refueling operations varies by aircraft. Boom-equipped tankers have been obtained by several foreign countries as a result of USAF tanker procurement programs and U.S. foreign military sales. An estimated 63 boom-equipped tankers (KC-135, KC-10, A330 MRTT, KC-767, and KC-33) are operated by 14 foreign countries; in comparison, the USAF operates 457 KC-135 and KC-10 tankers.

== Requirements ==
A boom operator must have a high school diploma or GED with 15 college credits. They must have normal depth perception, cannot be shorter than 64 inches (160 cm) or taller than 77 inches (200 cm), must complete a Single Scope Background Investigation, and complete seven and a half weeks of basic military training, and Airmen's week, and must be between the age of 17 and 39.

== Training ==
All boom operators first receive a month of training in flying tankers at Joint Base San Antonio, Texas. After this they spend three weeks in survival training. The boom operators of Boeing KC-135 Stratotankers are trained at Altus Air Force Base for four months.

== Equipment ==
Boom operators are used in McDonnell Douglas KC-10 Extenders and Boeing KC-135 Stratotankers. The Boeing KC-46 Pegasus is currently being deployed for use in refueling. The KC-10 station is in a rear-facing seat while the KC-135 is in a prone position. The KC-46 seats two operators in the front of the aircraft with 3D viewing screens fed by cameras. The future training program for the KC-46 for a boom operator is to be 59 days long, and the training time for a pilot is to be 82 days long.

== Aircraft ==
This section refers to operational tankers crewed by USAF boom operators since the development of the flying boom in 1948. For a complete list of U.S. military tankers, see List of United States military aerial refueling aircraft.

=== In service ===
Image	Tanker	Operational	Attributes
A KC-135 refuels a flight of F-16 Fighting Falcons over the Baltics.	Boeing KC-135 Stratotanker	1957–present	First jet-powered refueling tanker.; Equipped with the flying boom.; Initially developed for use by Strategic Air Command (SAC) to refuel long-range, jet-powered strategic bombers, specifically the Boeing B-52 Stratofortress.; Development of the attachable boom-drogue adapter in 1959 made it possible to refuel probe-equipped airplanes while losing boom refueling capability.; Role was expanded extensively during the Vietnam War to refuel tactical fighter aircraft in addition to bombers.; After the war, role expanded further to refuel nearly all types of U.S. and allied airplanes.; Since the 1990s, 20 have been converted to multiple refueling system tankers (flying boom and probe-and-drogue systems) and 8 have been converted to receiver-capable tankers (able to be refueled as the receiver aircraft).; 803 built between 1955 and 1965; 398 in service as of May 2017 (156 in active duty squadrons, 70 in Air Force Reserve squadrons, and 172 in Air National Guard squadrons).
A KC-10 refuels two F-16s and an F-15 Eagle.	McDonnell Douglas KC-10 Extender	1981–present	First multiple refueling system tanker and first receiver-capable tanker.; Developed to supplement KC-135 tankers to help meet the global commitments of the U.S. military, including air refueling and airlift.; 60 built between 1979 and 1987; 59 in service as of May 2014, all in active duty squadrons (though the use of some are shared with 5 associate Air Force Reserve squadrons).
A KC-46 refuels a C-17 Globemaster during a test flight.	Boeing KC-46 Pegasus	2019–present	Multiple refueling system tanker.; Receiver-capable tanker.; First tanker with infrared countermeasures and electronic warfare capabilities.; Developed to replace aging fleet of KC-135 tankers.; USAF received 70+ aircraft.; USAF plans to purchase 179 tankers by 2028.

=== Retired ===
Image	Tanker	Operational	Attributes
A KB-29P refuels a B-45 Tornado.	Boeing KB-29 Superfortress	1948–1957	First operational refueling tanker.; Converted from B-29 Superfortress bombers. The B-29 tail gunner's turret was converted into the boom operator's station (boom pod).; Developed for use by SAC to refuel strategic bombers.; The KB-29M, introduced in 1948, initially utilized the British grappled-line looped hose system and converted to the British probe-and-drogue system in 1950.; The KB-29P, introduced in 1950, was the first tanker to be equipped with the flying boom. The boom was developed by Boeing in 1948 and had undergone flight tests for two years.; 208 B-29s were converted to KB-29s (92 KB-29Ms and 116 KB-29Ps) between 1948 and 1951.
A KB-50 refuels a flight of F-100 Super Sabres.	Boeing KB-50 Superfortress	1956–1965	Converted from B-50 Superfortress bombers. The B-50 was a variant of the B-29.; Developed for use by Tactical Air Command (TAC) to replace KB-29Ms to refuel tactical jet fighters using the probe-and-drogue system.; Though the KB-50 was not equipped with the flying boom, boom operators were used to operate the probe-and-drogue system.; 136 B-50s were converted to KB-50s (112 KB-50Js and 24 KB-50Ks) in the mid to late 1950s.
A KC-97 refuels a B-47 Stratojet.	Boeing KC-97 Stratofreighter	1951–1978	First purpose-built refueling tanker (previous tankers were converted from other airframes).; Equipped with the flying boom.; Developed for use by SAC as a faster alternative to KB-29Ps to refuel strategic bombers.; 811 built between 1951 and 1956.

== Gallery ==
The boom pod in a USAF KC-135. The boom operator lies in a prone position while refueling.

The boom pod in a USAF KC-10. The boom operator is seated while refueling.

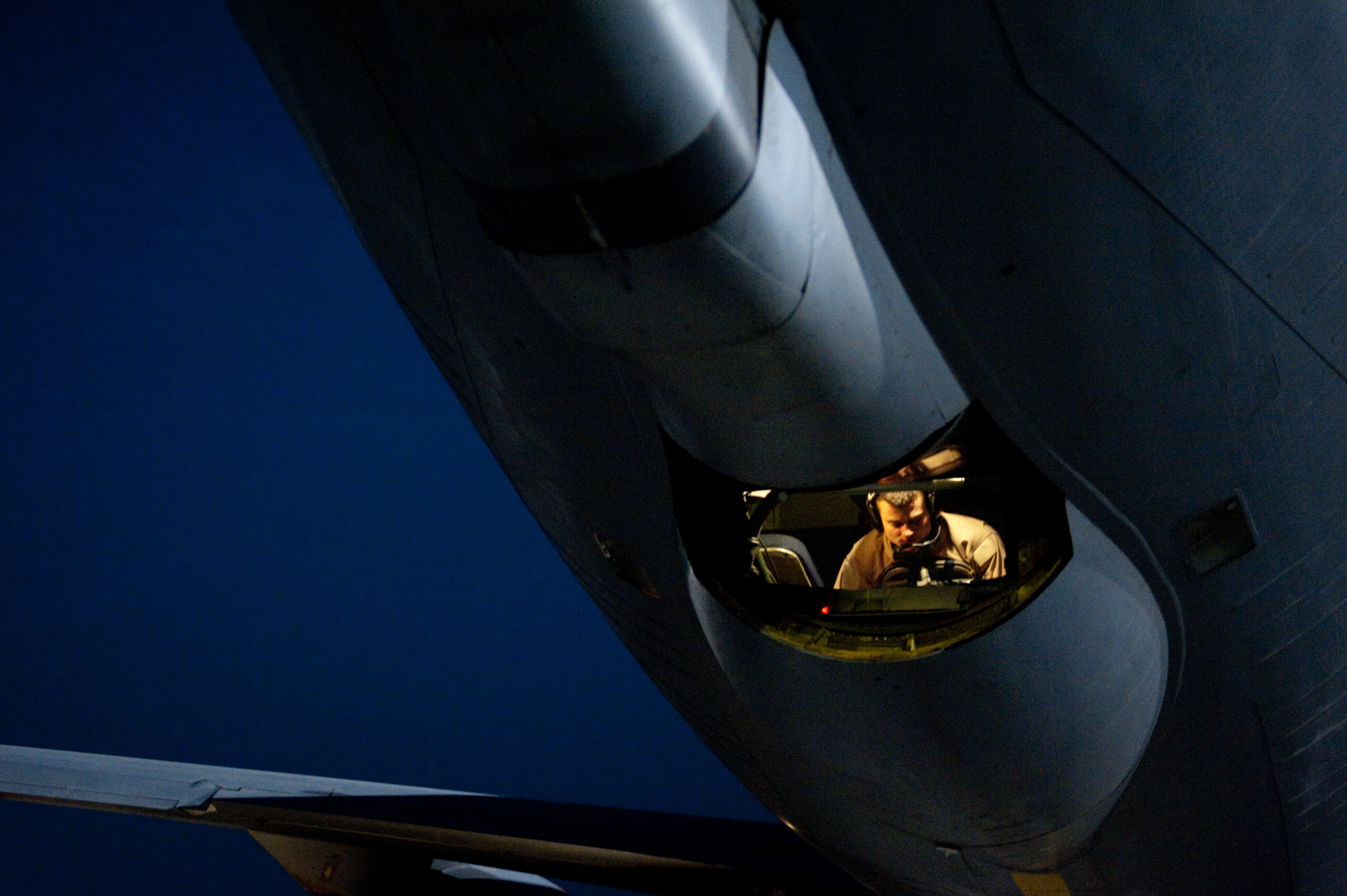
A boom operator in a USAF KC-135 conducts a preflight inspection in the boom pod prior to a mission in the Middle East.

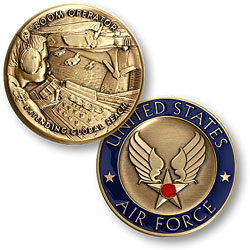
The challenge coin for a boom operator.

== See also ==
- Aircrew (Flight crew)
