= List of United States military aerial refueling aircraft =

The following is a list of United States military aerial refueling aircraft

== Active ==
- HC-130
- KC-130
- KC-135
- F/A-18E/F
- KC-46

== Planned ==
- MQ-25

== Retired ==
- KA-3
- KA-6D
- KB-29
- KB-50
- KC-97
- S-3
- KC-10

== Canceled ==
- KC-33
- KC-45
- L-193

== See also ==
- List of tanker aircraft
