= Lockheed L-193 Constellation II =

Aircraft development

L-193 Constellation II

General information
- Type: Jet airliner Aerial refuelling tanker
- National origin: United States
- Manufacturer: Lockheed
- Status: Canceled
- Number built: 0

The Lockheed L-193 Constellation II was a jet airliner design concept, designed between 1949 and 1953 with a swept wing and engines mounted towards the tail. An airliner and tanker version were developed. The latter, in an aerial refueling competition initiated by the United States Air Force (USAF), won and was preferred over the Boeing KC-135 Stratotanker. Since the competing Boeing aircraft was ready to fly first, examples were ordered as an interim measure. They performed well enough that the L-193 was never ordered as a tanker, and airliner plans were dropped soon after.

== Design and development ==
The Lockheed L-193 jet was designed between 1949 and 1953. By comparison, Boeing started producing the prototype for the Boeing 707 after the design was completed in 1952. Lockheed sought input from Trans World Airlines for the airliner's requirements and several sub-variants were developed. It was a swept wing with the engines mounted towards the tail. The same arrangement was later used by the Lockheed JetStar (1957), Vickers VC-10 (1962), and Ilyushin Il-62 (1963). It was designed to be slightly smaller than the Boeing 707 and Douglas DC-8 of the time. Lockheed used features seen in its previous designs, including tip tanks similar to the Lockheed Constellation and a double-deck fuselage similar to the Lockheed Constitution. The engines were also flush mounted to the fuselage, a feature dropped from most current jet designs.

In the wake of the Korean War, a competition was held in 1954 for a USAF aerial refueling tanker. A modified L-193 was chosen in 1955 to supplement the interim KC-135 tanker. The aircraft was designated "KCX-LO", and the first prototype would have been the XK-1. A prototype was ordered in February 1955. Air Force Secretary Harold E. Talbott ordered 250 KC-135 interim tankers while the selection winner was manufactured. The KC-135 was able to be delivered two years earlier than the Lockheed, and was able to be put into squadron service four years earlier. The orders for the Lockheed tanker were eventually dropped so the USAF would not have to support two separate tanker designs.

Lockheed never produced its jet airliner, instead producing the modestly-successful turboprop-powered Electra. Lockheed also produced the C-141 Starlifter jet cargo transport and an SST design, but did not produce a jet airliner until the L-1011 wide-body trijet. By contrast, Boeing had beat Lockheed by producing its prototype first, at its own expense, rather than waiting for the military contract, and would eventually dominate the market with a family of airliners based on the 707 and KC-135.

== Specifications (L-193) ==
Data from

General characteristics

- Crew: 5
- Capacity: 48–64
- Length: 112 ft 2 in (34.19 m)
- Wingspan: 104 ft (32 m)
- Height: 36 ft 8 in (11.18 m)
- Wing area: 1,615 sq ft (150.0 m^{2})
- Gross weight: 148,000 lb (67,132 kg)

Performance

- Maximum speed: 537 kn (618 mph, 995 km/h)
- Cruise speed: 520 kn (600 mph, 970 km/h)
- Range: 500 to 2,500 nmi (580 to 2,880 mi, 930 to 4,630 km) (depending on configuration)
- Rate of climb: 5,500 ft/min (28 m/s)
