= Next Generation Air-refueling System =

United States Air Force aerial refueling aircraft program

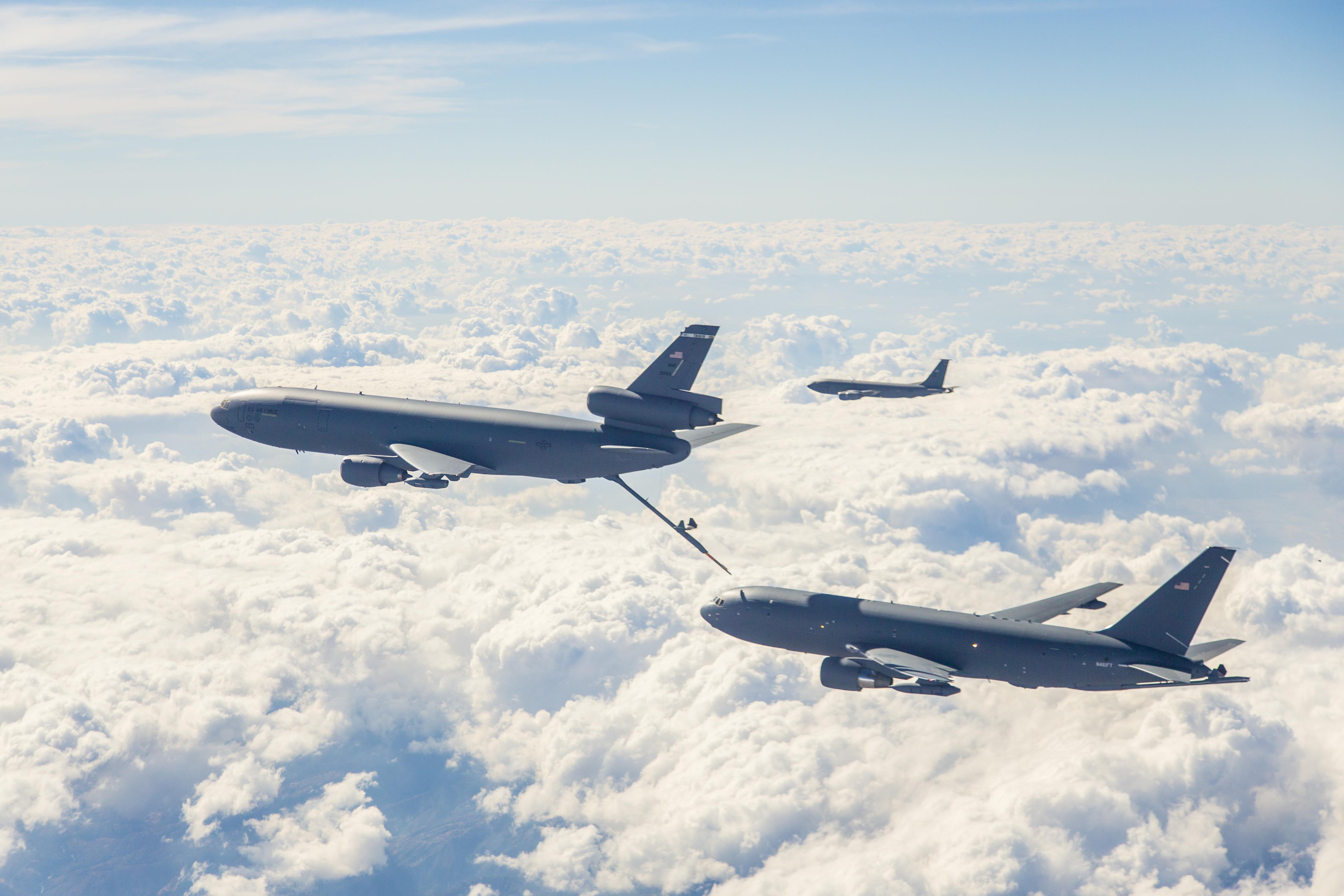
The KC-10 refueling a KC-46, with a KC-135 flying in the background.

The Next Generation Air-refueling System (NGAS), also known as KC-Z, is a United States Air Force program to procure a new aerial refueling tanker aircraft. It is the third increment in a three increment tanker recapitalization plan to replace the Air Force's current aerial refueling aircraft.

== Background ==
The NGAS is the third step in the three step plan to replace the various aerial refueling tanker aircraft operated by the United States Air Force. The first two increments were the KC-X program, which selected the Boeing KC-46 Pegasus to replace the Boeing KC-135 Stratotanker, and the KC-Y program. The vision for the outcome of the procurement plan is traditional tanker aircraft for the bulk of aerial refueling in addition to tanker aircraft that can operate and survive in the same non-permissible airspace as the fighter aircraft it would be supporting. The NGAS is intended to fill the second role.

General Mike Minihan, commander of the Air Mobility Command, has expressed his desire for expanded roles for the NGAS, including drone launch and command and control.

== Proposals ==
On January 31, 2023, the Department of Defense released a request for information (RFI) related to the NGAS program. The RFI states the aircraft will be operational by 2040. It also states the NGAS will be required to operated in "contested scenarios" and requests "innovative solutions in all size and performance classes that might address the stressing mission requirements". Finally, it requires the aircraft to be capable of "airspeeds [...] compatible with modern receivers".

In May 2024, Lockheed Martin's Skunk Works division released a conceptual render of a possible crewed stealthy flying wing NGAS design. In November of the same year, they released a second conceptual render of a more conventionally designed stealthy optionally-crewed design with two wing-mounted booms.
