= List of tanker aircraft =

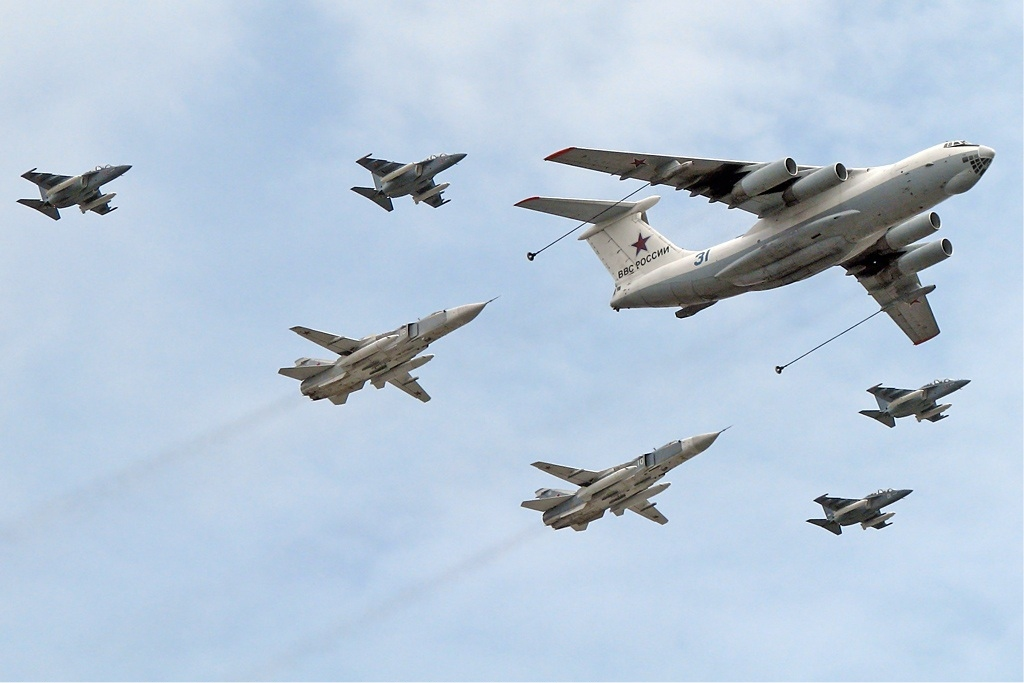
A Russian Air Force (VVS) Ilyushin Il-78 tanker aircraft with its two hose and drogue refuelling devices extended is followed by two Sukhoi Su-24 attack jet aircraft simulating aerial refuelling, flanked by four smaller Yakovlev Yak-130 trainer/fighter aircraft, from the celebration flypast during the Moscow Victory Day Parade of 2010.

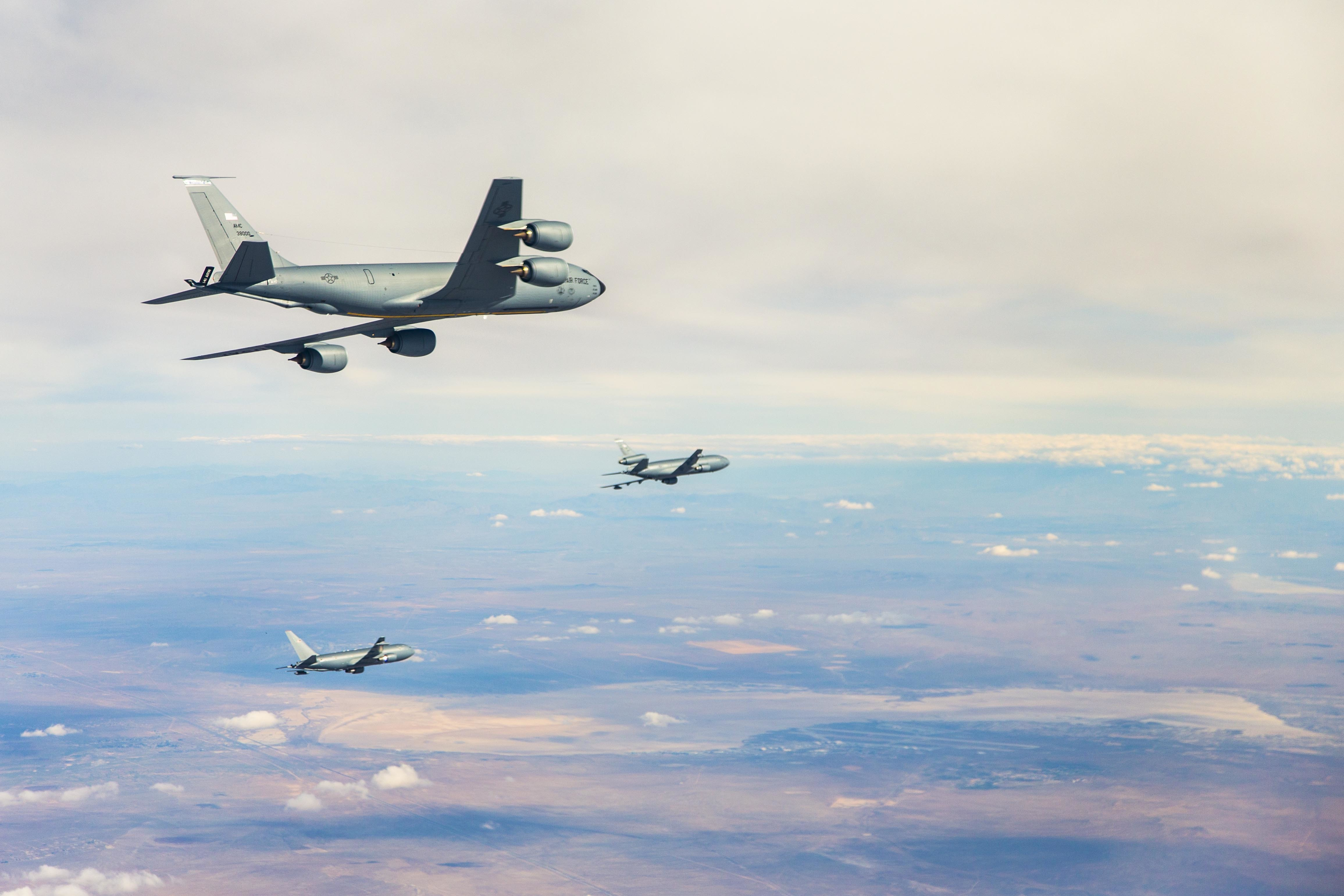
KC-135, KC-10, and KC-46 of the United States Air Force. All three of them support flying boom refueling.

This is a list of tanker aircraft used for aerial refuelling of another aircraft while in powered flight.

== Refueling methods ==
Looped hose
The first commercial method employed a hose which was held slack in a trailing half-loop behind both aircraft. The receiving aircraft flew just below the tanker and deployed a steel line, which the tanker caught with its own grappling line and drew in. The tanker then connected the first steel line to the refueling hose and paid it out as the receiving aircraft reeled it back in.
Probe-and-drogue
The tanker trails a flexible hose with a stabilising drogue on the end and the receiving aircraft manoeuvers to insert a short probe into the receptacle in the drogue.
Flying boom
The tanker extends a hinged telescopic boom with aerodynamic control surfaces on its end. An operator "flies" it to match up with a receptacle on the receiving aircraft, which then moves forwards to make the connection.
Wing-to-wing
A hybrid method in which the tanker trails a flexible hose from a wing and the receiving aircraft catches it in a hooked receptacle under one of its own wings.
Buddy refueling
An aircraft type is fitted with both supply and receiving hardware, so that one aircraft can refuel another of the same type.

=== Gallery ===
These images illustrate various aerial refuelling methods.

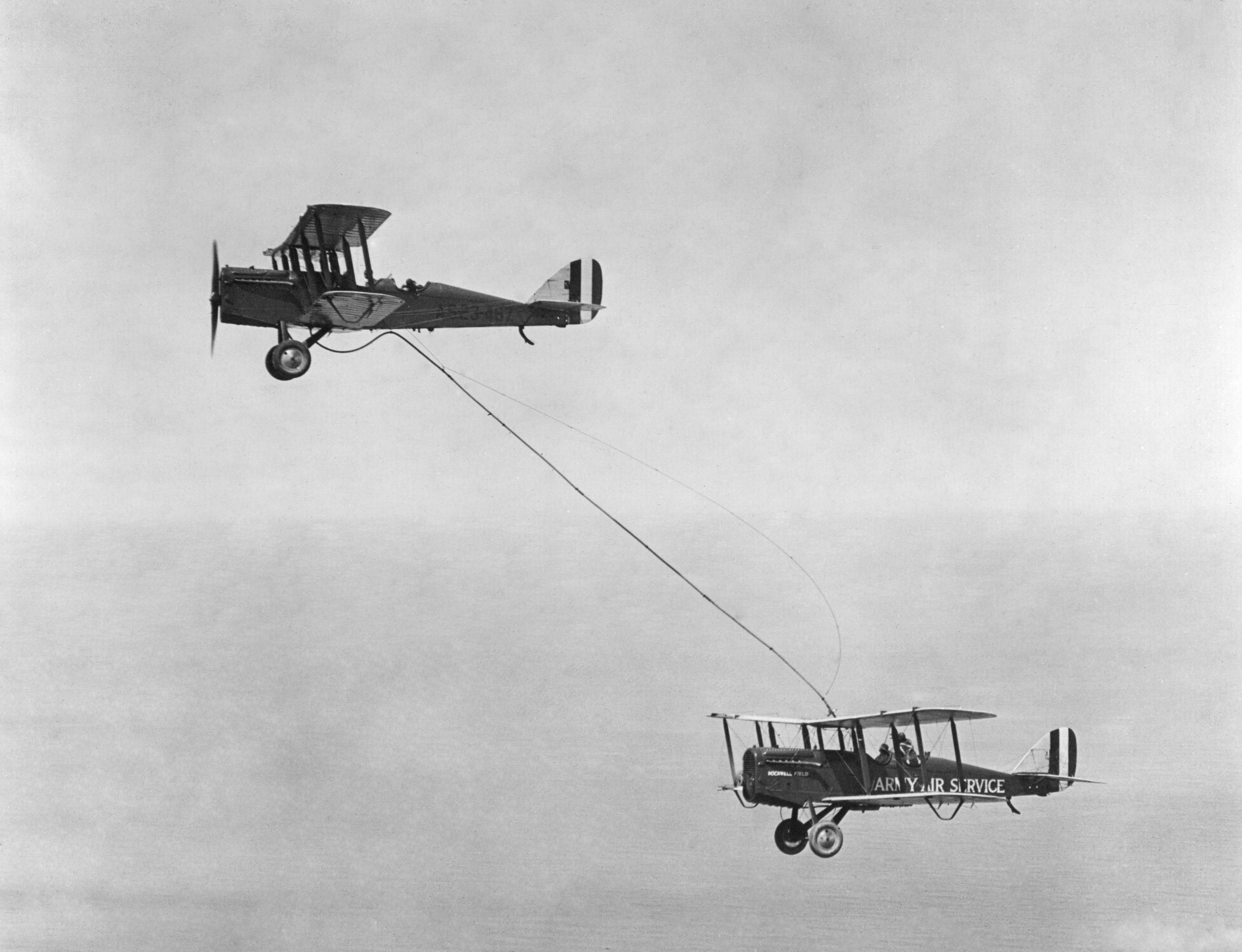
First successful mid-air refuelling in 1923.

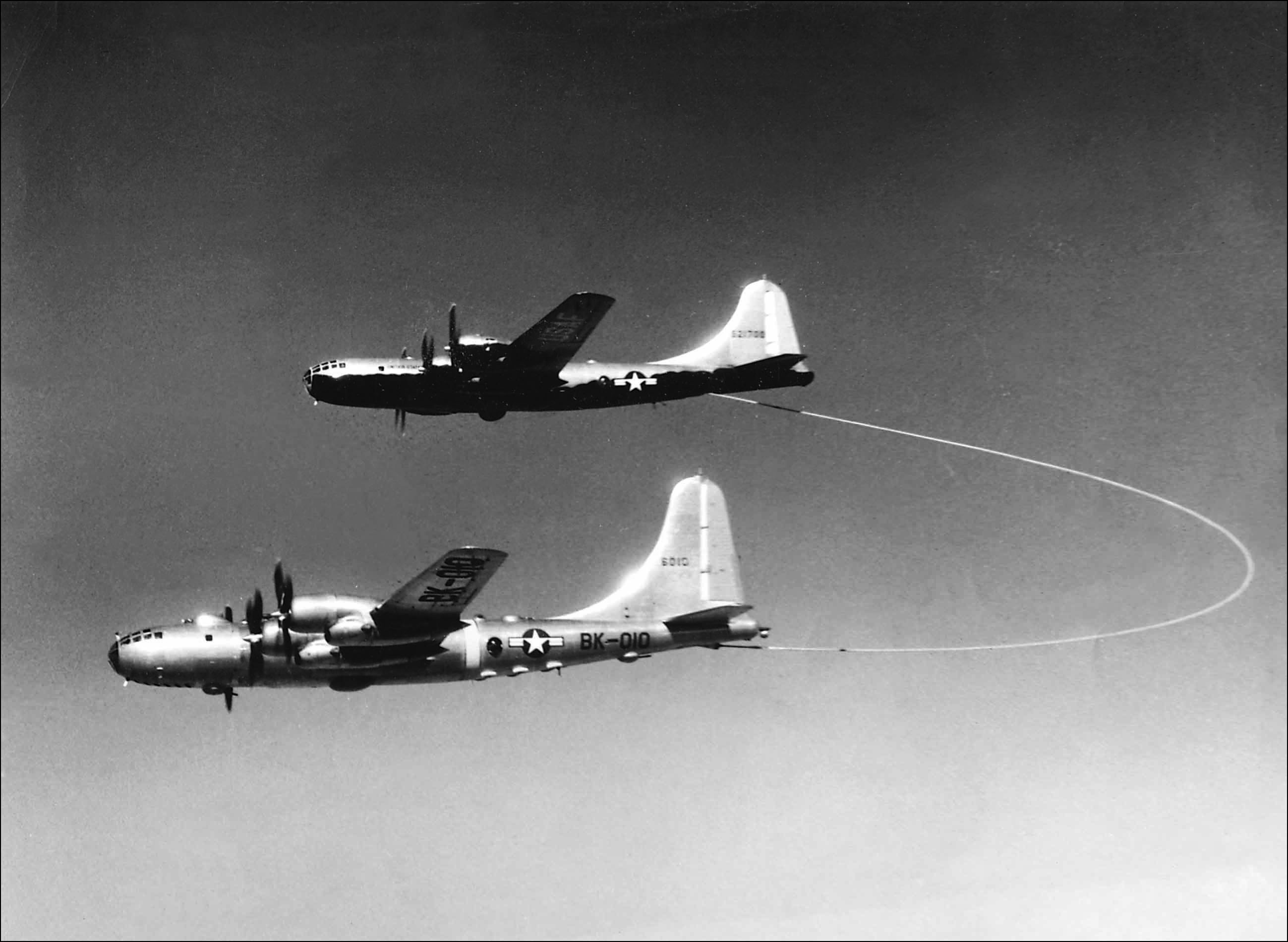
Looped hose refuelling during round-the-world flight.

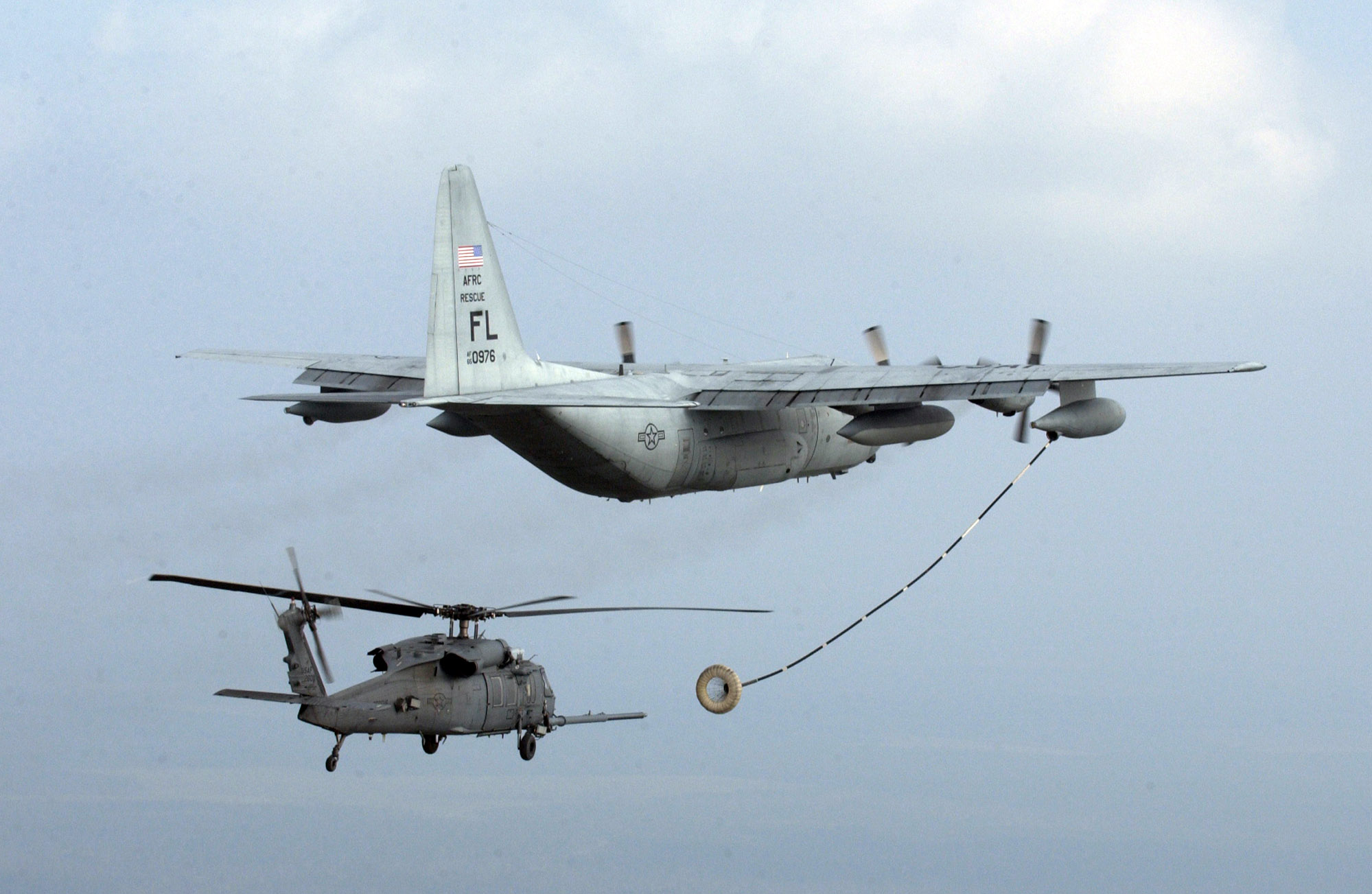
Helicopter with refuelling probe approaching the drogue trailed by a tanker.

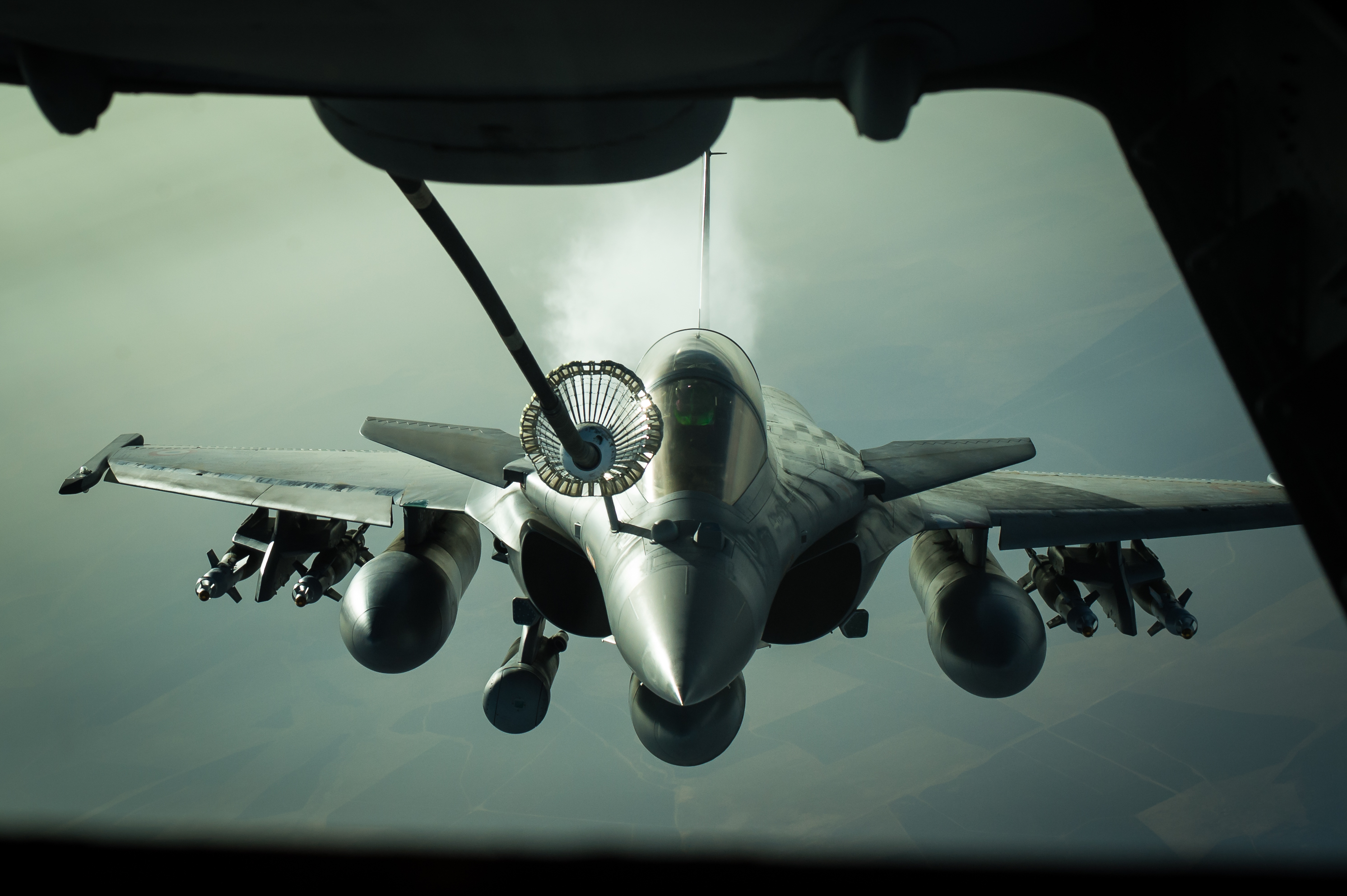
Probe inserted in drogue for refuelling.

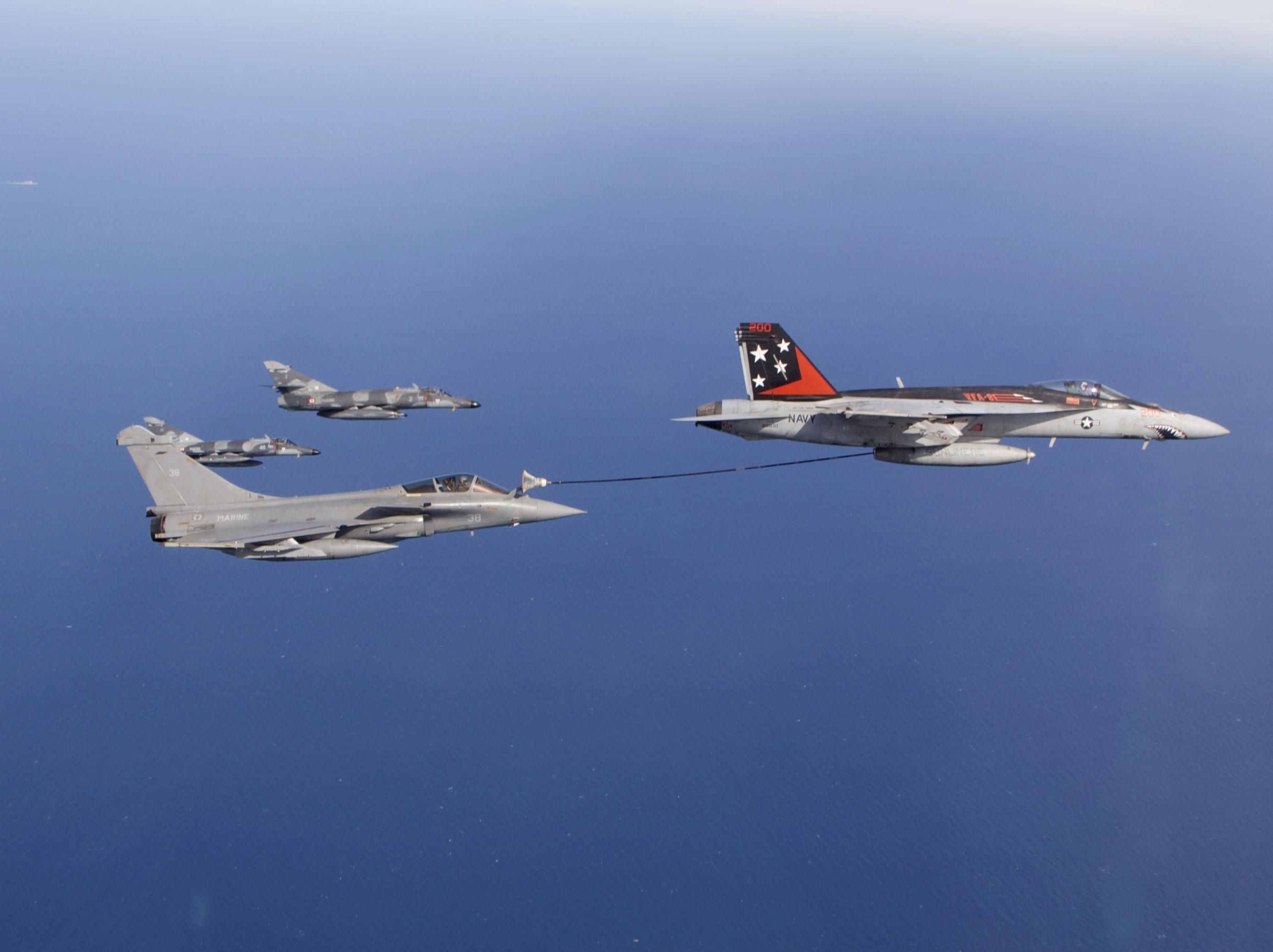
Buddy refuelling.

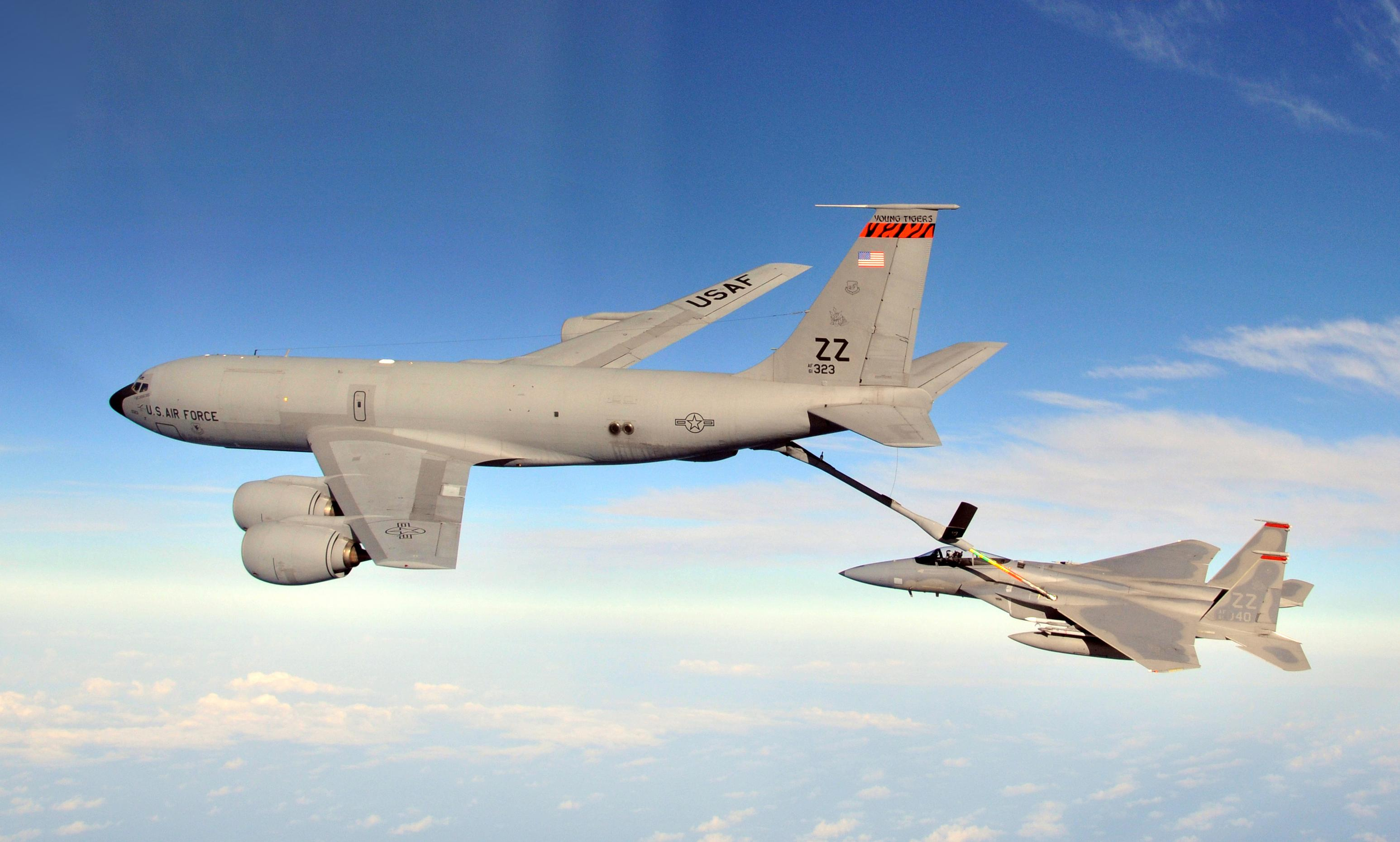
Flying boom refuelling.

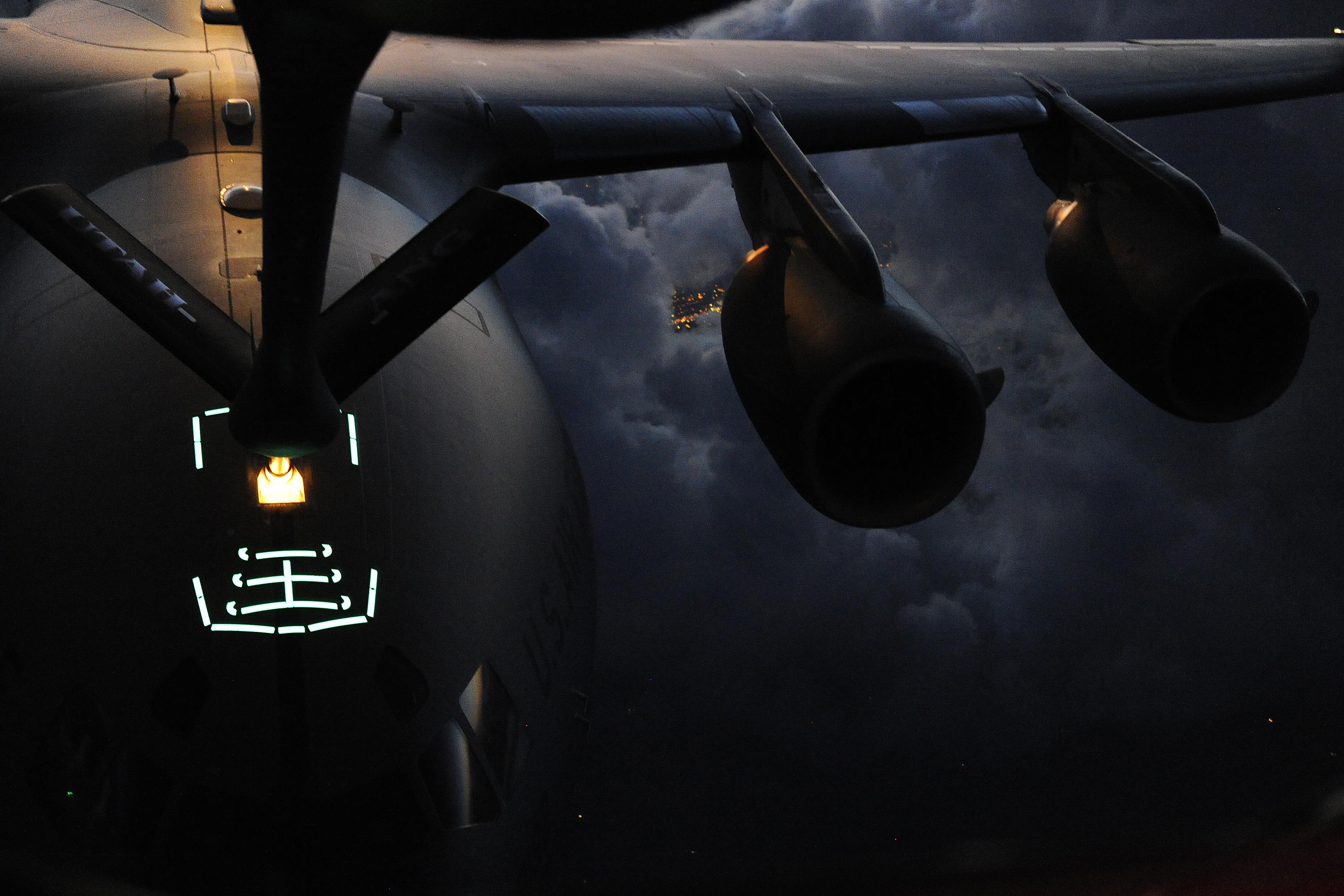
Flying boom refuelling at night.

== List of aircraft ==
military tanker aircraft used to refuel other aircraft in flight
Tanker aircraft	based on	aircraft propulsion method	Fuel supply method	Operators	Date entered use	Current status	Qty	Notes
Airbus A310 MRTT	Airbus; A310-300C	2x turbofan jet	probe and drogue	Canada / France / Germany	2004	operational	6	Two for Royal Canadian Air Force (RCAF), known in service as CC-150T Polaris
Airbus A330 MRTT	Airbus; A330-200	2x turbofan jet	probe and drogue	United Kingdom	2011	production/ operational	7 KC2; 5(+2) KC3	In Royal Air Force (RAF) service, it is exclusively hose-and-drogue, and is known as Voyager KC2 (two under-wing hose and drogue) and Voyager KC3 (two under-wing hose and drogue plus under-fuselage centreline high capacity hose and drogue), with no self-refuelling capability. 14 aircraft have been delivered: seven KC2, five KC3 and two fitted out as KC3.
Airbus A330 MRTT	Airbus; A330-200	2x turbofan jet	flying boom	Australia / Saudi Arabia / Spain / United Arab Emirates / Singapore / Poland / |Canada / Italy / Multinational Multi-Role Tanker Transport Fleet	?	production/ operational	61	Versions operated by the Australian (designated KC-30), Emirati, Saudi, Polish air forces and the Multinational Multi-Role Tanker Transport Fleet are equipped with both a flying boom and hose and drogue refuelling units.
Airbus; A400M; Atlas	Airbus; A400M; Atlas	4x Europrop TP400 turboprop	probe and drogue	Spain / Germany / France	2013	production/ operational		
Airco DH.4	Airco DH.4	propeller	gravity flow hose	United States	1923	retired	1	US Army Air Service trials at Rockwell Field, San Diego, California.
Avro Lancaster	Avro Lancaster	4x propeller	probe and drogue	United Kingdom	1948	retired		Purchased and converted by Flight Refuelling Limited (FRL).
Avro Lancastrian	Avro Lancaster	4x propeller	probe and drogue	United Kingdom	1948	retired	4	Purchased and converted by Flight Refuelling Limited (FRL), two Lancastrian tankers were based at Shannon, Ireland; the other two in North America, at Goose Bay, Labrador, and Gander, Newfoundland.
Avro Lincoln	Avro Lincoln	4x propeller	probe and drogue	United Kingdom		retired		Purchased and converted by Flight Refuelling Limited (FRL).
Avro Vulcan K.2	Avro Vulcan	4x jet	probe and drogue	United Kingdom	1982	retired	6	Conversions as interim until VC.10 tankers ready.
Blackburn; Buccaneer S.2	Blackburn; Buccaneer; S.2	2x turbofan jet	probe and drogue	United Kingdom		retired		Buddy-buddy refuelling.
Boeing; KB-29M	Boeing B-29 Superfortress	4x propeller	probe and drogue	United States	1948	retired	126	The world's first aerial refuelling units were created; the 43d Air Refueling Squadron at Davis-Monthan AFB, Arizona, and the 509th at Walker AFB, Roswell, New Mexico. Earlier KB-29M versions used a 'grappling hose' system, later models used a true probe and drogue. One KB-29M, redesignated YKB-29T (nicknamed 'Triple Nipple'), was modified to have another two refuelling hoses on its wingtip.
Boeing; KB-29P	Boeing B-29 Superfortress	4x propeller	flying boom	United States	1948	retired	100+	
Boeing; KB-50	Boeing B-50 Superfortress	4x propeller	probe and drogue	United States		retired		An improved model of the B-29 Superfortress.
Boeing; KB-50	Boeing B-50 Superfortress	4x propeller	flying boom	United States		retired		A B-29 derivative.
Boeing KC-97 Stratofreighter	Boeing C-97 Stratofreighter	4x propeller	flying boom	United States / Israel		retired		Based on the B-50, itself another B-29 Superfortress descendant.
Boeing; KC-135; Stratotanker	Boeing; 367-80 (Dash 80)	4x jet	flying boom	United States / Turkey / Chile		operational		Boom can be fitted pre-flight with a drogue adapter. AdlA (French Air and Space Force) C-135FR/KC-135R Stratotankers used the probe and drogue system and have been replaced by the Airbus A330MRTT 'Phenix'. Singapore's KC-135s have been replaced by A330MRTT's and were sold to Meta Aerospace in the USA.
Boeing MQ-25 Stingray	Boeing MQ-25 Stingray	turbofan	probe and drogue	United States		in development		aerial refueling drone
Boeing KC-707	Boeing 707	4x jet	probe and drogue	Israel / Spain / Italy / United States		operational		New built and conversions of airliners with multi-point refuelling system pods. Israel allegedly converted ex-airliners with booms from withdrawn KC-97's. Formerly Operated by the RCAF as CC-137 Husky, Spain and Italy have retired their 707 tanker aircraft. Omega Aerial Refueling Services operates two in the United States.
Boeing KC-33	Boeing; 747-100	4x jet	flying boom	Iran		retired	4	KC-33A is a modified Boeing 747 which lost in the USAF bidding competition to the KC-10 Extender. Four sold to the Iranian Air Force, one operational remaining until 16 June 2025 when it was destroyed by an Israeli missile strike at Mashad Air Base, Iran.
Boeing 767MMTT	Boeing 767	2x jet	probe and drogue	Colombia	?	production/ operational	1	Multi Mission Tanker Transport (MMTT) conversion by IAI for the Fuerza Aérea Colombiana (FAC), a 767-200ER fitted with two ARP3 refuelling pods under the wings, and cargo door.
Boeing KC-767	Boeing; 767-200ER	2x jet	flying boom/probe ad drogue	Italy / Japan	?	operational	8	With cockpit updates, was (eventually) the winning entry in the USAF KC-X competition.
Boeing KC-46 Pegasus	Boeing; 767-200ER	2x jet	flying boom	United States	?	production/ operational	93	USAF designation for Boeing's updated winning KC-767 entry.
Boeing F/A-18E/F Super Hornet	Boeing F/A-18E/F Super Hornet	2x jet	probe and drogue	United States		operational		Equipped for buddy-buddy refuelling as 'Strike tankers'. Taking over tanking duties after the S-3 was retired from service.
Consolidated; B-24 Liberator	Consolidated B-24 Liberator	4x propeller		United States	1943	retired		Used for flight tests with a B–17E receiver.
Dassault-Breguet Super Étendard	Dassault-Breguet Super Étendard	jet	probe and drogue	France		retired		Buddy-buddy refuelling.
Dassault Rafale	Dassault Rafale	2x jet	probe and drogue	France		production/ operational		Buddy-buddy refuelling.
de Havilland Sea Vixen	de Havilland Sea Vixen	2x jet	probe and drogue	United Kingdom		retired		Buddy-buddy refuelling.
Douglas; KA-3B; Skywarrior	Douglas A-3 Skywarrior	jet	probe and drogue	United States		retired		Dedicated tanker variant of the Skywarrior. Primary US Navy tanker from the Vietnam War until retirement prior to Desert Storm.
Douglas A-4 Skyhawk	Douglas A-4 Skyhawk	turbojet	probe and drogue	United States		retired		Buddy-buddy refuelling.
Douglas C-1	Douglas C-1	propeller	gravity flow hose	United States	1929	retired	2	The C-1 was a single-engine transport, 6,445-pound biplane, transformed into tankers by installing two 150-gallon tanks for off-loading, and a refuelling hose that passed through a hatch cut in the floor.
Embraer; KC-390	Embraer C-390 Millennium	2x turbofan	probe and drogue	Brazil		production/ operational		Cobham air-to-air refuelling system.
Grumman; KA-6D; Intruder	Grumman A-6 Intruder	2x jet	probe and drogue	United States		retired		Dedicated tanker variant of the Intruder. Attack variants of the A-6 also capable of buddy-buddy tanking.
Handley; Page; HP.54; Harrow	Handley; Page; HP.54; Harrow	2x propeller	looped hose	United Kingdom	1939	retired	3	Three Harrows were operated by Flight Refuelling Limited, and refuelled Short Empire flying boats on transatlantic services, two from Gander, Newfoundland and one based in Foynes, Ireland.
Handley Page; Type W	Handley Page; W.10	2x propeller	looped hose	United Kingdom	1935	retired	2	Early trials and demonstrations by Flight Refuelling Ltd using a piston engined biplane.
Handley; Page; Victor	Handley; Page; Victor	4x jet	probe and drogue	United Kingdom	1965	retired	30	B(K).1A, K.1, K.1A and K.2 variants in Royal Air Force service, operated by No. 55 Squadron from RAF Marham. A number of Victor tankers saw action during Black Buck raids of the 1982 Falklands War, refuelling the Avro Vulcan bombers multiple times during each bombing run. Fleet retired October 1993.
Ilyushin Il-78 Midas	Ilyushin Il-76	4x turbofan	probe and drogue	USSR, India, China, Pakistan, Algeria, Russia, Ukraine	1984	production/ operational	53	
Lockheed C-130 Hercules	C-130 Hercules & C-130J Super Hercules	4x turboprop	probe and drogue	Canada / United States		production/ operational		Variants: Royal Canadian Air Force modified C-130H, United States Marine Corps modified C-130F.
KC-130 Hercules	C-130 Hercules &C-130J Super Hercules	4x turboprop	probe and drogue	Canada / United States / Italy	1960	production/ operational	180	
Lockheed; KS-3B	Lockheed S-3 Viking	2x turbofan	probe and drogue	United States		retired		The former primary US Navy carrier-based tanker, equipped for buddy-buddy tanking.
Lockheed; TriStar; K1/KC1	Lockheed; L-1011-500; TriStar	3x turbofan	probe and drogue	United Kingdom	1986	retired	6	Two K1 and four KC1 variants operated by No. 216 Squadron Royal Air Force from RAF Brize Norton. Fleet retired 24 March 2014.
LTV A-7; Corsair II	LTV A-7; Corsair II	jet	probe and drogue	Greece / United States		retired		Equipped for buddy-buddy tanking in US Navy and Greek Air Force service.
McDonnell; Douglas; KDC-10	McDonnell; Douglas; DC-10	3x jet	probe and drogue	United States		operational		Converted DC-10-40s operated by Omega Aerial Refueling Services and Global Airtanker Service.
McDonnell; Douglas; KC-10; Extender	McDonnell; Douglas; DC-10	3x jet	flying boom	Netherlands / United States		retired		Also has a retractable hose and drogue that can be selected in-flight. Can be fitted with two underwing pods (similar to the KC-135's MPRS) capable of simultaneously refuelling two receiver aircraft (Wing Air Refueling Pods or WARPs). The Royal Netherlands Air Force operates one out of originally two KDC-10s; former civil aircraft modified to a standard similar to the KC-10. The remaining KDC-10 will be withdrawn by the end of 2021. After overhaul, it will follow the other KDC-10 to be operated with Omega Aerial Refueling Services.
Mikoyan; MiG-29K	Mikoyan; MiG-29M	jet	probe and drogue	USSR/India		operational		Buddy-buddy refuelling.
Myasishchev; M-4-2	Myasishchev; M-4 bomber	4x jet	probe and drogue	USSR		retired		
Myasishchev; 3MS-2	Myasishchev; 3M bomber	4x jet	probe and drogue	USSR		retired		
Panavia; Tornado	Panavia; Tornado	2x turbofan	probe and drogue			retired		Buddy-buddy refuelling.
Sukhoi; Su-24M	Sukhoi; Su-24	2x jet	probe and drogue	USSR		operational		Equipped for buddy-buddy refuelling in the Russian Air Force with the in-flight refuelling pod (Russian: universalny podvesnoy agregat zapravki – UPAZ) container as 'Strike tankers'.
Sukhoi Su-30MKI	Sukhoi Su-30	2x jet	probe and drogue	Russia/India		production/ operational		Buddy-buddy refuelling
de Havilland Sea Vixen	de Havilland Sea Vixen	2x jet	probe and drogue	United Kingdom		retired		Buddy-buddy refuelling.
Sukhoi; Su-33	Sukhoi; Su-33	2x jet	probe and drogue	USSR		operational		Buddy-buddy refuelling.
Supermarine; Scimitar	Supermarine; Scimitar	jet	probe and drogue	United Kingdom		retired		Buddy-buddy refuelling.
Tupolev; Tu-16N	Tupolev; Tu-16 bomber	2x jet	probe and drogue	USSR		retired		
Tupolev; Tu-16Z	Tupolev; Tu-16	2x jet	wing to wing	USSR		retired		
Vickers; Valiant B(K).1, B(PR)K.1	Vickers; Valiant	4x jet	probe and drogue	United Kingdom		retired		The Valiants had removable tanker system in the bomb bay. Operated by Royal Air Force.
Vickers; VC10; C1K, K2, K3, K4	Vickers; VC10	4x turbofan	probe and drogue	United Kingdom		retired	27	C1K (13), K2 (5), K3 (4), and K4 (5) variants served with the Royal Air Force, operated by 10 Squadron, 101 Squadron, and 1312 Flight. Fleet retired 20 September 2013.
Xian; HY-6	Xian; H-6	2x jet	probe and drogue	China		production/ operational		People's Liberation Army Air Force (PLAAF) of China.
Xian; YU-20	Xian; Y-20	4x jet	probe and drogue	China		production/ operational		People's Liberation Army Air Force (PLAAF) of China.

== See also ==
- List of United States military aerial refueling aircraft
