= Boeing KC-46 Pegasus =

American military aerial refueling and transport aircraft

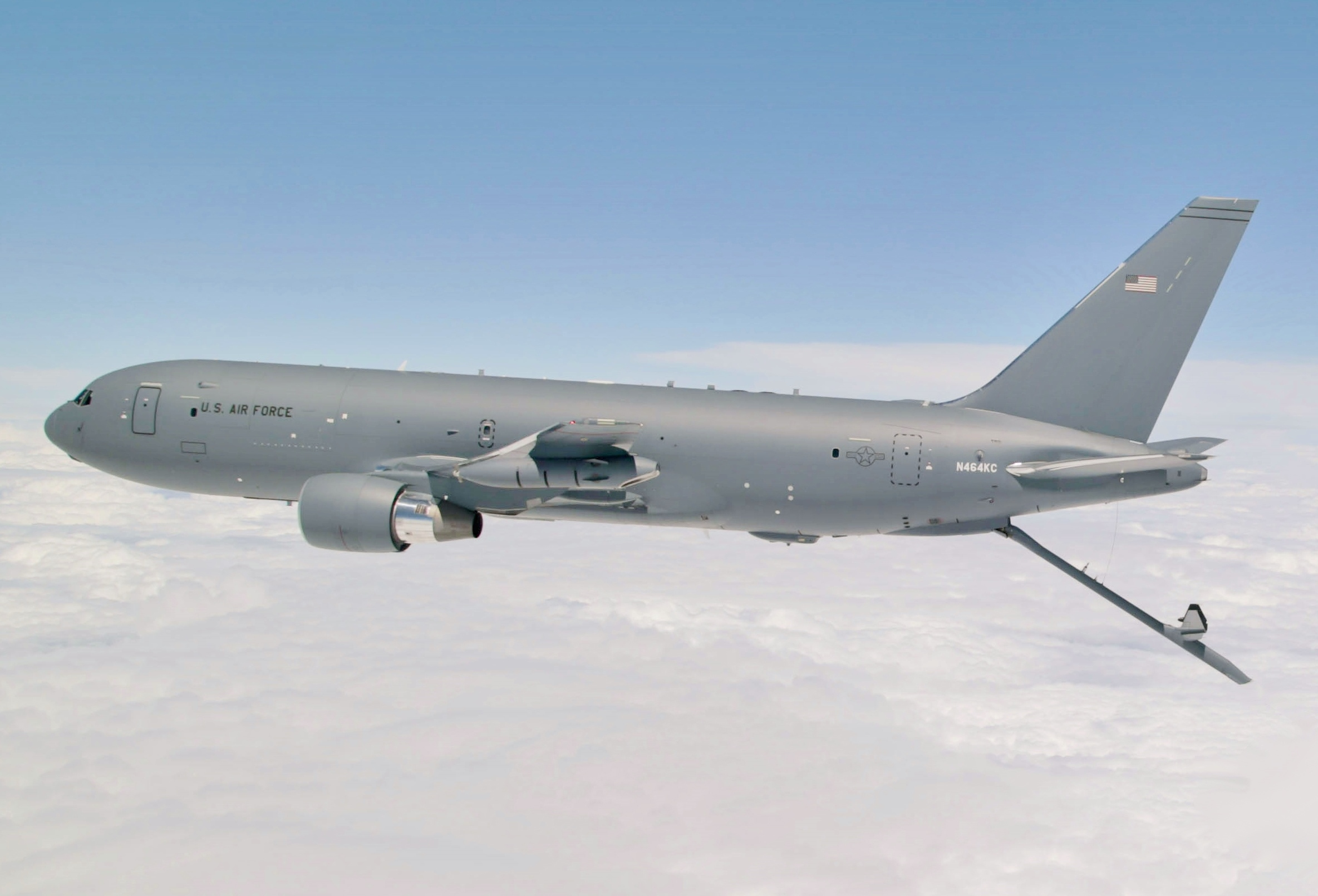
- A U.S. Air Force KC-46A with refueling boom lowered

General information
- Type: Tanker/transport
- National origin: United States
- Manufacturer: Boeing Defense, Space & Security
- Status: In service
- Primary users: U.S. Air Force (USAF): Japan Air Self-Defense Force; Israeli Air Force
- Number built: 113 as of Aug 2026

History
- Manufactured: 2013–present
- Introduction date: 2019
- First flight: 25 September 2015
- Developed from: Boeing KC-767

The Boeing KC-46 Pegasus is an American military aerial refueling and strategic military transport aircraft developed by Boeing from its 767 jet airliner. In February 2011, the tanker was selected by the United States Air Force (USAF) as the winner in the KC-X tanker competition to replace older Boeing KC-135 Stratotankers. The first aircraft was delivered to the USAF in January 2019.

The United States Air Force has taken delivery of 105 KC-46A aircraft and intends to procure 263 in total, a number which has grown with the cancellation of the KC-Y program and may grow further if the Next Generation Air-refueling System (NGAS) program does not develop as planned. Other nations which operate or have purchased the KC-46A include Japan and Israel.

== Development ==
=== Background ===
In 2001, the U.S. Air Force began a procurement program to replace around 100 of its oldest KC-135E Stratotankers, and selected Boeing's KC-767. The Boeing tanker received the KC-767A designation from the United States Department of Defense in 2002 and appeared in the 2004 edition of DoD model designation report. The USAF decided to lease 100 KC-767 tankers from Boeing.

U.S. Senator John McCain and others criticized the draft leasing agreement as being wasteful and problematic. In response to protests, the USAF struck a compromise in November 2003, whereby it would purchase 80 KC-767s and lease 20 more. In December 2003, the Pentagon announced a freeze on the program over an investigation into alleged corruption that led to the jailing of one of its former procurement executives who applied to work for Boeing. The KC-767A contract was canceled by the DoD in January 2006.

=== USAF KC-X program ===
In 2006, the USAF released a request for proposal (RFP) for a new tanker program, KC-X, to be selected by 2007. Boeing announced it may enter a higher capability tanker based on the Boeing 777, named the KC-777 Strategic Tanker. Airbus partnered with Northrop Grumman to offer the Airbus A330 MRTT, the tanker version of the A330, which was marketed to the USAF under the designation KC-30. In January 2007, the USAF issued the KC-X Aerial Refueling Aircraft RFP, calling for 179 tankers, four system development and demonstration and 175 production, in a contract worth an estimated US$40 billion (~$59.7 billion in 2025). Northrop and EADS expressed dissatisfaction at how the RFP was structured and threatened to withdraw, leaving only Boeing in the running.

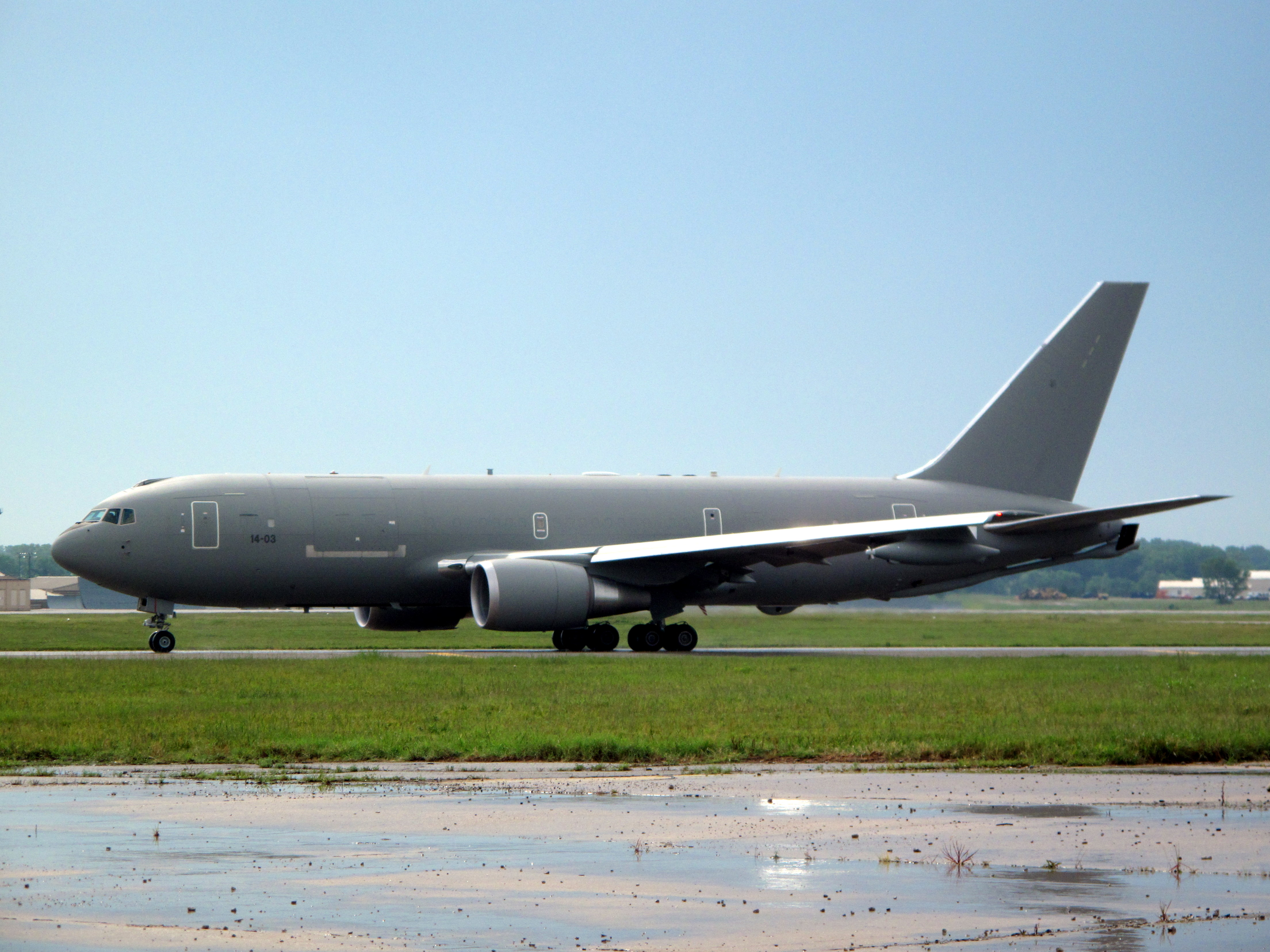
An Italian Air Force KC-767 on the apron at McConnell AFB/Boeing Factory in Wichita, Kansas, in 2010

In February 2007, Boeing announced it was offering the KC-767 Advanced Tanker for the KC-X, stating that the KC-767 was a better fit than the KC-777 for the requirements. In April 2007, Boeing submitted its KC-767 tanker proposal to USAF. The KC-767 offered for this KC-X round was based on the in-development 767-200LRF (Long Range Freighter), rather than the -200ER on which Italian and Japanese KC-767 aircraft are based, differing by combining the -200ER fuselage, -300F wing, gear, cargo door and floor, -400ER digital flightdeck and flaps, uprated engines, and "sixth-generation" fly-by-wire fuel delivery boom.

Boeing submitted its final proposal in January 2008. In February 2008, the DoD chose the KC-30 over the KC-767, the USAF subsequently designated it KC-45A. Boeing submitted a protest to the United States Government Accountability Office (GAO) in March 2008 and waged a public relations campaign in support of their protest. In June, after USAF admissions on bidding process flaws, the GAO upheld Boeing's protest and recommended the contract be rebid. In July 2008, Defense Secretary Robert Gates announced that the USAF would reopen bidding, and put the contract into an "expedited recompetition" with Defense Undersecretary John Young in charge of the selection process, not the USAF. A draft of the revised RFP was provided to contractors in August 2008 for comments. However, in September 2008, the DoD canceled the KC-X solicitation.

In September 2009, the USAF began a new round of bids with clearer criteria, including reducing the number of requirements from 800 to 373 in an attempt to simplify the process and allow more objective decision making. In March 2010, Boeing announced it would bid the KC-767 for the new KC-X round. EADS stated in April 2010 it would submit a bid without Northrop Grumman as a U.S. partner. Boeing submitted its KC-767 "NewGen Tanker" bid, based on the 767-200 with an improved version of the KC-10's refueling boom, and cockpit displays from the 787, in July 2010. Boeing submitted a revised bid in February 2011.

In addition to the KC-X, observers speculate that a modified KC-46 would be used as the basis of the KC-Y tanker program, the second step of the USAF's three-step tanker renewal plan, as replacing it with something entirely new would likely be too big a risk. In September 2016, Air Mobility Command stated that the follow-on KC-Y acquisition program to replace the remaining KC-135s had been abandoned in favor of further KC-46s with upgrades.

=== Selection and early development ===
In February 2011, the USAF announced the selection of Boeing's KC-767 bid, which was designated KC-46A. Boeing was awarded a development contract, which called for the delivery of 18 initial operational KC-46s by 2017. The USAF sought a total of 179 new tankers. In June 2011, development costs were reportedly projected to overrun by about $300 million (~$423 million in 2025). Boeing would be responsible for this amount, which exceeds the contract cost cap of $4.9 billion. In July 2011, revised projections indicated a reduced cost overrun. In 2013, the USAF added additional crews and flight hours to their future plans in response to a review that showed that the best of current plans did not take full advantage of the KC-46's cargo and aeromedical evacuation advantages over the KC-135.

In August 2013, Boeing and the USAF completed a critical design review (CDR) for the KC-46. With the CDR complete, the design was set and production and testing could proceed. Wing assembly for the first aircraft began in June 2013. Flight testing of the 767-2C airframe, which would be reconfigured into the KC-46, was scheduled to begin in mid-2014. The first fully equipped KC-46 was projected to fly in early 2015. The contract called for Boeing to build four test aircraft and deliver 18 combat-ready tankers by August 2017. The USAF intended to buy 179 KC-46s, with all delivered by 2028.

In December 2013, Boeing joined the wings and fuselage for the first 767-2C to be adapted into a KC-46A. The first of four 767-2C provision freighters were to complete assembly by the end of January 2014. Once assembled, it would go through ground vibration and instrumentation testing and have body fuel tanks added. The first test flight would occur during summer 2014 and include measuring its rate of climb and descent. The Engineering Manufacturing and Design (EMD) model was to be integrated with the needed systems and technologies to become a military-standard KC-46A by January 2015. Seven low-rate production KC-46s were to be delivered in 2015, 12 in 2016, and 15 delivered annually from 2017 to 2027. The last of four test aircraft began assembly in January 2014.

In April 2014, the GAO found that the KC-46 program was projected to underrun its projected cost estimate of $51.7 billion by $300 million. The program acquisition unit cost per jet will be $287 million, $1.8 million less than estimated. The GAO noted that delays in training air crew and maintainers could cause testing to slip 6–12 months, but stated that the program had not missed any major milestones and that the development of about 15.8 million lines of software code was progressing as planned. In May 2014, the USAF estimated the development program's cost, including the first four aircraft, could rise from $4.4–4.9 billion to $5.85 billion.

In July 2014, Boeing recorded a $272 million pre-tax charge to cover the tanker's wiring redesign. The wiring issue arose when it was found that 5-10% of the wiring bundles did not have sufficient separation distance or were not properly shielded to meet a USAF requirement for double or triple-redundant wiring for some mission systems. In September 2014, it was confirmed that the wiring redesign would delay the first 767-2C flight from June 2014 to November 2014. In March 2015, the program cost to develop and procure 179 tankers was projected to total US$43.16 billion (~$57.2 billion in 2025).

=== Flight tests and delays ===
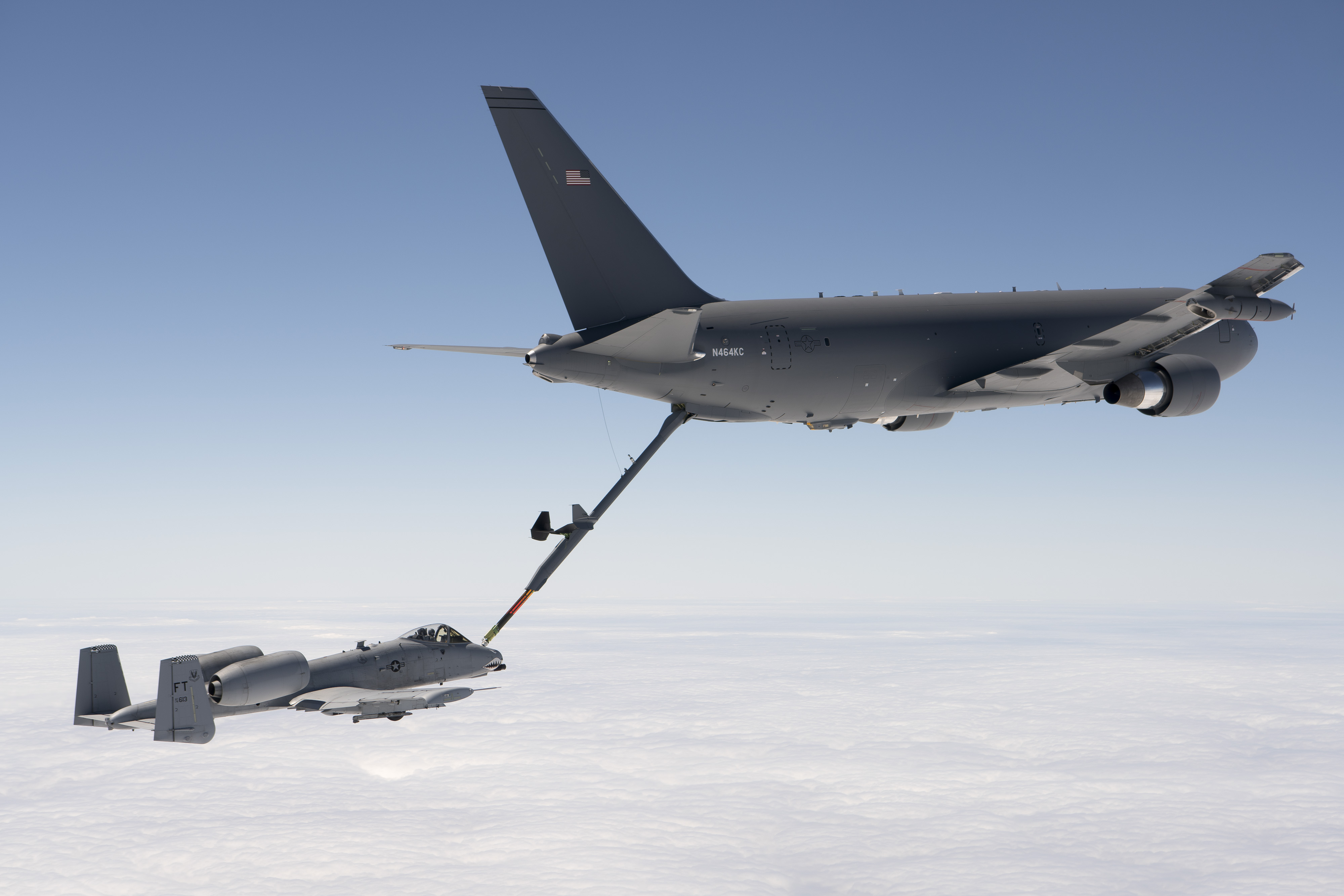
A KC-46A refuels an A-10 Thunderbolt II.

The 767-2C's first flight took place on 28 December 2014. It flew from Paine Field and landed at Boeing Field. In March 2015, a refueling test with a C-17 transport was stopped because of a higher-than-expected boom axial load while delivering fuel. The problem was caused by the turbulent "bow wave effect" generated by two large aircraft flying in line. In January 2016, the KC-46 successfully refueled an F-16 for the first time during a five hour 36 minute sortie. Test refueling of several other military aircraft followed, including a C-17, F/A-18, A-10, and AV-8B. In February 2016, a KC-46 refueled an F/A-18, using its probe-and-drogue system for the first time.

In July 2015, Boeing announced a further $835 million (~$1.11 billion in 2025) pretax charge for the faulty integrated fuel system's redesign and retrofit. Wiring and fuel system flaws could delay contracts worth $3 billion for up to eight months. Following schedule revisions agreed by the USAF and Boeing, the first flight of a fully equipped KC-46 was delayed to as late as September 2015. The Bank of America/Merrill Lynch noted in July 2015 "We fail to understand how Boeing could take a $1.26 billion (~$1.67 billion in 2025) pre-tax charge (since it won the contract over Airbus) on the Boeing KC-46A program since the program is based on the 767 airframe that has been in production for over 30 years."

In March 2016, the Defense Contract Management Agency reportedly had low confidence in the August 2017 deadline, predicting the first 18 tankers' delivery to run about seven months late based on past performance and current risks, such as production delays, a new joint USAF-Boeing schedule review, and flight test uncertainties. The Pentagon's test office was to start combat testing in April 2017. An April 2016 GAO report projected an additional four months beyond the August 2017 target to deliver 18 KC-46s, and that operational testing will not begin until May 2017 and will not be completed until two months after delivery of the first 18 aircraft, risking late discoveries of problems. The GAO noted that Boeing had not obtained Federal Aviation Administration's approval for two key aerial refueling systems—the centerline drogue system and the wing aerial refueling pods, which were built without following FAA processes—Boeing projected readiness for FAA certification by July 2017, over three years late. The 18 KC-46s were to include the four EMD aircraft raised to operational standards, plus the first 14 low-rate production tankers. Instead, 16 of the 18 were off the production line. Boeing was liable for all late design fixes on tankers delivered before testing ended.

In April 2016, the fourth test aircraft, 767-2C EMD-3, first flew. EMD-3 focused on environmental control systems, including temperature and smoke penetration testing. Two days later, Boeing took another pre-tax charge of $243 million for cost overruns, bringing the total amount paid for tanker cost overruns to $1.5 billion. Boeing president and chief executive Dennis Muilenburg stated that 80% of the test points required for a positive Milestone C decision had been completed. Flight testing helped determine whether a refueling fault could be resolved by either software or hardware changes, which Boeing worked on in parallel. In May 2016, a further delay of at least six months due to technical and supply chain issues was reported, potentially requiring program re-structuring and cuts. At the time, only 20% of the flight tests were completed. In June 2016, USAF spokesman Maj. Rob Leese confirmed that, while the contract with Boeing lacked predefined delay penalties, not delivering the 18 certified KC-46s by August 2017 was a contract schedule breach, and that the USAF would receive considerations from Boeing in the schedule re-baseline after the RRA delay. In July 2016, US Defense Acquisitions Chief Frank Kendall confirmed that the tanker program office was studying the delay's cost to the USAF, and that it was entitled to consideration for losses from operating the KC-135 for longer than planned.

On 10 July 2016, Boeing's defense unit CEO, Leanne Caret, reported positive results from early flight tests with a modified boom. On 21 July 2016, Boeing took a further $393 million charge on the program, bringing the total value of penalties to almost $1.9 billion. The charge reflected higher costs associated with the schedule and technical challenges, such as the boom axial load issue, delays in the certification process and concurrency between testing and initial production. The initial 18 KC-46s were equipped with the boom and centerline drogue, but not the wing-mounted wing-aerial refueling pods (WARP) needed for full contractual Required Assets Available, they were delivered separately later.

On 5 July 2016, USAF spokesman Daryl Mayer stated that, despite the testing delays, Milestone C approval was expected in the following month, and that Boeing would add a fifth EMD aircraft to accelerate testing. EMD-1 and EMD-3 primarily conducted flight tests towards FAA airworthiness certificates, while EMD-2 and EMD-4 focused on USAF aerial refueling and mission system testing. An F-16 was successfully refueled on 8 July, and a C-17 on 12 July 2016. Once the hardware fix was verified, a KC-46 with the updated boom underwent regression testing on the F-16, followed by refueling demonstrations with the C-17 and A-10 for the final test for Milestone C approval. On 15 July 2016, the KC-46 successfully refueled an A-10, offloading 1,500 pounds of fuel at 15,000 feet. At the time, more than 900 flight test hours have been completed by the five EMD aircraft. On 12 August 2016, the program received Milestone C approval, indicating production readiness. The issuing of contracts for two lots covering 19 aircraft was expected within 30 days.

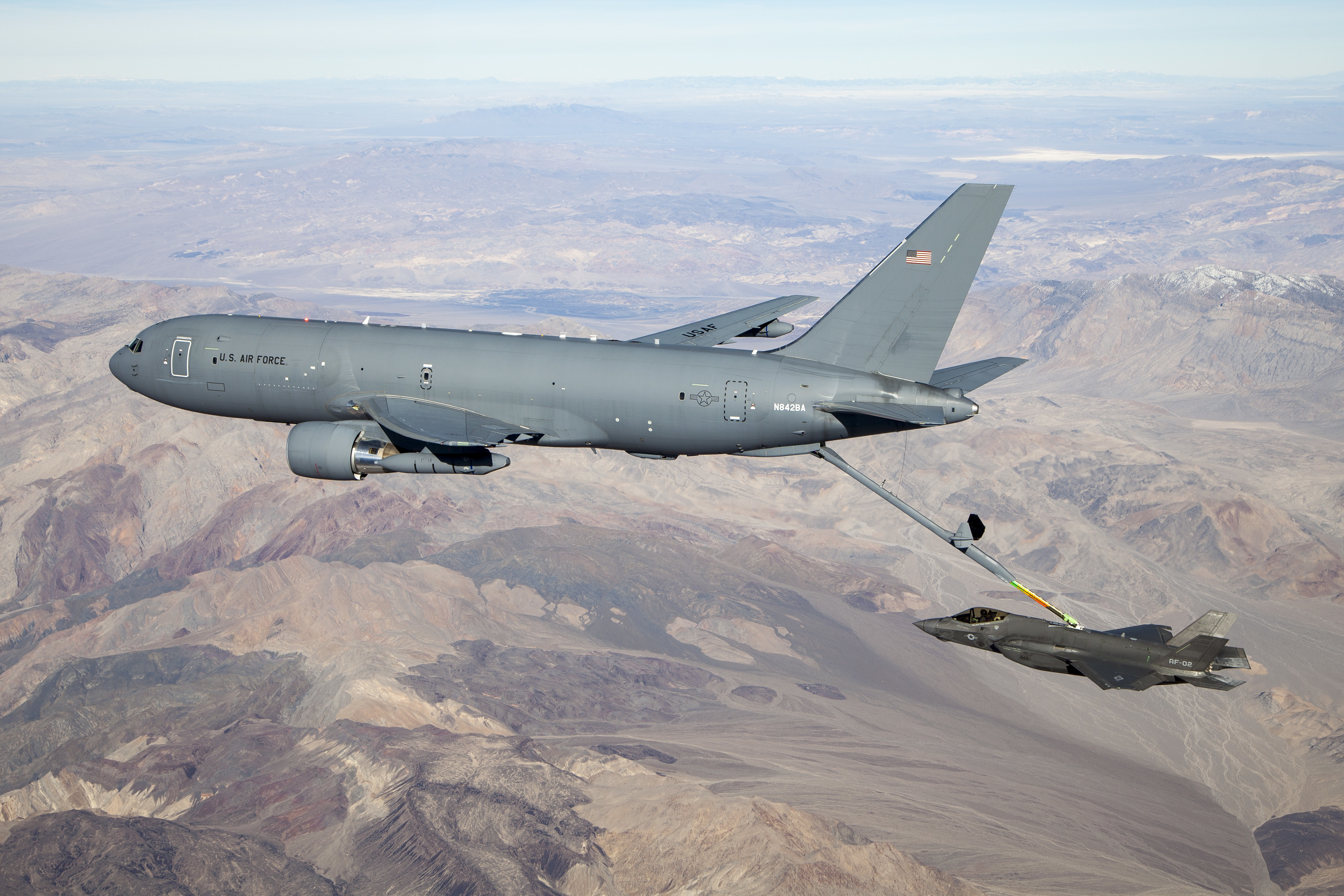
A KC-46A connects with an F-35A Lightning II over California, 2019.

In January 2018, final FAA certification testing was reportedly roughly 94 percent complete. Boeing announced its FAA certification in September 2018, with military certification outstanding. Aircraft refueled during testing include the F-16, F/A-18, AV-8B, C-17, A-10, KC-10, KC-135 and the KC-46 itself. In January 2019, a KC-46 from the 418th Flight Test Squadron at Edwards AFB made connection with an F-35A, the occasion being the first time that the KC-46 connected with a fifth-generation jet fighter. Completion of refueling certification of the F-35 by the KC-46 was announced by the 412th Test Wing in June 2019.

In March 2020, the USAF announced that chronic leaks in the fuel system had been upgraded to a Category I deficiency. The USAF identified the issue in June 2019, but had not originally believed it to be serious. Crews became aware of the issue when they discovered fuel between the primary and secondary fuel protection barriers. There was no known root cause at the time of the announcement. By January 2021, Boeing's losses on the program were estimated at $5 billion (~$5.85 billion in 2025). At the time, it was expected that the KC-46 would not be combat ready until at least late 2023.

=== Continuing development ===
Ongoing development efforts associated with the KC-46 aim to provide new capabilities and fix problems. In the FY27 budget request, the USAF proposed reallocating funds ($13M as requested) from the Next Generation air-refueling System (NGAS) to a new effort called the Advanced Tanker System (ATS). ATS will develop upgrades for connectivity, electronic warfare, and self-defense capabilities—many of the features associated with NGAS—for the existing tanker fleet. The USAF has clarified that they are not abandoning plans for the future NGAS.

On 14 July 2026, Steve Parker, CEO of Boeing Defense, said that the production rate of the KC-46 would be increasing to 24 per year, which is "exactly what the Air Force is looking for." He explained that with the production of the 767 freighter ending, that line has capacity to build the KC-46 faster. However, as the President's Budget for FY27 reflects a lower procurement rate of 18 KC-46 per year starting in FY28, it isn't clear whether this higher production rate incoporates Foreign Military Sales or whether the USAF would accept faster deliveries.

== Design ==
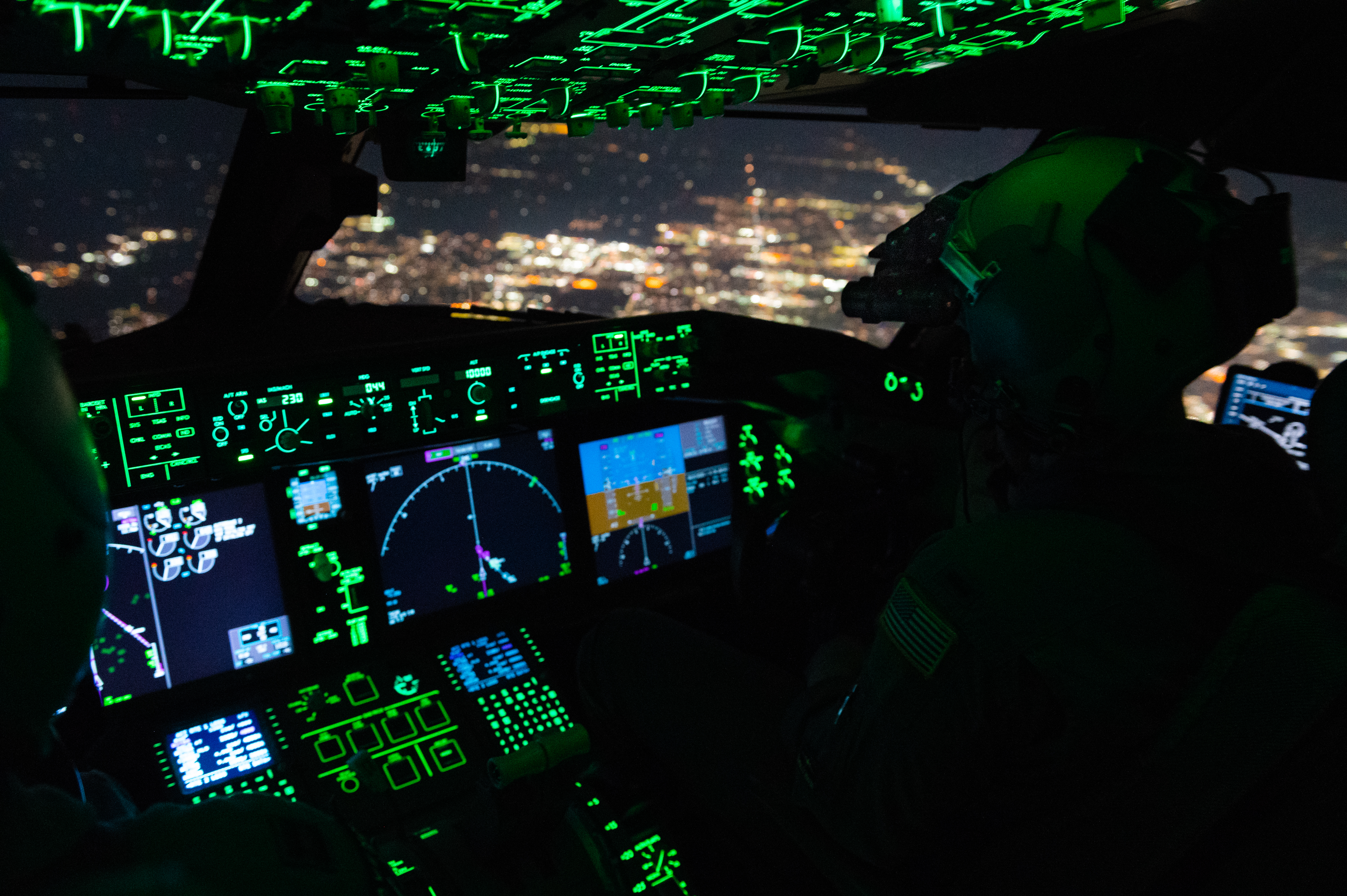
Cockpit of a KC-46A Pegasus

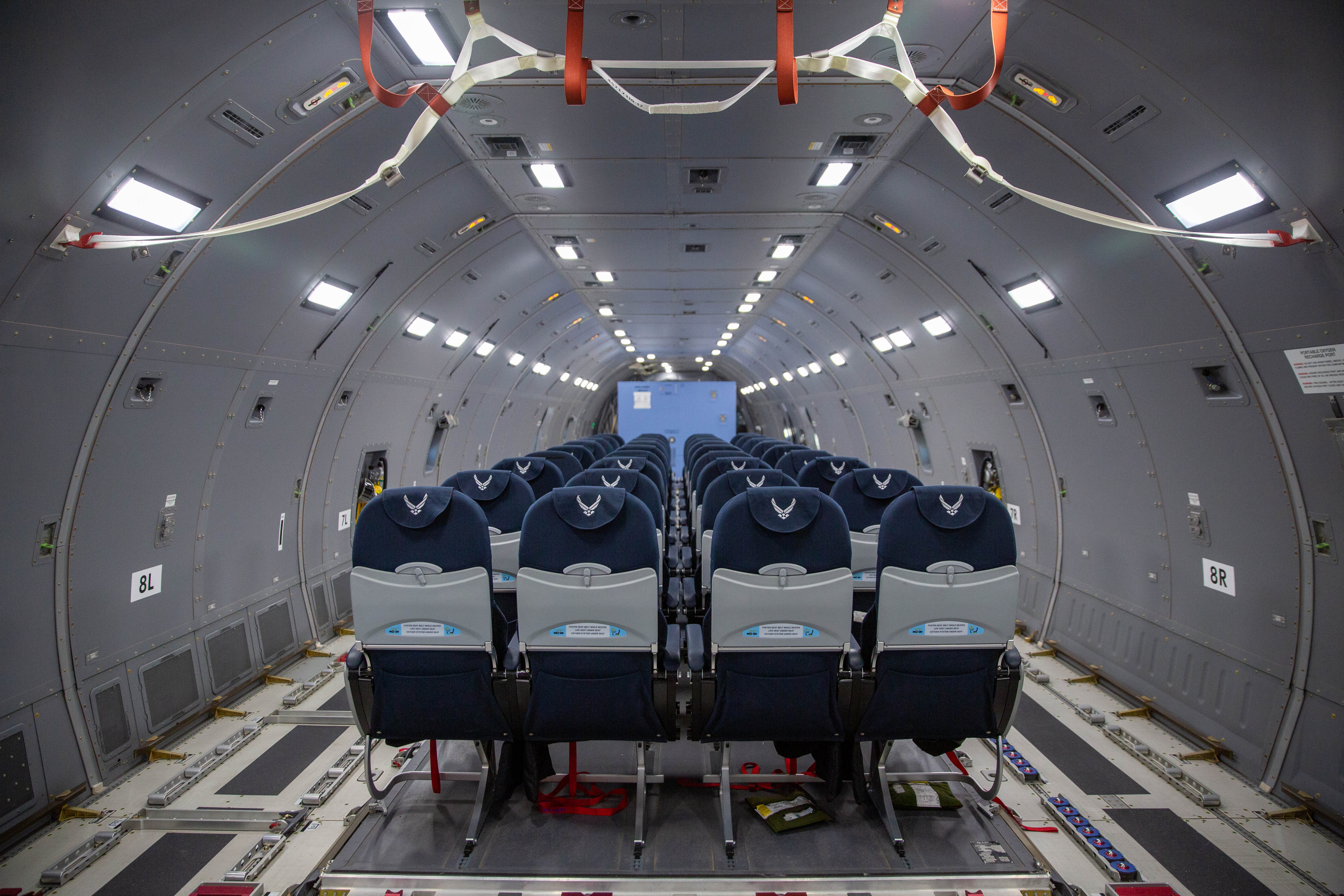
Seats fitted in the interior of a KC-46A

KC-46 Pegasus is a variant of the Boeing 767, a widebody, low-wing cantilever monoplane with a conventional empennage featuring a single fin and rudder. It is equipped with a retractable tricycle landing gear and a hydraulic flight control system. The aircraft is powered by two Pratt & Whitney PW4062 engines, one mounted under each wing. The KC-46 incorporates elements from multiple 767 variants, combining the fuselage of the 767-200ER with the wing, landing gear, cargo door, and floor of the 767-300F, along with the flaps of the 767-400ER. Its glass cockpit is based on that of the 787 Dreamliner, featuring four large LCD screens from Rockwell Collins. The KC-46 also utilizes a Maneuvering Characteristics Augmentation System (MCAS) similar to the one involved in the two 737 MAX crashes. However, unlike the 737 MAX, the KC-46's MCAS receives input from dual redundant angle of attack sensors and automatically disengages if the pilot applies stick input. Due to concerns over this system, the U.S. Air Force began reviewing KC-46 pilot training procedures in March 2019.

The aircraft can operate with as little as three crew members—two pilots and a boom operator. The boom operator station is located just behind the flight deck in an area called the crew compartment, which also contains eight airline style crew seats, three crew rest bunks, a galley, and a lavatory, supporting long-duration missions. In total, including jumpseats, the aircraft can accommodate up to 15 crew members. The aircraft is FAA-certified to transport up to 58 passengers in the rear fuselage using palletized seating similar to that of the C-17, along with a galley/lavatory pallet and passenger baggage loaded onto a cargo pallet. Boeing states that in contingency operations, the aircraft could accommodate up to 114 passengers. In an all-cargo configuration, the KC-46A can carry up to 65,000 pounds (29,000 kg) of cargo across 18 pallets. When configured for aeromedical evacuation, it can transport 54 patients—including 24 on litters—along with a crew of five, consisting of two flight nurses and three medical technicians, who are seated in the forward crew compartment during takeoff and landing. For quick access from the ground, a retractable ladder near the front landing gear can be deployed. The KC-46A can carry 212,299 pounds (96,297 kg) of fuel, 10 percent more than the KC-135. Its survivability is enhanced with infrared countermeasures and limited electronic warfare capabilities. The aircraft features manual flight controls, ensuring unrestricted maneuverability to evade threats throughout its flight envelope.

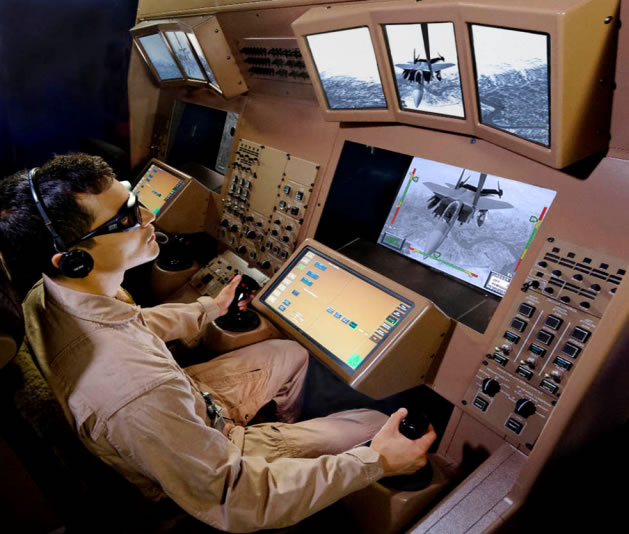
Aerial Refueling Operator Station

At the rear of the KC-46 is a refueling boom, complemented by wing-mounted drogue pods and a centerline drogue system under the rear fuselage, enabling both boom and drogue refueling in a single mission. The boom initially used a hydraulic relief valve system, similar to those on the KC-10 and KC-767, to reduce excessive axial pressure. However, to resolve a "stiff boom" issue, which prevented refueling of lightweight, thrust-limited aircraft like the A-10, Boeing replaced the actuator with a pressure-flow PQ valve. Externally, below the cockpit, the KC-46 is outfitted with director lights which can guide receiving aircraft to align for refueling with visual cues. The director lights allow for receiving pilots to know if their aircraft’s height, range, and alignment are safely within the boom’s reach. The director lights also have the added benefit of enhancing the safety for both the KC-46 and receiving aircraft during night time refueling operations.

Unlike traditional tankers, where a single boom operator is positioned at the tail with a direct line of sight, the KC-46 features two Aerial Refueling Operator Stations (AROS) just behind the flight deck. Having two AROS provides redundancy and makes it easier to train new boom operators. The AROS receives imagery from the Remote Vision System (RVS). Images from multispectral cameras are displayed on three screens, while a central 2D/3D display provides a rear-facing view. The system, which requires stereoscopic glasses for optimal effectiveness, further enhances refueling capabilities in complete darkness with both aircraft blacked out. The RVS has encountered issues such as depth compression and curvature distortions affecting motion perception. The upcoming RVS 2.0 upgrade will address these problems with enhanced cameras and a full-color high-definition display to improve depth perception. Despite these issues, the KC-46 provides improved automation and stability, according to airmen from the 2nd Air Refueling Squadron.

== Operational history ==
=== United States ===
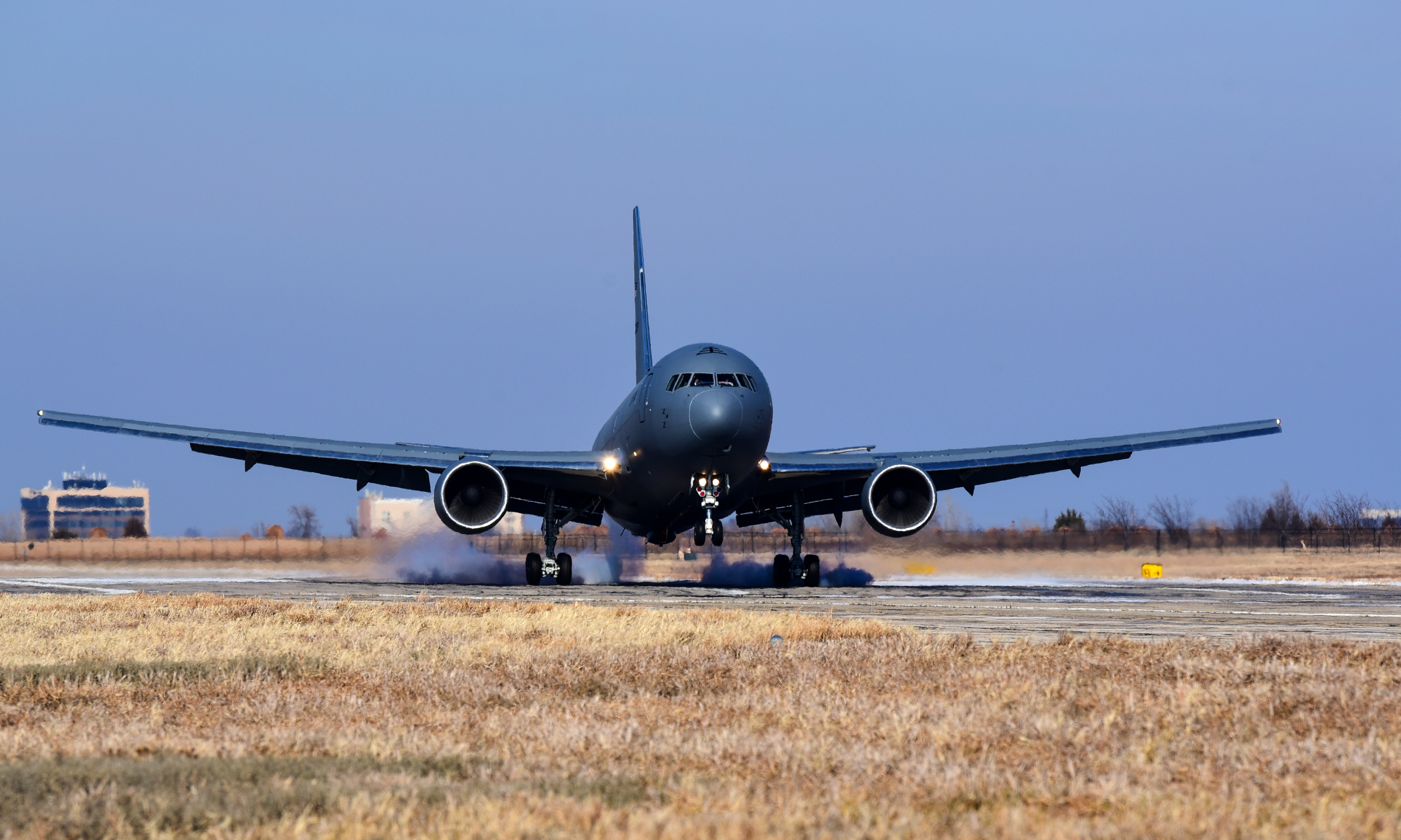
The first delivered KC-46A (15-46009) lands at McConnell AFB in January 2019.

In April 2014, the USAF announced that the KC-46 will be based at McConnell Air Force Base in Wichita, Kansas, with an optimistic expectation of receiving the first of 36 tankers in 2016. McConnell AFB was chosen because it had low construction costs and it is in a location with a high demand for air refueling, having KC-135s based there. In addition to McConnell AFB serving as the home base, up to 10 operating bases will be used by the KC-46. Crews will be trained at Altus Air Force Base, Oklahoma, which was also chosen for its limited construction needs and for its existing experience with training programs for the C-17 Globemaster and the KC-135.

In October 2015, the USAF announced that Seymour Johnson Air Force Base, North Carolina, was chosen as the preferred alternative for the first Reserve-led KC-46A main operating base, with an anticipated arrival of the KC-46As at Seymour Johnson in fiscal year 2019. Tinker Air Force Base, Oklahoma; Westover Air Reserve Base, Massachusetts; and Grissom Air Reserve Base, Indiana, were named as the reasonable alternatives. The October 2015 announcement also stated that the USAF intended to initiate an Environmental Impact Analysis Process (EIAP), which the USAF would use to make its final basing decisions.

On 10 January 2019, the USAF took delivery of the first KC-46, well past the original 2016 delivery date, albeit with two issues outstanding and funds withheld. The two outstanding issues were inadequate boom pressure when refueling the A-10 and glare induced distortion under certain conditions in the remote vision system (RVS). The USAF acknowledged that they failed to give Boeing adequate specifications for the A-10. At milestone C, Boeing gave the USAF a boom design that used the international standard of 1400 lbs of thrust resistance, which they accepted, but the A-10 is only able to generate 650 lbs.

On 25 January 2019, the 22d Air Refueling Wing at McConnell AFB received its first two KC-46As (15-46009 and 17-46031). In February 2019, the 97th Air Mobility Wing at Altus AFB received its first KC-46.

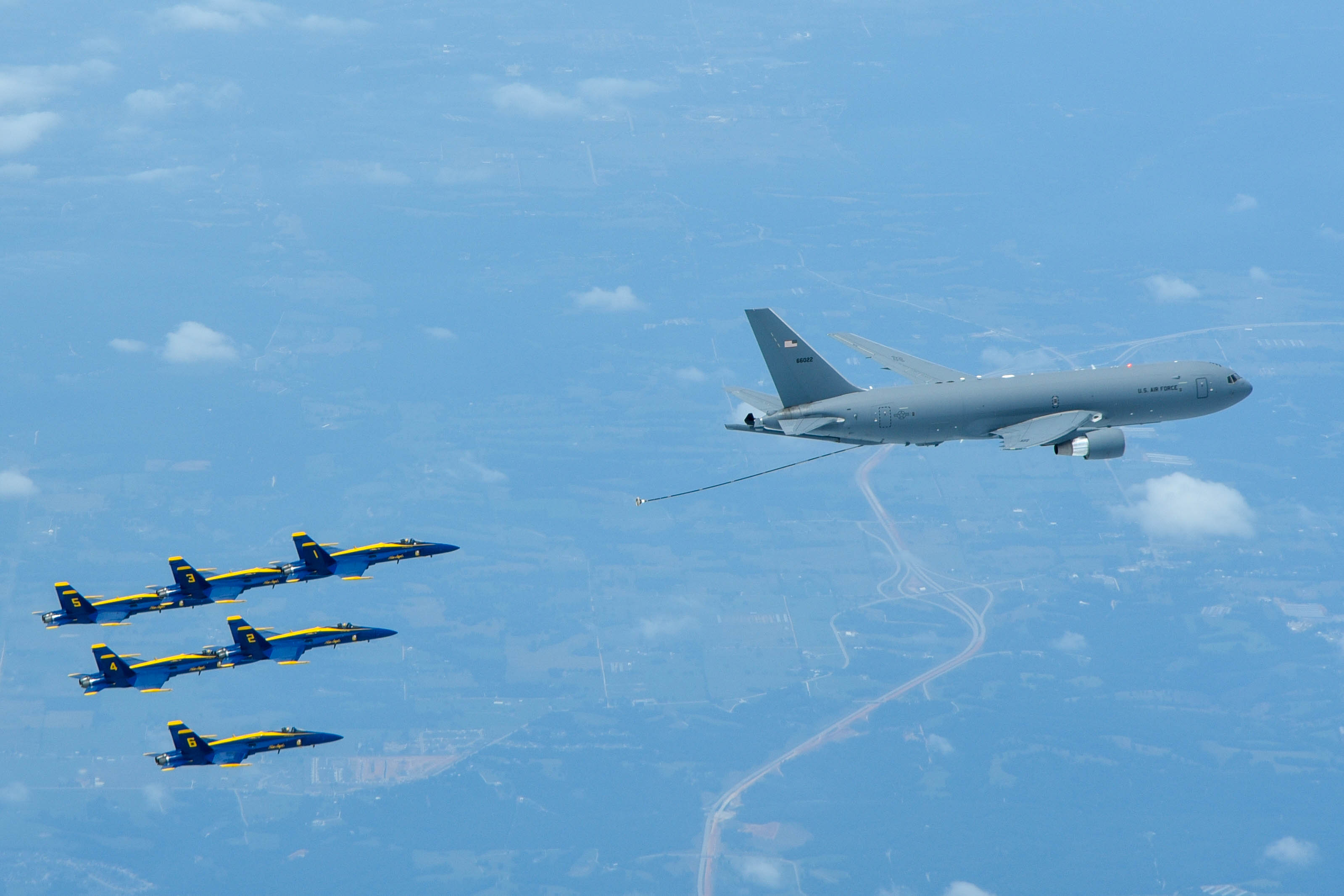
A KC-46 preparing to refuel the Navy Blue Angels over South Dakota, July 2020

In April 2019, it was confirmed that the USAF halted all deliveries on 23 March and until further notification, as loose material and debris were found in planes already delivered.

In August 2019, the 157th Air Refueling Wing at Pease Air National Guard Base received its first KC-46A.

In September 2019, the USAF restricted the KC-46 from carrying cargo and passengers due to an issue with the floor cargo locks unlocking mid-flight. A fix was approved by the USAF in November 2019 and were retrofitted upon delivered aircraft. By 20 December 2019, four KC-46As had received new cargo locks and the USAF had closed the Category 1 deficiency and cleared retrofitted aircraft for cargo and passenger operations.

In June 2020, the 916th Air Refueling Wing at Seymour Johnson Air Force Base received its first KC-46A. By January 2021, Boeing had delivered 42 KC-46As to the USAF and was on contract for 94 tankers.

In early 2021, the USAF cleared the KC-46 for limited operational use. The type can conduct U.S.-based refueling only, requiring other tankers for deployments to combat areas. At the time, the KC-46 could refuel the B-52, F-15, F-16, and F/A-18, but it was not approved to service the A-10, F-22, F-35, B-1, or B-2. It was expected to be fully combat-ready by 2023.

During September 2022, the USAF approved the KC-46 for general operational use, closing out a 15-month evaluation period.

In June 2024 the USAF completed a 45 hour non-stop flight around the globe as part of Project Magellan. The flight, which took off and landed at McConnell Air Force Base, was refueled several times while it refueled other operational aircraft at various places around the world.

On 28 February 2026, KC-46s were deployed to Israel and provided aerial refueling support during Operation Epic Fury, a large-scale joint US-Israeli military operation against Iran. The U.S. deployed KC-46 and KC-135 tankers alongside F-22 fighters to Israel in advance of the strikes. An Iranian ballistic missile and drone attack on Prince Sultan Air Base in Saudi Arabia left multiple US aircraft destroyed or damaged, including allegedly at least one KC-46.

=== Israel ===
In March 2020, the State Department approved the Foreign Military Sale to Israel of eight KC-46s and related equipment for a cost of $2.4 billion (~$2.94 billion in 2025). In February 2022, the U.S. and Israel signed an agreement to supply KC-46s to replace Israel's aging tanker fleet. In September 2022, Boeing announced Israel had purchased four KC-46s; the contract includes provisions for up to four more KC-46s. In April 2026, the Israeli Ministry of Defense announced that the first KC-46 Gideon out of six purchased so far had made its maiden flight in the US. On Aug 2026, the IAF received its second KC-46.

=== Japan ===
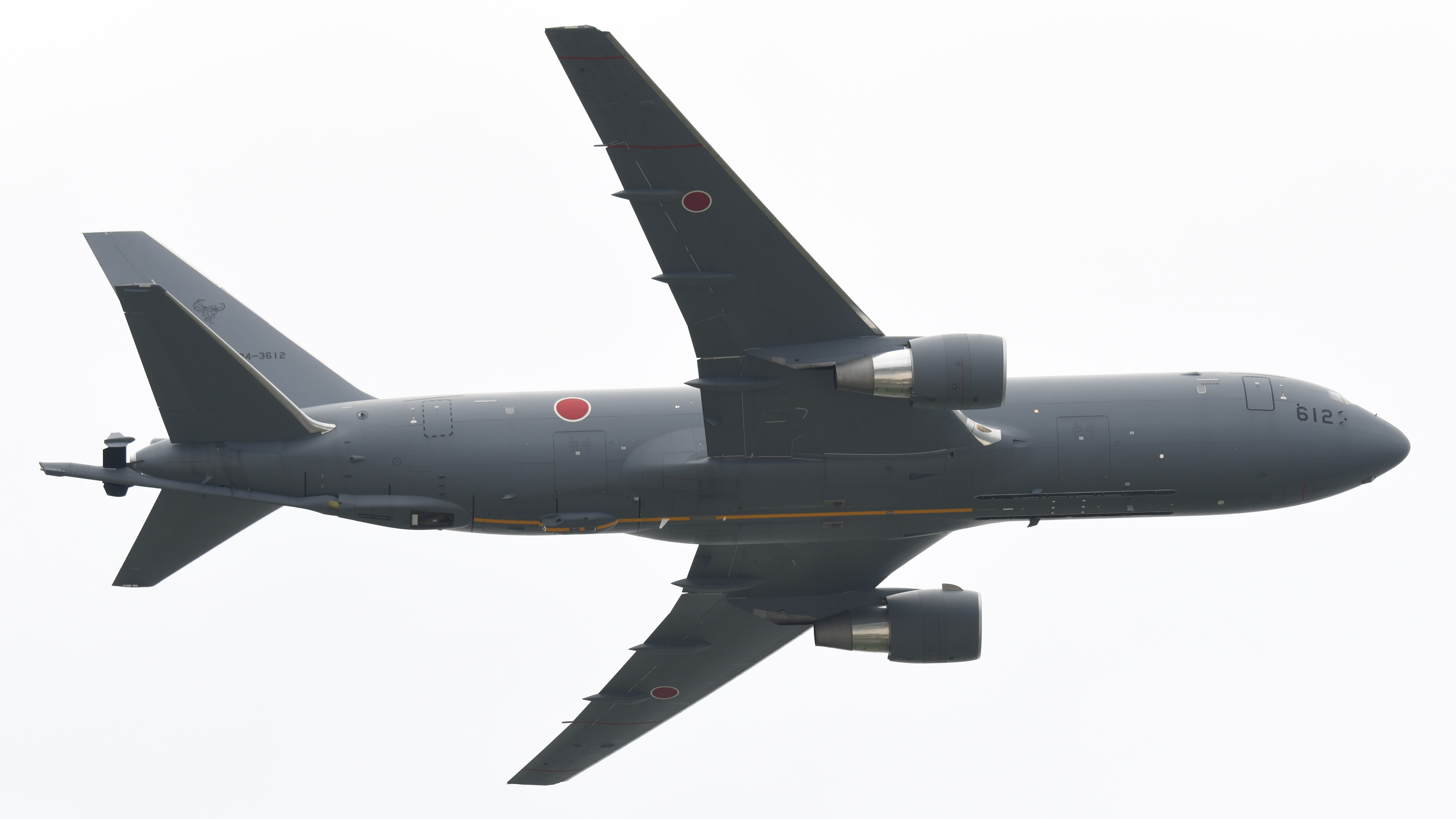
Japanese KC-46 in 2023

The Japan Air Self-Defense Force (JASDF) operates four of the earlier Boeing KC-767 tankers that were delivered from 2008 to 2010. In October 2015, Japan selected the KC-46, with a contract for three tankers expected in 2016. The decision allows for common operations and training with the USAF. Japan was reportedly attracted to its capability to refuel MV-22 Osprey tiltrotors, which the JASDF is to receive. Airbus declined to bid its A330 MRTT as they viewed Japan's request for proposals as intended for the KC-46.

The three tankers were to be fielded around 2020 at a cost of more than ¥20.8 billion, about US$173 million (~$212 million in 2025) per aircraft. An order for a third and fourth KC-46 was placed in October 2020. Japan ordered two additional KC-46s in December 2022, bringing Japan's order total to six. In February 2021, the JASDF conducted its first KC-46 flight. Training of Japanese KC-46 pilots began in June 2021 and Japan received its first KC-46 in November 2021.

=== Export bids ===
==== Indonesia ====
In January 2018, Indonesian Air Force officials were reported as saying they were studying both the Airbus A330 MRTT and KC-46 tankers for a future modernization program, expected to take place after the current Airbus A400M Atlas program completes. The Indonesian Air Force was said to be comparing the tankers on compatibility with the force's current aircraft, life-cycle costs, interoperability with current and future assets, and potential funding and technology transfer options with state-owned aircraft manufacturer Indonesian Aerospace.

==== Turkey ====
In May 2025, it was reported that Turkey was in negotiations with both Boeing and Airbus regarding a potential replacement for its aging fleet of KC-135R Stratotankers. The Turkish Air Force is evaluating the KC-46A Pegasus and the Airbus A330 MRTT. An official from ASFAT, Turkey's military factory and shipyard management company, noted that each platform offers distinct advantages: the KC-46A aligns with Turkey's familiarity with U.S. Air Force maintenance practices, while the A330 MRTT provides broader aeromedical evacuation capabilities.

==== Qatar ====
On 20 August 2026, the United States Department of State approved a potential Foreign Military Sale to the Government of Qatar for four (4) KC-46A and related equipment, spare parts, training and support at a cost of $4.5 billion.

=== Failed bids ===
==== Canada ====
In February 2017, Boeing stated it would bid the KC-46A for the Royal Canadian Air Force's Strategic Tanker Transport Capability competition, which is to replace Canada's fleet of CC-150 Polaris tankers. The contract was valued at C$1.5+ billion. In April 2021, Airbus Defence and Space with its submission of the A330 MRTT was deemed the only qualified bidder to replace the CC-150.

==== India ====
On 25 January 2018, the Indian Air Force launched a Request for Information (RFI) after two earlier tenders were cancelled within a duration seven years. The responses were to be submitted within 30 March. While the No. 78 Squadron is based at Agra Air Force Station in the West, the new fleet will be stationed at Panagarh Air Force Station in the East. The RFI was sent to Boeing, Airbus and Ilyushin. However, as the document specified the requirement of two-engine aircraft with two-man cabin crew, Il-78MKI was disqualified. Both Boeing and Airbus responded to the request with KC-46 Pegasus and A330 MRTT, respectively. Reportedly, the tender following the RFI was expected to have 30 percent mandatory direct defense offset clause.

On 6 April 2022, Hindustan Aeronautics Limited (HAL) signed an agreement with Israel Aerospace Industries (IAI) to convert six Boeing 767 commercial airliners into Multi Mission Tanker Transport (MMTT) in India. However, Boeing has to grant permission for such a conversion.

==== Italy ====
In November 2022, it was reported that Italy was negotiating the purchase of six KC-46s, to be designated KC-767B locally, after deciding to forgo modernization work on the current fleet of four KC-767As. The purchase could have included logistics support for the KC-46A fleet for a period of five years. The total cost of the contract would have been approximately €1.12 billion. Italy's four KC-767As were to have been sold to Boeing.

In July 2024, Italy halted the KC-46 purchase due to "changed and unforeseen needs" and restarted the tanker procurement. In 2026, Italy ordered six A330MRTTs.

==== South Korea ====
In June 2014, Boeing submitted the KC-46 for the Republic of Korea Air Force's requirement for four aerial tankers. The KC-46 competed with the Airbus A330 MRTT. South Korea selected the Airbus A330 MRTT in June 2015.

==== Poland ====
Boeing pitched the KC-46 to the Polish Air Force for its tanker requirement. In December 2014, Airbus was awarded a contract for four A330 MRTTs from a consortium of Poland, the Netherlands, and Norway.

==== United Arab Emirates ====
In May 2019, according to Boeing, the United Arab Emirates made a formal request to procure three KC-46As. In November 2021, the United Arab Emirates ordered two more Airbus A330 MRTTs for a total of five.

== Operators ==
Israel

- Israeli Air Force – 2 aircraft delivered, 4 aircraft on order, out of 8 approved via FMS.

Japan

- Japan Air Self-Defense Force – 6 aircraft delivered. In September 2024, Japan was authorized by the U.S. State Department to purchase a further 9 aircraft, subject to a contract being signed.

United States

- United States Air Force – 107 aircraft delivered as of July 2026, out of 169 contracted orders and a planned fleet of 263.
  - Air Force Materiel Command
    - 412th Test Wing – Edwards AFB, California
      - 418th Flight Test Squadron
  - Air Education and Training Command
    - 97th Air Mobility Wing – Altus AFB, Oklahoma
      - 56th Air Refueling Squadron
  - Air Mobility Command
    - 22d Air Refueling Wing – McConnell AFB, Kansas
      - 344th Air Refueling Squadron
    - 60th Air Mobility Wing – Travis AFB, California
      - 6th Air Refueling Squadron
      - 9th Air Refueling Squadron
    - 305th Air Mobility Wing – McGuire AFB, New Jersey
      - 2nd Air Refueling Squadron
      - 32nd Air Refueling Squadron
      - 911th Air Refueling Squadron – Seymour Johnson AFB, North Carolina (active duty associate to the 916th Air Refueling Wing)
  - Air Force Reserve Command
    - 916th Air Refueling Wing – Seymour Johnson AFB, North Carolina
      - 77th Air Refueling Squadron
    - 349th Air Mobility Wing – Travis AFB, California
      - 70th Air Refueling Squadron
      - 79th Air Refueling Squadron
  - Air National Guard
    - 108th Wing (associate) – McGuire AFB, New Jersey
      - 141st Air Refueling Squadron
      - 170th Air Refueling Squadron
    - 157th Air Refueling Wing – Pease ANGB, New Hampshire
      - 133rd Air Refueling Squadron
    - 134th Air Refueling Wing – McGhee ANGB, Tennessee
      - 151st Air Refueling Squadron 8 planned from 2031

== Specifications ==
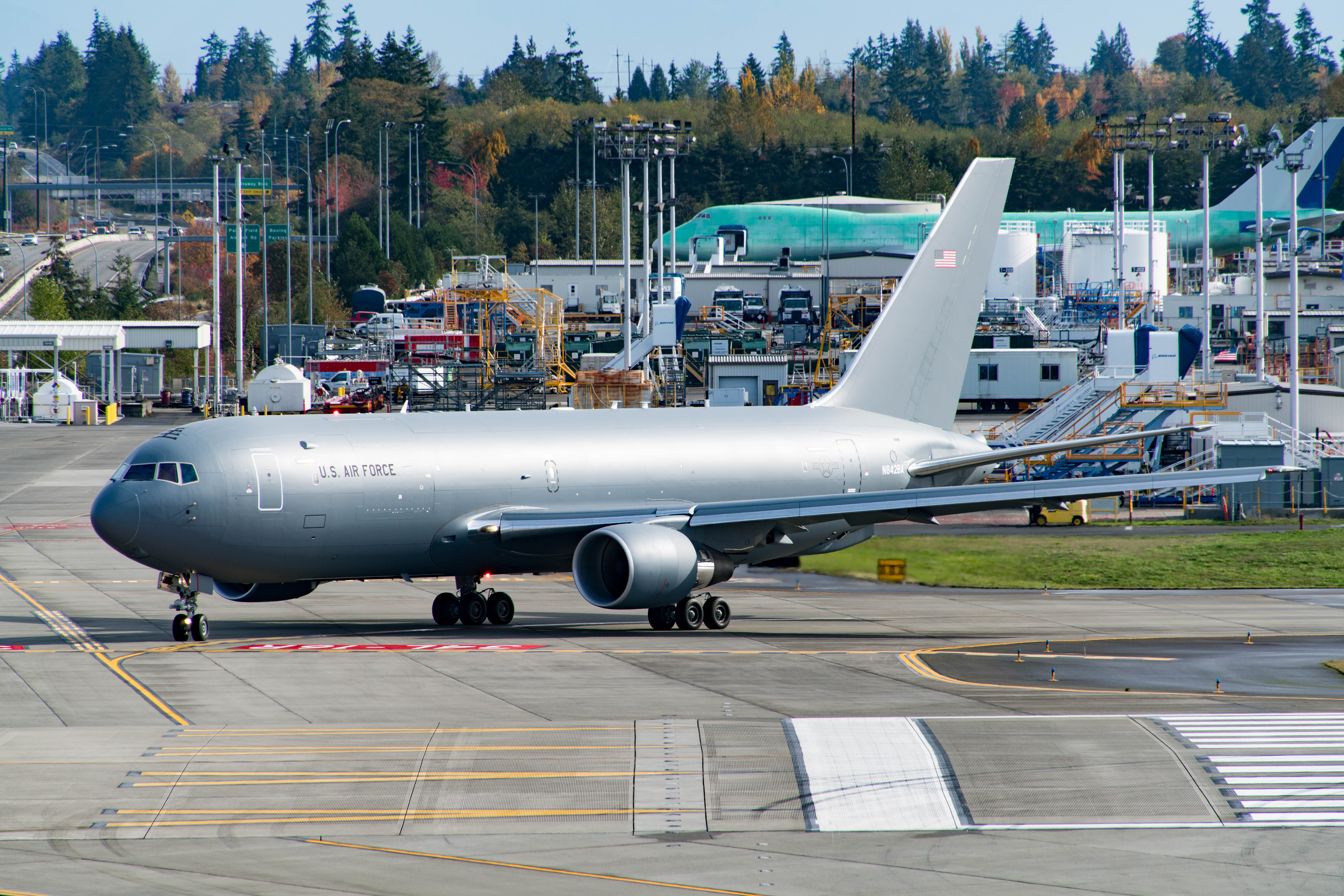
A KC-46A at Paine Field prior to its delivery to the USAF

Data from USAF KC-46A, Boeing KC-767, Boeing 767-200ER

General characteristics

- Crew: 3 (2 pilots, 1 boom operator) basic crew; 15 permanent seats for additional crew members, including aeromedical evacuation crew members
- Capacity: 65,000 lb (29,500 kg) payload, configurable as: seating for up to 54 passengers (up to 114 in contingencies), up to 18 463L pallets, or up to 58 patients (24 litters, 34 ambulatory)
- Length: 165 ft 6 in (50.5 m)
- Wingspan: 157 ft 8 in (48.1 m)
- Height: 52 ft 1 in (15.9 m)
- Empty weight: 181,610 lb (82,377 kg)
- Max takeoff weight: 415,000 lb (188,240 kg)
- Fuel Capacity: 212,299 lb (96,297 kg) / 31,220 US gal (118,200 L; 26,000 imp gal)
- Maximum Fuel Available for Transfer: 207,672 lb (94,198 kg)
- Powerplant: 2 × Pratt & Whitney PW4062 turbofan, 62,000 lbf (280 kN) thrust each

Performance

- Maximum speed: 570 mph (914 km/h, 500 kn)
- Cruise speed: 530 mph (851 km/h, 460 kn)
- Range: 7,350 mi (11,830 km, 6,385 nmi) – global with in flight refueling
- Service ceiling: 40,100 ft (12,200 m)

== See also ==
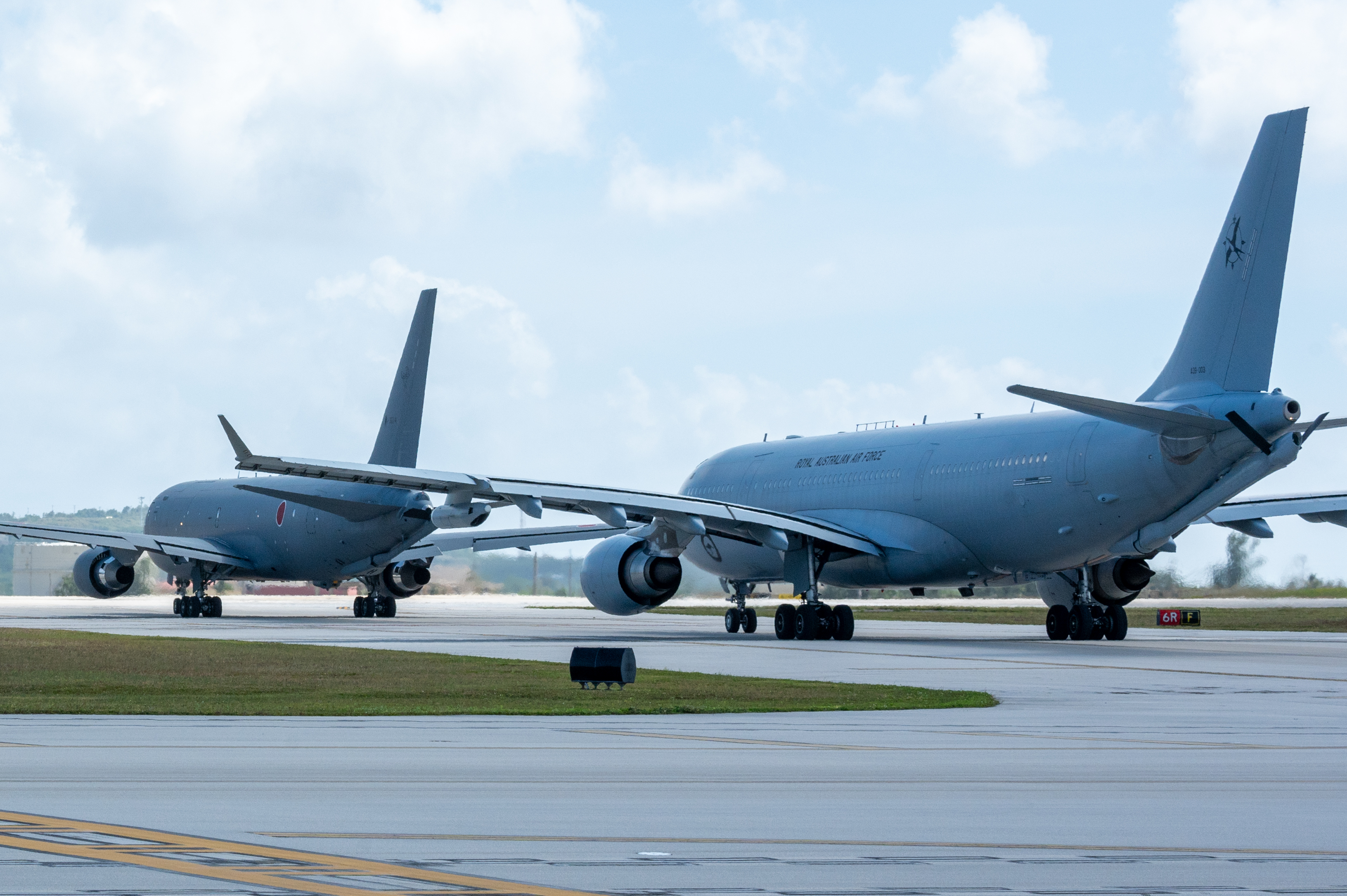
An Australian KC-30 following a Japanese KC-46 at Andersen AFB.

Related development

- Boeing 767
- Boeing E-767
- Boeing KC-767
- Northrop Grumman E-10 MC2A

Aircraft of comparable role, configuration, and era

- Airbus A310 MRTT
- Airbus A330 MRTT
- EADS/Northrop Grumman KC-45
- Ilyushin Il-96-400TZ

Related lists

- List of tanker aircraft
- List of United States military aerial refueling aircraft
