= KC-X =

US Defense department procurement program for next-generation tanker aircraft

KC-X program
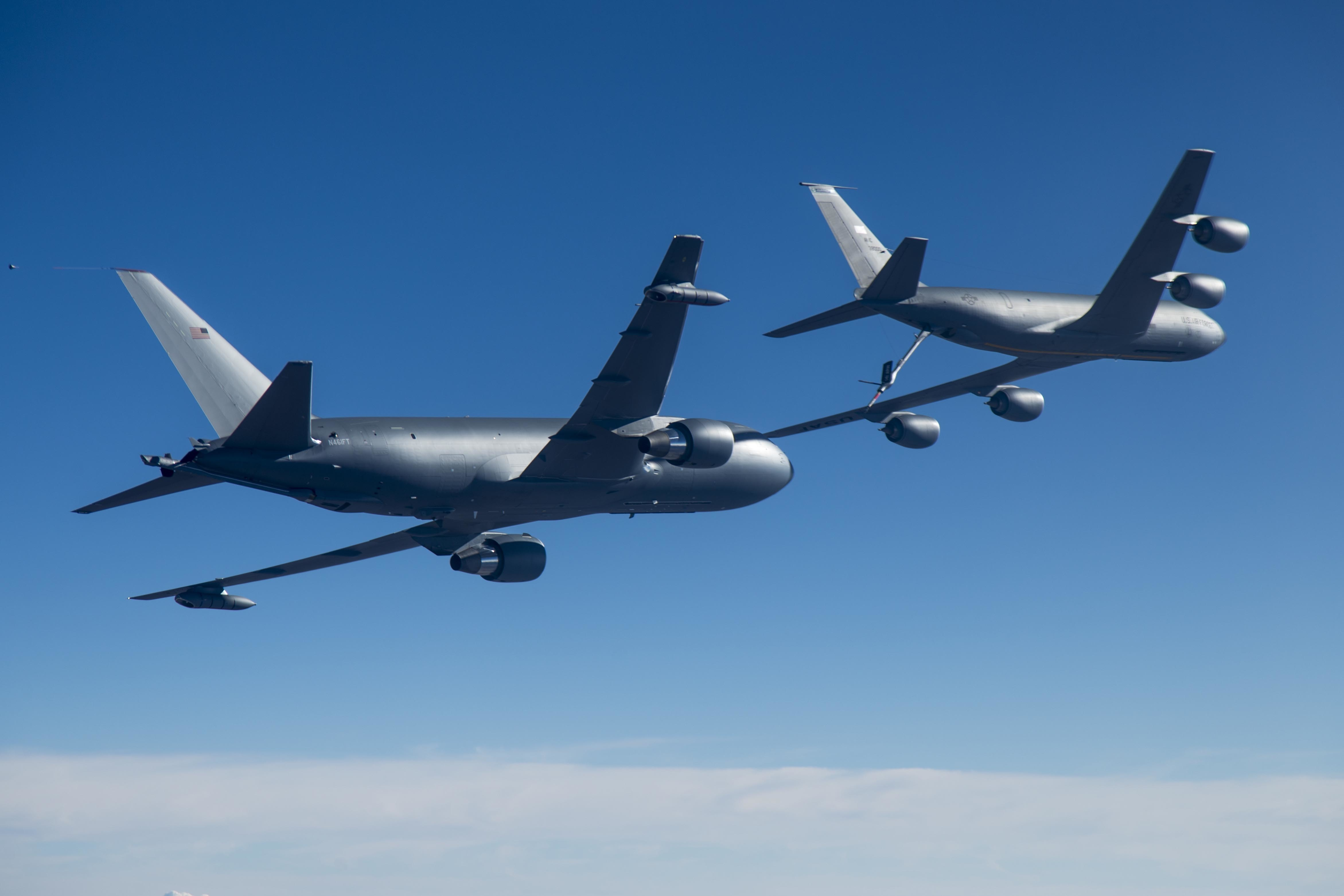
- A KC-135 refueling its eventual successor, KC-46.

General information
- Project for: Aerial refueling tanker aircraft
- Issued by: United States Air Force
- Proposals: Airbus A330 MRTT; Boeing KC-767; Antonov An-112KC
- Prototypes: Boeing KC-767; Airbus A330 MRTT

History
- Concluded: 2011
- Outcome: Round 1: EADS/Northrop Grumman KC-45 selected for production, but result protested Round 2: Boeing KC-46 Pegasus selected for production, no protest
- Predecessors: Commercial Derivative Air Refueling Aircraft

KC-X was the United States Air Force (USAF) program to procure its next-generation aerial refueling tanker aircraft to replace some of their older Boeing KC-135 Stratotankers. The contest was for a production contract for 179 new tankers with estimated value of US$35 billion. The two contenders to replace the KC-135 aircraft were Boeing and EADS, following the elimination of US Aerospace, Inc. from the bidding process.

The KC-X program followed earlier attempts by the USAF to procure a new tanker. A 2002 plan had the USAF leasing Boeing KC-767 tankers, followed by a 2003 modification where the USAF would buy most of the KC-767 aircraft and lease several more of them. Corruption investigations revealed wrongdoing in the award of the contract and the contract was canceled in 2005, setting the stage for the KC-X program.

The USAF issued the KC-X request for proposal in January 2007, then selected the Northrop Grumman/EADS team and their Airbus A330 MRTT-based tankers in February 2008. In June 2008, the U.S. Government Accountability Office sustained a protest by Boeing on the award of the contract. In July 2008, the U.S. Defense Department reopened the bidding process, but canceled the KC-X solicitation in September 2008. In September 2009, the USAF began the first steps toward accepting new bids. In March 2010, Northrop Grumman announced that it would pull out of the bidding process. Despite Northrop Grumman's withdrawal, EADS decided to remain in the ongoing competition alone. The Air Force selected Boeing's KC-46 bid on 24 February 2011.

== Background ==
The initial plan was to lease Boeing KC-767 tankers on a sole-source basis; Boeing is the only American company with the requisite industrial capability to manufacture large-body aircraft. As such, the KC-767 was selected in 2002 in 2003 Boeing was awarded a US$20 billion contract to lease KC-767 tankers to replace the KC-135.

Led by Senator John McCain, several US government leaders protested the lease contract as wasteful and problematic. In response to the protests, the Air Force struck a compromise in November 2003, whereby it would purchase 80 KC-767 aircraft and lease 20 more.

However, in December 2003, the Pentagon announced the project was to be frozen while an investigation of allegations of corruption by one of its former procurement staffers, Darleen Druyun (who had moved to Boeing in January 2003) was begun. Druyun pleaded guilty of criminal wrongdoing and was sentenced to nine months in prison for "negotiating a job with Boeing at the same time she was involved in contracts with the company". Additional fallout included the termination of CFO Michael M. Sears, who received a four-month prison sentence, the resignation of Boeing CEO Philip M. Condit, and Boeing paying $615 million in fines. In January 2006, the lease contract was formally canceled.

== Proposals ==
=== Initial competition ===
The USAF then began the KC-X tanker replacement program. The DoD posted a request for proposal on 30 January 2007. The U.S. Air Force's main requirements are "fuel offload and range at least as great as the KC-135", airlift capability, ability to take on fuel in flight, and multi-point refueling capability.

Two manufacturers expressed interest in producing this aircraft. The team of Northrop Grumman and EADS/Airbus proposed a version of the Airbus A330 Multi Role Tanker Transport (MRTT), based on the Airbus A330-200. Boeing proposed a version of the KC-767, based on the Boeing 767. The Seattle Times commented on the pre-final designs in February 2007: "Northrop has been viewed as the underdog, with a heavier, less fuel efficient aircraft. The Airbus tanker would have a maximum fuel capacity of 200,000 pounds. Northrop spokesman Randy Belote said Northrop's K-30 would tack on roughly 20 percent in fuel capacity."

Both competitors submitted their tanker proposals before 12 April 2007 deadline. In September 2007, the USAF dismissed having a mixed fleet of new tankers from both Boeing and Northrop Grumman as being unfeasible because of increased costs from buying limited numbers of two types annually. In December 2007, it was announced that the KC-X tanker would be designated KC-45A regardless of which design wins the competition. The DoD anticipated that the KC-45A would start to enter service in 2013.

On 3 January 2008, the competitors submitted final revisions of their proposals to the U.S. Air Force. On 29 February 2008, the DoD announced the selection of the Northrop Grumman/EADS's KC-30.

On 11 March 2008, Boeing filed a protest with the Government Accountability Office (GAO) of the award of the contract to the Northrop Grumman/EADS team. Boeing stated that there are certain aspects of the USAF evaluation process that have given it grounds to appeal. The protest was upheld by the GAO on 18 June 2008, which recommended that the Air Force rebid the contract.

=== Expedited recompetition ===
On 9 July 2008, the Defense Secretary Robert Gates put the tanker contract in an "expedited recompetition" with Defense Undersecretary John Young in charge of the selection process instead of the Air Force. A draft of the revised RFP was provided to the contractors on 6 August 2008 for comments with the revised RFP to be finalized by mid-August. Proposals would be due in October 2008 and selection was to be done by the end of 2008. In mid-August, there was speculation that Boeing was considering a "no bid" position. On 21 August 2008 Boeing asked the DoD for an additional four months to submit a proposal centered on a larger aircraft, but they opposed further delay. Then on 10 September 2008, Defense Secretary Robert Gates decided that the new competition could not be fairly completed before the end of 2008. The DoD canceled the request for proposals and delayed the decision on when to issue another request until the new presidential administration was in office.

=== Restarted competition ===
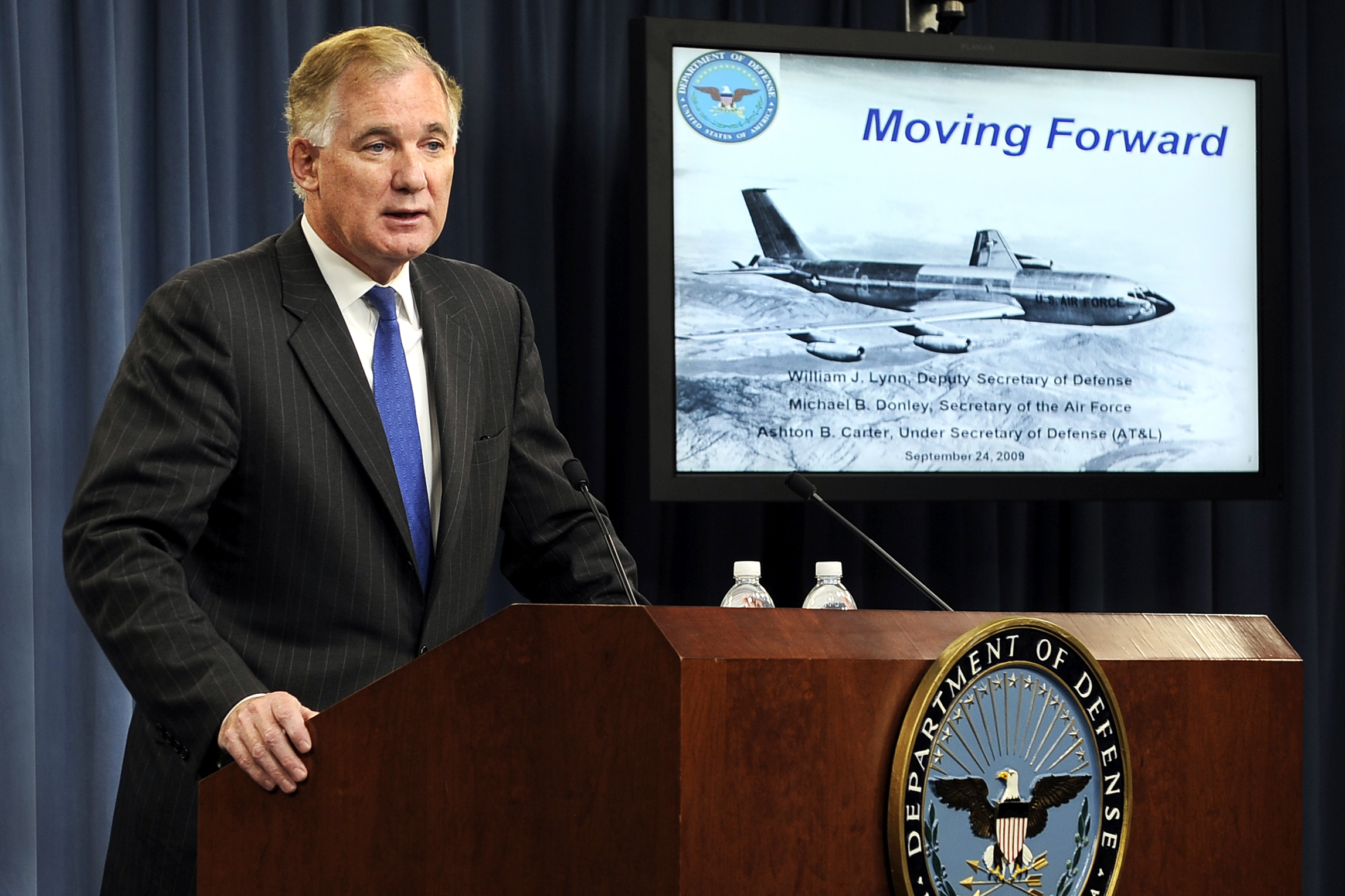
Deputy Secretary of Defense William Lynn, speaks about KC-X at a press conference at the Pentagon on 24 September 2009.

On 16 September 2009, Secretary Gates announced a renewed effort for the KC-X program. The selection process will be under the Air Force with a "robust oversight role" by the Office of the Secretary of Defense (OSD) to prevent a repeated failure. On 25 September 2009 the USAF issued a draft request for proposals (RFP) seeking comments for the official tanker replacement RFP. The RFP for a fixed-price contract specified 373 requirements for the new plane, and stated that the price of each tanker would be adjusted to reflect how much it would cost to operate over 40 years and how well it would meet various war-fighting needs. The initial contract would be for 179 aircraft for $35 billion. Northrop Grumman/EADS team claimed the requirement was advantaging Boeing and threatened to withdraw from the competition on 1 December 2009.

The fiscal 2011 Defense Department budget relegated $864 million in research and development money. A contract award was expected in summer 2010. On 24 February 2010, the US Air Force released the revised request for proposal (RFP) for KC-X. The RFP called for the KC-X tanker to first fly in 2012 and aircraft deliveries to begin in 2013.

On 8 March 2010, Northrop Grumman followed through with their earlier threat and decided to not submit a bid for the KC-X tanker stating that they believed the new evaluation methodology favored Boeing's smaller tanker. EADS, however announced on 20 April 2010, that it was re-entering the competition on a stand-alone basis and intended to bid the KC-30 with final assembly to take place in Mobile, Alabama as planned under its prior teaming arrangement with Northrop Grumman. On 18 June 2010, the USAF announced that the decision would be delayed until November 2010.

On 1 July 2010, a surprise third bidder, consisting of the team of US Aerospace and the Ukrainian manufacturer Antonov announced its intention to bid in the competition. The two firms announced that they would be interested in supplying up to three types of aircraft to the United States Air Force. The types reportedly being offered were the four-engined An-124 and a twin-engined variant of the aircraft, the An-122. The third aircraft to be offered was known as the An-112. The An-112 tanker is a version of the Antonov An-70, except with two jet engines. This tanker was proposed in the team's bid.

By 9 July 2010 bids from Boeing, EADS and US Aerospace/Antonov were submitted to the Air Force. However, the Air Force rejected the US Aerospace bid for allegedly arriving five minutes after the deadline, which US Aerospace disputed. US Aerospace filed separate protests with the U.S. Government Accountability Office (GAO) on 2 August and 1 September. The U.S. Air Force proceeded with source selection while GAO investigated. The GAO dismissed U.S. Aerospace's protest on 6 October.

In November 2010, the USAF mistakenly sent technical reviews of the other side's bids to each of the two remaining teams. At this time contract selection was postponed from late December 2010 until early 2011.

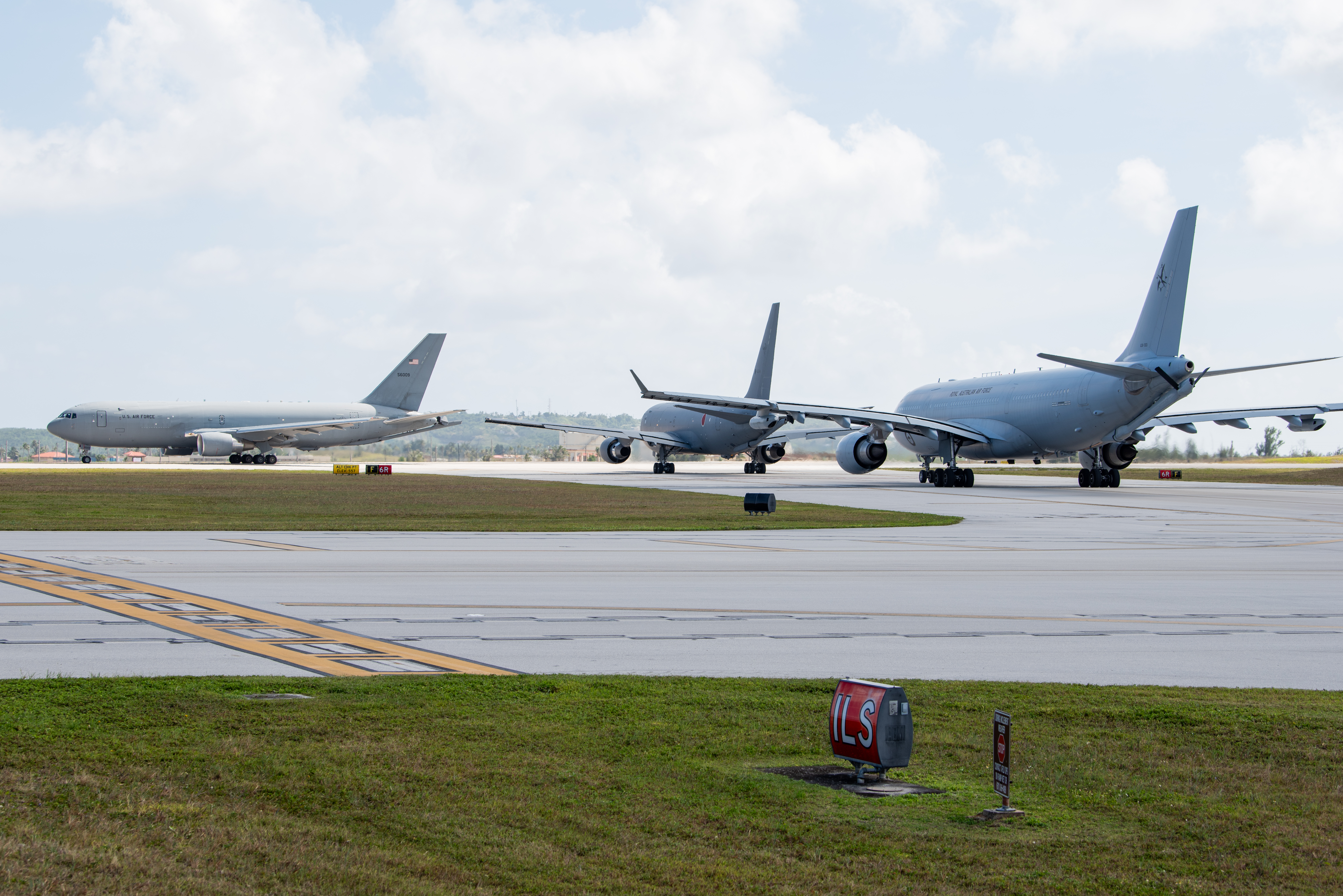
Boeing KC-46 Pegasus of USAF and JASDF alongside an Airbus A330 MRTT of RAAF, which operates the aircraft under the KC-30 designation. The KC-30/A330 MRTT was the basis for the proposed KC-45.

Boeing and EADS submitted their final bids on 10 February 2011. On 24 February 2011, Boeing's KC-767 proposal was selected as the winning offer. The tanker will be designated the KC-46A. EADS North America chairman Ralph Crosby declined to protest the award saying that Boeing's bid was "very, very, very aggressive" and carried a high risk of losing money for the company. Loren B. Thompson of the Lexington Institute agreed that Boeing's bid was very aggressive due to the Air Force's fixed-price contract strategy.

== Projected follow-on programs ==
- KC-Y Bridge Tanker Competition to replace KC-10 and "bridge the gap" between the KC-X and the KC-Z. Contenders: KC-46 and Airbus A330 MRTT/Lockheed Martin LMXT. In October 2023, Lockheed Martin withdrew, leaving Airbus to make the bid alone.
- KC-Z Next Generation Air-refueling System (NGAS) to replace KC-135Rs with possible stealth characteristics

== Specifications ==
There were three different bids proposed in July 2010. EADS proposed the Airbus A330 MRTT/KC-30, Boeing proposed the KC-767, while the Antonov/US Aerospace team's bid was the An-112KC.

Specifications of KC-135 and tendered replacements
	KC-135R	A330 MRTT / KC-30	KC-767 Advanced Tanker (based on 767-200LRF)	An-112KC
Length	136 ft 3 in (41.5 m)	192 ft 11 in (58.8 m)	159 ft 2 in (48.5 m)	131 ft 5 in (40.1 m)
Height	41 ft 8 in (12.7 m)	57 ft 1 in (17.4 m)	52 ft (15.8 m)	53 ft 2 in (16.2 m)
Wingspan	130 ft 10 in (39.9 m)	197 ft 10 in (60.3 m)	156 ft 1 in (47.6 m)	166 ft 2 in (50.6 m)
Fuselage width	12 ft (3.66 m)	18 ft 6 in (5.64 m)	16 ft 6 in (5.03 m)	17 ft 1 in (5.21 m)
Fuselage height	14 ft (4.27 m)	18 ft 6 in (5.64 m)	17 ft 9 in (5.41 m)	–
Engines	4 x CFM International CFM56	2 x Pratt & Whitney PW4170, RR Trent 700 or GE CF6-80 turbofans	2 x Pratt & Whitney PW4062	2 x Engine Alliance GP7277 or Rolls-Royce Trent 972B- 84
Thrust	4 x 21,634 lbf (96.2 kN)	2 x 72,000 lbf (320 kN)	2 x 63,500 lbf (282 kN)	–
Passengers	80	226–280	190	300
Cargo	6 x 463L pallets	32 x 463L pallets	19 x 463L pallets	8 pallets
Maximum fuel capability	200,000 lb (90,700 kg)	250,000 lb (113,000 kg)	greater than 202,000 lb (91,600 kg)	139,000 lb (63,000 kg)
Max. takeoff fuel load	Approximately 200,000 lb (90,700 kg)	245,000 lb (111,000 kg)	greater than 202,000 lb (91,600 kg)	139,000 lb (63,000 kg)
Range	11,015 nmi (12,680 mi; 20,400 km)	6,750 nmi (7,768 mi; 12,500 km)	6,590 nmi (7,584 mi; 12,200 km)	6,800 nmi (7,825 mi; 12,590 km)
Cruise speed	Mach 0.79 (530 mph or 853 km/h)	Mach 0.82 (534 mph or 859 km/h)	Mach 0.80 (530 mph or 853 km/h)	–
Maximum speed	Mach 0.90 (600 mph or 966 km/h)	Mach 0.86 (570 mph or 917 km/h)	Mach 0.86 (570 mph or 917 km/h)	–
Max. takeoff weight	322,500 lb (146,300 kg)	507,000 lb (230,000 kg)	greater than 400,000 lb (180,000 kg)	364,000 lb (165,000 kg)
Max. landing weight	322,500 lb (146,300 kg), normally 200,000 lb (91,000 kg)	396,800 lb (180,000 kg)	300,000 lb (140,000 kg)	–
Empty weight	approx. 122,000 lb (55,000 kg)	263,700 lb (119,600 kg)	181,600 lb (82,400 kg)	164,000 lb (74,000 kg)

== See also ==
- Future Strategic Tanker Aircraft competition for British replacement aircraft
- McDonnell Douglas KC-10 Extender from the Advanced Tanker Cargo Aircraft Program, with a similar role, but with a greater fuel capacity
- List of United States military aerial refueling aircraft
