= April 26 =

April 26 this year in various calendars
- Sunday, 26 April 2026
Other calendars
Armenian	10 Mareri 1475
Aztec	Xocotlhuetzi 6, 3 Ocēlōtl
Babylonian	8 Nisanu, 2337 SE
Balinese pawukon	Menga, Pasah, Laba, Pon, Paniron, Redite of Kulantir, Brahma, Dangu, Suka
Bengali	7 Bhadro, BS 1433
Chinese	Yang Metal Horse・Star Mansion -108 Qīyuè, Bǐngwǔnián (Guyu, 9 days until Lixia)
Common Era	26 April 2026 CE
Coptic	18 Parmouti, AM 1742
Egyptian	10 Thoth, 2775 NE
Ethiopian	18 Miyāzyā, 2018 Amätä Məhrät
French Republican	Décade I, Septidi de Floréal de l'Année 234 de la République
Gregorian	26 April, AD 2026
Hebrew	9 Iyar, AM 5786; Omer 24
Icelandic	Sunnudagur, 4 Harpa 2026
Islamic	9 Dhu al-Qi'dah, AH 1447 (using tabular method)
ISO week date	2026-W17-7
Japanese	10 Yayoi, Reiwa 8 (Kokuu, 9 days until Rikka)
Julian	13 April, AD 2026 (AM 7534)
Julian day	2461157
Maya	13.0.13.9.14; 7 Uo, 3 Ix
Roman	Idibus Aprilibus, MMDCCLXXIX AUC
Solar Hijri	6 Ordibehesht, SH 1405

<<	April					>>
Su	Mo	Tu	We	Th	Fr	Sa
			1	2	3	4
5	6	7	8	9	10	11
12	13	14	15	16	17	18
19	20	21	22	23	24	25
26	27	28	29	30
2026

April 26 in recent years
2026 (Sunday)
2025 (Saturday)
2024 (Friday)
2023 (Wednesday)
2022 (Tuesday)
2021 (Monday)
2020 (Sunday)
2019 (Friday)
2018 (Thursday)
2017 (Wednesday)

April 26 is the 116th day of the year (117th in leap years) in the Gregorian calendar; 249 days remain until the end of the year.

== Events ==
=== Pre-1600 ===
- 1289 – Following weeks of bombardment, the city of Tripoli falls to the Mamluks under Qalawun. The Mamluks massacre all men they find and enslave the women and children.
- 1326 – The kingdom of France and the kingdom of Scotland agree on a treaty of mutual aid at Corbeil.
- 1336 – Francesco Petrarca (Petrarch) ascends Mont Ventoux.
- 1478 – The Pazzi family attack on Lorenzo de' Medici in order to displace the ruling Medici family kills his brother Giuliano during High Mass in Florence Cathedral.
- 1564 – Playwright William Shakespeare is baptized in Stratford-upon-Avon, Warwickshire, England (date of birth is unknown).

=== 1601–1900 ===
- 1607 – The Virginia Company colonists make landfall at Cape Henry.
- 1721 – A massive earthquake devastates the Iranian city of Tabriz.
- 1777 – Sybil Ludington, aged 16, allegedly rides 40 miles (64 km) to alert American colonial forces to the approach of British regular forces.
- 1794 – Battle of Beaumont during the Flanders Campaign of the War of the First Coalition.
- 1802 – Napoleon Bonaparte signs a general amnesty to allow all but about one thousand of the most notorious émigrés of the French Revolution to return to France.
- 1803 – Thousands of meteor fragments fall from the skies of L'Aigle, France; the event convinces European scientists that meteors exist.
- 1805 – First Barbary War: United States Marines capture Derne under the command of First Lieutenant Presley O'Bannon.
- 1865 – Union cavalry troopers corner and shoot dead John Wilkes Booth, assassin of President Abraham Lincoln, in Virginia.
- 1900 – Fires destroy Canadian cities Ottawa and Hull, reducing them to ashes in 12 hours. Twelve thousand people are left without a home.

=== 1901–present ===
- 1903 – Atlético Madrid Association football club is founded.
- 1915 – World War I: Italy secretly signs the Treaty of London pledging to join the Allied Powers.
- 1916 – Easter Rising: Battle of Mount Street Bridge.
- 1920 – Ice hockey makes its Olympic debut at the Antwerp Games with center Frank Fredrickson scoring seven goals in Canada's 12–1 drubbing of Sweden in the gold medal match.
- 1923 – The Duke of York (the future King George VI) weds Lady Elizabeth Bowes-Lyon at Westminster Abbey.
- 1925 – Paul von Hindenburg defeats Wilhelm Marx in the second round of the German presidential election to become the first directly elected head of state of the Weimar Republic.
- 1933 – The Gestapo, the official secret police force of Nazi Germany, is established by Hermann Göring.
- 1937 – Spanish Civil War: Guernica, Spain, is bombed by the German Condor Legion and the Italian Aviazione Legionaria.
- 1942 – Benxihu Colliery accident in Manchukuo leaves 1,549 Chinese miners dead.
- 1943 – The Easter Riots break out in Uppsala, Sweden.
- 1944 – Georgios Papandreou becomes head of the Greek government-in-exile based in Egypt.
- 1944 – World War II: Heinrich Kreipe is captured by Allied commandos in occupied Crete.
- 1945 – World War II: Battle of Bautzen: Last successful German tank-offensive of the war and last noteworthy victory of the Wehrmacht.
- 1945 – World War II: Filipino troops of the 66th Infantry Regiment, Philippine Commonwealth Army, USAFIP-NL and the American troops of the 33rd and 37th Infantry Division, United States Army liberate Baguio as they fight against the Japanese forces under General Tomoyuki Yamashita.
- 1954 – The Geneva Conference, an effort to restore peace in Indochina and Korea, begins.
- 1954 – The first clinical trials of Jonas Salk's polio vaccine begin in Fairfax County, Virginia.
- 1956 – SS Ideal X, the world's first successful container ship, leaves Port Newark, New Jersey, for Houston, Texas.
- 1958 – Final run of the Baltimore and Ohio Railroad's Royal Blue from Washington, D.C., to New York City after 68 years, the first U.S. passenger train to use electric locomotives.
- 1960 – Forced out by the April Revolution, President of South Korea Syngman Rhee resigns after 12 years of dictatorial rule.
- 1962 – NASA's Ranger 4 spacecraft crashes into the Moon.
- 1962 – The British space programme launches its first satellite, the Ariel 1.
- 1963 – In Libya, amendments to the constitution transform Libya (United Kingdom of Libya) into one national unity (Kingdom of Libya) and allow for female participation in elections.
- 1964 – Tanganyika and Zanzibar merge to form the United Republic of Tanzania.
- 1966 – The magnitude 5.1 Tashkent earthquake affects the largest city in Soviet Central Asia with a maximum MSK intensity of VII (Very strong). Tashkent is mostly destroyed and 15–200 are killed.
- 1966 – A new government is formed in the Republic of the Congo, led by Ambroise Noumazalaye.
- 1970 – The Convention Establishing the World Intellectual Property Organization enters into force.
- 1981 – Dr. Michael R. Harrison of the University of California, San Francisco Medical Center performs the world's first human open fetal surgery.
- 1986 – The Chernobyl disaster occurs in the Ukrainian Soviet Socialist Republic.
- 1989 – The deadliest known tornado strikes Central Bangladesh, killing upwards of 1,300, injuring 12,000, and leaving as many as 80,000 homeless.
- 1989 – People's Daily publishes the April 26 Editorial which inflames the nascent Tiananmen Square protests.
- 1991 – Fifty-five tornadoes break out in the central United States. Before the outbreak's end, Andover, Kansas, would record the year's only F5 tornado.
- 1993 – The Space Shuttle Columbia is launched on mission STS-55 to conduct experiments aboard the Spacelab module.
- 1994 – China Airlines Flight 140 crashes at Nagoya Airport in Japan, killing 264 of the 271 people on board.
- 1994 – South Africa begins its first multiracial election, which is won by Nelson Mandela's African National Congress.
- 1999 – Outbreak of CIH computer virus.
- 2002 – Robert Steinhäuser kills 16 at Gutenberg-Gymnasium in Erfurt, Germany, before committing suicide.
- 2005 – Cedar Revolution: Under international pressure, Syria withdraws the last of its 14,000 troop military garrison in Lebanon, ending its 29-year military domination of that country (Syrian occupation of Lebanon).
- 2015 – Nursultan Nazarbayev is re-elected President of Kazakhstan with 97.7% of the vote, one of the biggest vote shares in Kazakhstan's history.
- 2015 – Peaceful protesters install the first anti-monument in Mexico, Antimonumento +43, as a call for justice and remembrance to commemorate the 2014 Iguala mass kidnapping, later inspiring similar memorials elsewhere in the country and Latin America.
- 2025 – A car ramming attack at a Lapu-Lapu Day festival kills 11 people and injures at least 30 in Vancouver, Canada.

== Births ==
=== Pre-1600 ===
- 121 – Marcus Aurelius, Roman emperor (died 180)
- 757 – Hisham I of Córdoba (died 796)
- 764 – Al-Hadi, Abbasid caliph (died 786)
- 1284 – Alice de Toeni, Countess of Warwick (died 1324)
- 1319 – John II of France (died 1364)
- 1538 – Gian Paolo Lomazzo, Italian painter and academic (died 1600)
- 1575 – Marie de' Medici, wife of Henry IV of France (died 1642)

=== 1601–1900 ===
- 1647 – William Ashhurst, English banker, Sheriff of London, Lord Mayor of London and politician (died 1720)
- 1648 – Peter II of Portugal (died 1706)
- 1697 – Adam Falckenhagen, German lute player and composer (died 1754)
- 1710 – Thomas Reid, Scottish philosopher and academic (died 1796)
- 1718 – Esek Hopkins, American commander (died 1802)
- 1774 – Christian Leopold von Buch, German geologist and paleontologist (died 1853)
- 1782 – Maria Amalia of Naples and Sicily, Queen of France (died 1866)
- 1785 – John James Audubon, French-American ornithologist and painter (died 1851)
- 1787 – Ludwig Uhland, German poet, philologist, and historian (died 1862)
- 1798 – Eugène Delacroix, French painter and lithographer (died 1863)
- 1801 – Ambrose Dudley Mann, American politician and diplomat, 1st United States Assistant Secretary of State (died 1889)
- 1804 – Charles Goodyear, American banker, lawyer, and politician (died 1876)
- 1822 – Frederick Law Olmsted, American journalist and designer, co-designed Central Park (died 1903)
- 1834 – Charles Farrar Browne, American author (died 1867)
- 1856 – Joseph Ward, Australian-New Zealand businessman and politician, 17th Prime Minister of New Zealand (died 1930)
- 1862 – Edmund C. Tarbell, American painter and educator (died 1938)
- 1865 – Akseli Gallen-Kallela, Finnish artist (died 1931)
- 1876 – Ernst Felle, German rower (died 1959)
- 1877 – James Dooley, Irish-Australian politician, 21st Premier of New South Wales (died 1950)
- 1878 – Rafael Guízar y Valencia, Mexican bishop and saint (died 1938)
- 1879 – Eric Campbell, British actor (died 1917)
- 1879 – Owen Willans Richardson, English physicist and academic, Nobel Prize laureate (died 1959)
- 1886 – Ma Rainey, American singer-songwriter (died 1939)
- 1886 – Ğabdulla Tuqay, Russian poet and publicist (died 1913)
- 1889 – Anita Loos, American author, playwright, and screenwriter (died 1981)
- 1889 – Ludwig Wittgenstein, Austrian-English philosopher and academic (died 1951)
- 1894 – Rudolf Hess, German politician and Deputy Führer in Nazi regime until 1941 (died 1987)
- 1896 – Ruut Tarmo, Estonian actor and director (died 1967)
- 1896 – Ernst Udet, leading German fighter pilot in World War I and Chief of Procurement and Supply in the Luftwaffe (died 1941)
- 1897 – Eddie Eagan, American boxer and bobsledder (died 1967)
- 1897 – Douglas Sirk, German-American director and screenwriter (died 1987)
- 1898 – Vicente Aleixandre, Spanish poet and author, Nobel Prize laureate (died 1984)
- 1898 – John Grierson, Scottish director and producer (died 1972)
- 1899 – Oscar Rabin, Latvian-English saxophonist and bandleader (died 1958)
- 1900 – Eva Aschoff, German bookbinder and calligrapher (died 1969)
- 1900 – Charles Francis Richter, American seismologist and physicist (died 1985)
- 1900 – Hack Wilson, American baseball player (died 1948)

=== 1901–present ===
- 1904 – Paul-Émile Léger, Canadian cardinal (died 1991)
- 1904 – Xenophon Zolotas, Greek economist and politician, 177th Prime Minister of Greece (died 2004)
- 1905 – Jean Vigo, French director and screenwriter (died 1934)
- 1907 – Ilias Tsirimokos, Greek politician, Prime Minister of Greece (died 1968)
- 1909 – Marianne Hoppe, German actress (died 2002)
- 1910 – Tomoyuki Tanaka, Japanese screenwriter and producer (died 1997)
- 1911 – Paul Verner, German soldier and politician (died 1986)
- 1912 – A. E. van Vogt, Canadian-American author (died 2000)
- 1914 – Bernard Malamud, American novelist and short story writer (died 1986)
- 1914 – James Rouse, American real estate developer (died 1996)
- 1916 – Eyvind Earle, American artist, author, and illustrator (died 2000)
- 1916 – Ken Wallis, English commander, engineer, and pilot (died 2013)
- 1916 – Morris West, Australian author and playwright (died 1999)
- 1917 – Sal Maglie, American baseball player and coach (died 1992)
- 1917 – I. M. Pei, Chinese-American architect, designed the National Gallery of Art and Bank of China Tower (died 2019)
- 1917 – Virgil Trucks, American baseball player and coach (died 2013)
- 1918 – Fanny Blankers-Koen, Dutch sprinter and long jumper (died 2004)
- 1921 – Jimmy Giuffre, American clarinet player, saxophonist, and composer (died 2008)
- 1922 – J. C. Holt, English historian and academic (died 2014)
- 1922 – Jeanne Sauvé, Canadian journalist and politician, Governor General of Canada (died 1993)
- 1922 – Margaret Scott, South African-Australian ballerina and choreographer (died 2019)
- 1924 – Browning Ross, American runner and soldier (died 1998)
- 1925 – Vladimir Boltyansky, Russian mathematician, educator and author (died 2019)
- 1925 – Gerard Cafesjian, American businessman and philanthropist (died 2013)
- 1925 – Michele Ferrero, Italian entrepreneur (died 2015)
- 1925 – Frank Hahn, British economist (died 2013)
- 1926 – David Coleman, British sports commentator and television presenter (died 2013)
- 1926 – Michael Mathias Prechtl, German soldier and illustrator (died 2003)
- 1927 – Jack Douglas, English actor (died 2008)
- 1927 – Anne McLaren, British scientist (died 2007)
- 1927 – Harry Gallatin, American basketball player and coach (died 2015)
- 1927 – Granny Hamner, American baseball player (died 1993)
- 1929 – Richard Mitchell, American author and educator (died 2002)
- 1930 – Roger Moens, Belgian runner and sportscaster
- 1931 – Paul Almond, Canadian director, producer, and screenwriter (died 2015)
- 1931 – Bernie Brillstein, American talent agent and producer (died 2008)
- 1931 – John Cain Jr., Australian politician, 41st Premier of Victoria (died 2019)
- 1932 – Israr Ahmed, Indian-Pakistani theologian, philosopher, and scholar (died 2010)
- 1932 – Shirley Cawley, English long jumper
- 1932 – Frank D'Rone, American singer and guitarist (died 2013)
- 1932 – Francis Lai, French accordion player and composer (died 2018)
- 1932 – Michael Smith, English-Canadian biochemist and geneticist, Nobel Prize laureate (died 2000)
- 1933 – Carol Burnett, American actress, singer, and producer
- 1933 – Al McCoy, American sports announcer (died 2024)
- 1933 – Filiberto Ojeda Ríos, Puerto Rican-American general (died 2005)
- 1933 – Arno Allan Penzias, German-American physicist and academic, Nobel Prize laureate (died 2024)
- 1937 – Jean-Pierre Beltoise, French racing driver and motorcycle racer (died 2015)
- 1938 – Duane Eddy, American singer-songwriter, guitarist, and actor (died 2024)
- 1938 – Maurice Williams, American doo-wop/R&B singer-songwriter
- 1940 – Giorgio Moroder, Italian singer-songwriter and producer
- 1940 – Cliff Watson, English rugby league player (died 2018)
- 1940 – Tan Cheng Bock, Singaporean doctor and politician
- 1941 – Claudine Auger, French model and actress (died 2019)
- 1942 – Svyatoslav Belza, Russian journalist, author, and critic (died 2014)
- 1942 – Sharon Carstairs, Canadian lawyer and politician, Leader of the Government in the Senate
- 1942 – Michael Kergin, Canadian diplomat, Canadian Ambassador to the United States
- 1942 – Bobby Rydell, American singer and actor (died 2022)
- 1942 – Jadwiga Staniszkis, Polish sociologist, political scientist, and academic (died 2024)
- 1943 – Gary Wright, American singer-songwriter, keyboard player, and producer (died 2023)
- 1943 – Peter Zumthor, Swiss architect and academic, designed the Therme Vals
- 1944 – Richard Bradshaw, English conductor (died 2007)
- 1945 – Richard Armitage, American diplomat and government official (died 2025)
- 1945 – Howard Davies, English director and producer (died 2016)
- 1945 – Dick Johnson, Australian racing driver
- 1945 – Sylvain Simard, Canadian academic and politician
- 1946 – Ralph Coates, English international footballer (died 2010)
- 1946 – Marilyn Nelson, American poet and author
- 1946 – Alberto Quintano, Chilean footballer
- 1949 – Carlos Bianchi, Argentinian footballer and manager
- 1949 – Jerry Blackwell, American wrestler (died 1995)
- 1950 – Junko Ohashi, Japanese singer (died 2023)
- 1951 – John Battle, English politician
- 1954 – Tatyana Fomina, Estonian chess player
- 1954 – Alan Hinkes, English mountaineer and explorer
- 1955 – Kurt Bodewig, German politician
- 1956 – Koo Stark, American actress and photographer
- 1958 – John Crichton-Stuart, 7th Marquess of Bute, Scottish racing driver (died 2021)
- 1958 – Giancarlo Esposito, American actor, director, and producer
- 1958 – Georgios Kostikos, Greek footballer, coach, and manager
- 1959 – John Corabi, American singer-songwriter and guitarist
- 1959 – Pedro Pierluisi, Puerto Rican politician
- 1960 – H. G. Carrillo, American writer and academic (died 2020)
- 1960 – Steve Lombardozzi, American baseball player and coach
- 1960 – Roger Taylor, English drummer
- 1961 – Joan Chen, Chinese-American actress, director, producer, and screenwriter
- 1961 – Chris Mars, American artist
- 1962 – Colin Anderson, English footballer
- 1962 – Debra Wilson, American actress and comedian
- 1963 – Jet Li, Chinese-Singaporean martial artist, actor, and producer
- 1963 – Colin Scotts, Australian-American football player
- 1963 – Cornelia Ullrich, German hurdler
- 1963 – Bill Wennington, Canadian basketball player
- 1965 – Susannah Harker, English actress
- 1965 – Kevin James, American actor and comedian
- 1967 – Glenn Thomas Jacobs, American professional wrestler, actor, businessman and politician
- 1967 – Marianne Jean-Baptiste, English actress and singer-songwriter
- 1967 – Toomas Tõniste, Estonian sailor and politician
- 1970 – Dean Austin, English footballer and manager
- 1970 – Melania Trump, Slovene-American model; 47th First Lady of the United States
- 1970 – Kristen R. Ghodsee, American ethnographer and academic
- 1970 – Tionne "T-Boz" Watkins, American singer-songwriter, dancer, and actress
- 1971 – Naoki Tanaka, Japanese comedian and actor
- 1971 – Jay DeMarcus, American bass player, songwriter, and producer
- 1972 – Jason Bargwanna, Australian racing driver
- 1972 – Kiko, Spanish footballer
- 1972 – Natrone Means, American football player and coach
- 1972 – Avi Nimni, Israeli footballer and manager
- 1973 – Geoff Blum, American baseball player and sportscaster
- 1973 – Jules Naudet, French-American director and producer
- 1973 – Chris Perry, English footballer
- 1973 – Óscar, Spanish footballer and coach
- 1975 – Joey Jordison, American musician and songwriter (died 2021)
- 1975 – Rahul Verma, Indian social worker and activist
- 1976 – Václav Varaďa, Czech ice hockey player
- 1977 – Samantha Cristoforetti, Italian astronaut
- 1977 – Kosuke Fukudome, Japanese baseball player
- 1977 – Roxana Saberi, American journalist and author
- 1977 – Tom Welling, American actor
- 1978 – Stana Katic, Canadian actress
- 1978 – Peter Madsen, Danish footballer
- 1980 – Jordana Brewster, Panamanian-American actress
- 1980 – Marlon King, English footballer
- 1980 – Anna Mucha, Polish actress and journalist
- 1980 – Channing Tatum, American actor and producer
- 1981 – Caro Emerald, Dutch pop and jazz singer
- 1981 – Ms. Dynamite, English rapper and producer
- 1981 – Sandra Schmitt, German skier (died 2000)
- 1982 – Novlene Williams-Mills, Jamaican sprinter
- 1983 – José María López, Argentinian racing driver
- 1983 – Jessica Lynch, American soldier
- 1985 – John Isner, American tennis player
- 1986 – Lior Refaelov, Israeli footballer
- 1986 – Yuliya Zaripova, Russian runner
- 1987 – Jorge Andújar Moreno, Spanish footballer
- 1989 – Melvin Ingram, American football player
- 1989 – Kang Daesung, South Korean singer
- 1990 – Jonathan dos Santos, Mexican footballer
- 1990 – Mitch Rein, Australian rugby league player
- 1990 – Nevin Spence, Northern Irish rugby player (died 2012)
- 1990 – Joey Wendle, American baseball player
- 1991 – Peter Handscomb, Australian cricketer
- 1991 – Isaac Liu, New Zealand rugby league player
- 1992 – Aaron Judge, American baseball player
- 1992 – Delon Wright, American basketball player
- 1994 – Daniil Kvyat, Russian racing driver
- 1994 – Odysseas Vlachodimos, Greek international footballer
- 1996 – Jordan Pefok, American footballer
- 1997 – Kirill Kaprizov, Russian ice hockey player
- 1997 – Amber Midthunder, American actress
- 1997 – Calvin Verdonk, Indonesian footballer
- 2001 – Thiago Almada, Argentine footballer
- 2005 – Alex Sarr, French basketball player

== Deaths ==
=== Pre-1600 ===
- 499 – Emperor Xiaowen of Northern Wei (born 467)
- 645 – Richarius, Frankish monk and saint (born 560)
- 680 – Mu'awiya I, Umayyad caliph (born 602)
- 757 – Pope Stephen II (born 715)
- 893 – Chen Jingxuan, general of the Tang Dynasty
- 962 – Adalbero I, bishop of Metz
- 1192 – Emperor Go-Shirakawa of Japan (born 1127)
- 1366 – Simon Islip, Archbishop of Canterbury
- 1392 – Chŏng Mong-ju, Korean civil minister, diplomat and scholar (born 1338)
- 1444 – Robert Campin, Flemish painter (born 1378)
- 1478 – Giuliano de' Medici, Italian ruler (born 1453)
- 1489 – Ashikaga Yoshihisa, Japanese shōgun (born 1465)
- 1558 – Jean Fernel, French physician (born 1497)

=== 1601–1900 ===
- 1686 – Magnus Gabriel De la Gardie, Swedish statesman and military man (born 1622)
- 1716 – John Somers, 1st Baron Somers, English jurist and politician, Lord High Chancellor of Great Britain (born 1651)
- 1784 – Nano Nagle, Irish nun and educator, founded the Presentation Sisters (born 1718)
- 1789 – Petr Ivanovich Panin, Russian general (born 1721)
- 1809 – Bernhard Schott, German music publisher (born 1748)
- 1865 – John Wilkes Booth, American actor, assassin of Abraham Lincoln (born 1838)
- 1881 – Ludwig Freiherr von und zu der Tann-Rathsamhausen, German general (born 1815)
- 1895 – Eric Stenbock, Estonian-English author and poet (born 1860)

=== 1901–present ===
- 1910 – Bjørnstjerne Bjørnson, Norwegian-French author, poet, and playwright, Nobel Prize laureate (born 1832)
- 1915 – John Bunny, American actor (born 1863)
- 1915 – Ida Hunt Udall, American diarist (born 1858)
- 1916 – Mário de Sá-Carneiro, Portuguese poet and writer (born 1890)
- 1920 – Srinivasa Ramanujan, Indian mathematician and theorist (born 1887)
- 1932 – William Lockwood, English cricketer (born 1868)
- 1934 – Arturs Alberings, Latvian politician, former Prime Minister of Latvia (born 1876)
- 1934 – Konstantin Vaginov, Russian poet and novelist (born 1899)
- 1940 – Carl Bosch, German chemist and engineer, Nobel Prize laureate (born 1874)
- 1944 – Violette Morris, French footballer, shot putter, and discus thrower (born 1893)
- 1945 – Sigmund Rascher, German physician and SS member, conductor of human experiments in the concentration camps (born 1909)
- 1945 – Pavlo Skoropadskyi, German-Ukrainian general and politician, Hetman of Ukraine (born 1871)
- 1946 – James Larkin White, American miner, explorer, and park ranger (born 1882)
- 1950 – George Murray Hulbert, American lawyer, judge, and politician (born 1881)
- 1951 – Arnold Sommerfeld, German physicist and academic (born 1868)
- 1956 – Edward Arnold, American actor (born 1890)
- 1957 – Gichin Funakoshi, Japanese martial artist, founded Shotokan (born 1868)
- 1964 – E. J. Pratt, Canadian poet and author (born 1882)
- 1968 – John Heartfield, German illustrator and photographer (born 1891)
- 1969 – Morihei Ueshiba, Japanese martial artist, founded aikido (born 1883)
- 1970 – Erik Bergman, Swedish minister and author (born 1886)
- 1970 – Gypsy Rose Lee, American actress, striptease dancer, and writer (born 1911)
- 1973 – Irene Ryan, American actress and philanthropist (born 1902)
- 1976 – Sidney Franklin, American bullfighter (born 1903)
- 1976 – Sid James, South African-English actor (born 1913)
- 1976 – Armstrong Sperry, American author and illustrator (born 1897)
- 1980 – Cicely Courtneidge, Australian-born British actress, comedian and singer (born 1893)
- 1981 – Jim Davis, American actor (born 1909)
- 1984 – Count Basie, American pianist, composer, and bandleader (born 1904)
- 1986 – Broderick Crawford, American actor (born 1911)
- 1986 – Bessie Love, American actress (born 1898)
- 1986 – Dechko Uzunov, Bulgarian painter (born 1899)
- 1987 – Shankar, Indian composer and conductor (born 1922)
- 1987 – John Silkin, English lawyer and politician, Shadow Leader of the House of Commons (born 1923)
- 1989 – Lucille Ball, American model, actress, comedian, and producer (born 1911)
- 1991 – Leo Arnaud, French-American composer and conductor (born 1904)
- 1991 – Carmine Coppola, American composer and conductor (born 1910)
- 1991 – A. B. Guthrie, Jr., American novelist and historian, (born 1901)
- 1991 – Richard Hatfield, Canadian lawyer and politician, 26th Premier of New Brunswick (born 1931)
- 1994 – Masutatsu Ōyama, Japanese martial artist, founded Kyokushin kaikan (born 1923)
- 1996 – Stirling Silliphant, American screenwriter and producer (born 1918)
- 1999 – Adrian Borland, English singer-songwriter, guitarist, and producer (born 1957)
- 1999 – Jill Dando, English journalist and television personality (born 1961)
- 2003 – Rosemary Brown, Jamaican-Canadian academic and politician (born 1930)
- 2003 – Yun Hyon-seok, South Korean poet and author (born 1984)
- 2003 – Edward Max Nicholson, Irish environmentalist, co-founded the World Wide Fund for Nature (born 1904)
- 2004 – Hubert Selby, Jr., American author, poet, and screenwriter (born 1928)
- 2005 – Mason Adams, American actor (born 1919)
- 2005 – Elisabeth Domitien, Prime Minister of the Central African Republic (born 1925)
- 2005 – Maria Schell, Austrian-Swiss actress (born 1926)
- 2005 – Augusto Roa Bastos, Paraguayan journalist, author, and academic (born 1917)
- 2007 – Jack Valenti, American businessman, created the MPAA film rating system (born 1921)
- 2008 – Árpád Orbán, Hungarian footballer (born 1938)
- 2009 – Hans Holzer, Austrian-American paranormal investigator and author (born 1920)
- 2010 – Mariam A. Aleem, Egyptian graphic designer and academic (born 1930)
- 2010 – Urs Felber, Swiss engineer and businessman (born 1942)
- 2011 – Phoebe Snow, American singer-songwriter and guitarist (born 1950)
- 2012 – Terence Spinks, English boxer and trainer (born 1938)
- 2013 – Jacqueline Brookes, American actress and educator (born 1930)
- 2013 – George Jones, American singer-songwriter and guitarist (born 1931)
- 2013 – Earl Silverman, Canadian men's rights advocate (born 1948)
- 2014 – Gerald Guralnik, American physicist and academic (born 1936)
- 2014 – Paul Robeson, Jr., American historian and author (born 1927)
- 2014 – DJ Rashad, American electronic musician, producer and DJ (born 1979)
- 2015 – Jayne Meadows, American actress (born 1919)
- 2015 – Marcel Pronovost, Canadian ice hockey player and coach (born 1930)
- 2016 – Harry Wu, Chinese human rights activist (born 1937)
- 2017 – Jonathan Demme, American filmmaker, producer and screenwriter (born 1944)
- 2022 – Klaus Schulze, German composer and musician (born 1947)
- 2023 – Jerry Apodaca, American politician, 24th Governor of New Mexico (born 1934)

== Holidays and observances ==
- Chernobyl disaster related observances:
  - Day of Remembrance of the Chernobyl tragedy (Belarus)
  - Memorial Day of Radiation Accidents and Catastrophes (Russia)
- Christian feast day:
  - Aldobrandesca (or Alda)
  - Lucidius of Verona
  - Our Lady of Good Counsel
  - Pope Anacletus and Marcellinus
  - Rafael Arnáiz Barón
  - Riquier
  - Paschasius Radbertus
  - Robert Hunt (Episcopal Church (USA))
  - Blessed Stanisław Kubista
  - Stephen of Perm, see also Old Permic Alphabet Day
  - Trudpert
  - April 26 (Eastern Orthodox liturgics)
- Confederate Memorial Day (Florida, United States)
- Union Day (Tanzania)
- World Intellectual Property Day
