= 1st Tactical Airlift Group (JASDF) =

Unit of the Japan Air Self-Defense Force

- 第1輸送航空隊
- Active: March 31, 1978
- Country: Japan
- Branch: Japan Air Self-Defense Force
- Garrison/HQ: Komaki Air Base

Aircraft flown
- Transport: Lockheed C-130H Hercules, Boeing KC-767J

1st Tactical Airlift Group (第1輸送航空隊, dai-ichi-kusoukoukuutai) is a group of the Japan Air Self-Defense Force based at Komaki Air Base in Aichi Prefecture. It is sometimes referred to as the 1st Tactical Airlift Wing.

It consists of two squadrons:

- 401st Tactical Airlift Squadron (Lockheed C-130H Hercules)
- 404th Tactical Airlift Tanker Squadron (Boeing KC-767J)
