= Felber =

Felber (German and Swiss German: topographic name for someone who lived by a conspicuous willow tree) may refer to:

- Adam Felber, American author and actor
- Barbara K. Felber, American biologist
- Dean Felber, American musician
- Fred Felber, American football player
- Hans Felber, German general
- Laura Felber (born 2001), Swiss footballer
- René Felber, Swiss politician
- Urs Felber, Swiss industrialist and philanthropist.

== See also ==
- Felber Autoroller, Austrian car
