= Nagoya Airport =

Nagoya Airport may refer to one of two airports serving in Nagoya, Japan:

- Chūbu Centrair International Airport, also known as Chūbu Airport
- Nagoya Airfield, formerly known as Nagoya Airport, also known as Komaki Airport
