= Antonio Guzmán Capel =

Spanish painter (born 1960)

Capel
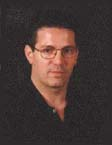
- Born: Antonio Carlos Guzmán Capel; 19 January 1960 (age 66); Tétouan
- Known for: Painting

Antonio Guzmán Capel (born 19 January 1960) is a Spanish painter who painted the poster for Palencia's Holy Week in 2024. Since 1961 he has resided in the city of Palencia, Spain.

== Exhibitions ==
- 1971 His first exhibition in the Palencia's Tourism Office, Palencia
- 1974 Moves Gallery, Fribourg, Switzerland
- 1979 Tingad Gallery, Salamanca
- 1980 Ajuria Gallery, Palencia
- 1982 Rua 2 Gallery, Burgos ----- Doctor's Association Gallery, Cáceres
- 1984 Fine Arts Gallery, Gijón ----- Guest in “Salon de les Nations”, Paris
- 1985 Duran Gallery, Madrid ----- Toscana Gallery, Valencia.
- 1986 Caja Postal, Cuenca, Toledo, San Lorenzo Del Escorial
- 1988 Group Exhibition in Towers Gallery, Bilbao
- 1989 Group Exhibition in Renoir Room, Zaragoza ----- Centro-Arte Gallery, León
- 1990 Art International Gallery, Bilbao
- 1992 Caja España, Palencia
- 1995 Group Exhibition in Towers Gallery, Bilbao
- 1996 Arte Sur, International Fair of the Contemporary Art, Granada ----- Martín Brezmes Gallery, Zamora ----- Juan Larrea Gallery, Bilbao
- 1997 First International Fair of the Contemporary Art of C. y L., Salamanca ----- Mar Gallery, Barcelona ----- C. J. Art Gallery, Valladolid ----- Ercilla Gallery, Bilbao
- 1999 Caja Cantabria, Santander ----- Caja España, Palencia
- 2000 Arte Sevilla 2000, Seville ----- Arte Santander, Santander ----- artexpo, Las Vegas (Nevada) USA ----- Group Exhibition in San Diego, US ----- 25 years of Contemporary Art, Diaz Caneja Foundation, Palencia
- 2003 Tribute to Claudio Prieto, Diaz Caneja Foundation, Palencia ----- Restauro Van Dick Gallery, Madrid
- 2004 Caja España, Palencia ----- BBVA Gallery, Valladolidd
- 2006 Sharon Art Gallery, León
- 2008 Sharon Art Gallery, León
- 2009 Global Art Gallery, Barcelona ----- Caja España, Palencia
- 2010 Exposición colectiva en la Sala Mauro Muriedas de Torrelavega, verano 2010 ----- Ayuda a "Hombres Nuevos", Obispo Nicolás Castellanos, Caja Duero, PALENCIA ----- Colección del Ayuntamiento de Palencia Fundación Díaz Caneja
- 2011 Fundación Isabel Frontela, PALENCIA
- 2012 Feria de Arte de Bolzano, del 16 al 18 marzo, ITALIA ----- Galería Javier Román, MÁLAGA
- 2013 Factory-Art Gallery, Berlín, ALEMANIA. Cibeles Place, Mail Room, MADRID 2013

== Awards and honors ==
- 1974 1st National Prize "City of Ceuta" ----- Honourable mention in the Prize of Painting "Ejército", Madrid
- 1975 1st Prize “Pintura Jóven” Guardo, Palencia
- 1976 Honourable mention in the II National Biennial of Huesca ----- Finalist in Art Sport 76, Bilbao
- 1977 2nd Prize in Medina del Campo, Valladolid ----- 2nd Prize in the Caja de Ahorros Provincial of Valladolid
- 1978 Special Honourable mention in Pego, Alicante
- 1979 Accesit Painting Competition "Rafael Zabaleta", JAÉN -----1st Prize in XXX Puertollano's Gallery, Ciudad Real -----Honourable mention in the II Competition "Rioja", Logroño -----1st Prize "Ciudad de Benicarló", Castellón
- 1980 2nd Prize in the I National Young Competition "Amadis Gallery", Madrid -----1st Prize in Barbastro, Huesca -----1st Prize in Aranda de Duero Burgos -----1st Prize "García Gongora", Ateneo de Almeria -----Finalist in the V Biennial "Provincia de Leon"
- 1981 1st Prize in Mora. Toledo ----- 2nd Prize in Rota, Cadiz
- 1982 1st Prize in Martos, Jaen ----- Silver award in Córdoba
- 1983 Special Mention of Painting in the “Salon d´hiver” Avignon, France ----- Painting grant given by the Provincial Delegation of Palencia ----- 2nd Prize National Painting Competition in Campo de Criptana, Ciudad Real ----- 1st Prize in Yecla, Murcia
- 1985 1st Prize in the IV Painting Competition in Melilla ----- 3rd Prize in IV Jaén Painting Competition (Club "63"), JAÉN ----- 1st Prize "Ciudad de Murcia" in Cartagena.
- 1987 Honorary accésit IV Painting Competition "Ciudad de Miranda de Ebro", Burgos
- 1988 1st Accésit in the XV National Painting Competition of Teruel
- 1989 Popular Prize in the 1st fast Painting Competition in "El Retiro", Madrid
- 1996 LVII National Exhibition of Plastic Arts in Valdepeñas, Ciudad Real
- 1997 1st Prize in Ciudad Rodrigo, Salamanca
- 1998 Silver medal Townhall of San Juan, Alicante
- 2001 Finalist "Señorío de Berrtiz", Pamplona
- 2002 Finalist Toresma 2, Madrid ----- 1st Mention of Honor “Premio Ejército del Aire”, Madrid
- 2003 1st Prize of Painting Toresma, Madrid ----- Mention of Honor “Premio Ejército del Aire”, Madrid
- 2004 1st Prize “Cartel taurino de San Antolín”, Palencia
- 2005 1st Prize “Cartel taurino feria de León” ----- 2nd Prize “Premio Ejército del Aire”, Madrid
- 2006 Mention of Honor “Premio Ejército del Aire”, Madrid ----- Work entitled "Gitanillos" for the movie Guillermo Fesser, "Candida".
- 2009 Portrait of Brother Rafael (Rafael Arnáiz Barón), for his canonization in Vatican City on 11/10/09 ----- Poster announcing Davis Cup, Murcia
- 2010 Cry bullfighting posters for parties of Ciudad Real 2010
- 2011 Portrait of Catherine Lacoste and Angel Piñero
- 2012 Portrait of Cayetana Fitz-James Stuart, Duchess of Alba ----- Course and Conference on Psychology University Model of Mérida, Yucatán, Mexico

== Bibliography ==
- Spanish art, 1979–93
- Diart 1981
- Peliart 1977, 1981
- Provincial savings bank of Valladolid Memory 1978
- Batik 1981
- National aids of Painting and Sculpture. Mª Teresa Cocaine Valladolid 1981
- Arteder 82 It shows the Graphical Work International Bilbao 1982
- Arteguuia Special monographic dedicated to Palencia 1989
- CAPEL, by Jose Maria Esparta 1990
- Arteguia 1992-93
- Anuari D'Art Grup Escolà 1996-97
- I Fair the International of Contemporary Art of Castile and León Arcale 1997
- Tribute 16 artists surroundings to Santiago Amon. Prov Delegation Palencia
- Tourist Palencia 1997
- Art 21 Fertile valleys 2000
- 25 Years of Contemporary Art Palencia, 1975–2000
- Toresma-2 April 2002
- 4th History of the THAT (Publishing ECIR)
- Cossio 2006
