= 401st Tactical Airlift Squadron (JASDF) =

- 第401飛行隊
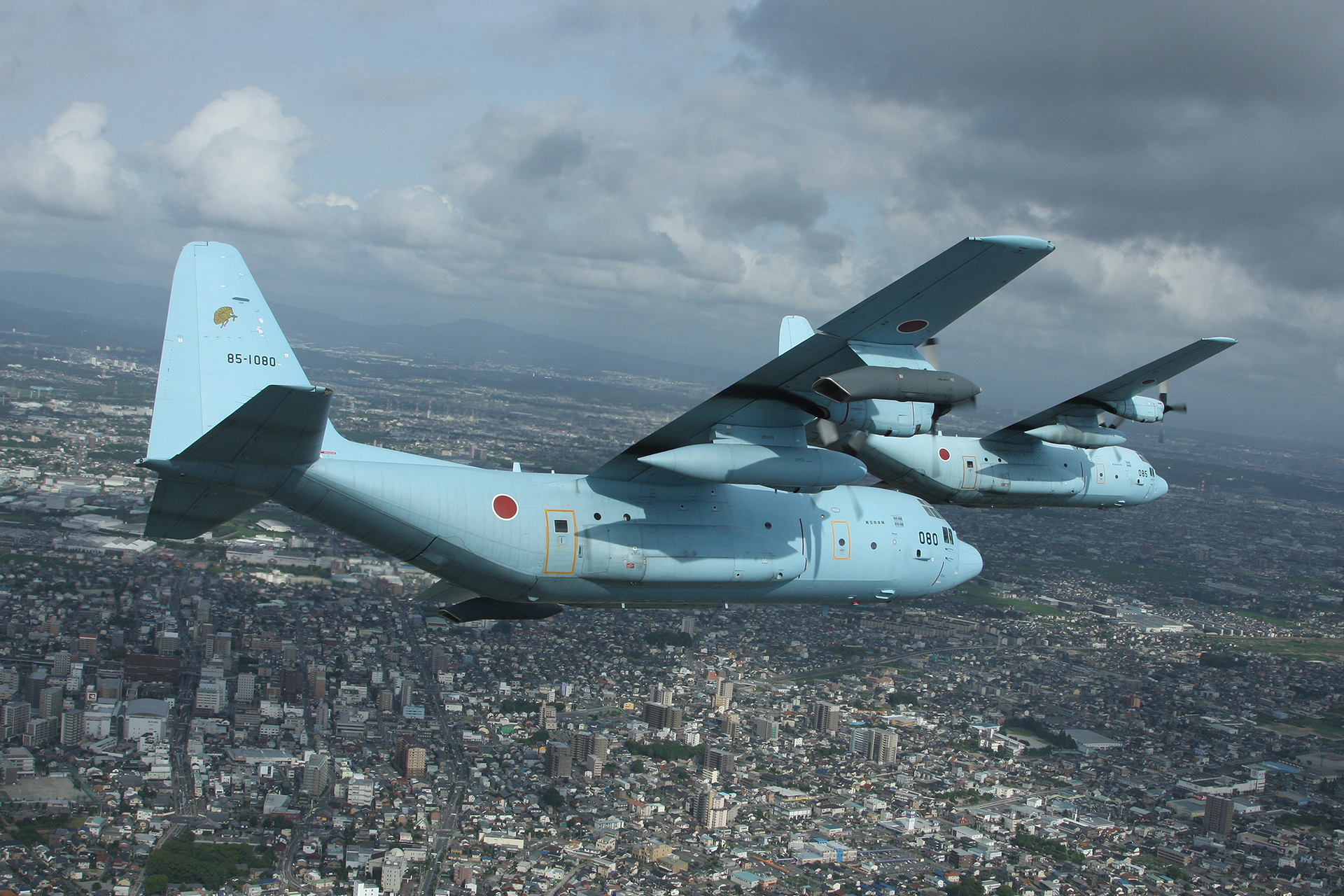
- C-130Hs of 401st Squadron
- Active: October 1, 1968
- Country: Japan
- Allegiance: 1st Tactical Airlift Group
- Branch: Japan Air Self-Defense Force
- Garrison/HQ: Komaki Air Base

Aircraft flown
- Transport: Lockheed C-130H, Lockheed KC-130H

The 401st Tactical Airlift Squadron (第401飛行隊, dai-yon-zero-ichi-hikoutai) is a squadron of the 1st Tactical Airlift Group of the Japan Air Self-Defense Force (JASDF) based at Komaki Air Base in Aichi Prefecture, Japan. It is equipped with Lockheed C-130H Hercules and Lockheed KC-130H Hercules aircraft.

The C-130H has a greater range than its predecessor the Kawasaki C-1, and since the 1980s Japan's posture has gradually become more outward-looking and the Self-Defense Forces have become more involved in activities beyond Japan's shores. These have included humanitarian relief and evacuation missions, supporting US and Japanese military activities, and participation in multi-national military exercises.

== History ==
The squadron was formed on October 1, 1968, operating the Curtiss C-46D Commando. For ten years previously, between 1958 and 1968, a predecessor squadron had operated. The squadron went on to operate the YS-11 and Kawasaki C-1 before re-equipping with the longer-ranged Lockheed C-130H Hercules in the 1980s. Since that time aircraft of the squadron have deployed overseas on many occasions.

=== Humanitarian missions ===
On several occasions in the 1990s Japan dispatched squadron C-130s to prepare for possible evacuations of Japanese nationals. In July 1997 one was sent to Thailand amid upheavals in Cambodia, and in 1998 six were sent to Singapore in case Japanese needed to be evacuated from Indonesia. As it happened neither evacuation was required.

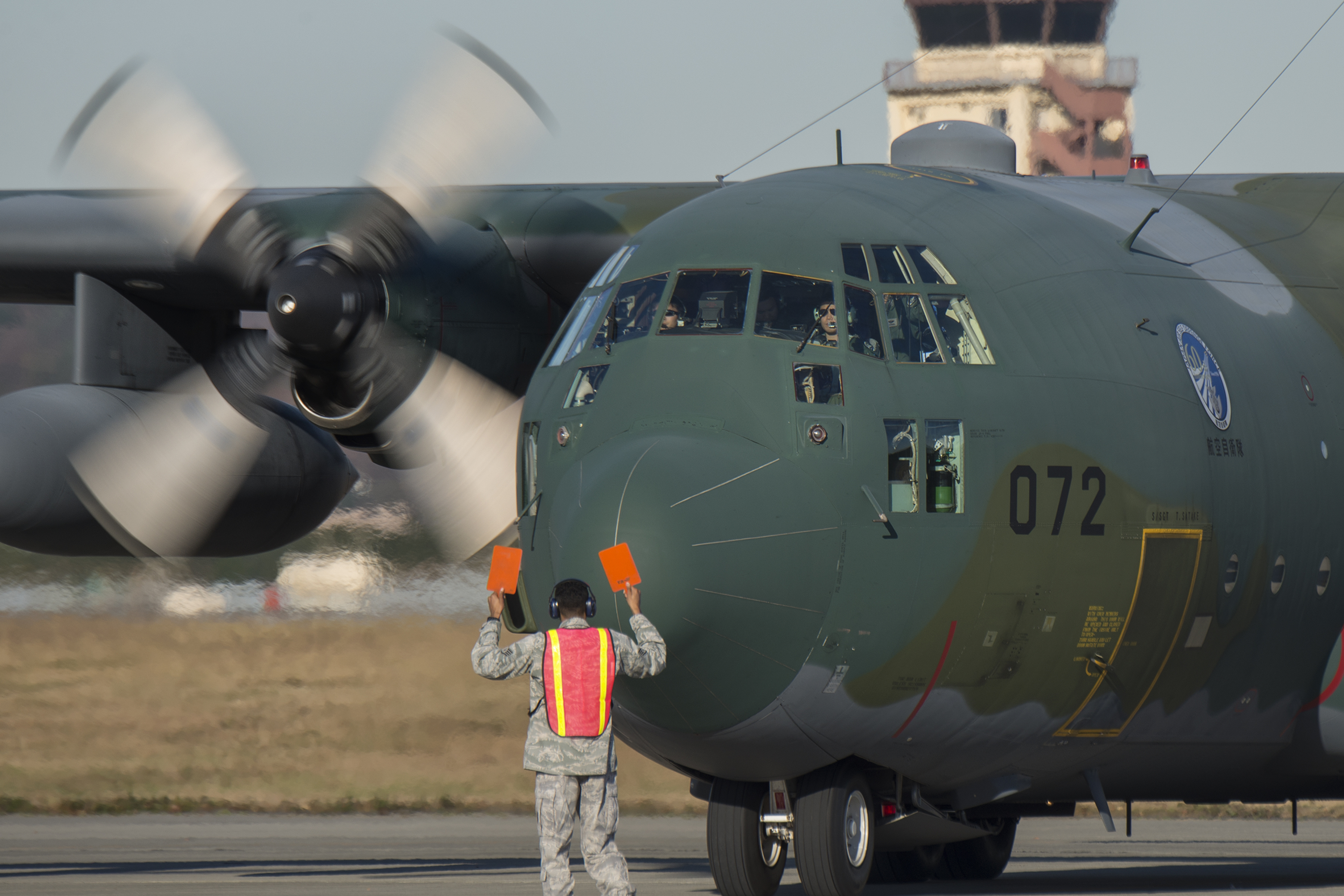
C-130H participating in Operation Christmas Drop 2016

Japan did not participate in the Australian-led multinational intervention in East Timor, but in 1999 a C-130 was sent to West Timor in case Japanese citizens needed to be evacuated. From November 26, 1999, to February 1, 2000, three C-130s from the squadron including one backup flew a humanitarian airlift. In 47 rotations the aircraft transported 402 tons of supplies in Kupang, West Timor.

In October 2001 six squadron C-130s transported humanitarian aid (tents, blankets and relief supplies) for Afghan refugees in Pakistan.

In a mission lasting from July 11 to July 26, 2016, three of the squadron's C-130s were sent to Japan Self-Defense Force Base Djibouti to evacuate Japanese citizens from Juba in South Sudan after fighting broke out there. They were expected to pick up around 70 Japanese citizens. It was also announced that some of the people to be evacuated were non-Japanese working with the Japan International Cooperation Agency (JICA). By July 14 the aircraft had evacuated 47 Japanese nationals to Nairobi in Kenya, and took four Japanese embassy employees to Japan Self-Defense Force Base Djibouti. Around 20–30 Japanese remained in Juba.

One aircraft participated in December 2015 edition of the US Air Force's Operation Christmas Drop in the Pacific, along with one RAAF C-130J and three US C-130s. The JASDF and RAAF also participated in the 2016, 2017, 2018 and 2019 operations.

In January 2020 two squadron C-130s and around 80 SDF personnel flew to Australia during the unprecedented 2019–20 Australian bushfire season. They flew to RAAF Base Richmond and were expected to be deployed across New South Wales, Victoria and South Australia as necessary.

=== Afghanistan and Iraq ===
Almost half of Japan's C-130s were used in support of Operation Enduring Freedom, the US-led campaign against Afghanistan. While not participating in Afghanistan directly they provided support by flying US equipment and personnel to Singapore, Guam and other places. This freed up US resources to focus on the war in Afghanistan.

Squadron C-130s were active in Iraq from 2004 to 2008. The provided support to the Japan Ground Self-Defense Force contingent deployed there after the invasion.

=== Military exercises ===
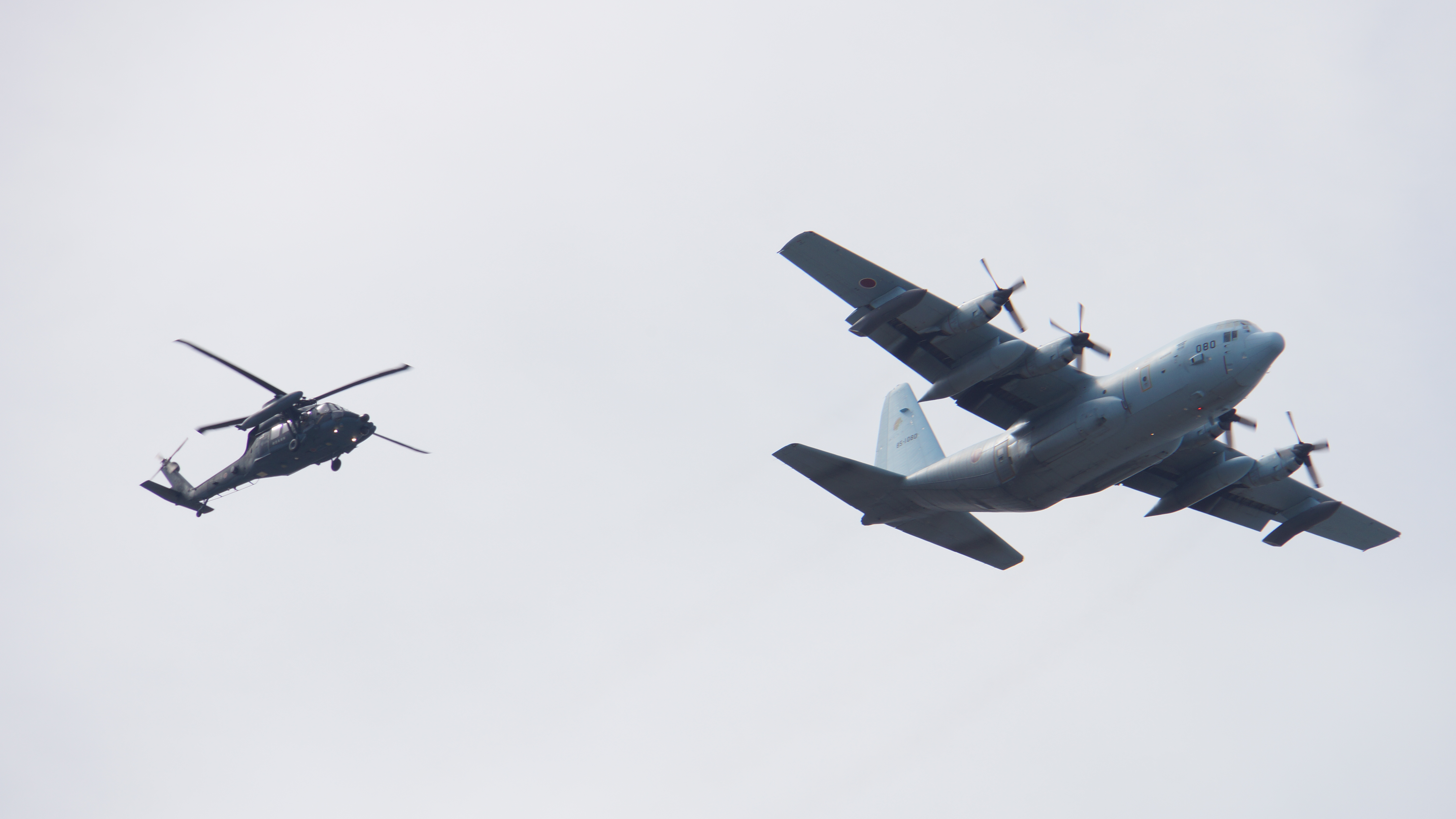
KC-130H Aerial refueling Demonstration (2016)

Japan has taken place in the Cobra Gold military exercise in Thailand since 2005. In February 2017 a squadron C-130 was used in a drill for evacuating Japanese and US citizens ending with a short flight.

In March 2012, a year after the Royal Australian Air Force (RAAF) had assisted Japan following the 2011 Tōhoku earthquake and tsunami, one of the squadron's aircraft visited RAAF Base Richmond in Australia.

The squadron has participated in the Cope North military exercise on a number of occasions, including in 2009, 2013, 2016 and 2017.

=== In-flight refuelling ===
From 2010 two of the squadron's C-130Hs (95-1080 and 95-1083) have been equipped with aerial fuel-receiving and refueling functions, making them of KC-130H standard. This provides the JASDF with the ability to refuel the UH-60J search and rescue helicopters of its Air Rescue Wing.

=== Other missions ===
Typhoon Haiyan relief operations (2013)

In response to Typhoon Haiyan hitting the Philippines in November 2013 squadron C-130s were deployed, along with other SDF aircraft.

After the disappearance of Malaysia Airlines Flight 370 in March 2014 two of the squadron's aircraft were sent to Subang Airport in Malaysia to assist in the search.

In January 2016 after North Korea claimed to have exploded a hydrogen bomb, a squadron C-130, along with three Kawasaki T-4 aircraft, were used to test for radioactive particles. The flights were done for around 14 days. The flights did not detect any radioactive particles.

== Tail marking ==
The tail-marking of the 401st Squadron was a red "Shachihoko", or killer whale, with Nagoya Castle on a blue background and a figure "1", which represented the "1"st Tactical Airlift Group commanding the 401st Squadron. This tail-marking is no longer used on their C/KC-130H aircraft.

== Aircraft operated ==
- Curtiss C-46 (1968–1978)
- NAMC YS-11P (1969–1989）
- Kawasaki C-1 (1973–1989）
- Lockheed C-130H Hercules (1984–present）
- Lockheed KC-130H Hercules (2010–present）
