= 404th Tactical Airlift Tanker Squadron (JASDF) =

404th Tactical Airlift Squadron
- 第404飛行隊
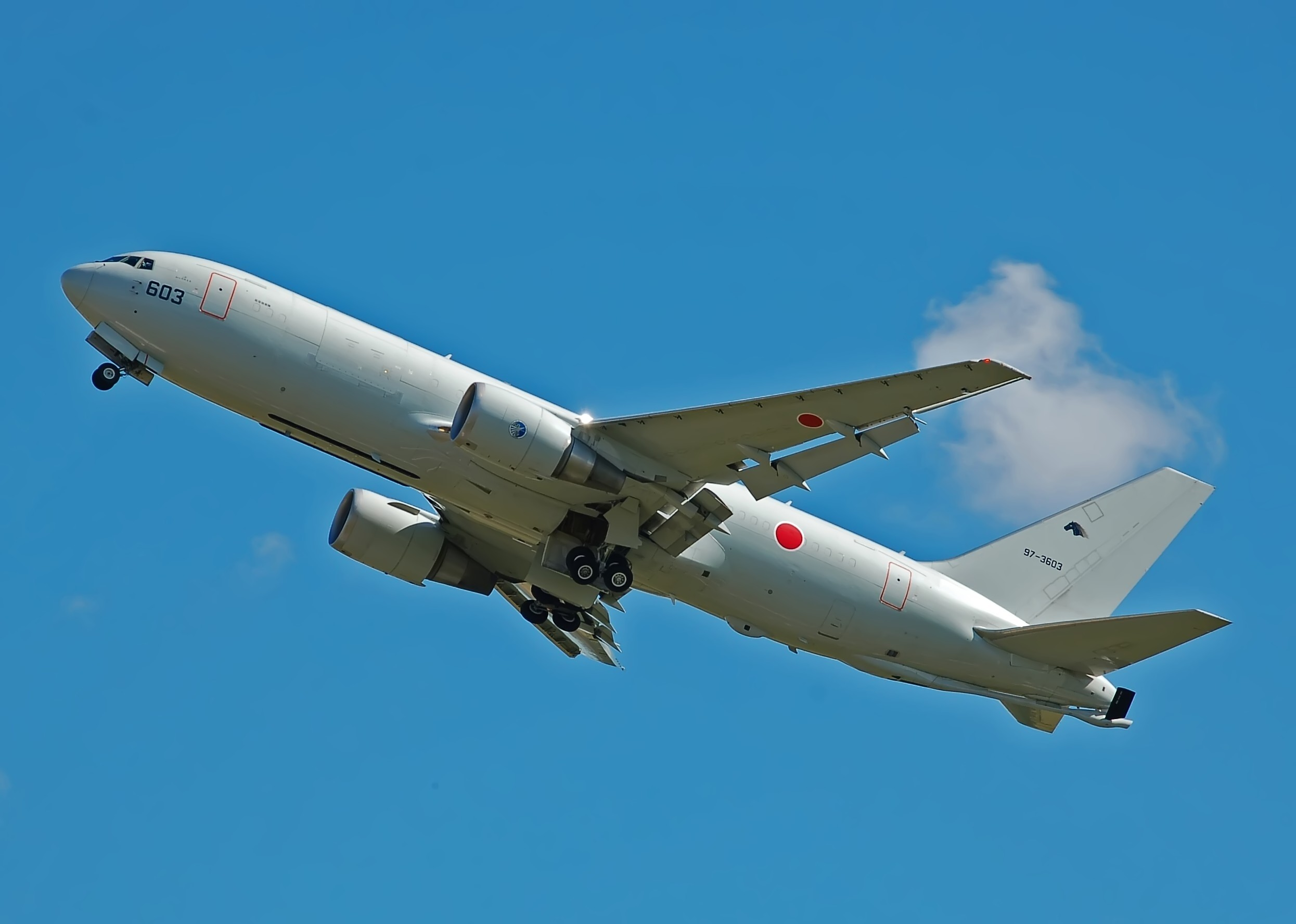
- 404 Squadron KC-767 (2014)
- Active: March 26, 2009
- Country: Japan
- Allegiance: 1st Tactical Airlift Group
- Branch: Japan Air Self-Defense Force
- Garrison/HQ: Komaki Air Base

Aircraft flown
- Tanker: Boeing KC-767J

The 第404飛行隊 (404th Tactical Airlift Tanker Squadron, dai-yon-zero-yon-hikoutai) is a tanker squadron of the 1st Tactical Airlift Group of the Japan Air Self-Defense Force based at Komaki Air Base in Aichi Prefecture, Japan. It is equipped with four Boeing KC-767J aircraft.

== History ==
While most JASDF units rarely travel outside Japan, since the squadron's establishment in 2009 its aircraft have travelled outside Japan on exercises, transport missions and displays at airshows on a number of occasions.

=== Exercises ===
Aircraft from the squadron have participated in Red Flag – Alaska including in the 2014-2 and 2015-3 editions. They have also participated in the Cope North exercise held in Guam, beginning in 2013 and including the 2015 and 2017 exercises. In July 2017 it performed training flights with the Eurofighter Typhoons of the Royal Air Force in the United Kingdom.

=== Operational deployments ===
In November 2013 the squadron dispatched an aircraft to the Philippines in the wake of Typhoon Haiyan. The aircraft transported medical equipment and relief supplies from Manila to Cebu.

In December 2014 an aircraft of the squadron carried 20,000 protective suits to Accra in Ghana during the Ebola epidemic. Another 680,000 suits were to be delivered by commercial aircraft.

=== Airshows ===
While it has not been common for Japan Self-Defense Force aircraft to appear at airshows outside Japan, The KC-767Js of the squadron have appeared at international air shows on many occasions, usually as a static display.

Japanese KC-767Js have appeared at the 2012, 2014, 2016 and 2017 editions of the Royal International Air Tattoo in the UK.

The squadron's aircraft have appeared at the Australian International Airshow, marking the JASDF's debut at that show in 2013, and also appeared in 2015 and 2017.

== Tail markings ==
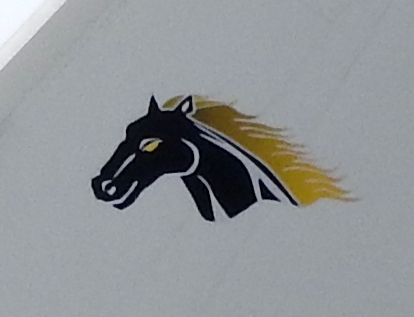
Tail marking (2016)

Aircraft of the squadron bear tail markings of a black horse's head with a flowing yellow mane.

== Aircraft operated ==
- Boeing KC-767J (2009–present）
