= Aichi Museum of Flight =

Coordinates: 35.2477951°N 136.9227184°E

- あいち航空ミュージアム
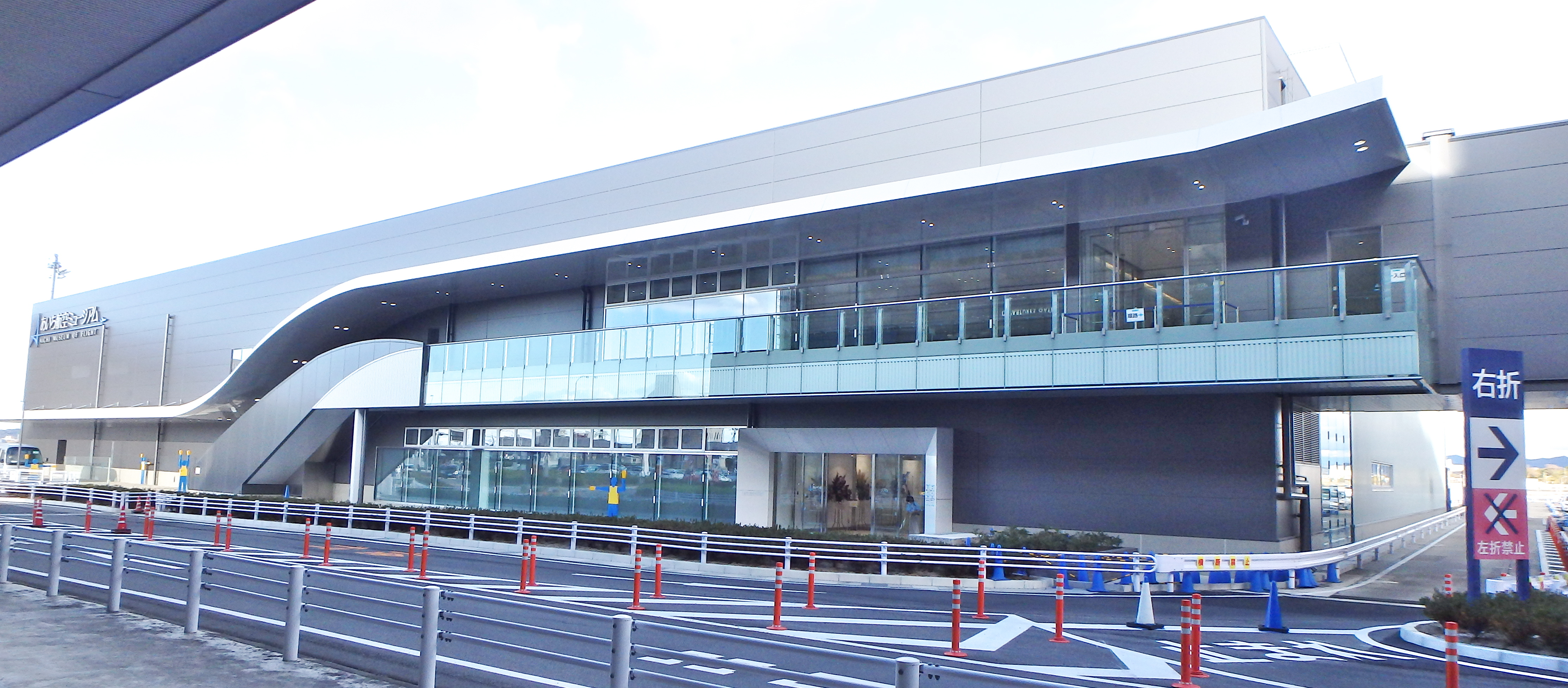
- Established: November 30, 2017
- Location: Toyoyama, Nishikasugai, Aichi Prefecture, Japan 480-0202
- Type: Aviation museum
- Website: aichi-mof.com

Aichi Museum of Flight (あいち航空ミュージアム, aichi-koukuu-myūjiamu) is an aviation museum located in Toyoyama, Aichi Prefecture. It was set up next to the Airport Walk Nagoya which was renovated from the former international terminal in the southwestern part of Nagoya Airfield.

== Overview ==
At the Nagoya airfield, "Nagoya Airport Aviation Space Center" was established as an exhibition facility, but closed at the prefecture airport due to the opening of Chubu International Airport on October 31, 2004, some of the exhibits will be in the Shinmei Park. It was relocated to a well-maintained aircraft boon.

Aichi Prefecture is undertaking to nurture and promote the aerospace industry in response to the designation of "Asia No. 1 Aerospace Industry Cluster Formation Special Zone" in the International Special Strategy Comprehensive Special Zone, and around the Nagoya Aerodrome have long since been Mitsubishi Heavy Industries Nagoya Aerospace Systems In addition to the location of the manufacturing factory (Nagoya), Mitsubishi Aircraft is constructing a new MRJ final assembly plant, which is the aircraft development and production base. From being expected as a place for human resource development and industrial tourism in the future, the prefecture will hold "Air Museum Field" as a "prefectural Nagoya Airport visitor base visiting facility maintenance project" at a press conference on May 15, 2015 we announced to construct.

In the concept, in order to make the area around the airport a base for industrial sightseeing in the aeronautical field, based on Seattle, home of Boeing and Toulouseas the headquarters of Airbus, exhibits aimed at aircraft as a facility for visitors maintain the facility "Aichi Aviation Museum" which is scattered in the periphery and accumulated aircraft industry/tourism resources and core facilities cooperate, "MRJ mass production factory tour", "airport facility background tour", "MHI historical room exploration tour", "JAXA Visit Tour", "Self Defense Force Base Tour", "Shooting Spot · Tour" etc., and plan to utilize the whole area as a field museum for school education, human resource development and industrial tourism.

Designated managers selected Nagoya Airport Building, which operates as the airport terminal buildings. It opened on November 30, 2017, and entered into a cooperative alliance with the Seattle Aviation Museum in the USA. The number of visitors is about 650,000 a year at the beginning of the opening, and thereafter aims at about 350,000 people per year. You can get discounts on the products and services of Nagoya Airport Walk by boarding pass (entrance ticket) of the Aichi Aviation Museum.

== Aircraft on display ==
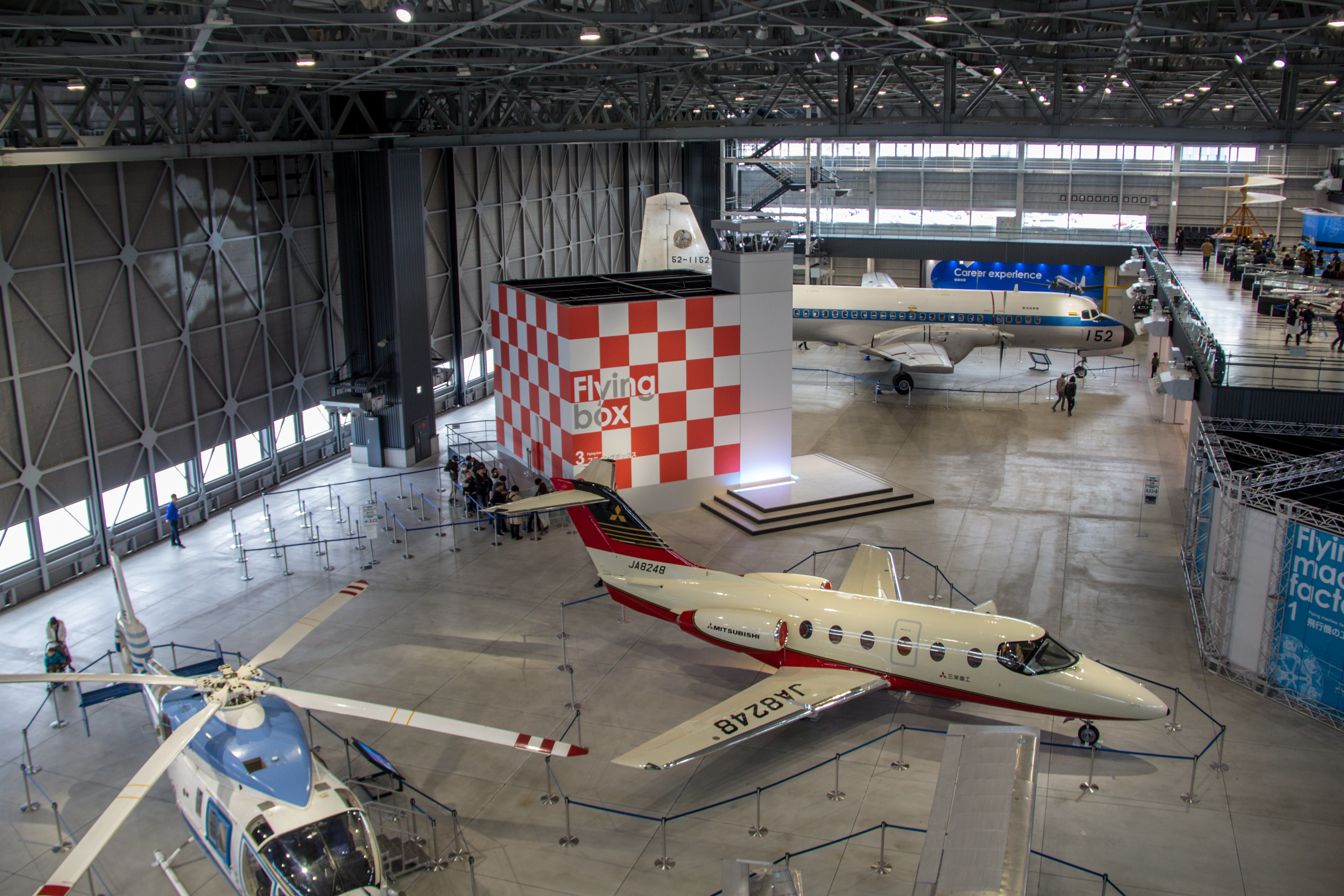
Exhibition planes

- European Helicopter EH-101
- Mitsubishi A6M5a Zero – Replica
- Mitsubishi MU-2
- Mitsubishi MH2000
- Mitsubishi MU-300
- NAMC YS-11P 52-1152

== See also ==
- List of aviation museums
