= Lucidius of Verona =

Italian Catholic bishop and Christian saint

Saint Lucidius was a 4th century bishop of Verona, Italy and is a Roman Catholic saint.

He is revered for his holiness and learning, devoting himself in a very special manner to study and prayer, in order to be the better fitted to instruct his flock. His relics are enshrined in the Basilica of Saint Stephen. His feast day is April 26.
