= Boeing KC-767 =

2000s American military tanker/transport aircraft

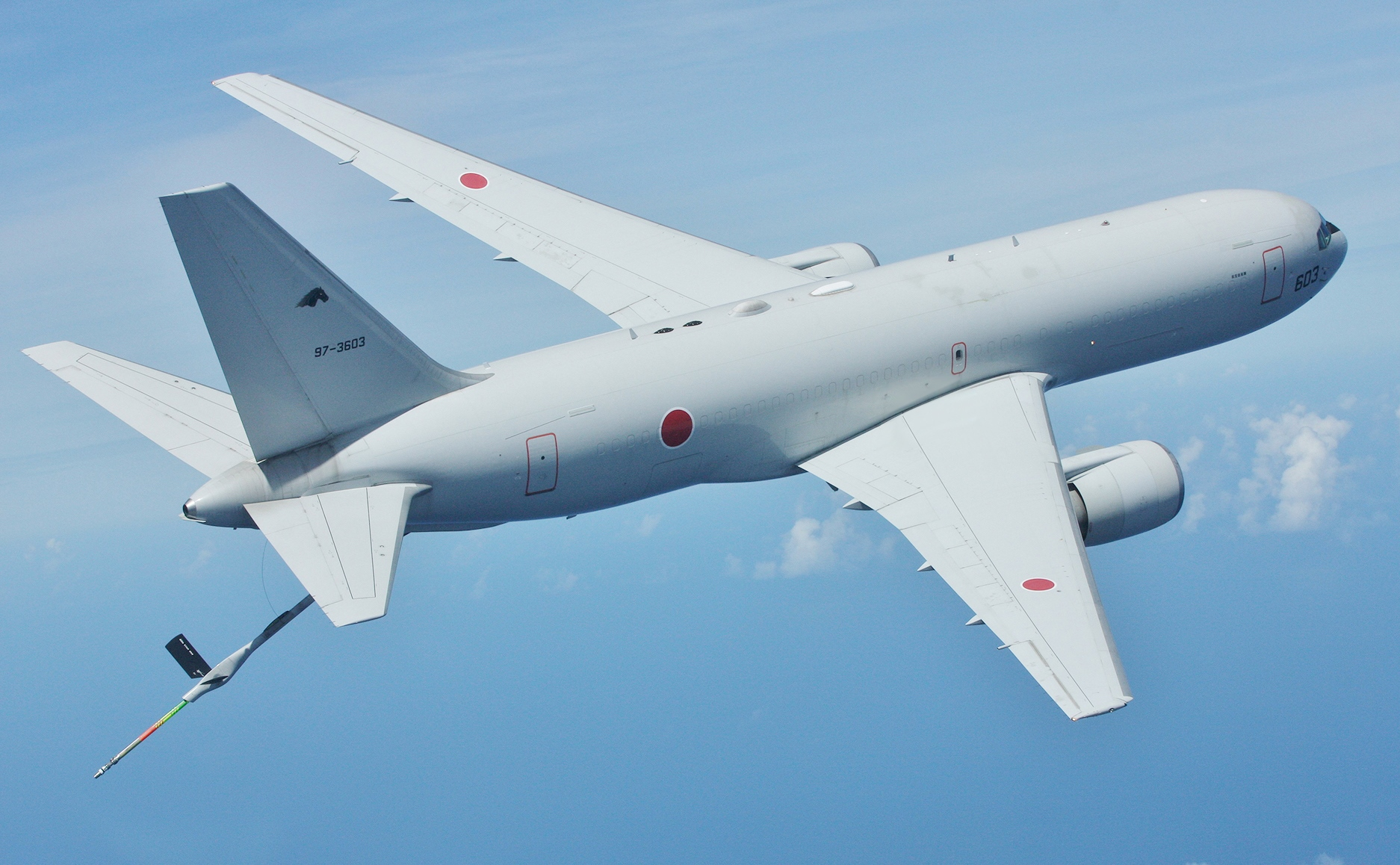
- A Japan Air Self-Defense Force KC-767J

General information
- Type: Tanker/transport
- National origin: United States
- Manufacturer: Boeing Integrated Defense Systems
- Status: In service
- Primary users: Italian Air Force; Japan Air Self-Defense Force Colombian Aerospace Force
- Number built: 9 (8 originally built, 1 converted)

History
- Manufactured: 2003–present
- First flight: 21 May 2005
- Developed from: Boeing 767
- Developed into: Boeing KC-46 Pegasus

The Boeing KC-767 is a military aerial refueling tanker and transport aircraft developed from the Boeing 767-200ER. The tanker received the designation KC-767A, after being selected by the U.S. Air Force (USAF) initially to replace older KC-135Es. In December 2003, the contract was frozen and later canceled due to corruption allegations.

The tanker was developed for the Italian and Japanese air forces, who ordered four tankers each. Financing of the development of the aircraft has largely been borne by Boeing, in the hope of receiving major orders from the USAF. Boeing's revised KC-767 proposal to the USAF was selected in February 2011 for the KC-X program under the designation KC-46.

== Development ==
=== Commercial Derivative Air Refueling Aircraft ===
At the start of the 2000s a considerable and sudden increase in their maintenance costs was leading the U.S. Air Force to run a procurement program for the replacement of around 100 of its oldest KC-135E Stratotankers. Most USAF KC-135s are of the updated KC-135R variant.

In early 2002 the USAF began negotiations with Boeing on the lease of tankers based on the Boeing 767 after it considered the Airbus A330-based tanker, the KC-330, to be more costly and a higher technical risk. The USAF said that an assessment of the two types "shows that the EADS offering presents a higher-risk technical approach and less preferred financial arrangement". It also said that the larger KC-330 "does not bring with it a commensurate increase in available air-refuelling offload".

In addition, the KC-767 has manual flight controls with an unrestricted flight envelope. The Boeing tanker officially received the KC-767A designation from the U.S. DoD in 2002 and that appeared in the 2004 edition of the DoD Model Designation report.

==== USAF lease, cancellation and re-award ====
For its Commercial Derivative Air Refueling Aircraft program, the USAF decided to lease around 100 KC-767 tankers from Boeing after it was selected. Despite other nations engaging in leasing of military aircraft, there was some criticism. U.S. Senator John McCain questioned whether it is really cost-effective for the USAF to lease aircraft at all, particularly as the aircraft would probably not have many, if any, buyers when their U.S. military service ended. The Congressional Budget Office has also criticized the draft leasing agreement as fiscally irresponsible. In November 2003, a compromise was struck whereby the Air Force would purchase 80 KC-767 aircraft and lease 20 more.

In December 2003, the Pentagon announced the project was to be frozen while an investigation of allegations of corruption by one of its former procurement staffers, Darleen Druyun (who had moved to Boeing in January) was undertaken. Reporter Joseph L. Galloway wrote that some documents found in congressional investigation indicated the A330-based tanker met more of the USAF specifications than the Boeing tanker and had a lower proposed cost. Druyun pleaded guilty and was sentenced to nine months in jail for "negotiating a job with Boeing at the same time she was involved in contracts with the company". Additional fallout included the termination of Boeing CFO Michael M. Sears, who was sentenced to four months in prison in 2005, and the resignation of Boeing CEO Philip M. Condit. The Air Force's KC-767A contract was officially canceled by the DoD in January 2006.

=== International acquisitions ===
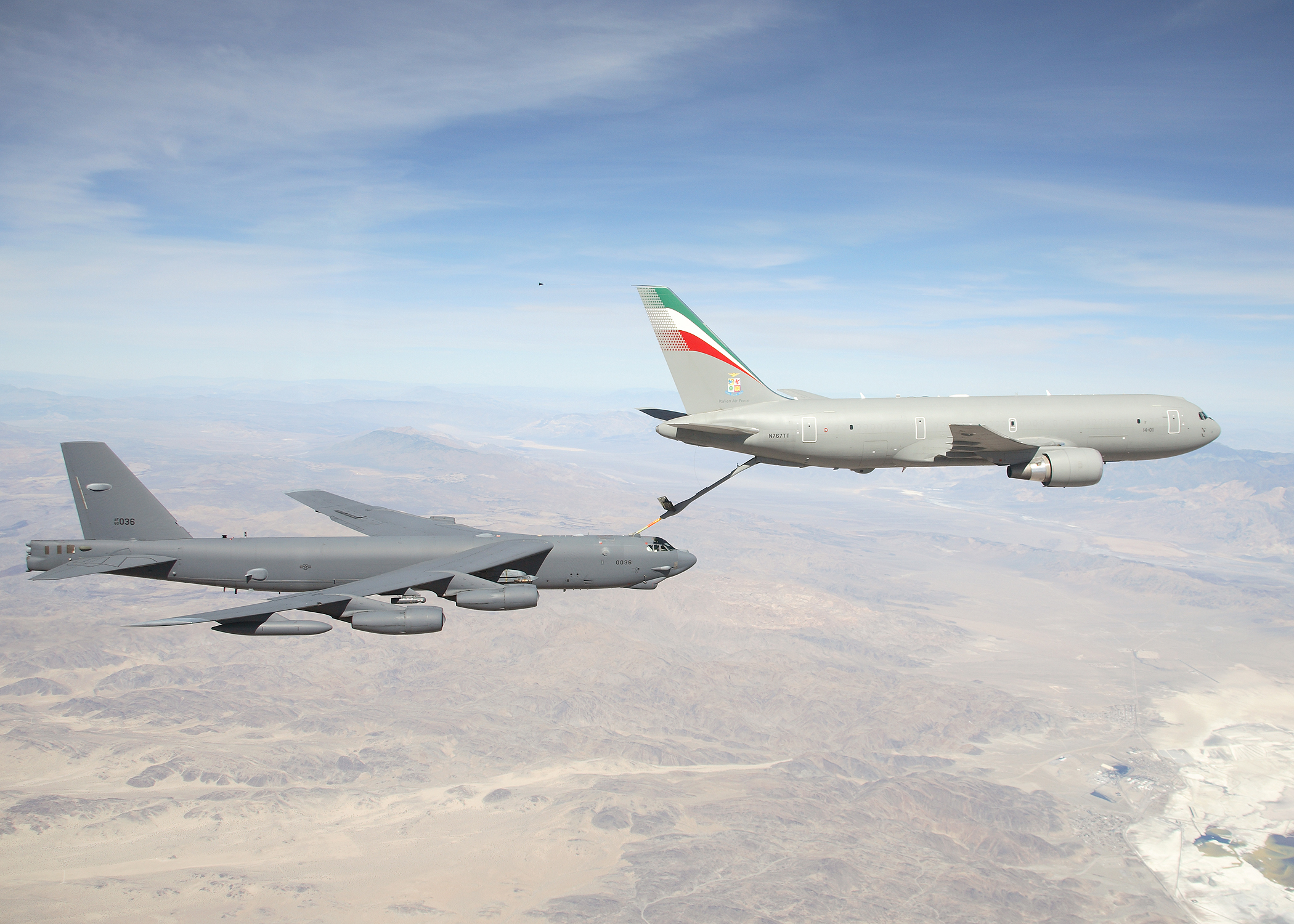
A KC-767A of the Aeronautica Militare refueling a USAF B-52H, 2007.

==== Italy ====
Boeing continued development of the aircraft. Italy selected the KC-767A and signed a contract in 2002 becoming the launch customer, with delivery set for 2005. The Italian Air Force (Aeronautica Militare) ordered four aircraft. This version is based on the 767-200ER and is named the KC-767 Tanker Transport, and is fitted with boom and hose-drogue refueling systems on the centerline with hose-drogue wingpod systems.

Italy's aircraft became the first KC-767 to be assembled. The aircraft were initially built as 767-200ER commercial airplanes, then flown to a separate facility for conversion into tankers. Italy's first aircraft made its maiden flight on 21 May 2005. Italy's second aircraft arrived for modification at the facility of Boeing's partner, Aeronavali, in Naples, Italy, on 6 May 2005.

Delivery of the tankers to the Italian Air Force was delayed due to an issue with flutter of the wing pods and other technical issues. Boeing provided a 767 for training during this time. After resolving the issues, Boeing delivered the first KC-767 in January, and the second in March 2011. These aircraft officially entered service on 17 May 2011 with the 14º Stormo. After entering service, the two KC-767s have supported NATO operations in Afghanistan and Libya. The final two tankers were delivered in late 2011.

==== Japan ====
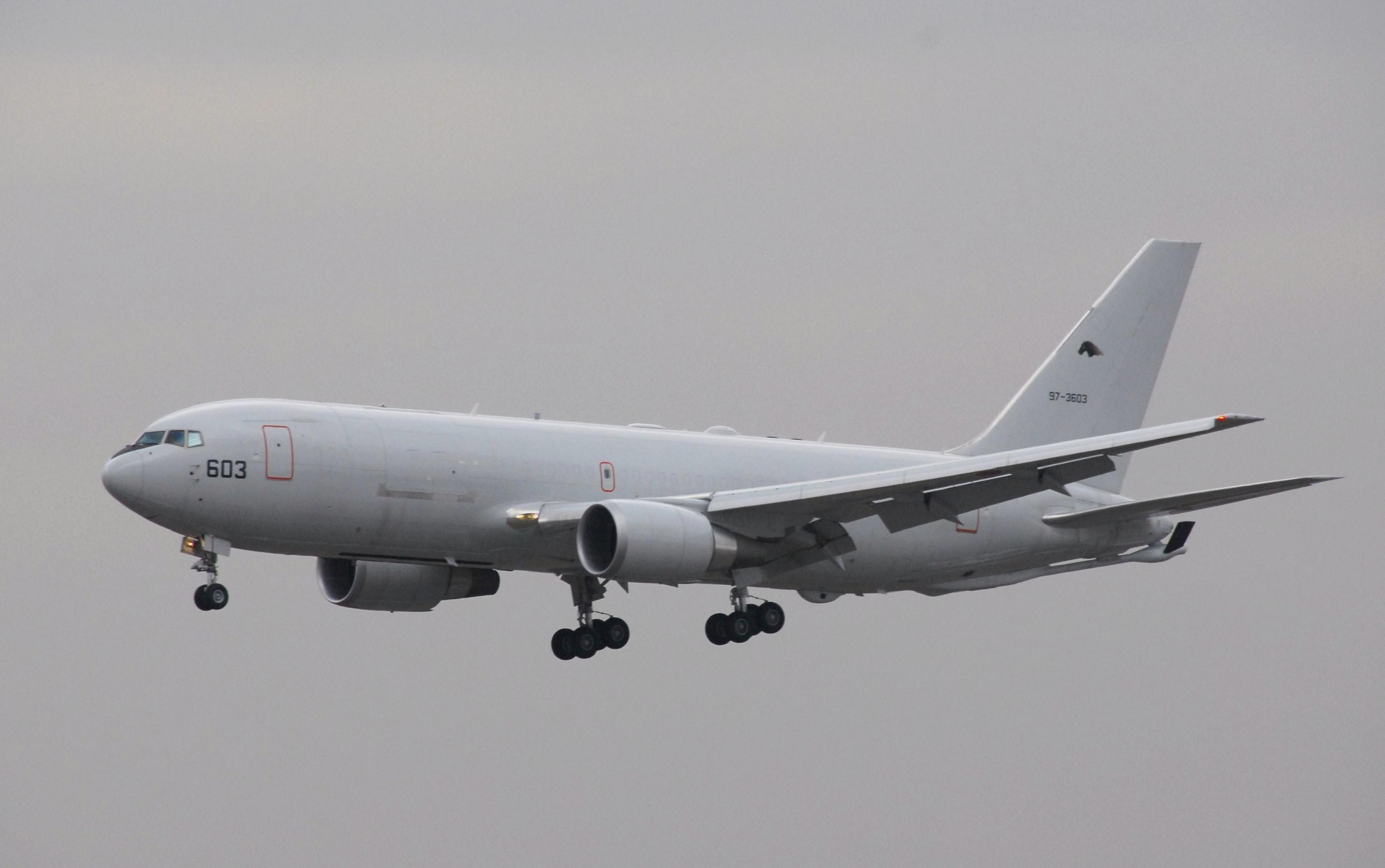
A KC-767J of the Japan Air Self-Defense Force, 2010

In 2001, Japan selected the KC-767 over the Airbus A310 MRTT and signed a contract in 2003. The Japan Air Self-Defense Force (JASDF) ordered four aircraft and has designated the tanker KC-767J. In June 2005, Japan's first aircraft arrived at Boeing's Wichita, Kansas modification center to be fitted out with the tanker equipment.

Delivery of the first KC-767J for the JASDF was delayed approximately two years due to development issues and the addition of the aircraft receiving FAA certification. The Japanese version of the tanker is equipped only with the boom refueling system. Boeing and its Japanese representative Itochu agreed with Japan Ministry of Defense (MoD) to pay a penalty fee for the delivery delay, according to the MoD Statement. The first operational KC-767J was delivered to the JASDF on 19 February 2008, with the second KC-767J following on 5 March. The third KC-767 was delivered to the JASDF in March 2009. The three KC-767J aircraft reached initial operational capability (IOC) status with the JASDF in May 2009. The fourth tanker was delivered in January 2010. The aircraft are operated out of Komaki Air Base by 404th Tactical Airlift Tanker Squadron.

=== Civilian 767 conversions ===
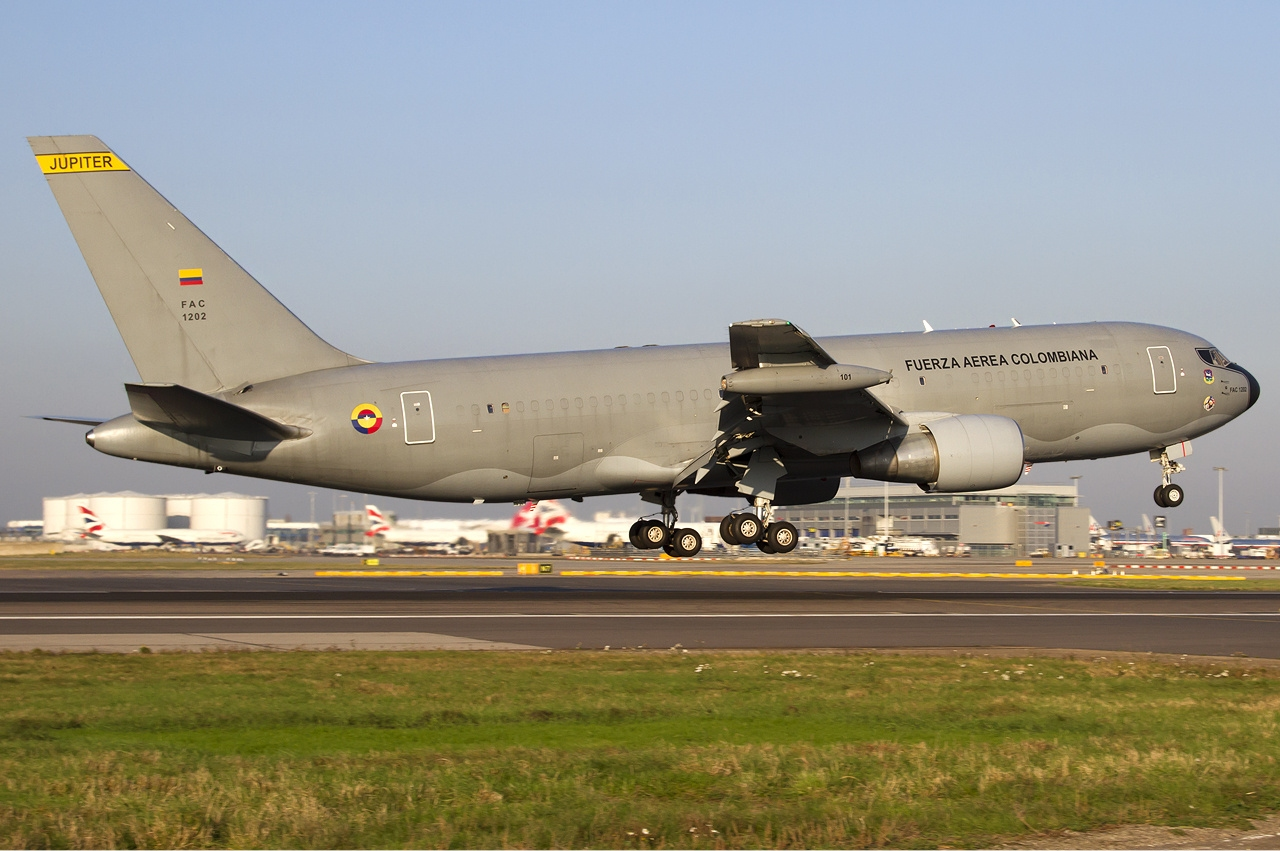
An IAI-converted KC-767 MMTT, operated by the Colombian Aerospace Force.

As a low-cost alternative for nations unable to purchase new-build AAR tankers, Israel Aerospace Industries (IAI) developed a variant of the KC-767, designated as the KC-767 Multi Mission Tanker Transport (MMTT). Designed as a cost-effective option against the KC-46 and the A330 MRTT, the KC-767 MMTT involves the conversion of pre-owned Boeing 767s into aerial tankers by the Bedek Aviation Group, a subsidiary of IAI. It is configured to suit the necessities of the customer, with multiple capabilities - including cargo transport, VIP transport, aerial refueling and ISR.

As part of its capabilities, the KC-767 MMTT incorporates a special cargo door, built-in cargo pallet capabilities, interchangeable passenger seats and operator consoles, ARP3 wing refueling pods and a fly-by-wire boom refueling system. As part of the conversion process, a significant proportion of the structure, wiring and systems of the aircraft are replaced, upgraded or refurbished, tailored to the customer's specific requirements.

According to Bedek, the KC-767 MMTT has a maximum takeoff weight of 400,000 lb (180,000 kg) and a maximum fuel load of 159,800–200,000 lb (72,500–90,700 kg), with the capacity to support 13 Lockheed Martin F-16 fighters on missions with a range of 1,000 nmi (1,900 km; 1,200 mi).

The first KC-767 MMTT, converted from a Boeing 767-200ER platform formerly operated by Air China, was tested in 2010; the converted tanker successfully demonstrated the aerial refueling of an IAI Kfir C10 fighter during a 3.5 hour test flight.

==== Colombia ====
In 2008, IAI was contracted to convert a secondhand Boeing 767-200ER, into an AAR tanker which would also serve as VIP transport, for the Colombian Air Force. The converted aircraft, nicknamed "Jupiter" (FAC-1202), was successfully tested in September 2010, and was delivered in November 2010. Colombia's KC-767 MMTT supported US Navy EA-18G Growlers during Exercise Red Flag 19-2 in March 2019.

==== India ====
On 6 April 2022, Hindustan Aeronautics Limited (HAL) signed an agreement with Israel Aerospace Industries (IAI) to convert six Boeing 767 commercial airliners into Multi Mission Tanker Transport (MMTT) in India. However, Boeing has to grant permission for such a conversion.

It was confirmed on 27 October 2025 that the Israel Aerospace Industries (IAI), in partnership with Hindustan Aeronautics Limited (HAL), is the frontrunner and only contender for the ₹8,000 crore (equivalent to ₹83 billion or US$860 million in 2026) project as others did not meet the requirements to be shortlisted. The firm has offered to modify pre-owned Boeing 767 into refuellers and supply them to the IAF. They have agreed to meet the 30% indigenous content clause, part of the offset agreement. The aircraft, with cargo and transport capabilities, will be converted in HAL facilities. The deal was cleared by the Defence Acquisition Council (DAC) at a cost of ₹9,000 crore (equivalent to ₹93 billion or US$970 million in 2026) on 29 December. As of 1 January 2026, a Cost Negotiation Committee (CNC) is being constituted to negotiate the price of the contract. The negotiation is to be followed by the proposal being moved to the Cabinet Committee on Security (CCS) for final approval for contract signing.

Reports in Israeli media from 1 November 2026 indicated that a contract worth US$905.7 million will be signed with IAI for converting six commercial Boeing 767 airliners into refuelling aircraft configuration for IAF. The deliveries are expected between 2028 and 2030.

=== Former interests ===
==== Australia ====
Australia selected the Airbus A330 MRTT in April 2004 after competition with the KC-767 due to the A330's larger fuel and cargo capability.

==== United Kingdom ====
Boeing, teamed with BAE Systems and British Airways, offered the KC-767 to the UK's RAF for its Future Strategic Tanker Aircraft. The companies formed the Tanker Transport Services Consortium (TTSC). British Airways would provide the 767 aircraft, Boeing would provide the conversion technology based on its KC-767 tanker design and BAE Systems would perform the majority of aircraft modifications. Marshall Aerospace, Serco, Spectrum, and Capital were also part of TTSC. The Ministry of Defence announced in January 2004 that it had selected the Airbus A330 MRTT to fulfill this requirement.

==== Republic of Korea ====
The KC-767 was to compete with the A330 MRTT for the Republic of Korea Air Force's procurement of four tanker aircraft. In June 2015, South Korea selected the A330 MRTT over the KC-46 for the procurement.

==== Brazil ====
In 2013, the Brazilian Air Force Command (FAB) selected IAI to provide two KC-767-300ER MMTT tankers, under its KC-X2 procurement initiative. However, a contract for the supply of the two aircraft was never finalised, and the project was ultimately abandoned.

=== USAF KC-X program ===
On 24 February 2011, Boeing's KC-767 proposal was selected by the USAF as the winning offer to replace part of the KC-135 fleet. The aircraft received the designation KC-46A. Boeing was awarded an initial development contract to build and deliver 18 operational tankers by 2017.

== Operational history ==
=== Flight testing ===
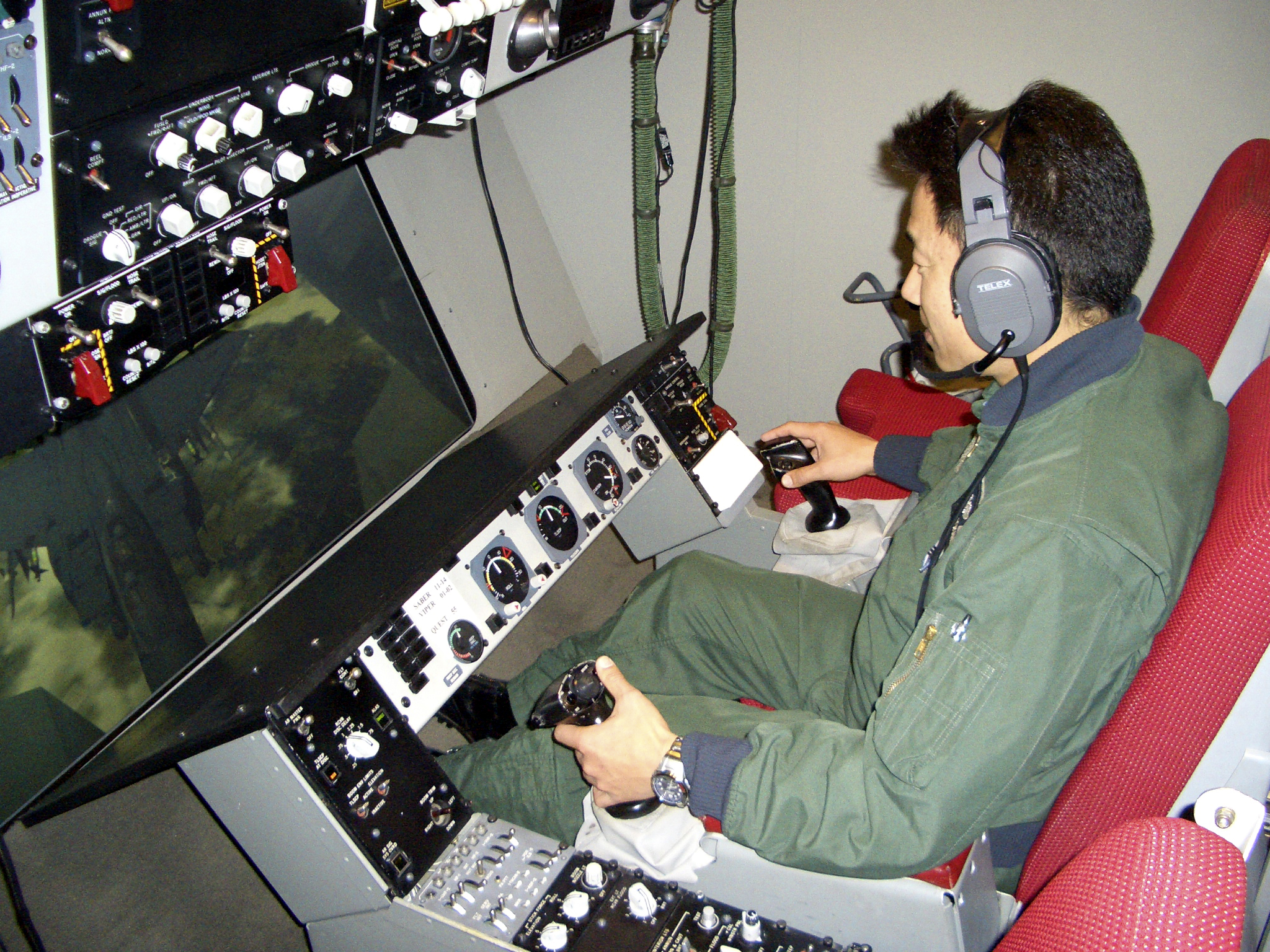
A JASDF boom operator simulates refueling an F-15 in a KC-10A simulator at Travis AFB, 2006.

On 23 January 2007, the KC-767 flight test aircraft set a program milestone by making its first hookup with a receiver aircraft, a Boeing B-52 Stratofortress. The "dry contact" transferred no fuel, but was intended to test the tanker's fifth-generation fly-by-wire telescoping boom. Unlike the KC-135 boom operator, who is prone, the KC-767 operator uses a remote station with a video display. The testing was being done at Edwards Air Force Base, and the test aircraft was destined for Italy once testing was complete.

The KC-767 extended its air refueling boom and transferred fuel to another aircraft for the first time on 5 March 2007. The tanker completed another test milestone on 12 April 2007 when its aircrew successfully extended and retracted both wing refueling hoses. In November 2007, Boeing decided to shift modification work on the KC-767A tankers for Italy and Japan from subcontractor Aeronavali's facility in Italy to Boeing's Wichita facility in an effort to meet delivery schedules.

== Variants ==
=== Boeing KC-767 variants ===
KC-767A
Tanker variant of the 767-200 originally for the United States Air Force; order cancelled. Four similar aircraft built for the Italian Air Force.
KC-767J
Designation for the KC-767A built for the Japan Air Self Defence Force, four built.
KC-46A
Tanker variant of the 767-2C for the U.S. Air Force.

=== Converted Boeing 767 variants ===
KC-767 MMTT
Multi-purpose tanker/cargo transport variant derived from the conversion of pre-owned Boeing 767s, developed by Israel Aerospace Industries (IAI).
KC-X2
Designation for IAI-converted Boeing 767-300ER, intended for the Brazilian Air Force; now abandoned.

== Operators ==
Italy

- Italian Air Force
  - 14º Stormo - 4 KC-767A aircraft, in service.

Japan

- Japan Air Self-Defense Force
  - 404th Tactical Airlift Tanker Squadron - 4 KC-767J aircraft, in service.

Colombia

- Colombian Aerospace Force - 1 KC-767 MMTT, in service.

== Specifications (KC-767) ==
Data from KC-767A, and Boeing 767-200ER specifications

General characteristics

- Crew: 3: 2 pilots, 1 boom operator
- Capacity: up to 200 passengers or 19 463L pallets
- Length: 159 ft 2 in (48.5 m)
- Wingspan: 156 ft 1 in (47.6 m)
- Height: 52 ft 0 in (15.8 m)
- Empty weight: 181,610 lb (82,377 kg)
- Max takeoff weight: 395,000 lb (186,880 kg)
- Maximum Fuel Load: 160,660 lb (72,877 kg)
- Powerplant: 2 × GE CF6-80C2 turbofan, 60,200 lbf (268 kN) thrust each

Performance

- Maximum speed: 570 mph (915 km/h, 500 kn) Mach 0.86
- Cruise speed: 530 mph (851 km/h, 460 kn) Mach 0.80
- Range: 7,600 mi (12,200 km, 6,385 nmi) ; global with in flight refueling
- Service ceiling: 40,100 ft (12,200 m)

== See also ==
Related development

- Boeing 767
- Boeing E-767
- Boeing KC-46 Pegasus
- Northrop Grumman E-10 MC2A

Aircraft of comparable role, configuration, and era

- Airbus A310 MRTT
- Airbus A330 MRTT
- EADS/Northrop Grumman KC-45

Related lists

- List of tanker aircraft
