= Barbara K. Felber =

American biologist

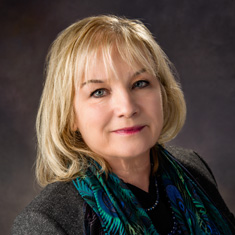
- Education: University of Bern
- Scientific career
- Fields: Retrovirus, gene regulation
- Workplaces: National Cancer Institute

Barbara K. Felber is an American biologist specialized in human retrovirus pathogenesis and gene regulation. She is a senior investigator in the vaccine branch at the National Cancer Institute.

== Education ==
Felber completed a Ph.D. in molecular biology from the University of Bern. She was a postdoctoral researcher in the laboratory of biochemistry at the National Cancer Institute.

== Career and research ==
In 1985, Felber joined the Molecular Mechanisms of Carcinogenesis Laboratory of the National Cancer Institute contract Basic Research Program. In 1990, she established the Human Retrovirus Pathogenesis Group. In 1998, Felber received her tenure appointment and, in 1999, she joined the Center for Cancer Research at the National Cancer Institute. Her work focuses on the posttranscriptional mechanisms of gene regulation, use of cytokines in cancer and AIDS, and the development of DNA-based HIV vaccines. Felber is a senior investigator in the National Cancer Institute vaccine branch.
