= Urs Felber =

- Born: 10 July 1942; Egerkingen, Switzerland
- Died: 26 April 2010 (aged 67)
- Occupations: Businessman and design pioneer

Urs Felber (born 10 July 1942), a pioneer of furniture design, was the CEO of Vitra USA. Felber was also the board director for several companies including Swissflex and was chairman and principal shareholder for the furniture company Dietiker AG.

Felber was born Egerkingen, Switzerland. He studied engineering at the Swiss Federal Institute of Technology (ETH) before going on to get design management degrees at Stanford University and the University of Fribourg. He then went on to become the president of Vitra USA and board director for several companies.

Felber died on 26 April 2010 at the age of 67. His daughter, Nathalie Felber, then became the CEO of the Swiss company Dietiker AG.

== Life and career ==
Felber was born on 10 July 1942 in Egerkingen, Switzerland, a small town in the canton of Solothurn. His family ran a local carpentry workshop.

From 1962 to 1965, he studied mechanical engineering at the Swiss Federal Institute of Technology (ETH) in Zurich. In 1964, he replaced a fellow student in his field study at a small furniture manufacturer company, De Sede. In 1966, he became a system engineer at De Sede. He took a 50 percent stake in the company. By 1978, De Sede was exporting to over 70 countries.

In 1979, he obtained a PhD in Design Management at Stanford University, California and the University of Fribourg, Switzerland, achieving magna cum laude. He authored Systematic Design Management in the Enterprise: Fundamentals and Concepts which heralded the birth of design management, design science and methodology.

In the 1980s, he became a business partner and CEO of Vitra USA, the world's leading contract furniture manufacturing firm. Parallel to his US activities, he became a board director in several companies, including Wilkhahn International, Wilkhahn Switzerland, Swissflex and Team by Wellis.

In 2001, Urs Felber bought the Swiss furniture company Dietiker AG from the supermarket chain Migros and transformed it into a recognized brand by incorporating contemporary designs, with products winning the Red Dot Design Award and Neocon Innovation Award. Dietiker became a leader in Switzerland and Europe in the contract furniture market.

== Awards and honors ==
In 1999, Urs Felber was made an Honorary Fellow of the Tel Aviv Museum of Art. In 2002, he received Doctor Honoris Causa from the University of Tel Aviv On 20 May 2003, the Aviva and Urs Felber Jubilee Plaza was inaugurated at Tel Aviv University in recognition of his commitment to the university.

== Death ==
Urs Felber died from a heart attack on 26 April 2010.
