= Rafael Arnaiz Barón =

Spanish saint of the Roman Catholic Church (1911–1938)

Saint Rafael Arnáiz Barón O.C.S.O.
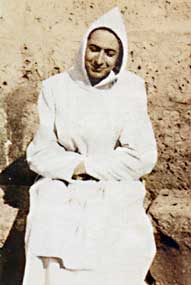

Religious
- Born: 9 April 1911; Burgos, Kingdom of Spain
- Died: 26 April 1938 (aged 27); Dueñas, Palencia, Second Spanish Republic
- Venerated in: Roman Catholic Church
- Beatified: 27 September 1992, Saint Peter's Square, Vatican City by Pope John Paul II
- Canonized: 11 October 2009, Saint Peter's Square, Vatican City by Pope Benedict XVI
- Major shrine: Abbey of San Isidro de Dueñas
- Feast: 27 April
- Attributes: Trappist habit
- Patronage: Diabetics; World Youth Day

Rafael Arnáiz Barón, OCSO (9 April 1911 – 26 April 1938), also named María Rafael in religion, was a Spanish Trappist conventual oblate. He studied architecture in Madrid, but decided to cease his studies in favor of the religious life. This was often interrupted due to his struggle with type 1 diabetes and his being called for active military service. But these never hindered his religious call and he did as best as he could to deal with his diabetes through his constant life of reflection and writing on spiritual subjects in his letters.

He was beatified on 27 September 1992 by Pope John Paul II and was canonized a saint of the Catholic Church by Pope Benedict XVI on 11 October 2009.

== Biography ==
Rafael Arnáiz Barón was born on 9 April 1911 in Burgos as the first of four sons to Rafael Arnáiz (an engineer) and Mercedes Barón (newspaper columnists); his siblings after him were Fernando, Leopoldo, and Mercedes. His baptism was celebrated on 21 April 1911 and he was named as "Rafael Arturo Alvaro José de la Immaculada Concepción i San Luis Gonzaga". He made his First Communion in Burgos on 25 October 1919.

In his childhood he went to several schools that the Jesuits ran and from October 1920 to 1922 was at one such college in Burgos where he was noted for his artistic talents; several bouts of fever often interrupted his studies. In his adolescence it was clear that he had a range of intellectual and artistic gifts as well as those of the spiritual nature. These qualities were well-balanced in him and it produced an open and positive attitude to people and things which was characterized with exuberant good humor and respect. In 1923 his parents relocated to Oviedo and he accompanied them so that he could attend the Jesuit college of San Ignacio where he graduated in 1929. On 26 April 1930 he began his architectural studies in Madrid though suspended it for a brief period of time in December 1930 after he had a bacterial infection. His mother - in April 1921 - took him to his maternal grandmother in Madrid to recover and he was there for a month. Once he recovered his father took him to Zaragoza in August 1921 to a church for him to be consecrated to the Mother of God.

Once he graduated from high school in 1930, he sought a deeper commitment to Jesus Christ. As a graduation present, he spent his summer vacation with his uncle Leopoldo and his aunt María who were the Duke and Duchess of Maqueda at their residence near Ávila. It marked the beginning of a deep and lasting friendship among them. At their encouragement he made his first contact that September with the Trappists of San Isidro de Dueñas in Palencia. He was attracted to the silence and was attracted to the Gregorian chant such as the Salve Regina that was sung at Compline. On 15 April 1934 - having finished his architectural studies he entered the order as a postulant and then became a novice; he was convinced that this was his true religious calling.

He suffered from a severe case of type I diabetes mellitus which developed four months after his entering the convent and was diagnosed on 26 May 1934. The saddened and perplexed novice was forced to rest at home for a few months before returning, which he did three successive times from 1935 through 1937 at the height of the Spanish Civil War (one occasion was from 29 September to 6 December 1936 and again from 7 February to 15 December 1937). He was called into the armed forces but was declared unfit for active service. On his final return to the convent - due to his medical condition - he was obliged to enter as a conventual oblate instead of as a monk, taking a lower place and living on the margins of the order; this circumstance revealed his intense vocational commitment. He received the habit on 17 April 1938 prior to his death and between December 1937 to April 1938 he had written 33 letters.

=== Death ===
On 22 April 1938, he suffered a high fever and became delirious at times due to that ailment; he saw his father for the last time on 21 April. He died from type I diabetes complications on 26 April 1938. His remains were relocated in 1965 and for the final time on 13 November 1972 into a small chapel. Pope John Paul II, on 19 August 1989 at World Youth Day in Santiago de Compostela, proposed him as a model for adolescents.

== Spirituality ==
He embodied the order's charism and grace in a pure and intense manner and allowed himself to be led through a series of bewildering contradictions and perplexities such as sickness and war as well as him being unable to pronounce his vows - he renounced himself and his self-will.

He lived with humiliation until in his death he attained the essence of monastic vows - though he was never allowed to profess them on an official level. To him, the figure of Christ was not the object of research but rather the companion of absolute love.

== Sainthood ==
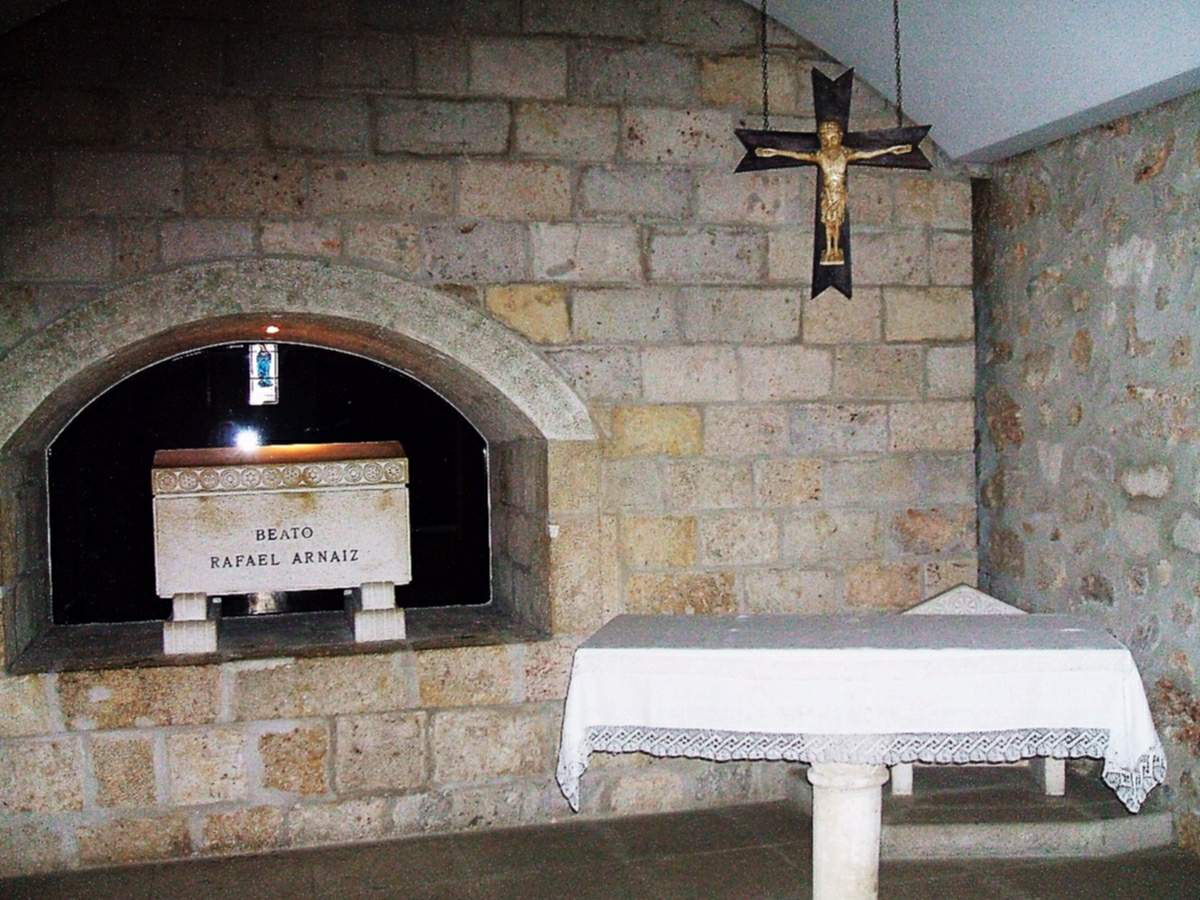
Tomb.

The sainthood process started in Palencia in an informative process that spanned from 28 June 1961 until 30 April 1967. Theologians agreed on 25 January 1974 that all of his spiritual writings were in full accordance with the norms of the faith. The formal introduction to the cause came later on 15 January 1983 and the late Trappist became titled as a Servant of God. The Congregation for the Causes of Saints (C.C.S.) validated the informative process in Rome on 26 June 1987 and received the Positio dossier in 1987. Theologians approved this dossier on 12 May 1989 as did the C.C.S. on 11 July 1989. The confirmation of his heroic virtue on 7 September 1989 allowed for Pope John Paul II to sign a decree that titled him as Venerable.

The process for a miracle took place in the location that it originated in and it received C.C.S. validation on 6 October 1989; a medical board approved it on 31 October 1991 as did the theologians on 4 March 1992 and the C.C.S. on 7 April 1992. John Paul II approved this miracle on 13 June 1992 and beatified the Trappist on 27 September 1992 in Saint Peter's Square.

The process for another miracle opened in Madrid and spanned from 9 April 2005 to 7 May 2006 before its validation on 30 November 2006. Medical experts assented to this on 13 March 2008 as well as theologians on 7 June 2008 and the C.C.S. members on 4 November 2008. Pope Benedict XVI approved this miracle on 6 December 2008 and formalized the date for the sainthood celebration in a consistory on 21 February 2009. Benedict XVI canonized him on 11 October 2009.

=== Canonization miracle ===
The miracle that led to the canonization was the January 2001 healing of Begoña Alonso Leon in Madrid. She was 30 and in the fifth month of being pregnant with her daughter Laura and began to feel severe contractions and headaches as well as signs of eclampsia. On 25 December 2000 - Christmas - she was admitted at seven months into a Madrid hospital due to the symptoms worsening and after an ultrasound was directed to the surgical theatre for a cesarean section. Her daughter was born in good health but Leon's condition worsened and she was in the intensive care unit for over two weeks. Her rapid healing after this was attributed to the late Trappist whom she appealed to during her illness.

== See also ==
- Abbey of San Isidro de Dueñas at Spanish Wikipedia
