= Nagoya Airfield =

Airport in Komaki, Aichi Prefecture, Japan

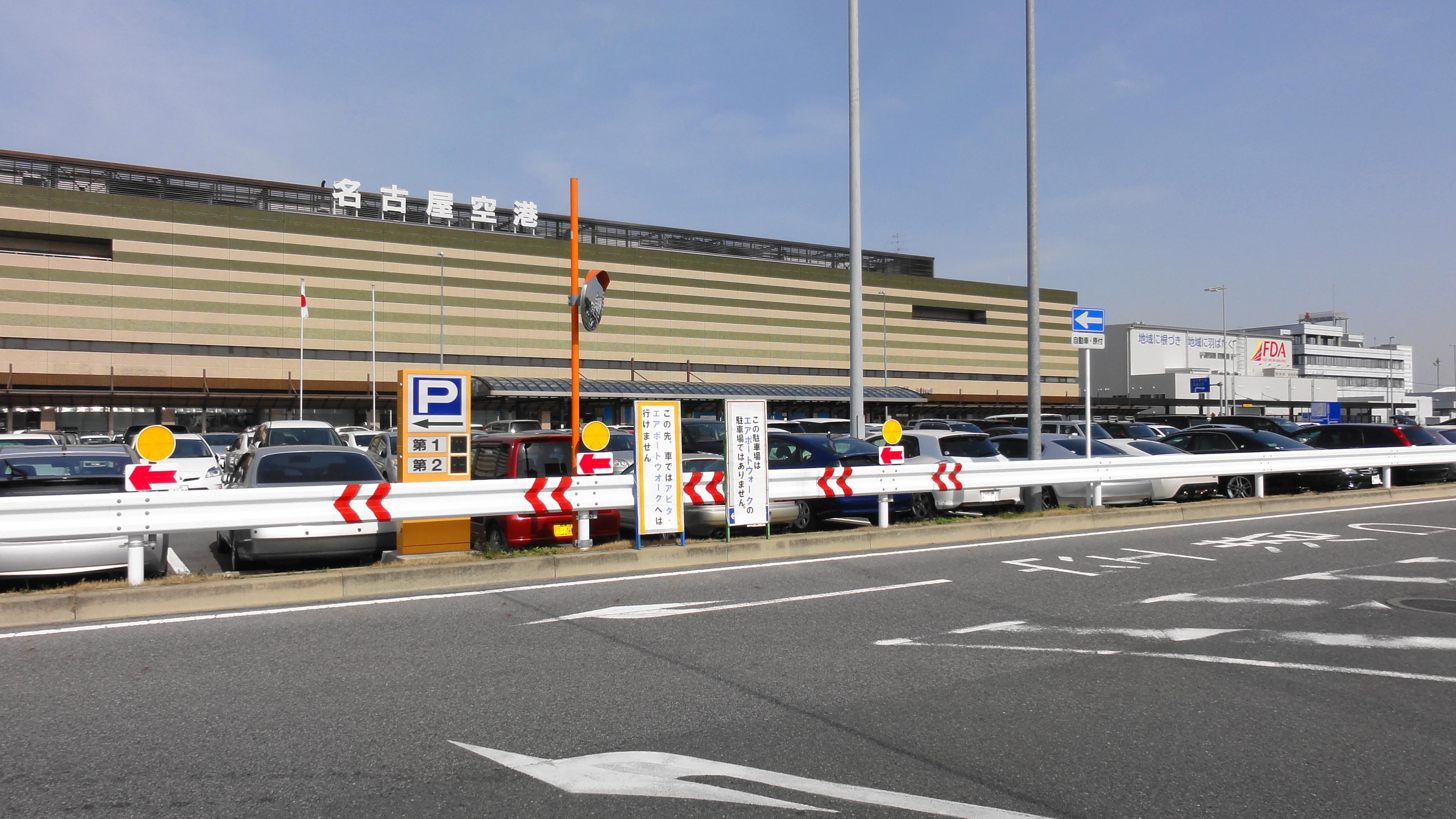
- Main terminal building
- IATA: NKM; ICAO: RJNA

Summary
- Airport type: Public / Military
- Serves: Chūkyō metropolitan area
- Location: Komaki, Aichi, Japan
- Opened: February 1, 1944; 82 years ago
- Operating base for: Fuji Dream Airlines
- Elevation AMSL: 46 ft (14 m)
- Coordinates: 35°15′18″N 136°55′28″E
- Website: www.nagoya-airport.jp

Map
- Location in Nagoya Location in Aichi Prefecture Location in Japan

Runways
Direction	Length		Surface
Direction	m	ft	Surface
16/34	2,800	9,186	Asphalt

Statistics (2015)
- Passengers: 735,114
- Cargo (metric tonnes): 0
- Aircraft movement: 42,449
- Source: Japanese Ministry of Land, Infrastructure, Transport and Tourism

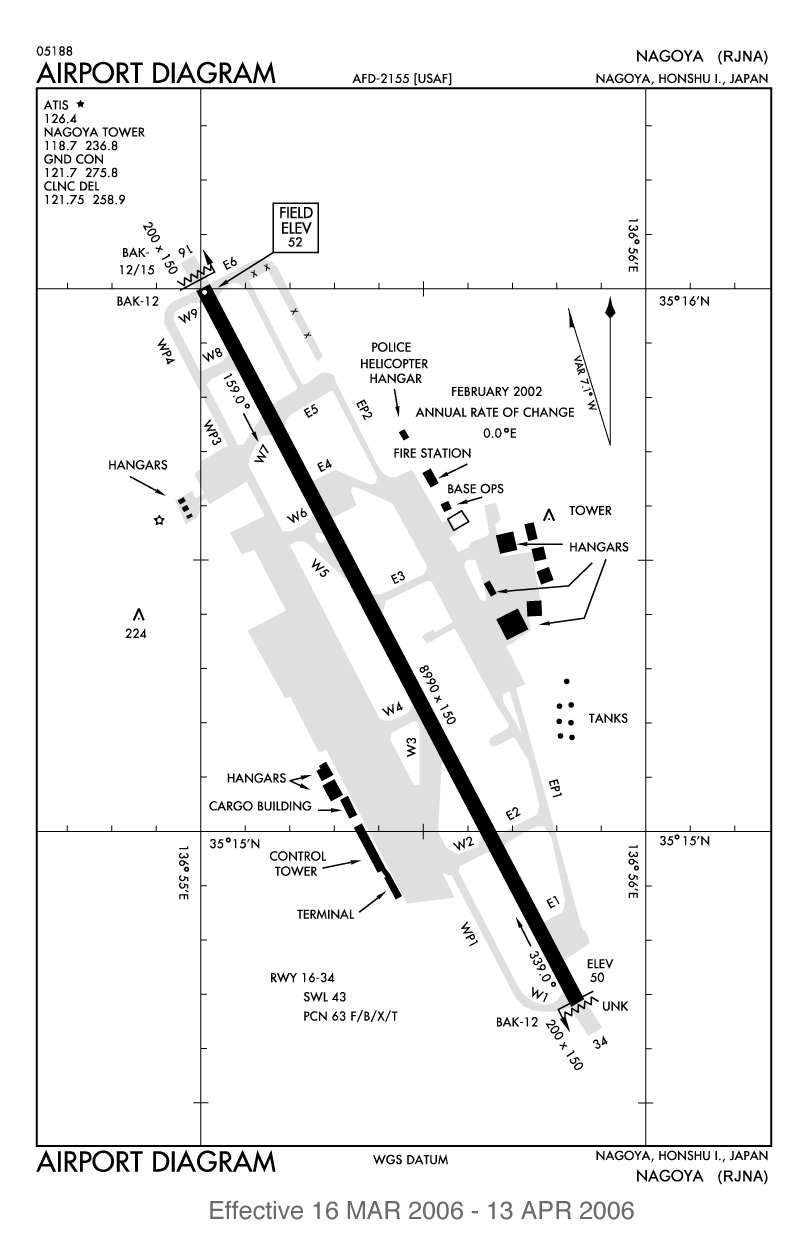
Airport Diagram

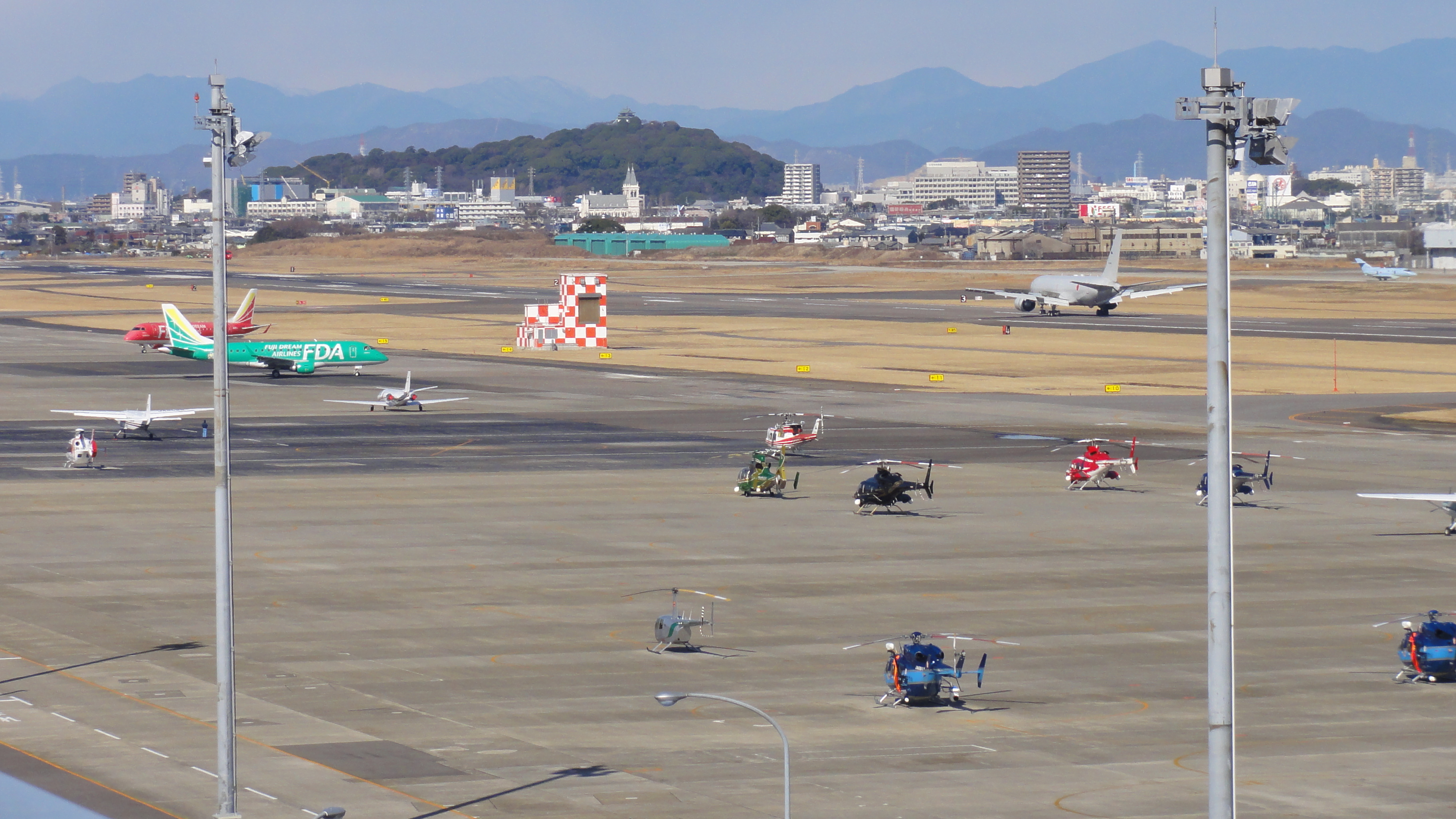
View from Airport Walk towards the field (2010)

Nagoya Airfield (名古屋飛行場, Nagoya Hikōjō) (IATA: NKM, ICAO: RJNA), also known as Komaki Airport or Nagoya Airport, is an airport within the local government areas of Toyoyama, Komaki, Kasugai and Nagoya in Aichi Prefecture of the Chuubu region in Japan. Prior to 2005, the location operated as an international airport, when the newly-built Chūbu Centrair International Airport in Tokoname claimed the operations. The airfield now serves as a secondary airport and offers limited domestic service.

Nagoya Airfield is the main operating base for FDA (Fuji Dream Airlines), the only airline that offers scheduled air service from the airfield. It is also used for general aviation and by Japan Self-Defense Forces as an airbase.

Mitsubishi Aircraft Corporation is headquartered in the airport's terminal building, and its parent company Mitsubishi Heavy Industries produced the Mitsubishi Regional Jet aircraft at a factory adjacent to the airport.

== Alternate names ==
- "Nagoya Airfield" is the name as the Ministry of Land, Infrastructure, Transport and Tourism of the national government, as of 2008, recognizes it as an "other airport".
- The airfield was Nagoya Airport (名古屋空港, Nagoya Kūkō) until the opening of Centrair on February 17, 2005.
- It has been conventionally called Komaki Airport (小牧空港, Komaki Kūkō).
- Aichi Prefectural Government, the current owner of the airport, nicknames it Prefectural Nagoya Airport (県営名古屋空港, Ken-ei Nagoya Kūkō).
- The Japan Self-Defense Forces shares the runway as a part of Japan Air Self-Defence Force Komaki Base (航空自衛隊小牧基地, Kōkū Jiei-tai Komaki Kichi). The four Boeing KC-767J tankers of the 404th Tactical Airlift Tanker Squadron are based there.

== History ==
Nagoya Airport served as the main airport for Nagoya until the opening of Chubu Centrair International Airport on February 17, 2005. This airport IATA Airport Code used to be NGO (now overtaken by the new Centrair airport), and its ICAO Airport Code used to be RJNN when it was classified as a second class airport; the new designations are NKM for regional flights and RJNA designation for general aviation flights. Aichi Prefecture manages the facilities and regularly handles international business flights.

During the 1980s and early 1990s, Nagoya Airport was a busy international airport because of overflow from Japan's other international airports, New Tokyo International Airport (now Narita International Airport) near Tokyo and Osaka International Airport (Itami Airport) near Osaka.

Since the opening of Kansai International Airport in 1994, the airport's main traffic source has been the nearby automotive and manufacturing industries, causing carriers such as United Airlines (San Francisco and Chicago–O'Hare) and Delta Air Lines (Portland (OR)) to stop flying to Nagoya. Some discount holiday flights still operated from Nagoya, drawing passengers from the Kansai region. On the other hand, the cargo handling capacity of Nagoya Airport was not enough to satisfy the demands from the regional economy and air cargo shifted to Narita and Kansai. In addition, the airport was hampered by its location in a residential area of Aichi Prefecture, limiting the number of flights that can use the airport, as well as the hours in which they can fly.

Because of these reasons, a new airport, Chubu Centrair International Airport, was built on an island south of Nagoya. On February 17, 2005, nearly all of Nagoya Airport's commercial transport flights moved to Centrair. On the same day, the old airport became a general aviation and airbase facility. The airport was also renamed to its current name at the same time. It also became J-Air's headquarters and hub after relocation from Hiroshima-Nishi Airport. The airline continued to operate through the airport until 2011 as the result of corporate restructuring of its parent company Japan Airlines resulted in the airline's departure from the airport and moving its operation base to Itami Airport in Osaka. At the same time after J-Air's departure, Fuji Dream Airlines opened a base at the airport and was the only airline to fly from the airport since then. A dedicated business aviation terminal and commuter flights within Japan then became the key features of Nagoya's secondary airport. The Aichi Museum of Flight opened at the airport in November 2017.

=== Military use ===
==== Imperial Period ====
Nagoya Airport was first opened in 1944 as a military airport named Kamake Airfield. It was primarily used as the home base of the 55th Sentai of the Imperial Japanese Army Air Service. As such, it was attacked on several occasions during the Pacific War in 1944 and 1945 by USAAF B-29 Superfortress bombing raids.

==== U.S. period ====
After the end of World War II, the airfield was taken over by the American occupation forces and renamed Nagoya Air Base. Reconstruction of the heavily damaged airfield began and in May 1946, Nagoya became the headquarters of the Fifth Air Force, which controlled Air Force occupation units throughout Japan. In December 1950 during the Korean War, Fifth Air Force headquarters was moved to South Korea; however, it returned to Nagoya Air Base in September 1954 and remained until July 1957 when it moved to Fuchu Air Station in Tokyo as part of the USAF return of Nagoya Airport to Japanese control.

The U.S. primarily used Nagoya Air Base as a headquarters station for the next ten years, stationing several command and control units at the base:

- 308th Bombardment Wing, 1 Mar 1947-30 Jun 1948

Moved to Nagoya in March from Kimpo Air Base, South Korea where it had been performing occupation duty since moving there from Okinawa in September 1945

- 85th Fighter Wing, 1 Jun 1947-30 Jun 1948

Moved from the Philippines to set up an air defense organization in Japan.

- 314th Air Division, 1 Dec 1950-1 Mar 1952

Activated at Nagoya. During the Korean War it assumed the missions of airfield construction and defense of Japan as well as providing logistical support for the Fifth Air Force.

Operational use from the airfield began in February 1947 when the 347th Fighter Group (All Weather) began operating P-61 Black Widow interceptor aircraft, which were used to provide air defense for Japan. It operated from the airfield until June 1950 when the Black Widows were retired and the unit was inactivated.

After the Armistice in South Korea which ended combat, the 49th Fighter Group moved to Nagoya Air Base with F-84 Thunderjets. The unit provided air defense until June 1957 when it moved to Misawa Air Base.

The 6110th Air Base Group, which had maintained the base and the myriad of ground support units at the base since the Americans moved in during 1946 began phasing down after July 1957. The 6110th USAF Hospital remained open until 30 June 1958 when the last Americans left Nagoya Airfield and it was returned to Japanese control.

==== Japan Self-Defense Force ====
In 2009 the first dedicated air-to-air refueling squadron of the Japan Air Self-Defense Force was formed at Komaki. Named the 404th Tactical Airlift Tanker Squadron, it is equipped with Boeing KC-767J aircraft.

== Tenant squadrons ==
- Japan Air Self-Defense Force
  - 401st Tactical Airlift Squadron (Lockheed C-130H/KC-130H)
  - 404th Tactical Airlift Tanker Squadron (Boeing KC-767J)(2009–)

== Airlines and destinations ==
Airlines	Destinations
Fuji Dream Airlines	Aomori, Fukuoka, Hanamaki, Izumo, Kōchi, Kumamoto, Niigata, Sapporo–Okadama, Yamagata

== Buses ==
=== Stage Carriage Coach ===
Airport Terminal Bus stop

Name	Via	Destination	Company	Note
Airport bus	Sakae Station	Nagoya Station	Aoi Kōtsū	
Airport bus	Ajiyoshi Station	Kachigawa Station	Aoi Kōtsū	
Nishiharu Kūkō Line		Nishiharu Station	Meitetsu Bus	
Ken´ei Nagoya Kūkō Line	Sakae Station	Meitetsu Nagoya Station	Meitetsu Bus	
Ken´ei Nagoya Kūkō Line	Non stop	Aichi Museum of Flight	Meitetsu Bus	

Toyoyamachō Shakaikyōiku Center Bus stop

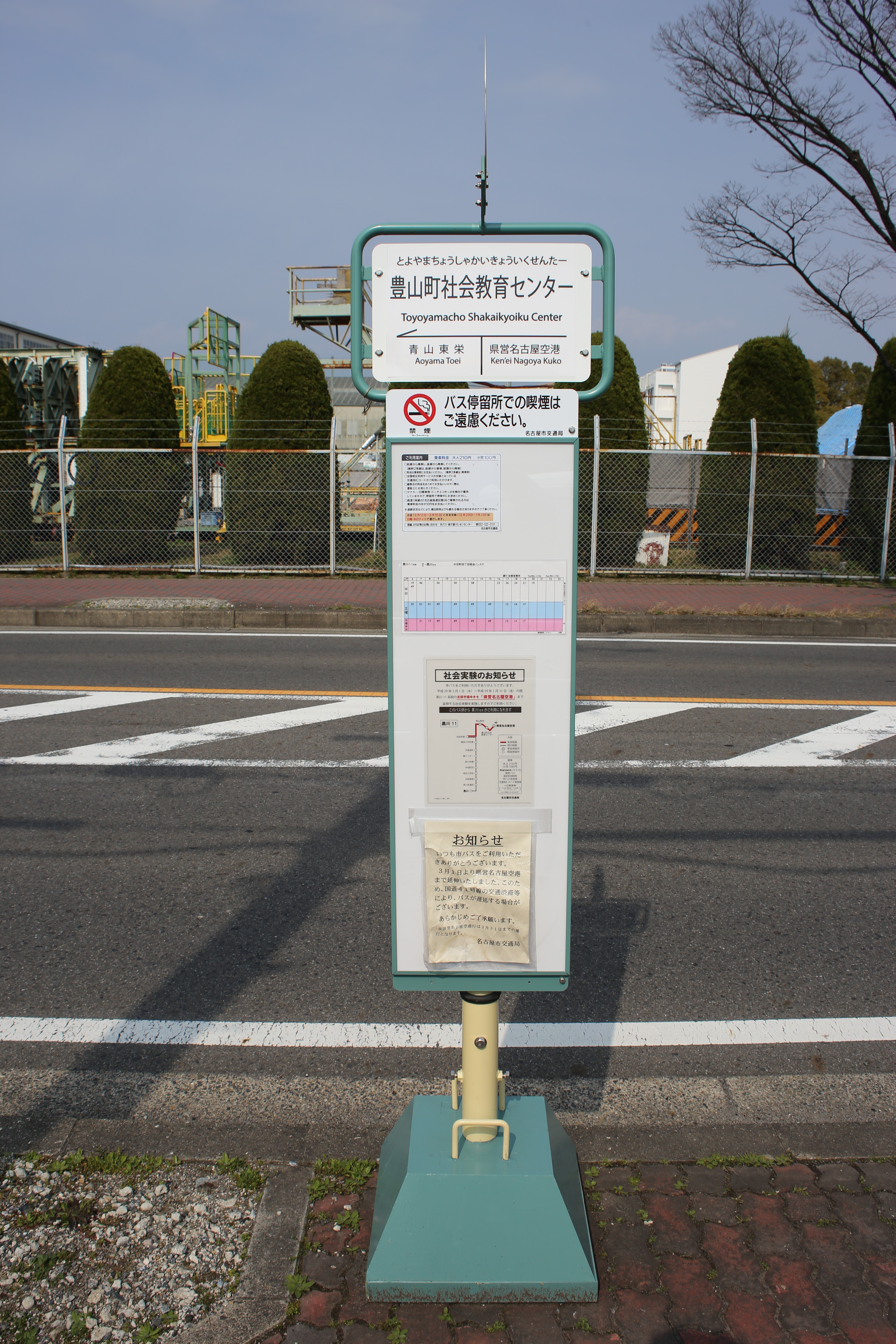
Toyoyamachō Shakaikyōiku Center Bus stop

Name	Via	Destination	Company	Note
South Route	Nagoyajo Station・Kurokawa Station	Sakae Station	Toyoyama Municipal Bus (Aoi Kōtsū)	
South Route	Non stop	Aichi Museum of Flight	Toyoyama Municipal Bus (Aoi Kōtsū)	

== Incidents and accidents ==
- On April 26, 1994, an Airbus A300B4-622R jet operating as China Airlines Flight 140 (B-1816) from Taipei to Nagoya crashed onto the south-east corner of the airport apron whilst trying to land on Runway 34, killing 264 of the 271 people on board. It is the second deadliest crash on Japanese soil, after Japan Air Lines Flight 123.
- On October 31, 2007, a Mitsubishi F-2 fighter jet, whilst on a test flight, crashed and exploded in flames during takeoff. Both pilots survived the incident with minor injuries.
- On May 30, 2015, Solar Impulse 2, part of a Swiss long-range experimental solar-powered aircraft project, made an emergency landing after diverting due to weather en route from Nanjing Lukou International Airport in China to Kalaeloa Airport in Hawaii; it continued to Hawaii on 28 June.

== See also ==
- Kawasaki Ki-61
