= 911th Air Refueling Squadron =

United States Air Force Reserve squadron

911th Air Refueling Squadron

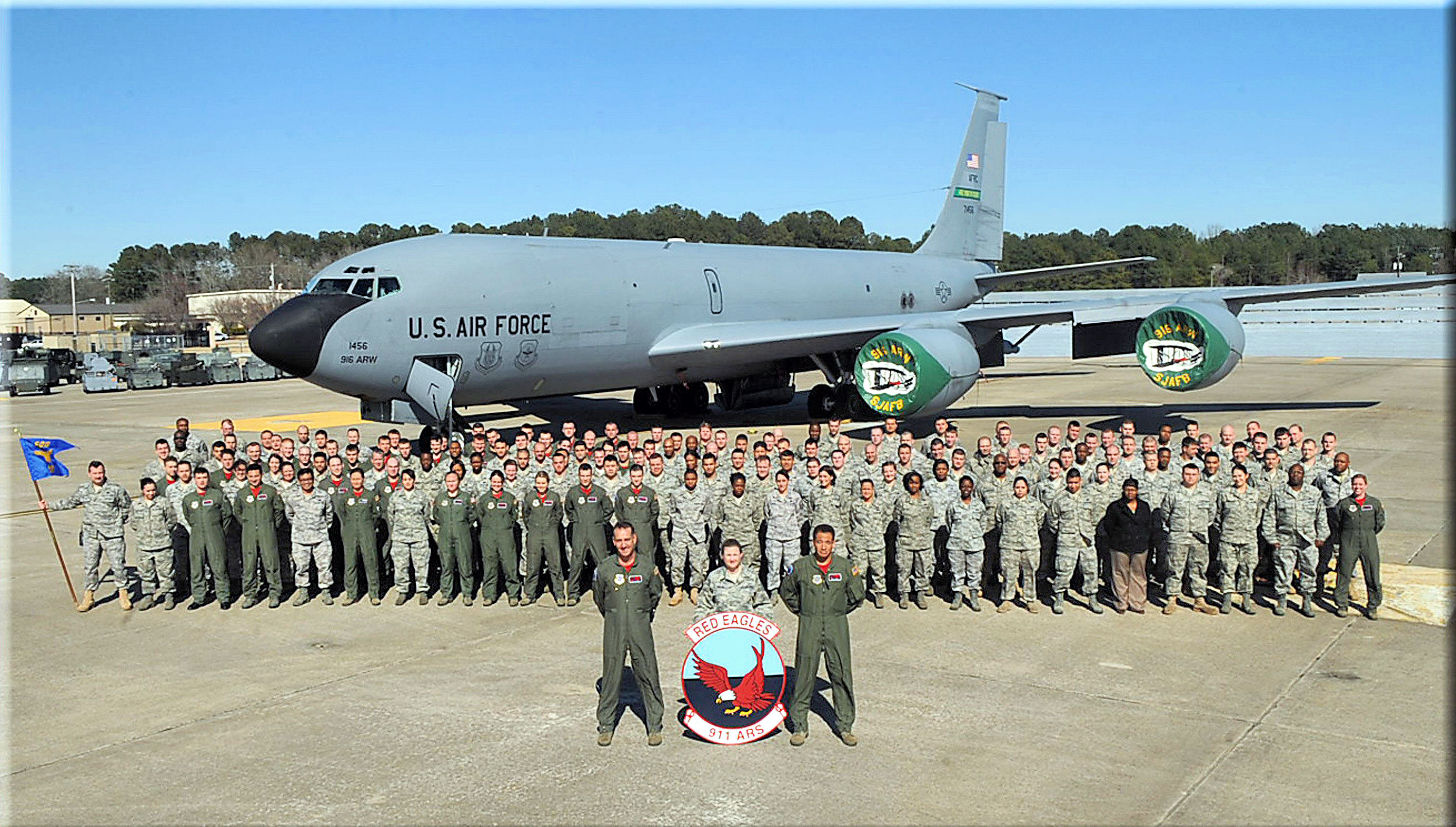
- The 911th Air Refueling Squadron
- Active: 1917–1919; 1923–1933; 1935–1946; 1958–2007; 2008 – present
- Country: United States
- Branch: United States Air Force
- Role: Air Refueling
- Size: 260 persons
- Part of: Air Mobility Command
- Garrison/HQ: Seymour Johnson Air Force Base, North Carolina
- Motto: First in Flight
- Engagements: Pacific Ocean theater of World War II
- Decorations: Distinguished Unit Citation; Air Force Outstanding Unit Award

Insignia
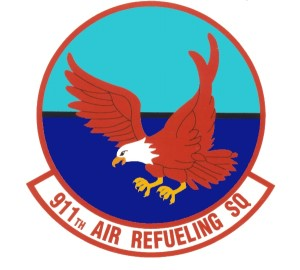
- 911th Air Refueling Squadron emblem (Note: Approved 16 November 1994. Description: Per fess Celeste and Azure a barrulet Sable and overall an eagle stooping Gules, head and feet proper all within a diminished bordure of the fourth [mentioned color]. Endicott, p. 890.)

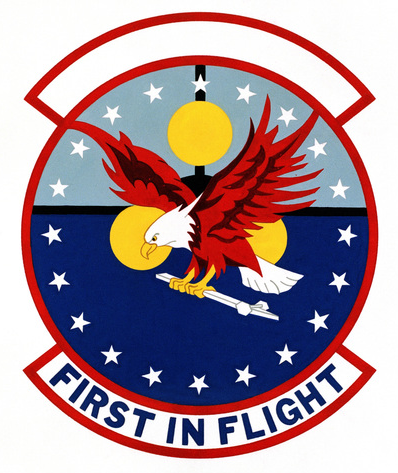
- 911th Air Refueling Squadron emblem (Note: Approved 24 July 1987.)

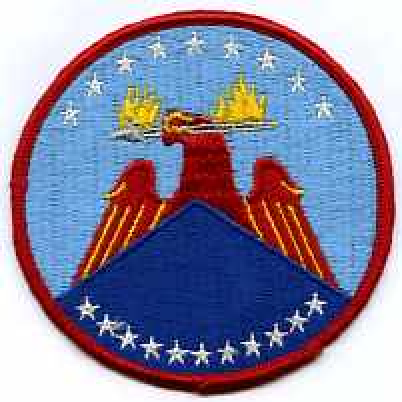
- Patch with old 911th Air Refueling Sq emblem

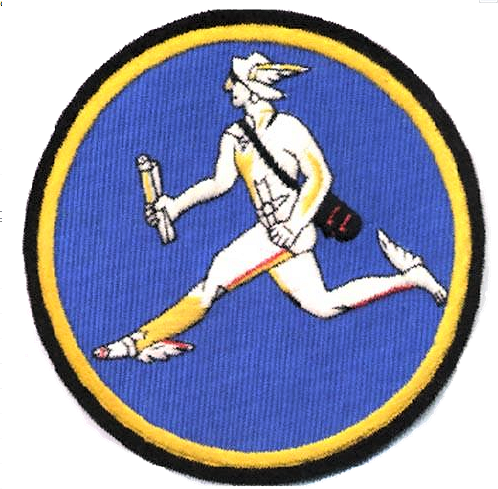
- Patch with 411th Bombardment Squadron emblem (Note: Approved 7 August 1937. Description: On an ultramarine blue circle within a gold border a representation of the Greek god Mercury (figure proper; helmet, sandals, and purse brown; wings and scroll white.)

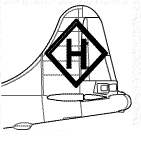
- 411th Bombardment Squadron Tail Marking (Pacific)

The 911th Air Refueling Squadron is part of the 305th Operations Group, and is stationed at Seymour Johnson Air Force Base, North Carolina. The squadron was the Air Force's first active duty squadron under the command of a reserve wing. In October 2016, the 911th, formerly geographically separated from the 6th Air Mobility Wing at MacDill Air Force Base, Florida and operated as the active duty associate to the 916th Air Refueling Wing, became the first "I-Wing" or Integrated Wing. In July 2020, it was reassigned to the 305th Operations Group at the McGuire AFB entity of Joint Base McGuire–Dix–Lakehurst, New Jersey.

The squadron is one of the oldest in the United States Air Force. Its origins date to 15 May 1917, when it was organized at Kelly Field, Texas. The 21st Aero Squadron served in France as part of the 3d Aviation Instruction Center, American Expeditionary Forces, as a pilot training squadron during World War I.

The squadron was activated as the 21st Observation Squadron in 1923, but received few, if any, personnel before being disbanded in 1933. In 1935 a new 21st Observation Squadron was organized at Langley Field, Virginia. (Note: The squadrons were consolidated in 1936. See Lineage Section for details.) In 1939, it moved to Florida and began to fly Neutrality Patrol missions over the adjacent waters.

After the attack on Pearl Harbor it flew antisubmarine patrols in the Gulf of Mexico and off the Atlantic Coast. It then became a heavy bomber training unit until 1999. In 1944 it converted to Boeing B-29 Superfortresses and saw combat in the Pacific during World War II, where it was awarded a Distinguished Unit Citation for its actions during the strategic bombing campaign against Japan.

It became part of Strategic Air Command (SAC) during the Cold War, maintaining a portion of its strength on alert. It frequently deployed a portion of the unit to support SAC operations, including combat operations in Southeast Asia. Members of the squadron participated Operation Enduring Freedom and Operation Iraqi Freedom. In 1991 it transferred to Air Combat Command as the United States Air Force reassigned and combined units to maintain a single wing on each base. It continued to support contingency operations after transferring to Air Mobility Command until it was inactivated in 2007.

Today, the squadron operates the Boeing KC-46 "Pegasus" aircraft conducting air refueling missions worldwide as an active component of the Air Force's first Integrated Wing, flying the aircraft of the reserve 916th Air Refueling Wing.

== History ==
=== World War I ===
The 911th Air Refueling Squadron traces its origins to early May 1917 when newly arrived recruits arrived at Kelly Field, Texas and were formed into 1st Company "B", 1st Regiment, Kelly Field. On 15 May these recruits became the 16th Aero Squadron. However, on 13 June it was redesignated as the 21st Aero Squadron.

When the first soldiers arrived at Kelly, there were no tents or cots for them so they slept on the ground. When the first tents arrived, the men were assigned locations for them and pitched them. The men received their indoctrination into the Army as soldiers, standing guard duty and other rudimentary duties. The lack of sanitary facilities and of uniforms meant most men worked in the civilian clothing they arrived in. They slept in them without bathing until latrines and washing facilities were constructed. The men dug ditches for water mains and erected wooden buildings for barracks. On 4 August, the squadron was ordered to proceed to Scott Field, near Belleville, Illinois, arriving on the 11th. There the squadron worked with the 11th Aero Squadron, preparing the field for training. Training was received in various aircraft engines, and the men were classified as mechanics.

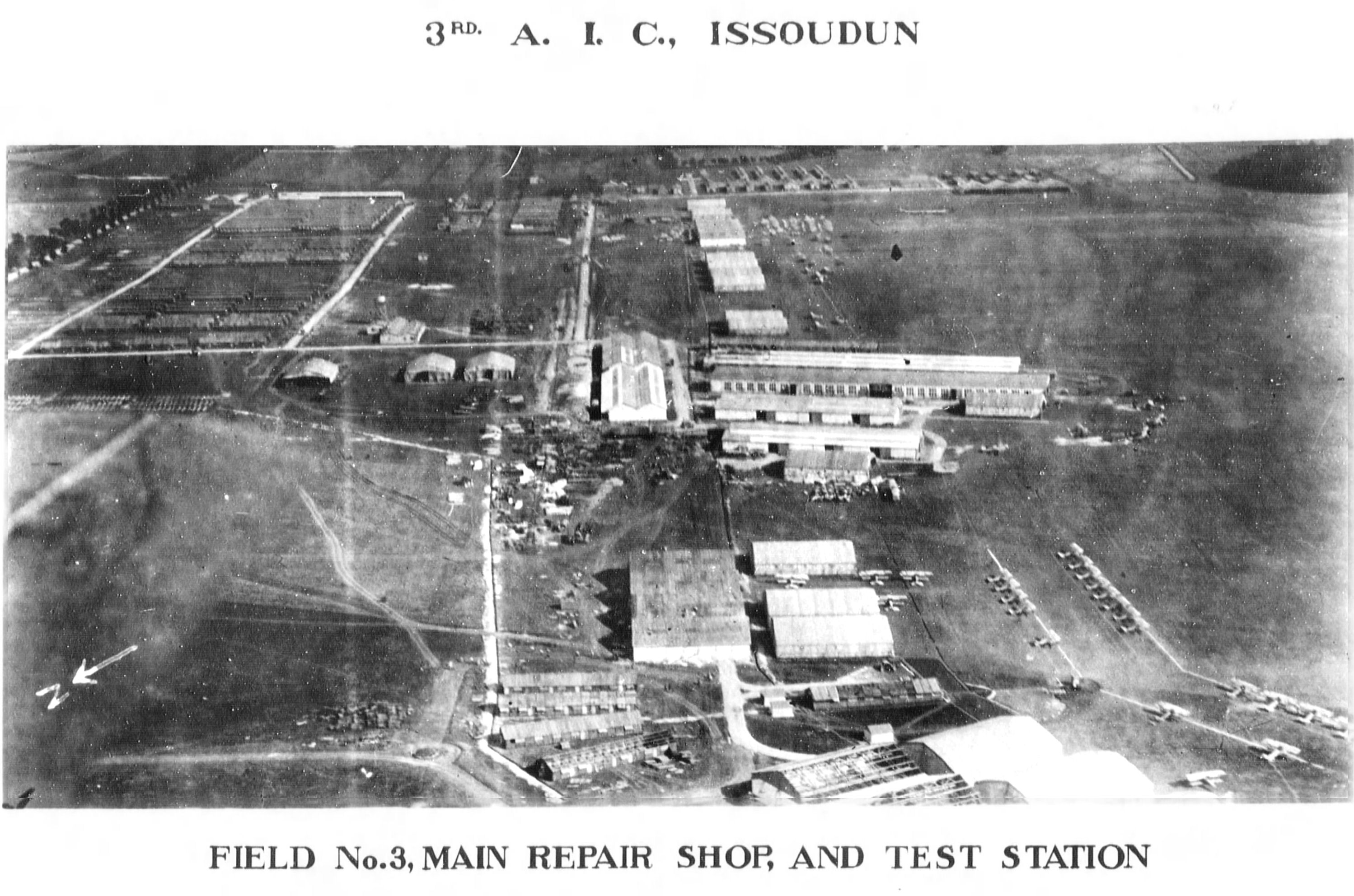
3d Aviation Instructional Center, Field #3, Issoudun Aerodrome, France, 1918

In November the squadron received orders for overseas duty. However, an epidemic of sickness put the 21st into quarantine status. It remained quarantined until 21 December when it was cleared by the medical department to move to the Aviation Concentration Center, Garden City, Long Island, arriving on the 23d. It was not long before the squadron was ordered to proceed to the New York Port of Embarkation at Hoboken, New Jersey, where the squadron sailed for France on 4 January 1918, arriving at Saint-Nazaire on the 17th. After a few days at a rest camp, it traveled by train to the Air Service Replacement Concentration Center, located at the St. Maixent Replacement Barracks, arriving on 23 January. The 21st was classified as a school squadron, and was ordered to proceed to the 3d Aviation Instructional Center (3d AIC) at Issoudun Aerodrome. It arrived at Issoudun on 21 February.

==== 3d Aviation Instruction Center ====
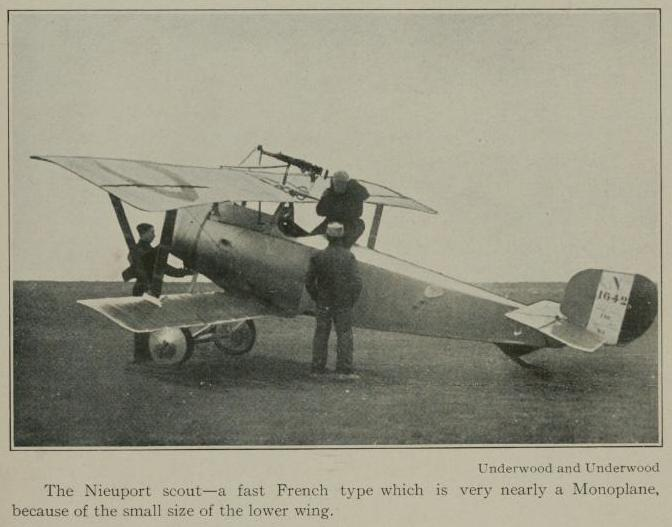
French Nieuport 21

The 3d Aviation Instruction Center was established by the Training Section, American Expeditionary Forces (AEF) to train pursuit (fighter) pilots prior to their assignment to combat on the front. The 21st Aero Squadron (School), was assigned to Issoudun Field #7, where Nieuport 28 aircraft were used for formation flying training. On 18 March, it moved to the main camp, where Fields #1, #2 and #3 were used for initial training in Nieuport 15s and 18s and 21s. When additional squadrons of mechanics arrived, the 21st concentrated at Field #3 and on maintaining the school's Nieuport 21s. The field strength grew until nearly 100 airplanes were in use, with solo flying, cross-country flying, and basic aerobatics being taught. The squadron handled all of these. The 21st's efficiency was commented on by the post commander when a record was established with 69 launches on one day, with several hundred hours of flying recorded.Training was given to many members of the pursuit squadrons of the First Army Air Service as they arrived in France; and beginning in August 1918, to new pilots for the planned Second Army Air Service as they began to arrive for training.

At the time of the Armistice on 11 November, the men of the 21st Aero Squadron remained on duty completing the training of the pilots assigned to Field #3. Although it did not enter combat, the unit trained the men who went to the front and gave them the best of training so they might accomplish their work.

==== Demobilization ====
The AEF was notoriously slow in returning men to the United States after the end of hostilities, and men who served on the front had priority over those who served in the rear areas. The 21st, therefore, remained at Issoudun until January 1919 when orders were received to proceed to the 1st Air Depot, Colombey-les-Belles Airdrome, France, for demobilization. From Colombey, the squadron moved to a staging camp under the Services of Supply at Bordeaux, waiting for a date to board a troop ship for transportation home. On 18 March, the squadron boarded a troop ship, arriving in New York on 5 April. From there, the 21st moved to Hazelhurst Field, New York where the men were demobilized and returned to civilian life. The 21st Aero Squadron itself was demobilized on 14 April.

=== Inter-war years ===
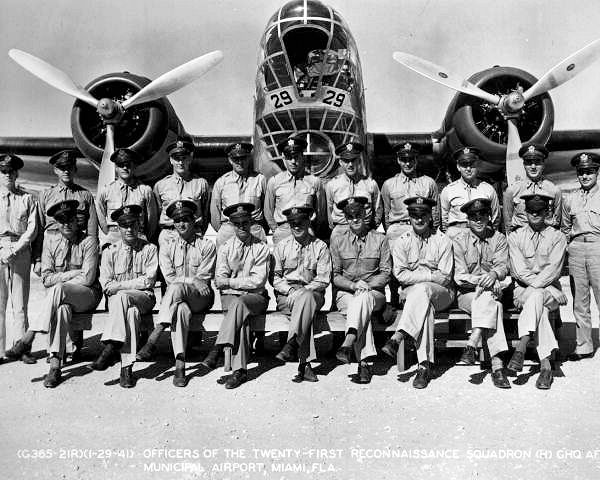
Squadron members and a B-18 Bolo of the 21st Reconnaissance Squadron at Miami Municipal Airport, Florida, 1941

On 24 March 1923, the 21st Aero Squadron was reconstituted as the 21st Observation Squadron of the United States Army Air Service. The Army activated the unit as a "Regular Army Inactive" squadron, meaning that although it was a Regular Army unit, it was manned with reserve personnel. It was assigned to the 9th Observation Group in the Sixth Corps Area. The 21st's designated Active Associate unit was the 15th Observation Squadron, at Chanute Field, Illinois, which was also its designated mobilization station. In 1927 it was withdrawn from the Sixth Corps Area and reassigned to the Fourth Corps Area. Its designated mobilization station during this period was Carlstrom Field, Florida, a training field. In 1928, it was moved to the Eighth Corps Area at Dodd Field, Texas, which was also designated as its mobilization station. It was not organized at Dodd and it was disbanded on 1 October 1933.

The 21st Observation Squadron (Long Range Amphibian) was activated on 1 March 1935 at Bolling Field, District of Columbia and was assigned to the 2d Wing. In 1936 it was consolidated with the earlier 21st Observation Squadron. The 21st Observation Squadron flew light reconnaissance aircraft in support of Army maneuvers primarily in northern Virginia. The squadron operated land-based aircraft as well as amphibian seaplanes using the Potomac River for landings and takeoffs. In 1936 it moved to Langley Field, Virginia and was equipped with heavier attack aircraft as well as medium bombers.

The squadron was redesignated a long range reconnaissance squadron and received early model Boeing B-17C/D Flying Fortresses and Douglas B-18 Bolos in 1939. It moved to the 36th Street Airport, Miami, Florida, where it was attached to the Navy and began to fly Neutrality Patrol, sea search, and weather reconnaissance missions. It operated from several locations along the Atlantic Coast, flying coastal patrol missions. On 3 September 1941 it was attached to the 29th Bombardment Group at MacDill Field, Florida, flying antisubmarine patrols from various locations in south Florida over the Gulf of Mexico and the Florida Straits along the Atlantic Coast.

=== World War II ===
==== Heavy Bomber training ====
After the attack on Pearl Harbor the squadron remained in south Florida flying antisubmarine patrols against any German U-boats approaching the United States coast.

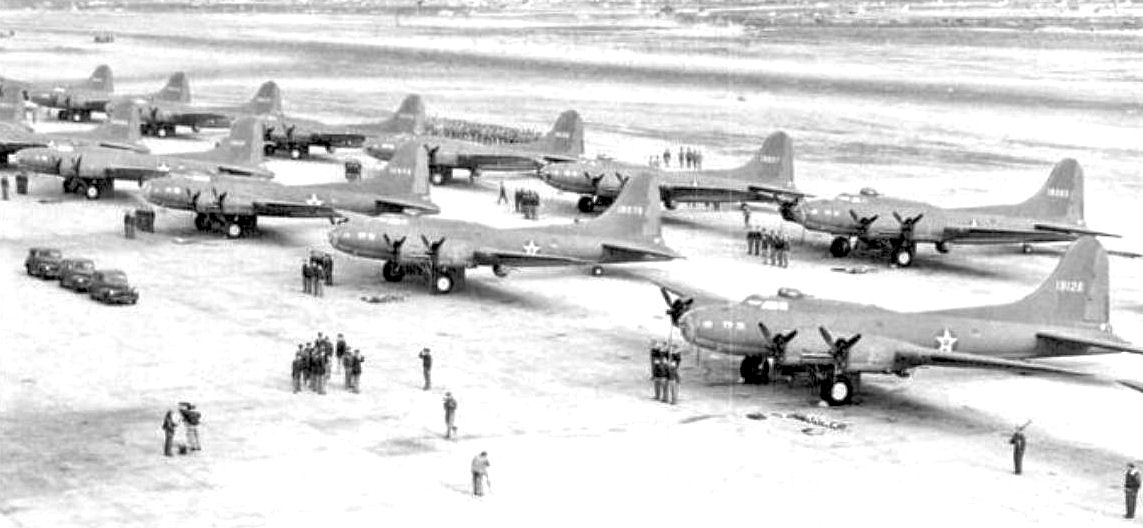
411th Bombardment Squadron B-17E Flying Fortresses at Gowen Field, Idaho, 1943

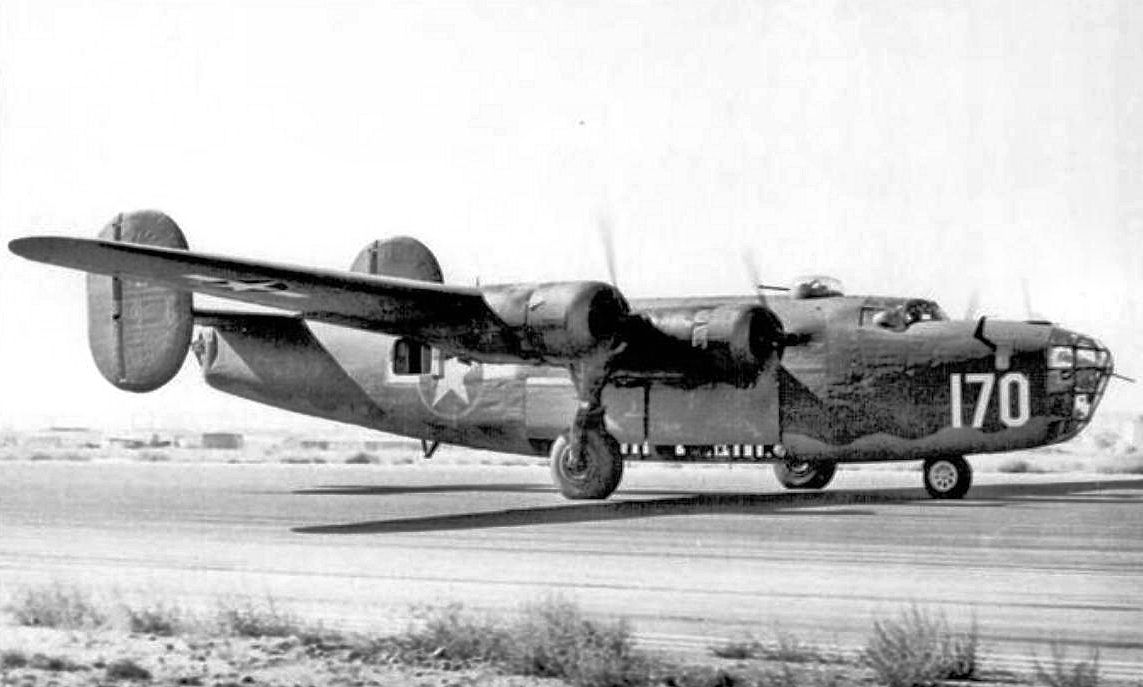
411th Bombardment Squadron B-24E Liberator at Gowen Field, Idaho, 1943.

On 1 February 1942, the 21st was finally assigned to the 29th Bombardment Group. (Note: It had been attached to the group since 1941.) In June 1942, I Bomber Command took over the antisubmarine mission and the 21st became part of II Bomber Command. It was redesignated as the 411th Bombardment Squadron and moved to Gowen Field, Idaho. At Gowen, the squadron was an Operational Training Unit (OTU), first with Boeing B-17 Flying Fortresses and, after 1943, with Consolidated B-24 Liberators.

The OTU program involved the use of an oversized parent unit to provide cadres to "satellite groups" prior to their deployment overseas. In 1943, the squadron became a Replacement Training Unit (RTU). The RTU was also an oversized unit. but if focused on training individual pilots or aircrews. However, the Army Air Forces found that standard military units, based on relatively inflexible tables of organization, were proving less well adapted to the training mission. Accordingly, it adopted a more functional system in which each base was organized into a separate numbered unit, while the groups and squadrons acting as RTUs were disbanded or inactivated. This resulted in the 411th, along with other units at Gowen, being inactivated in April 1944 and being replaced by the 212th Army Air Forces Base Unit (Combat Crew Training School, Heavy).

==== B-29 Superfortress operations against Japan ====
The 411th Bombardment Squadron was activated the same day as a Boeing B-29 Superfortress squadron at Pratt Army Air Field, Kansas. However, a little over a month later, it was inactivated again as the Army Air Forces began to reorganize its very heavy bomber groups from four squadron units to three squadron units.

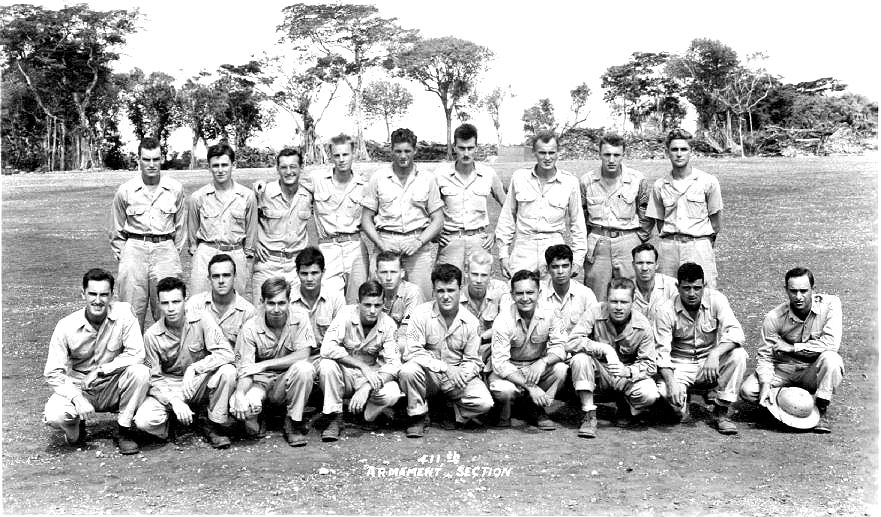
411th Bombardment Squadron, Armament Section, Northwest Field, Guam, 1945

The squadron was activated again on 1 June 1944 as part of the new 502d Bombardment Group (Very Heavy), which was being organized at Davis-Monthan Field, Arizona. It began training with B-29s at Dalhart Army Air Field, Texas. In September, the air echelon deployed to Orlando Army Air Base in Florida for a concentrated course on very heavy bombardment tactics, while the ground echelon preceded it to its new training base at Grand Island Army Air Field, Nebraska where the squadron prepared for overseas deployment.

After completing training the squadron deployed to the central Pacific and became part of XXI Bomber Command at Northwest Field (Guam) for operational missions. The mission of the squadron was the strategic bombardment of the Japanese Home Islands. It entered combat on 30 June 1945 with a bombing raid against enemy installations on Rota. It bombed Truk in early July. It flew its first mission against the Japanese home islands on 15 July 1945 against the oil refinery at Kudamatsu and afterwards operated principally against the enemy's petroleum industry. The squadron earned a Distinguished Unit Citation for August 1945 attacks on the coal liquefaction plant at Ube, a tank farm at Amagasaki and the Nippon Oil refinery at Tsuchizaki.

After the surrender of Japan the squadron dropped food and supplies to Allied prisoners of war in Japan and later flew in show of force missions. It was inactivated on Guam 15 April 1946.

=== Strategic Air Command ===
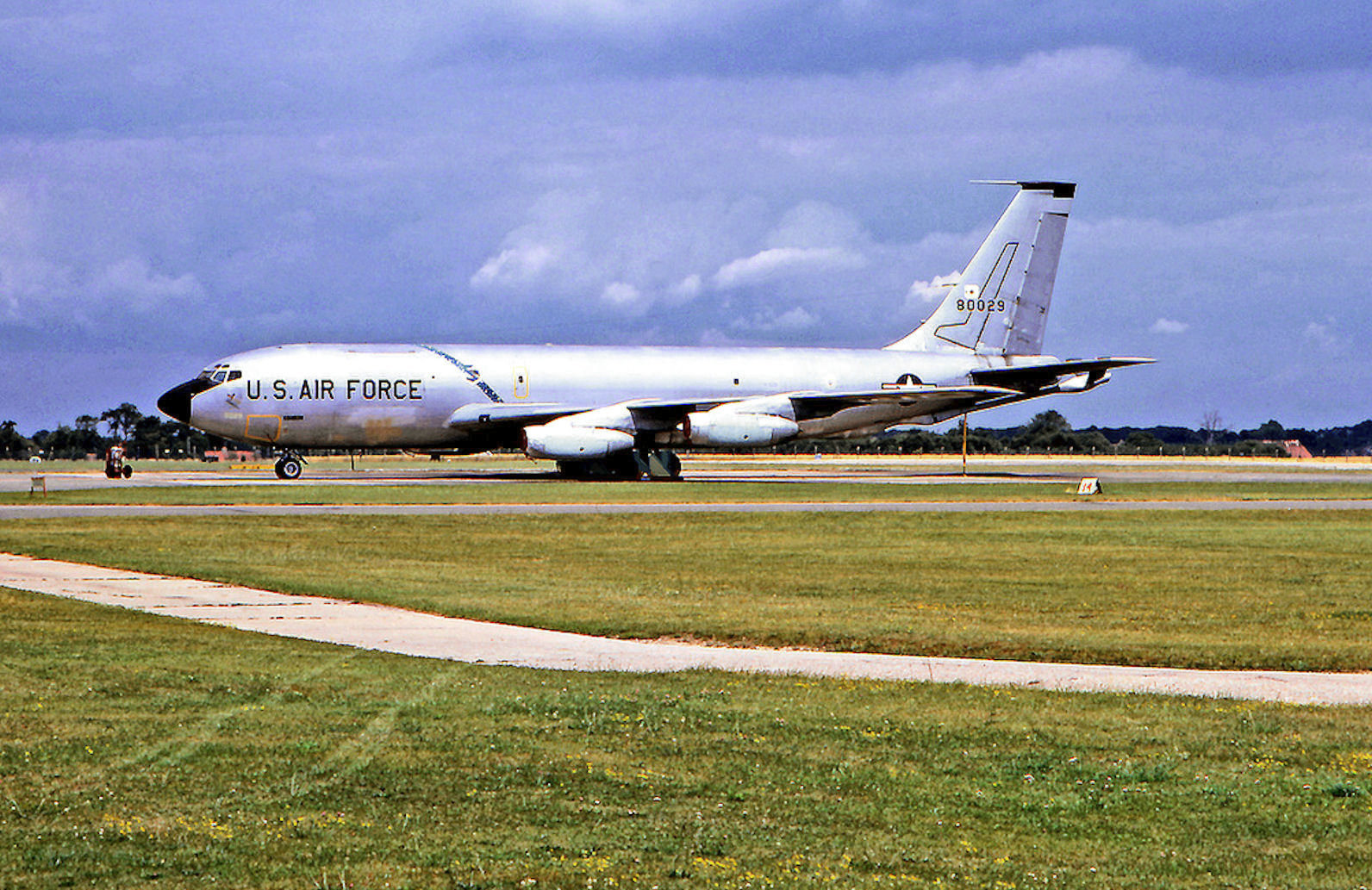
Squadron KC-135A Stratotanker (Note: Aircraft is Boeing KC-135A-BN Stratotanker, serial 58-029. This plane was transferred to the Aerospace Maintenance and Regeneration Center on 2 December 1992. Baugher, Joe (17 February 2023). "1958 USAF Serial Numbers". Joe Baugher. Taken circa 1975.)

The 911th Air Refueling Squadron, Heavy was organized on 1 December 1958 at Seymour Johnson Air Force Base, North Carolina. The squadron was equipped with first generation Boeing KC-135A Stratotankers as part of the 4241st Strategic Wing, a dispersed Strategic Air Command (SAC) Cold War wing formed to spread SAC's Boeing B-52 Stratofortress heavy bombers over a larger number of bases, thus making it more difficult for the Soviet Union to knock out the entire fleet with a surprise first strike. The wing was equipped with the B-52G. Starting in 1960, one third of the squadron's aircraft were maintained on fifteen-minute alert, fully fueled and ready for combat to reduce vulnerability to a Soviet missile strike. This was increased to half the squadron's aircraft in 1962. The squadron flew worldwide training missions with the KC-135s. During 1959 it participated in tests to determine the compatibility of the KC-135 with the refueling systems of the North American F-100 Super Sabre, McDonnell F-101 Voodoo, Lockheed F-104 Starfighter, Republic F-105 Thunderchief and Douglas B-66 Destroyer aircraft.

In early 1960, the 4241st wing deployed its operational squadrons during the reconstruction of the Seymour Johnson runway and main taxiway. During this time the 911th operated from Goose Air Base in Labrador, Canada. That summer, the squadron supported the deployment of Nineteenth Air Force from Seymour Johnson to Clark Air Base, Philippines in Exercise Mobile Yoke. In 1961 a crew from the squadron was named the top refueling crew in SAC during the annual combat competition.

The squadron transferred to the 68th Bombardment Wing in April 1963 when SAC replaced its Major Command controlled MAJCON strategic wings with wings carrying the honors of World War II organizations. The squadron periodically deployed to support the Eielson and Spanish Tanker Task Forces.

Beginning on 1 May 1972, the 911th deployed to Andersen Air Force Base, Guam and was attached to the Strategic Wing, Provisional, 72. Its mission was to support B-52 long-range air strikes over Southeast Asia with air refueling. It remained at Andersen supporting that mission until withdrawn in July 1973, returning to Seymour Johnson.

On 19 September 1985 the 911th was consolidated with the 411th Bombardment Squadron, giving the squadron a lineage and history dating to May 1917. The same year, the squadron traded in its KC-135As and received McDonnell Douglas KC-10 Extenders. Peacetime training missions continued until October 1989 when it supported tactical air operations as part of Operation Just Cause, the United States invasion of Panama. During the 1991 Gulf War, aircraft and crews from the squadron deployed to Lajes The Azores; Rota and Zaragoza and were attached to the 1709th Air Refueling Wing (Provisional). It operated from 31 December 1990 until March 1991 from its forward deployed base, then returned to Seymour Johnson.

=== Command changes ===
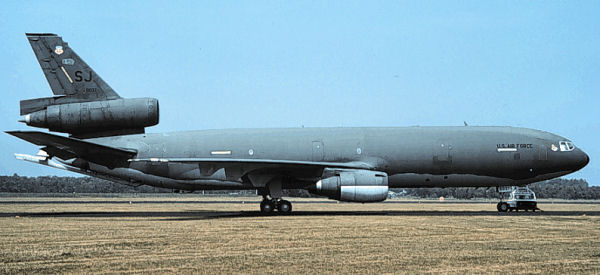
KC-10A Extender of the 68th Air Refueling Group. (Note: Aircraft is McDonnell Douglas KC-10A Extender, serial 85-033.)

On 22 April 1991, the squadron was transferred to the 4th Operations Group of Tactical Air Command (TAC) at Seymour Johnson, becoming part of the composite 4th Wing when the Air Force began to organize composite wings, which called for one wing on a base, was implemented there. With the inactivation of SAC and TAC in June 1992, Air Combat Command began to transfer its air refueling assets to Air Mobility Command and the 911th was reassigned to the 319th Operations Group at Grand Forks Air Force Base, North Dakota as the fourth tanker squadron of the 319th Air Refueling Wing, which became a "super tanker wing." The squadron's KC-10s were left behind and transferred to the newly activated 711th Air Refueling Squadron and the 911th converted to the KC-135R Stratotanker.

With the 319th, the squadron deployed KC-135Rs and crews to support tanker activities in Operation Deny Flight, the United Nations no-fly zone over Bosnia and Herzegovina; Operation Uphold Democracy, the United Nations action to remove the military junta and restore the elected president of Haiti; and Operation Constant Vigil from Howard Air Force Base in Panama. In 1996, the squadron was awarded the Spaatz Trophy for being the best air refueling squadron in Air Mobility Command during 1995. In 1997 members of the squadron deployed to Incirlik Air Base, Turkey to support Operation Northern Watch the Southwest Asia Task Force operation to monitor and control airspace in northern Iraq. From June through August 2000 the squadron moved its operations to MacDill Air Force Base, Florida while the runways at Grand Forks were being repaired.

After 11 September 2001 attacks, the 911th contributed personnel and aircraft to the 319th Air Expeditionary Group. It was deployed to a makeshift tent city somewhere in the arid desert of Southwest Asia. From the start of air operations over Afghanistan 7 October to 2 November 2001 the 319th had flown over 150 sorties and more than 1050 hours; pumping over 1.4 million US gallons (5,300 m3) of gas into more than 450 planes. The squadron remained in a partially deployed state, supporting Operation Enduring Freedom and Operation Iraqi Freedom throughout the 2000s. Implementing the recommendations of the 2005 Base Realignment and Closure Commission, the 911th was inactivated on 30 June 2007.

=== Associate unit ===
The 911th Air Refueling Squadron was reactivated on 12 April 2008 at Seymour Johnson Air Force Base as a geographically separated unit, the second KC-135 squadron of the 6th Air Mobility Wing at MacDill Air Force Base, Florida. With its return to its long-time base at Seymour Johnson, the squadron became an "Active Associate" unit, partnering with the Air Force Reserve Command's 77th Air Refueling Squadron of the 916th Air Refueling Wing. The 911th was the first tanker active associate unit to be formed and this reversed the roles of the units during the 1980s when the 916th wing (then a group) was an affiliate of the 911th. The 77th received an additional eight airplanes for it to operate with the 911th. The 77th shared its KC-135R/T aircraft with the 911th Air Refueling Squadron and personnel operating between the two squadrons. The squadron won its second Spaatz Trophy (Note: The Spaatz Trophy is awarded annually to the best performing air refueling squadron in the Air Force.) as an associate unit. In July 2020, the squadron was withdrawn from its associate status with the now-redesignated 6th Air Refueling Wing, transitioned to the KC-46A Pegasus, and was assigned to the 305th Operations Group at McGuire Air Force Base, New Jersey while remaining a geographically separated unit status at Seymour Johnson AFB, flying Air Force Reserve KC-46s assigned to the 916 ARW.

== Lineage ==
21st Observation Squadron

- Organized as 1st Company "B", 1st Regiment, Kelly Field in early May 1917

Redesignated 16th Aero Squadron c. 15 May 1917 (Note: LaHue, "AFHRA Factsheet" states this is the initial organization of the unit. The earlier organization was likely the source from which the squadron was manned, rather than a redesignation.)
Redesignated 21st Aero Squadron on 13 June 1917
Demobilized on 14 April 1919

- Reconstituted and redesignated 21st Observation Squadron on 24 March 1923

Activated in the reserve as associate to: 15th Observation Squadron
Disbanded on 1 October 1933

- Consolidated with the 21st Reconnaissance Squadron on 2 December 1936

411th Bombardment Squadron

- Constituted as the 21st Observation Squadron (Long Range Amphibian) on 1 March 1935

Redesignated as 21st Reconnaissance Squadron on 1 September 1936

- Consolidated with the 21st Observation Squadron on 2 December 1936

Redesignated 21st Reconnaissance Squadron (Long Range) on 6 December 1939
Redesignated 21st Reconnaissance Squadron (Heavy) on 20 November 1940
Redesignated 411th Bombardment Squadron (Heavy) on 22 April 1942
Redesignated 411th Bombardment Squadron, Very Heavy on 28 March 1944
Inactivated on 1 April 1944

- Activated on 1 April 1944

Inactivated on 10 May 1944

- Activated on 1 June 1944

Inactivated on 15 April 1946

- Consolidated with the 911th Air Refueling Squadron as the 911th Air Refueling Squadron on 19 September 1985

911th Air Refueling Squadron

- Constituted as the 911th Air Refueling Squadron, Heavy on 28 May 1958

Activated on 1 December 1958

- Consolidated with the 411th Bombardment Squadron on 19 September 1985

Redesignated 911th Air Refueling Squadron on 1 July 1992
Inactivated on 30 June 2007

- Activated on 12 April 2008

=== Assignments ===
- Post Headquarters, Kelly Field, March 1917
- Post Headquarters, Scott Field, 11 August 1917
- Aviation Concentration Center, 23 December 1917
- Air Service Replacement Concentration Center, 23 January 1918
- 3d Air Instructional Center, 21 February 1918
- 1st Air Depot, January 1919
- Commanding General, Services of Supply, January–March 1919
- Eastern Department, 5–14 April 1919
- 9th Observation Group, 24 March 1923
- 8th Division, 15 August 1927
- VIII Corps Area, 15 February 1929 – 1 October 1933
- 2d Wing (later 2d Bombardment Wing), 1 March 1935 (attached to 2d Bombardment Group after 1 September 1936, further attached to the 7th Naval District for operations, September 1939 – August 1940)
- 3d Bombardment Wing, 15 November 1940 (attached to Newfoundland Base Command for operations, May – August 1941)
- 29th Bombardment Group, attached 5 September 1941, assigned 25 February 1942 – 1 April 1944
- 29th Bombardment Group, 1 April 1944 – 10 May 1944
- 502d Bombardment Group, 1 June 1944 – 15 April 1946 (attached to 6th Bombardment Group), September 1944 – January 1945
- 4241st Strategic Wing, 1 December 1958
- 68th Bombardment Wing, 15 April 1963
- 68th Air Refueling Group (later, 68 Air Refueling Wing), 30 September 1982
- 4th Operations Group, 22 April 1991
- 319th Operations Group, 29 April 1994 – 30 June 2007
- 6th Operations Group, 12 April 2008
- 916th Operations Group, 1 November 2016
- 305th Operations Group, 31 July 2020 – present

=== Stations ===
- Kelly Field, Texas, May 1917
- Scott Field, Illinois, 11 August 1917
- Aviation Concentration Center, Garden City, New York, 23 December 1917 – c. 4 January 1918
- St. Maixent Replacement Barracks, France, 23 January 1918
- Issoudun Aerodrome, France, 21 February 1918
- Bordeaux, France, c. January 1918 – c. 18 March 1919
- Hazelhurst Field, New York, c. 5–14 April 1919
- Bolling Field, District of Columbia, 1 March 1935
- Langley Field, Virginia, 1 September 1936
- 36th Street Airport, Miami, Florida, 9 September 1939 – 22 April 1941
- Newfoundland Airport, Dominion of Newfoundland, 1 May 1941 – 30 August 1941
- MacDill Field, Florida, c. 3 September 1941
- Gowen Field, Idaho, 25 June 1942 – 1 April 1944
- Pratt Army Air Field, Kansas, 1 April 1944 – 10 May 1944
- Davis-Monthan Field, Arizona, 1 June 1944
- Dalhart Army Air Field, Texas, 5 June 1944
- Grand Island Army Air Field, Nebraska, 26 September 1944 – 7 April 1945
- Northwest Field, Guam, 12 May 1945 – 15 April 1946
- Seymour Johnson Air Force Base, North Carolina, 1 December 1958
- Grand Forks Air Force Base, North Dakota, 29 April 1994 – 30 June 2007
- Seymour Johnson Air Force Base, North Carolina, 12 April 2008 – present

=== Aircraft ===
- Nieuport 27 (1918)
- Nieuport 80 (1918)
- Avro 504K (1918)
- Douglas O-38 (1935–1936)
- Douglas OA-4 Dolphin (1936–1937)
- Douglas YOA-5 (1936–1937)
- Martin B-10 (1936–1937)
- Douglas B-18 Bolo (1937–1941)
- Northrop A-17 Nomad (1939–1941)
- Boeing B-17 Flying Fortress (1939–1943)
- Sikorsky Y1OA-8 (1939–1941)
- Grumman OA-9 Goose (1939–1941)
- Consolidated OA-10 Catalina (1939–1941)
- Lockheed A-29 Hudson (1941–1942)
- Consolidated B-24 Liberator (1943–1944)
- Boeing B-29 Superfortress (1944–1946)
- Boeing KC-135 Stratotanker (1958–1985, 1994–2007, 2008 – 2020)
- McDonnell Douglas KC-10 Extender (1985–1994)
- Boeing KC-46 Pegasus (2020–present)

=== Awards and campaigns ===
Award streamer	Award	Dates	Notes
	Distinguished Unit Citation	6 July 1945 – 13 July 1945 Japan	411th Bombardment Squadron
	Air Force Outstanding Unit Award	1 July 1965 – 30 June 1966	911th Air Refueling Squadron
	Air Force Outstanding Unit Award	1 July 1985 – 30 June 1987	911th Air Refueling Squadron
	Air Force Outstanding Unit Award	26 April 1989 – 1 April 1991	911th Air Refueling Squadron
	Air Force Outstanding Unit Award	23 April 1991 – 31 May 1993	911th Air Refueling Squadron
	Air Force Outstanding Unit Award	1 October 1993 – 30 June 1995	911th Air Refueling Squadron
	Air Force Outstanding Unit Award	1 June 1994 – 31 October 1994	911th Air Refueling Squadron
	Air Force Outstanding Unit Award	1 July 1995 – 30 June 1997	911th Air Refueling Squadron
	Air Force Outstanding Unit Award	1 July 2000 – 30 June 2002	911th Air Refueling Squadron
	Air Force Outstanding Unit Award	1 July 2002 – 30 June 2004	911th Air Refueling Squadron
	Air Force Outstanding Unit Award	1 July 2004 – 30 June 2005	911th Air Refueling Squadron
	Air Force Outstanding Unit Award	1 July 2005 – 30 June 2006	911th Air Refueling Squadron
	Air Force Outstanding Unit Award	1 July 2006 – 30 June 2007	911th Air Refueling Squadron
	Air Force Outstanding Unit Award	12 April 2008 – 30 June 2009	911th Air Refueling Squadron
	Air Force Outstanding Unit Award	1 July 2009 – 31 July 2009	911th Air Refueling Squadron
	Air Force Outstanding Unit Award	1 August 2009 – 30 June 2010	911th Air Refueling Squadron
	Air Force Outstanding Unit Award	1 July 2013 – 30 June 2014	911th Air Refueling Squadron
	Air Force Outstanding Unit Award	1 January 2016 – 31 July 2017	911th Air Refueling Squadron
	Air Force Outstanding Unit Award	1 January 2017 – 31 December 2017	911th Air Refueling Squadron

Campaign Streamer	Campaign	Dates	Notes
	Theater of Operations	23 January 1918 – 1919	21st Aero Squadron
	Antisubmarine	January 1942-25 June 1942	21st Reconnaissance Squadron (later 411th Bombardment Squadron)
	American Theater without inscription	7 December 1941 – 7 April 1945	21st Reconnaissance Squadron (later 411th Bombardment Squadron)
	Air Offensive, Japan	12 May 1945 – 2 September 1945	411th Bombardment Squadron
	Eastern Mandates	30 June 1945 – 1945	411th Bombardment Squadron
	Western Pacific	12 May 1945 – 2 September 1945	411th Bombardment Squadron
	Defense of Saudi Arabia	2 August 1990 – 16 January 1991	911th Air Refueling Squadron (Note: The campaign terminated in April 1944, but credit given for actual combat in the area on later dates.)
	Liberation and Defense of Kuwait	17 January 1991 – 11 April 1991	911th Air Refueling Squadron

== See also ==
- List of American Aero Squadrons
- List of MAJCOM wings of the United States Air Force
- List of United States Air Force air refueling squadrons
- B-17 Flying Fortress units of the United States Army Air Forces
- B-24 Liberator units of the United States Army Air Forces
- List of B-29 Superfortress operators
