= 4th Fighter Wing =

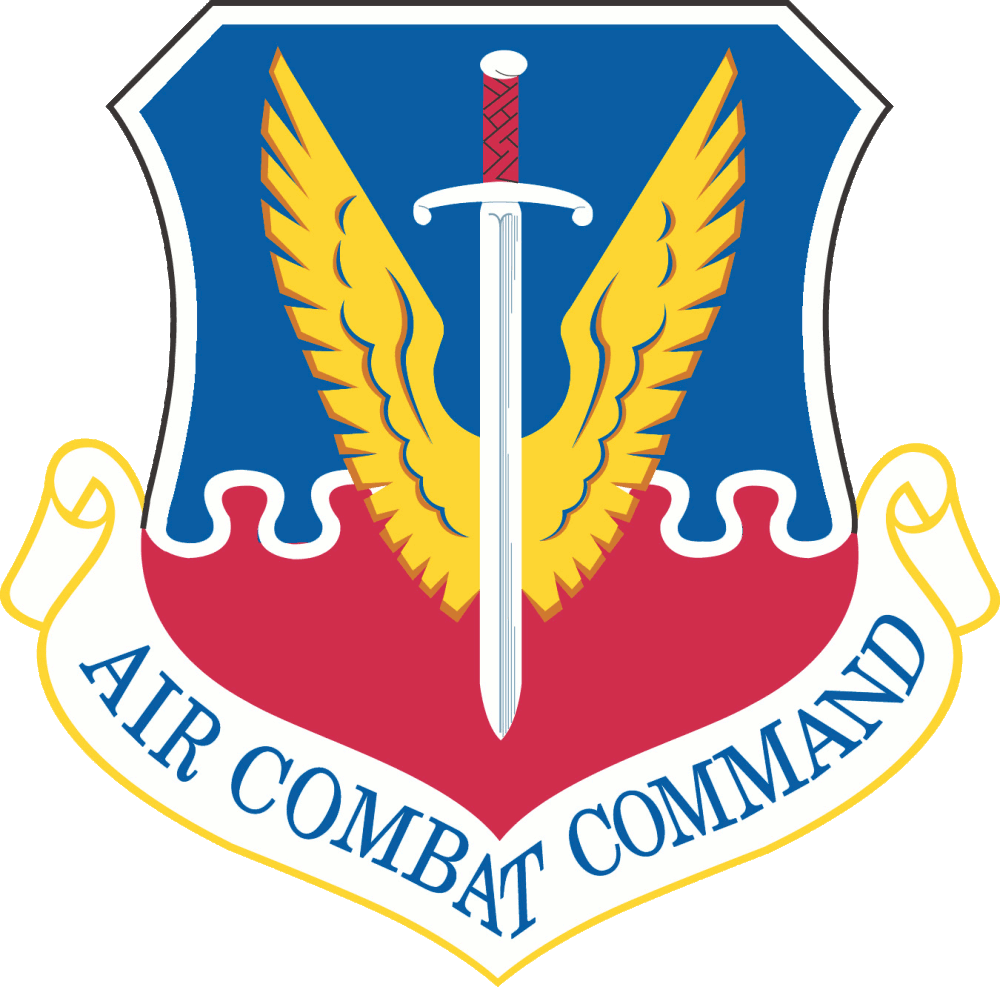
4th Fighter Wing

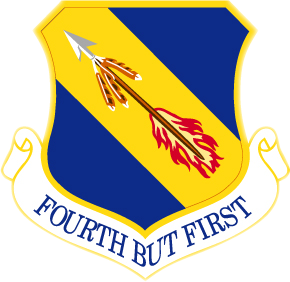
- 4th Fighter Wing emblem
- Active: 1947–1958; 1948–present
- Country: United States
- Branch: United States Air Force
- Type: Wing
- Role: Fighter
- Part of: Air Combat Command
- Garrison/HQ: Seymour Johnson AFB, North Carolina
- Motto: Fourth But First
- Engagements: Korean War; 1991 Gulf War

- Decorations: Air Force Outstanding Unit Award (12x); Republic of Korea Presidential Unit Citation (2x)

Commanders
- Current commander: Col. Brian Novchich
- Command Chief: CMSgt Craig L. French
- Notable commanders: Walker M. Mahurin; John C. Meyer; Chuck Yeager; Robert C. Richardson III; John E. Ralph; Hal M. Hornburg; Lance L. Smith; Norman R. Seip; Steven L. Kwast; Jeannie Leavitt; Lawrence E. Huggins; William E. Bryan Jr.

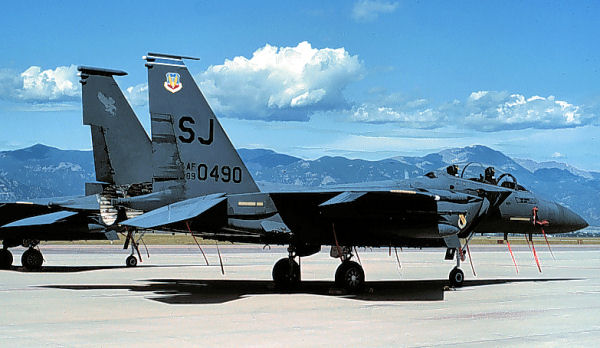
McDonnell Douglas F-15E-48-MC Strike Eagle, AF Serial No. 89-0490 of the 334th Fighter Squadron.

The 4th Fighter Wing is a United States Air Force unit assigned to the Air Combat Command's Fifteenth Air Force. It is stationed at Seymour Johnson Air Force Base, North Carolina, where it is also the host unit.

The wing is one of two Air Force units that can trace its history to another country. The wing's 4th Operations Group had its origins as the Royal Air Force Eagle Squadrons (Nos. 71, 121 and 133 Squadrons). When the United States entered World War II, these units, and the American pilots in them, were transferred to the United States Army Air Forces VIII Fighter Command, forming the 4th Fighter Group on 12 September 1942.

The current commander of the 4th Fighter Wing is Colonel Brian “Stitch” Novchich.

== Units ==
The wing consists of four active duty groups—4th Maintenance Group, 4th Mission Support Group, 4th Operations Group and 4th Medical Group—and is assigned over 6,400 military members, about 600 civilians and 95 F-15E Strike Eagles. An additional organization, the 414th Fighter Group (414 FG) of the Air Force Reserve Command, is an Air Force Reserve "associate" unit to the 4th Fighter Wing, with its flight crews and maintenance crews flying, maintaining and supporting the same F-15E aircraft as their active duty counterparts.

- 4th Operations Group
  (Tail Code: SJ). The 4th Operations Group is the largest organization in the 4th Fighter Wing. The group consists of two operational fighter squadrons, the 335th and 336th; two fighter training squadrons, the 333rd and 334th; and two support squadrons, which include the 4th Training Squadron (Strike Eagle Academics) and the 4th Operations Support Squadron. The group provides worldwide command and control for two operational F-15E squadrons and is responsible for conducting the Air Force's only F-15E training operation, qualifying crews to serve in worldwide combat-ready positions.
- 4th Maintenance Group
  The 4th Maintenance Group consists of four squadrons and more than 2,300 military and civilian personnel. The group is responsible for the maintenance support used to maintain, mobilize and deploy 96 F-15E Strike Eagle aircraft for worldwide expeditionary aerospace operations. The group also oversees all on- and off-aircraft equipment maintenance, while providing standardized weapons loading and academics training to support the execution of the wing's flying hour program consisting of more than 16,000 sorties and 25,000 hours
- 4th Mission Support Group
  The 4th Mission Support Group is responsible for the leadership and management of civil engineering, communications-computer systems support, security and law enforcement, personnel, information management, education, food services, housing, and recreation for a community of more than 13,000 people. The group is also responsible for maintaining the capability to deploy readiness teams worldwide to build, secure and operate bases to support combat forces
- 4th Medical Group
- 414th Fighter Group
  (Tail Code: SJ). The group consists of approximately 340 personnel comprising both part-time Traditional Reservists (TR) and full-time Air Reserve Technicians (ART) and Active Guard and Reserve (AGR). Collectively, they make up an operational fighter squadron, the 307th Fighter Squadron (307 FS) and the 414th Maintenance Squadron (414 MXS). The 307 FS reports operationally to the 4th Operations Group and the 414 MXS to the 4th Maintenance Group.

== History ==
=== Korean War ===
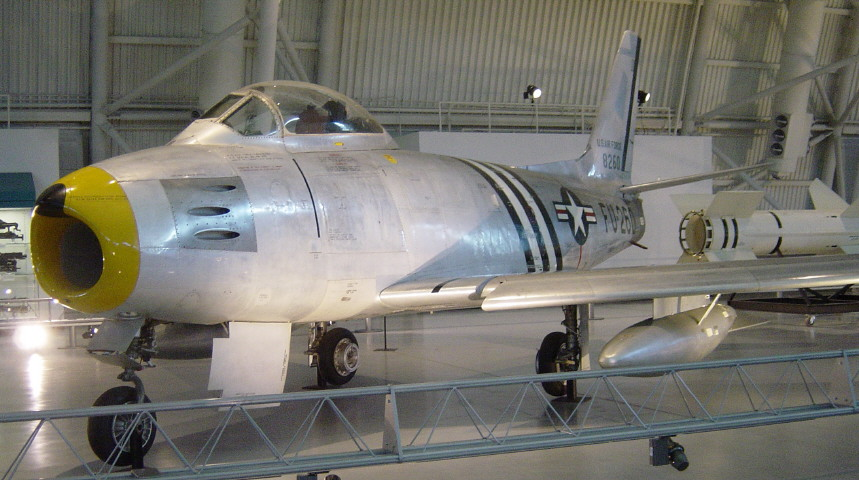
Sabre at NASM in the livery of 4th Fighter-Interceptor Wing

As the 4th Fighter-Interceptor Wing it flew the North American F-86 Sabre during the Korean War and was the top MiG-killing organization during the conflict. On 17 December 1950, Lt. Col. Bruce H. Hinton shot down a MiG-15 during the very first Sabre mission of the war.

4 Wing moved to Japan following the Korean armistice in 1953 and remained there until 8 December 1957.

The wing joined Ninth Air Force on 1 January 1962. At about the time of the Cuban Missile Crisis it was attached to 2 Air Division [Provisional] from 21 Oct-c. 29 Nov 1962.

=== Vietnam War ===
The 4th transitioned to the McDonnell Douglas F-4 Phantom II in early 1967. The readiness posture of the wing was tested in early 1968 when North Korea seized the USS Pueblo, an American intelligence-gathering ship, off the coast of North Korea. Elements of the 4th moved to Korea within 72 hours. The 4th Fighter Wing continued to sustain a highly visible mobility posture with the development of the first operationally ready bare-base squadron in 1970, followed by multiple deployments to Southeast Asia beginning in April 1972. Operating from Ubon Royal Thai Air Force Base, Thailand, as the first F-4 wing to augment elements of Pacific Air Forces, aircrews of the Fourth flew more than 8,000 combat missions, many into the capital of North Vietnam. The wing ended deployments to Thailand in the summer of 1974.

=== Post-Vietnam operations ===
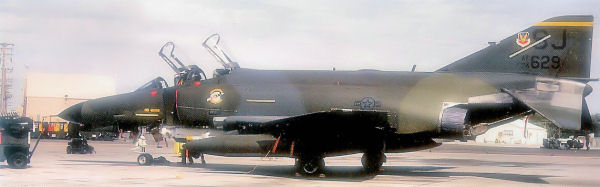
F-4E-61-MC Phantom 74-1629 of the 336th Tactical Fighter Squadron, 1984.

In October 1973, the 4th TFW transferred some of its F-4 Phantoms directly to Israel in the Operation Nickel Grass

In 1974, the wing mission reverted to training, with increased emphasis on short-term European contingency support. Elements of the wing deployed to Norway in June 1974. Three short-term deployments to Spangdahlem AB, West Germany, were conducted in March 1974, July and September 1975. The highlight of 1976 came in November when the wing took first place in the William Tell worldwide weapons competition at Tyndall AFB, Florida, becoming the first F-4 unit to win the Aerospace Defense Command-sponsored event. The wing executed short-term deployments to South Korea and Japan during 1977 and assumed a dual-based mission with Ramstein AB in October of that year. In 1980 the 4th TFW became one of the first squadrons in the Rapid Deployment Force, which committed 2 squadrons of aircraft to a 48-hour response to anywhere in the world. The 337th Fighter Squadron was activated 1 April 1982 and inactivated 1 July 1985. The overall mission commitment was restructured to reflect worldwide contingency emphasis in October 1986.

In 1988 the 4th TFW began transitioning to the F-15E Strike Eagle. The first F-15E arrived on 29 December 1988, and the 336th Tactical Fighter Squadron became the first operational F-15E squadron in the Air Force on 1 October 1989. The transition from the F-4E to the F-15E was completed on 1 July 1991, making the 4th TFW the first operational F-15E wing in the Air Force.

=== Desert Storm ===
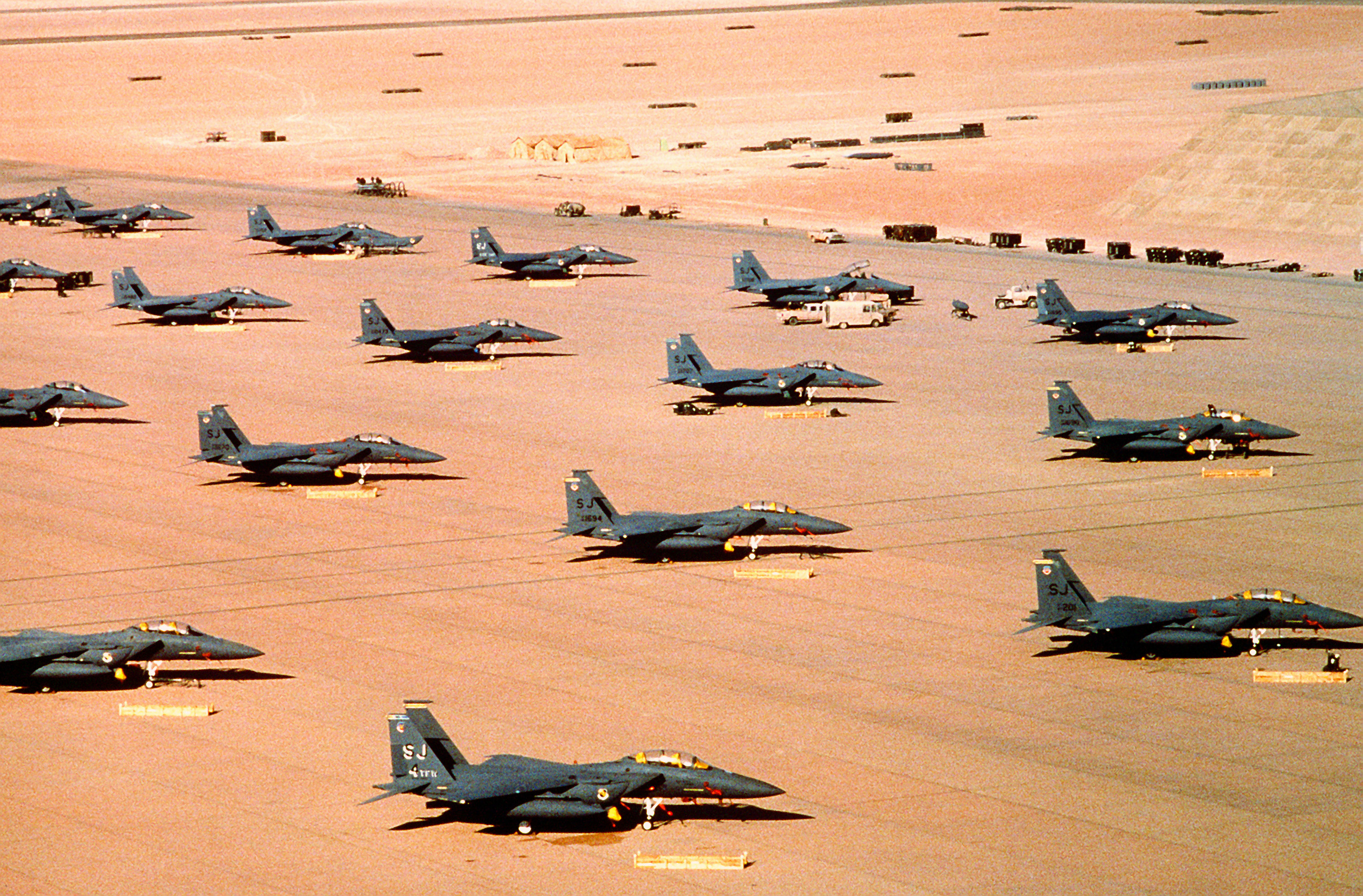
4th FW F-15Es in Southwest Asia in 1992.

At the height of conversion training, the 4th TFW was one of the first units tasked to react to Iraq's invasion of Kuwait. The 335th and 336th Tactical Fighter Squadrons and support personnel deployed to Saudi Arabia, beginning in August 1990. The combat record of the 4th TFW in Saudi Arabia was exceptional, with the 336th TFS flying 1,088 combat missions during Operation Desert Storm. The unit dropped more than six-million pounds of bombs on Scud missile sites, bridges and airfields. Most of the missions were flown at night.

The 335th TFS flew more than 1,200 combat missions during the war. Most significantly, they made Air Force history by using a laser-guided bomb to down an enemy helicopter. The 335th destroyed 45 Iraqi aircraft, 23 radio relay stations, 36 bridges, 478 armored vehicles and 48 Scud missiles. The 4th lost two aircraft during the war. Two air crewmen were killed in action and two were captured and released after the war.

After the cease-fire, the 4th TFW continued rotating squadron elements to Southwest Asia during the 1990s, taking part in the enforcement of the no-fly zones in Iraq. The Fourth deployed 15 times to Dhahran Airbase and twice to Prince Sultan Airbase Saudi Arabia in support of the newly designated Operation Southern Watch (OSW). They conducted the first ever F-15E operations from Al Jaber Airbase, Kuwait, again supporting OSW. In June 1996 and February 1997, the 4 FW deployed as the 4 Air Expeditionary Wing to Doha, Qatar, in AEF III and IV respectively. With minimum notice, the Fourth proved their ability to rapidly deploy and conduct combat operations from a near bare base location immediately upon arrival.

=== From the 1990s ===
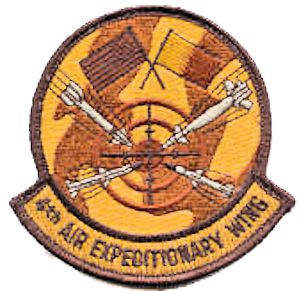
4th AEW emblem

On 22 April 1991, the 4th Tactical Fighter Wing was redesignated as the 4th Wing, the Air Force's first composite wing. The 4th Wing incorporated under it all the people, KC-10 aircraft, and assets of the 68th Air Refueling Wing, a former Strategic Air Command unit. The KC-10s were reassigned to Air Mobility Command bases in 1994 and 1995 and the F-15E formal training unit moved to Seymour Johnson in 1994 and 1995. With the transfer of the KC-10s, aircrews, and support personnel to Air Mobility Command in 1994 and 1995, the 4th lost its status as a composite wing and was redesignated the 4th Fighter Wing 1 December 1995.

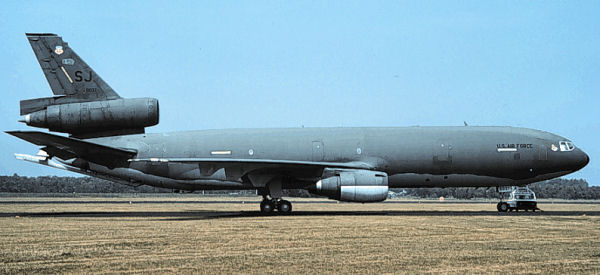
McDonnell Douglas KC-10A Extender AF Serial No. 85-0033 of the 68th Air Refueling Group. This aircraft is now with the 305th Air Mobility Wing, McGuire Air Force Base, New Jersey

On 1 October 1994, the 333d Fighter Squadron was transferred back to the 4th Operations Group, after a 29-year absence, from the 355th Fighter Wing at Davis–Monthan AFB, Arizona to accommodate the training mission. The 333d was transferred to the 355th TFW while at Takhli RTAFB during the Vietnam War. The 334th FS began transitioning from an operational squadron to an F-15E training squadron in 1995, giving the 4th two F-15E training squadrons.

During the Balkans crisis and 1999 NATO bombing of Yugoslavia, the 4th Air Expeditionary Wing deployed over 700 personnel to Körfez Airport, Balikisir, Turkey in May, and completed a 2200-man tent city with an Air Transportable Hospital in six days. Three days later, the Fourth was ready to receive F-15Es and F-16CJs to fly Operation Allied Force bombing missions over Serbia. Although the aircraft were not needed for "Allied Force," they were used to relieve overextended units from RAF Lakenheath. In April 1999, the 336th FS deployed 4 F-15E's and support personnel to Incirlik AB, Turkey to participate in Operation Northern Watch. The 335th FS replaced the 336th Fighter Squadron aircraft with 10 F-15E's and both squadrons combined, completed the longest continuous deployment by the 4th FW since Desert Shield/Desert Storm in December 1990. Also in August 1999, eight F-15E Strike Eagles and 107 personnel from the 336th participated in COMBAT ARCHER,. The 336th flew 99 sorties and expended seven air-to-air missiles.

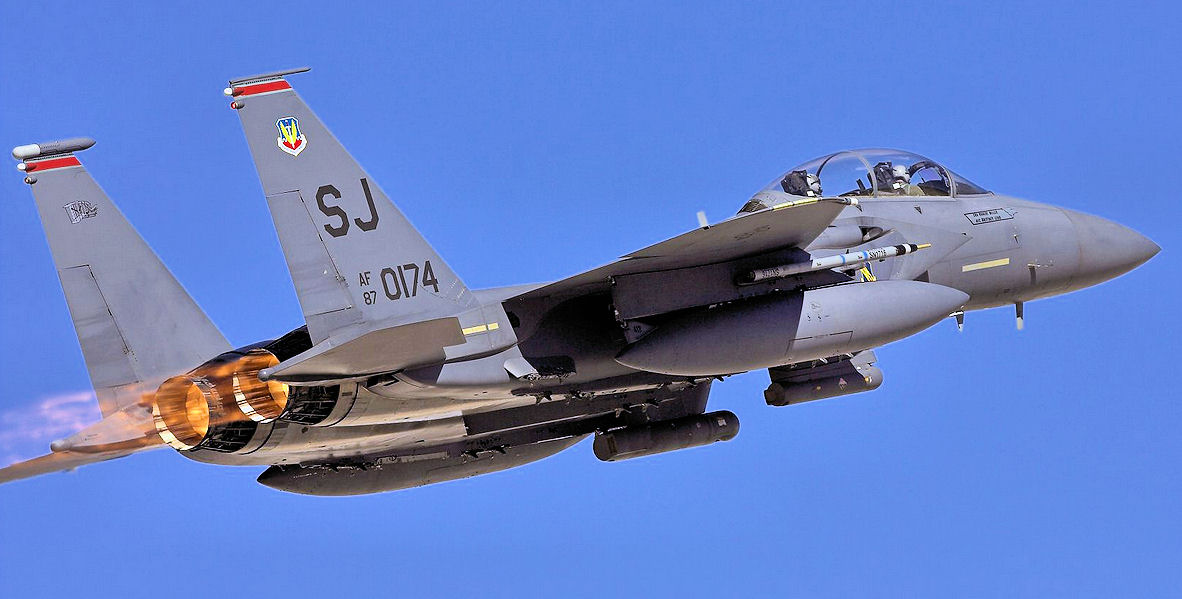
F-15E 87-0174 333rd Fighter Squadron

Calendar Year 2000 began with the 335th and 336th deployment of 22 F-15Es and over 350 personnel in support of exercise RED FLAG, 5 to 19 February. Both squadrons performed Offensive Counter Air and Interdiction roles in a day/night high-threat scenario. Additionally, the 4th covered the core unit responsibilities for seventy additional personnel from various base support agencies during RED FLAG, including the Deployed Force Commander and Deputy Deployed Force Commander.

The 4th exercised as a 4th Aerospace Expeditionary Wing during a Phase II exercise for the first time in nearly two years. The purpose of the exercise was for aircrew and support people to practice their war-fighting skills from a simulated deployed location. The focus of the exercise was to practice aircraft launches and evaluate the wings "Ability To Survive and Operate" procedures in austere situations. Specific ability to survive and operate procedures included, identification and marking of unexploded ordnance, protection of forces and proper wear of chemical protective clothing.

In May 2000, aircraft and members of the 336th (Rocketeers) joined other Operation Northern Watch forces in actively patrolling the Iraqi northern no-fly zone. The Rocketeers flew more than 60 combat sorties and dropped more than 69,000 pounds of ordnance.

The 4th supported Exercise Roving Sands 2000 June 19 to 23, 2000, at Nellis AFB, Nevada. Eight aircraft, 25 aircrew, and 147 personnel comprised the 336th team. The Joint Theater Air and Missile Defense exercise consisted of both simulated and live operations conducted at multiple locations.

In January 2001, the 4th Fighter Wing became the recipient of the Commander-In-Chief's Installation Excellence Award—receiving a one million dollar prize for quality of life and job enhancement.

=== Twenty-first century ===
On 1 September 2002, the Fourth transitioned into its final on-call air expeditionary wing. Though the 4th Fighter Wing will continue as a lead wing when deployed, it was thereafter to assimilate into a more predictable 90-day 10 AEF schedule, as opposed to waiting for the call from higher headquarters.

On 18 July 2009 an F-15 from the wing based at Bagram Air Base crashed during a combat mission. The aircraft's crew, pilot Captain Mark R. McDowell and Weapon Systems Officer Captain Thomas J. Gramith, were killed. An investigation concluded that the crash was a result of crew error.

The 4th Fighter Wing was involved in the 2026 Iran War, three F-15Es were shot down due to friendly fire.

== Lineage ==
- Established as the 4th Fighter Wing on 28 July 1947

Organized on 15 August 1947
Redesignated 4th Fighter-Interceptor Wing on 20 January 1950
Redesignated 4th Fighter-Bomber Wing on 8 March 1955
Redesignated 4th Fighter-Day Wing on 25 April 1956
Redesignated 4th Tactical Fighter Wing on 1 July 1958
Redesignated 4th Wing on 22 April 1991
Redesignated 4th Fighter Wing on 1 December 1995

=== Assignments ===
- Strategic Air Command, 15 August 1947
- Fourteenth Air Force, 1 December 1948 (attached to First Air Force, 15 January – 22 February 1949)
- Ninth Air Force, 23 February 1949 (attached to Eastern Air Defense Force 10 November 1949, further attached to 26th Air Division 20 February 1950)
- First Air Force, 1 August 1950 (remained attached to Eastern Air Defense Force and 26th Air Division)
- Eastern Air Defense Force, 1 September 1950 (remained attached to 26th Air Division – c. 19 November 1950, attached to Fifth Air Force 28 November 1950 – 7 March 1955, further attached to 314th Air Division 22 December 1950 – 7 May 1951, to 39th Air Division after 1 March 1955)
- 39th Air Division, 8 March 1955
- Ninth Air Force, 8 December 1957
- Twelfth Air Force, 1 July 1960
- Ninth Air Force, 1 January 1962 (attached to 2 Air Division [Provisional], 21 October – c. 29 November 1962)
- 833d Air Division, 1 October 1964 (attached to Fifth Air Force ADVON, 29 January – c. 29 July 1968)
- Ninth Air Force, 24 December 1969 – 20 August 2020.
- 15th Air Force was reactivated on 20 August 2020 – present. (Reactivation of the 15th AF consolidates the units of the Ninth Air Force and Twelfth Air Force.)

=== Components ===
Wings

- 354th Tactical Fighter Wing: attached 5–24 July 1968

Groups

- 4th Fighter Group (later 4th Fighter-Interceptor Group, 4th Fighter-Bomber Group 4th Fighter-Day Group 4th Operations Group): 15 August 1947 – 8 December 1957; 22 April 1991 – present
- 23d Fighter Group: 27 June 2000 – 18 August 2006
- 363d Tactical Reconnaissance Group: attached 26 April 1949 – c. 1 August 1950

Squadrons

- 7th Fighter-Bomber Squadron: attached 21 March – 1 October 1957
- 333d Fighter-Day Squadron (later 333d Tactical Fighter Squadron, 333d Fighter Squadron): 8 December 1957 – 4 December 1965; 1 October 1994 – present (detached 10 March 1964 – c. 15 March 1965)
- 334th Fighter-Day Squadron (later 334th Tactical Fighter Squadron, 334th Fighter Squadron): 8 December 1957 – present (detached 1 April – 13 August 1963, 15 February – 29 May 1965, 28 August 1965 – 5 February 1966, 13 December 1969 – c. 31 May 1970, 11 April – 5 August 1972, 30 September 1972 – 18 March 1973, 29 August – 29 September 1980, 26 August – 29 September 1981, 22 May – 20 June 1984)
- 335th Fighter-Day Squadron (later 335th Tactical Fighter Squadron, 335th Fighter Squadron): 8 December 1957 – present (detached 1 May 1960 – 22 November 1961, 16 November 1964 – 21 February 1965, 3 July – 15 December 1965, 4 December 1969 – c. 25 May 1970, 6 July – 22 December 1972, 2 September – 2 October 1978, 28 August – 29 September 1979, 27 December 1990 – 22 April 1991)
- 336th Fighter-Day Squadron (later 336th Tactical Fighter Squadron, 336th Fighter Squadron): 8 December 1957 – present (detached 12 August 1963 – 7 January 1964, 25 May – 30 August 1965, 12 April – 30 September 1972, 9 March – 7 September 1973, 25 March – 17 April 1977, 11 September – 13 October 1978, 31 August – 1 October 1979, 26 August – 26 September 1980, 5 September – 3 October 1983, 26 August – 26 September 1985, 9 August 1990 – 13 March 1991)
- 337th Tactical Fighter Squadron: 1 April 1982 – 1 July 1985
- 339th Fighter-Interceptor Squadron: attached 18 November 1954 – 15 September 1957
- 344th Air Refueling Squadron: 22 April 1991 – 29 April 1994
- 476th Tactical Fighter Squadron: 25 September 1968 – 18 March 1969
- 558th Tactical Fighter Squadron: attached 4 February – 10 March 1968 and 26 March – 22 July 1968
- 711th Air Refueling Squadron: 29 April – 1 October 1994
- 744th Air Refueling Squadron: 29 April 1994 – 1 December 1995
- 911th Air Refueling Squadron: 22 April 1991 – 29 April 1994

=== Bases assigned ===
- Andrews Air Force Base, Maryland, 15 August 1947
- Langley Air Force Base, Virginia, 26 April 1949
- New Castle County Airport, Delaware, 8 September – 19 November 1950
- Johnson Air Base, Japan, 28 November 1950
- Suwon Air Base (K-13), South Korea, 7 May 1951
- Kimpo Air Base (K-14), South Korea, 23 August 1951
- Chitose Air Base, Japan, 1 October 1954 – 8 December 1957
- Seymour Johnson Air Force Base, North Carolina, 8 December 1957–present

Operated from:

McCoy Air Force Base, Florida, 21 October – c. 29 November 1962 (Cuban Missile Crisis)
Kunsan Air Base, South Korea, 29 January – 29 July 1968 (Pueblo Crisis)
Components of wing deployed to Prince Sultan Air Base, Saudi Arabia as the 4th Tactical Fighter Wing (Provisional), December 1990 – June 1991 (Operation Desert Shield/Storm)

== Medal of Honor recipients ==
- George Andrew Davis Jr., Korean War ace
