= 711th Air Refueling Squadron =

United States Airforce aerial refueling unit

The United States Air Force's 711th Air Refueling Squadron (711 ARS) was an aerial refueling unit activated in 1994. The unit was previously known as the 911th Air Refueling Squadron and was formed to operate and facilitate the transfer of the ten KC-10 Extender tankers from Seymour Johnson Air Force Base, North Carolina, to either Travis Air Force Base in California or McGuire Air Force Base in New Jersey.

The first KC-10 was prepared for transfer to Travis AFB in August 1994. That month, an air crew from the 711th received the Lt. Gen. William H. Tunner Award from the Air Force Association in recognition for a medical evacuation it performed in Mogadishu on January 28, 1993, during Operation Restore Hope. The entire 711th squadron was disbanded after the departure of the KC-10s from Seymour Johnson AFB.
