= 916th Air Refueling Wing =

US Air Force unit

916th Air Refueling Wing

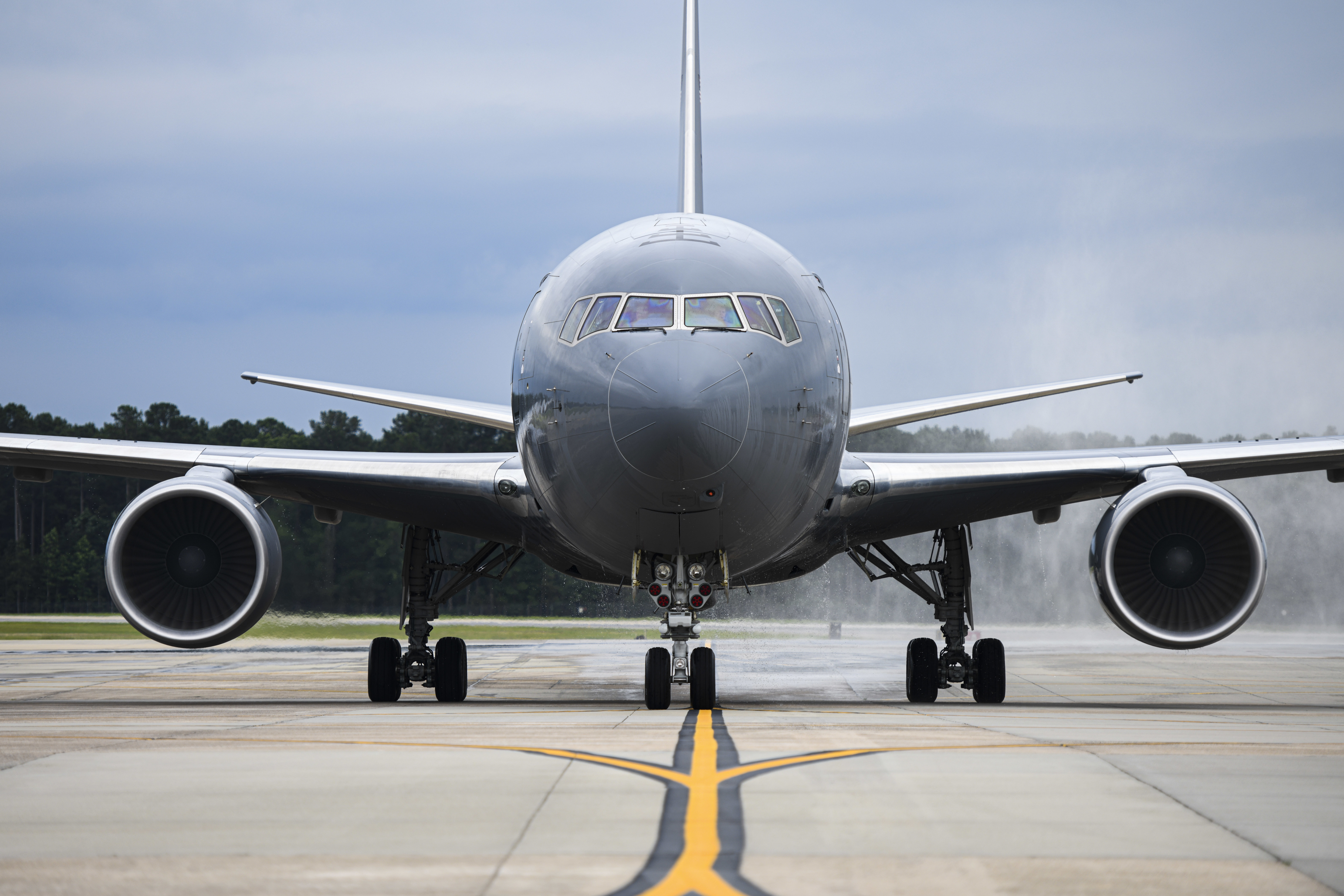
- The first KC-46A Pegasus lands at Seymour Johnson Air Force Base, North Carolina, June 12, 2020
- Active: 1963–1972; 1986 – present
- Country: United States
- Branch: United States Air Force
- Type: Wing
- Role: Aerial refueling
- Part of: Air Force Reserve Command
- Garrison/HQ: Seymour Johnson Air Force Base, North Carolina
- Motto: Maximo Conato (Latin for 'By the Utmost Effort') (1963–1972)
- Decorations: Air Force Outstanding Unit Award; Republic of Vietnam Gallantry Cross with Palm

Commanders
- Current commander: Colonel Diane E. Patton

Insignia
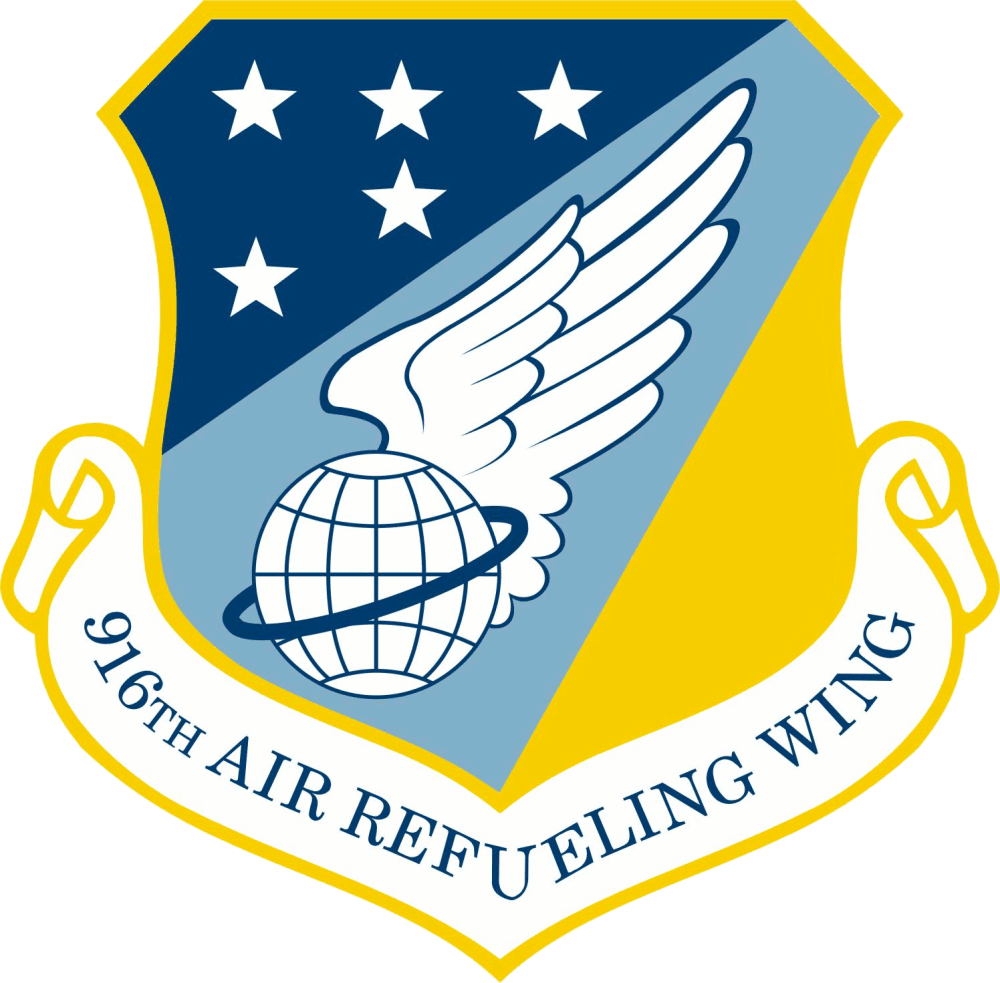
- 916th Air Refueling Wing emblem (Note: Approved 4 May 1964.)
- Tail stripe: Green, "First in Flight" in yellow

Aircraft flown
- Tanker: Boeing KC-46 Pegasus

The 916th Air Refueling Wing is an Air Reserve Component of the United States Air Force. It is assigned to the Fourth Air Force, Air Force Reserve Command, stationed at Seymour Johnson Air Force Base, North Carolina. If mobilized, the wing is gained by the Air Mobility Command.

The wing was scheduled to start flying the KC-46A Pegasus in 2019. The first KC-46A was delivered on June 12, 2020, the second on August 7, 2020, and the third and fourth on September 10, 2020.

== Mission ==
Fly the KC-46A Pegasus in air-to-air refueling and other air mobility missions.

== Units ==
- 916th Operations Group

77th Air Refueling Squadron
911th Air Refueling Squadron – Active Associate unit to the 916 ARW, reporting to the 305th Operations Group at McGuire Air Force Base

- 916th Maintenance Group
- 916th Mission Support Group
- 916th Aerospace Medical Squadron

== History ==
=== Need for reserve troop carrier groups ===
During the first half of 1955, the Air Force began detaching Air Force Reserve squadrons from their parent wing locations to separate sites. The concept offered several advantages. Communities were more likely to accept the smaller squadrons than the large wings and the location of separate squadrons in smaller population centers would facilitate recruiting and manning. Continental Air Command (ConAC)'s plan called for placing Air Force Reserve units at fifty-nine installations located throughout the United States. When these relocations were completed in 1959, reserve wing headquarters and wing support elements would typically be on one base, along with one (or in some cases two) of the wing's flying squadrons, while the remaining flying squadrons were spread over thirty-five Air Force, Navy and civilian airfields under what was called the Detached Squadron Concept.

Although this dispersal was not a problem when the entire wing was called to active service, mobilizing a single flying squadron and elements to support it proved difficult. This weakness was demonstrated in the partial mobilization of reserve units during the Berlin Crisis of 1961 To resolve this, at the start of 1962, ConAC determined to reorganize its reserve wings by establishing groups with support elements for each of its troop carrier squadrons. This reorganization would facilitate mobilization of elements of wings in various combinations when needed. However, as this plan was entering its implementation phase, another partial mobilization occurred for the Cuban Missile Crisis, with the units being released on 22 November 1962. The formation of troop carrier groups occurred in January 1963 for units that had not been mobilized, but was delayed until February for those that had been.

=== Activation of 916th Troop Carrier Group ===
As a result, the 916th Troop Carrier Group was established at Donaldson Air Force Base, South Carolina on 17 January 1963, as the headquarters for the 77th Troop Carrier Squadron, which had been stationed there since March 1958. Along with group headquarters, a Combat Support Squadron, Materiel Squadron and a Tactical Infirmary were organized to support the 77th.

The group's mission was to organize, recruit and train Air Force Reserve personnel in the tactical airlift of airborne forces, their equipment and supplies and delivery of these forces and materials by airdrop, landing or cargo extraction systems. The group was equipped with Fairchild C-119 Flying Boxcars for Tactical Air Command airlift operations.

The 916th was one of three C-119 groups assigned to the 435th Troop Carrier Wing in 1963, the others being the 915th Troop Carrier Group at Homestead Air Force Base, Florida and the 917th Troop Carrier Group at Barksdale Air Force Base, Louisiana.

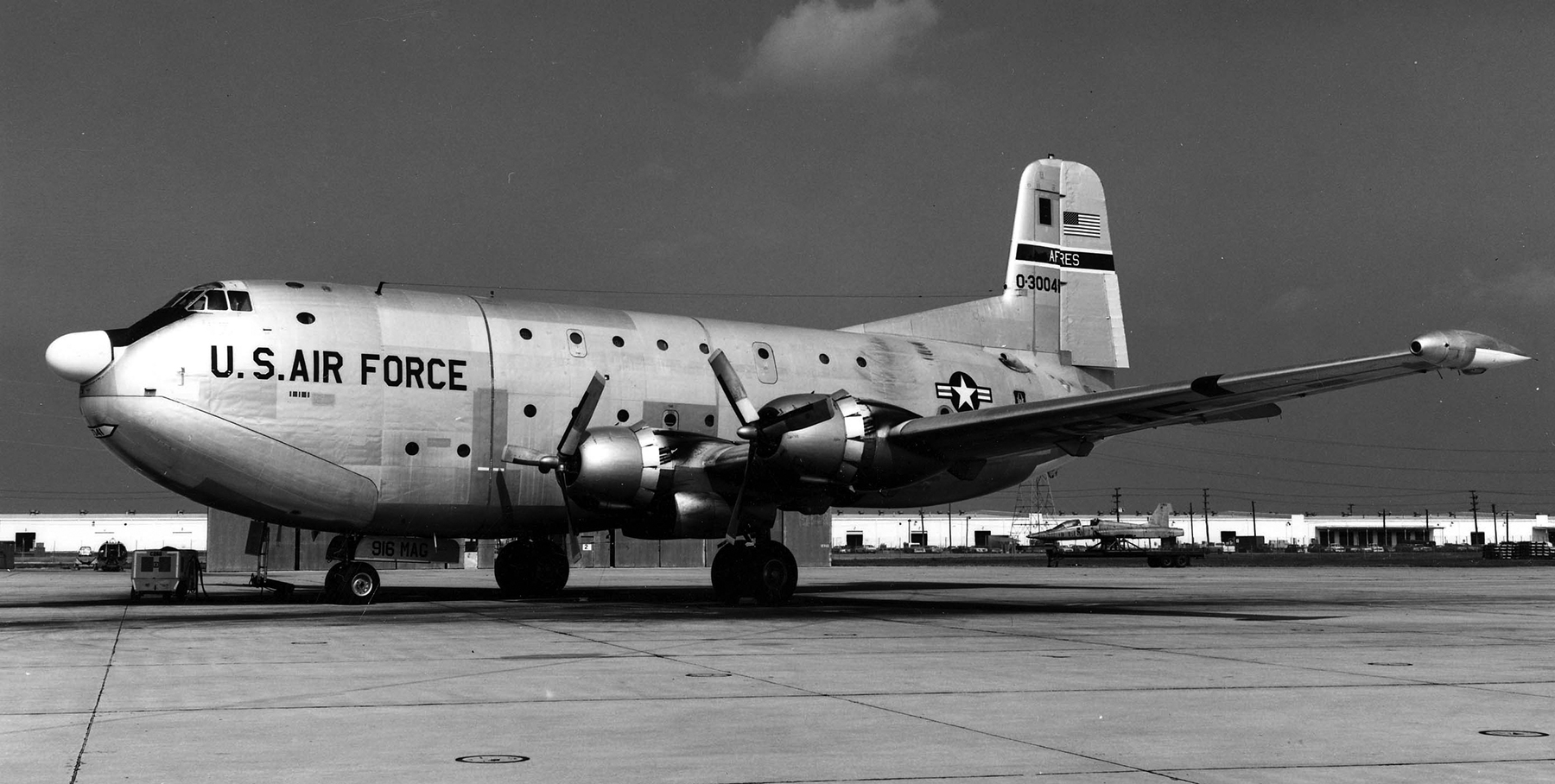
A 916th MAG C-124C Globemaster II.

In 1966 was equipped with Douglas C-124 Globemaster II airlifters, being a reserve unit of Military Airlift Command.

Conducted air and ground training activities, airlifting personnel and cargo in support of active duty forces worldwide. It has supported missions included military airlift to South Vietnam beginning in 1965 and to U.S. forces in the Dominican Republic during a 1965 crisis. It also participated in numerous humanitarian airlift missions.

=== Air refueling ===
Since October 1986 it has flown air mobility operational and training missions within and beyond the United States. It refueled aircraft and airlifted passengers and cargo for various training exercises and contingency and humanitarian operations around the world. In 2008, the 911th Air Refueling Squadron, an active duty unit, was attached to the group for operational control. February 8, 2020 the wing retired its last KC-135R tanker. On June 12, 2020, the wing accepted its first of twelve KC-46A.

== Lineage ==
- Established as the 916th Troop Carrier Group, Heavy and activated on 28 December 1962 (not organized)

Organized in the Reserve on 17 January 1963
Redesignated 916th Air Transport Group, Heavy on 1 December 1965
Redesignated 916th Military Airlift Group on 1 January 1966
Inactivated on 8 July 1972

- Redesignated 916th Air Refueling Group, Heavy (Associate) on 10 July 1986

Activated in the Reserve on 1 October 1986
Redesignated 916th Air Refueling Group (Associate) on 1 February 1992
Redesignated 916th Air Refueling Wing on 1 October 1994

=== Assignments ===
- Continental Air Command, 28 December 1962 (not organized)
- 435th Troop Carrier Wing, 17 January 1963
- 433d Troop Carrier Wing, 18 March 1963
- 442d Troop Carrier Wing, 1 July 1963
- 512th Troop Carrier Wing (later 512th Air Transport Wing, 512th Military Airlift Wing), 8 January 1965
- 433d Military Airlift Wing (later 433d Tactical Airlift Wing), 21 April 1971 – 8 July 1972
- 452d Air Refueling Wing, 1 October 1986
- 434th Air Refueling Wing (later 434th Wing, 434th Air Refueling Wing), 1 July 1987
- Twenty-Second Air Force, 1 October 1994
- Fourth Air Force, 1 April 1997 – present

=== Components ===
- 916th Operations Group: 1 October 1994 – present
- 77th Troop Carrier Squadron (later 77th Military Airlift Squadron, 77th Air Refueling Squadron): 17 January 1963 – 8 July 1972, 1 October 1986 – 1 August 1992

=== Stations ===
- Donaldson Air Force Base, South Carolina 17 January 1963
- Carswell Air Force Base, Texas, 1 April 1963 – 8 July 1972
- Seymour Johnson Air Force Base, North Carolina, 1 October 1986 – present

=== Aircraft ===
- Douglas C-124 Globemaster II (1963–1972)
- McDonnell Douglas KC-10 Extender (1986–1995)
- Boeing KC-135 Stratotanker, 1972–1985; 1995 – 2020
- Boeing KC-46 Pegasus, 2020 - present
