= Seymour Johnson Air Force Base =

US Air Force base at North Carolina, US

- Goldsboro, North Carolina in the United States of America
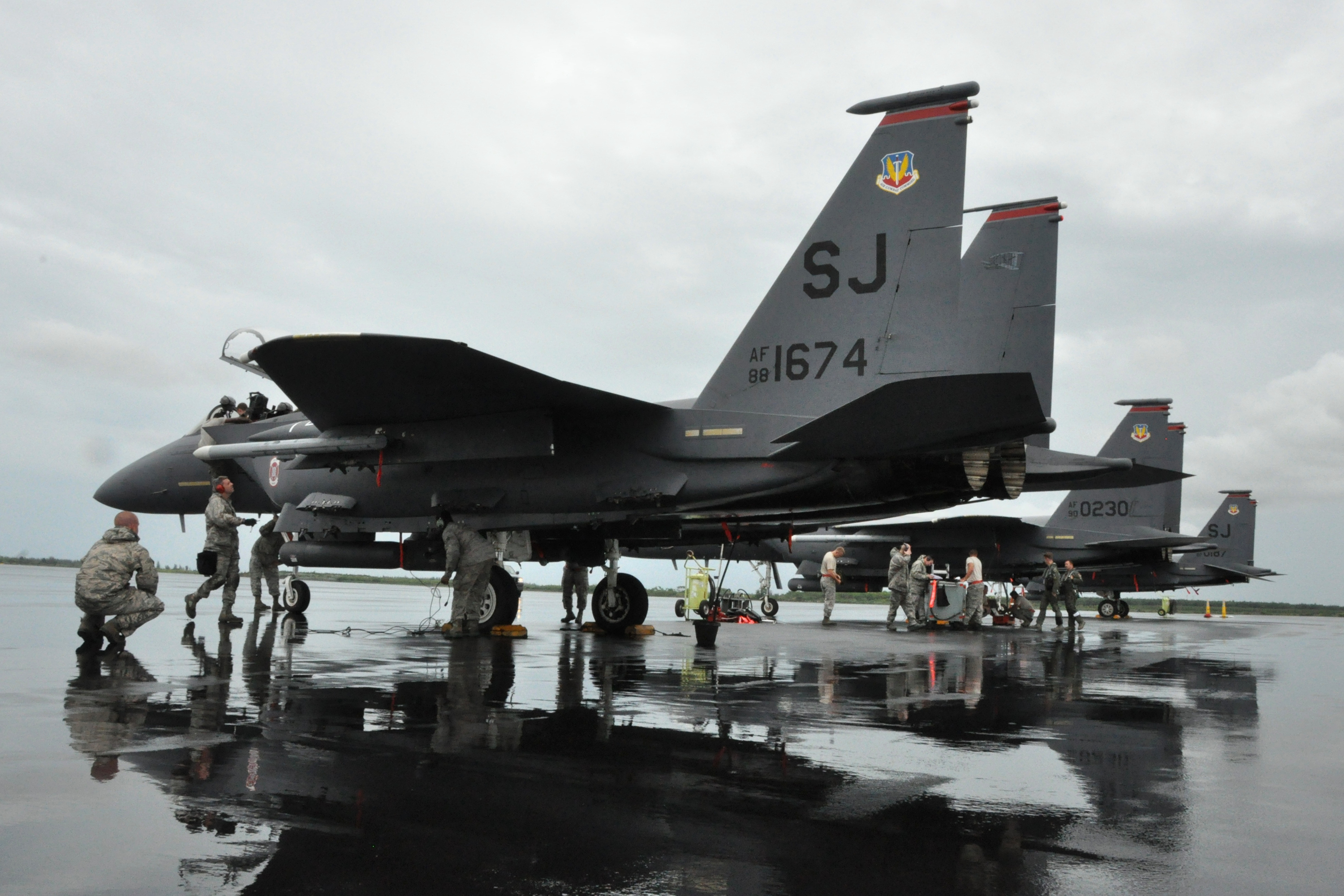
- F-15E Strike Eagles of the 4th Fighter Wing based at Seymour Johnson AFB.

Site information
- Type: U.S. Air Force Base
- Owner: Department of Defense
- Operator: U.S. Air Force
- Controlled by: Air Combat Command (ACC)
- Condition: Operational
- Website: www.seymourjohnson.af.mil/

Location
- Location in North America Location in the United States Location in North Carolina Seymour Johnson AFB (North Atlantic)
- Coordinates: 35°20′28″N 77°58′00″W

Site history
- Built: 1942
- In use: 1942 – present

Garrison information
- Current commander: Colonel Kurt Helphenstine
- Garrison: 4th Fighter Wing (Host); 916th Air Refueling Wing

Airfield information
- Identifiers: IATA: GSB, ICAO: KGSB, FAA LID: KGSB, WMO: 723066
- Elevation: 33.2 metres (109 ft) AMSL
Runways
Direction	Length and surface
08/26	3,584.4 metres (11,760 ft)

Seymour Johnson Air Force Base is a United States Air Force (USAF) base located in Goldsboro, North Carolina. The base is named for U.S. Navy Lt. Seymour A. Johnson, a test pilot from Goldsboro who died in an F4F Wildcat crash near Norbeck, Maryland, on March 5, 1941.

In December 1941, $168,811 were authorized for the construction of a U.S. Army Air Corps Technical Training School. Local officials began working to have the field named in honor of Lieutenant Johnson; it is the only USAF base named in honor of a naval officer. Seymour Johnson Field was deactivated in May 1946.

In late 1952, the U.S. Army Corps of Engineers arrived and demolished old buildings and began construction of new ones. Led by Goldsboro mayor Scott B. Berkeley Sr., local community leaders began a campaign to have the installation reopened. The efforts were successful, and on April 1, 1956, the renamed Seymour Johnson Air Force Base was opened for use by Tactical Air Command. Three months later, the 83rd Fighter Day Wing was assigned to the base as the primary unit.

In December 1957, the 4th Fighter Day Wing took up host responsibilities at the base from the 83rd Fighter Day Wing, which was inactivated.

== Based units ==
Units marked GSU are geographically separate units, which although based at Seymour Johnson, are subordinate to a parent unit based at another location.

=== United States Air Force ===
Air Combat Command

- Fifteenth Air Force
  - 4th Fighter Wing (Host Wing)
    - 4th Operations Group
      - 333d Fighter Squadron – F-15E Strike Eagle
      - 334th Fighter Squadron – F-15E Strike Eagle
      - 335th Fighter Squadron – F-15E Strike Eagle
      - 336th Fighter Squadron – F-15E Strike Eagle
      - 4th Operations Support Squadron
      - 4th Training Squadron
    - 4th Maintenance Group
      - 333d Fighter Generation Squadron
      - 334th Fighter Generation Squadron
      - 335th Fighter Generation Squadron
      - 336th Fighter Generation Squadron
      - 4th Component Maintenance Squadron
      - 4th Equipment Maintenance Squadron
      - 4th Munitions Squadron
    - 4th Medical Group
      - 4th Medical Support Squadron
      - 4th Healthcare Operations Squadron
      - 4th Operational Medical Readiness Squadron
    - 4th Mission Support Group
      - 4th Civil Engineer Squadron
      - 4th Communications Squadron
      - 4th Contracting Squadron
      - 4th Force Support Squadron
      - 4th Logistics Readiness Squadron
      - 4th Security Forces Squadron

Air Force Reserve Command

- Fourth Air Force
  - 916th Air Refueling Wing
    - 916th Operations Group
      - 77th Air Refueling Squadron – KC-46A Pegasus
      - 911th Air Refueling Squadron – KC-46A Pegasus
      - 916th Operations Support Squadron
    - 916th Mission Support Group
      - 916th Civil Engineer Flight
      - 916th Force Support Squadron
      - 916th Logistics Readiness Squadron
      - 916th Security Forces Squadron
    - 916th Maintenance Group
      - 916th Aerospace Medicine Squadron
      - 916th Aircraft Maintenance Squadron
      - 916th Maintenance Squadron
- Tenth Air Force
  - 944th Fighter Wing
    - 414th Fighter Group (GSU)
      - 307th Fighter Squadron – F-15E Strike Eagle
      - 414th Maintenance Squadron
- 567th RED HORSE Squadron

== See also ==
- 1961 Goldsboro B-52 crash
