= 77th Air Refueling Squadron =

US Air Force reserve unit

77th Air Refueling Squadron

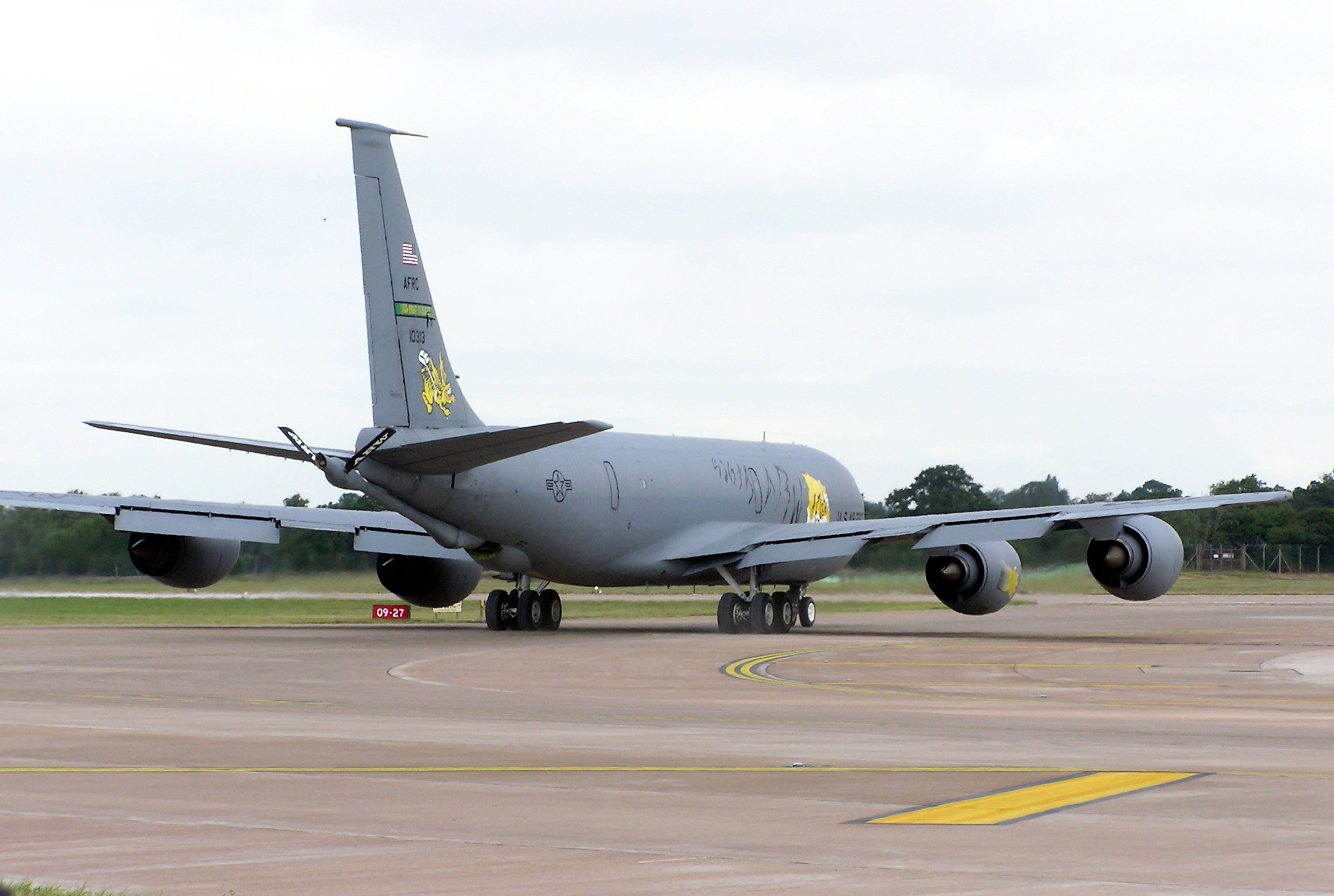
- Squadron KC-135R tanker taxis for take off from RAF Fairford
- Active: 1943–1946; 1947–1952; 1952–1972; 1985–present
- Country: United States
- Branch: United States Air Force
- Role: Aerial refueling
- Part of: Air Force Reserve Command
- Garrison/HQ: Seymour Johnson Air Force Base
- Nickname(s): The Totin' Tigers
- Engagements: Operation Overlord; Operation Market Garden; Operation Varsity
- Decorations: Distinguished Unit Citation; Air Force Outstanding Unit Award; RVGC w/ Palm

Insignia
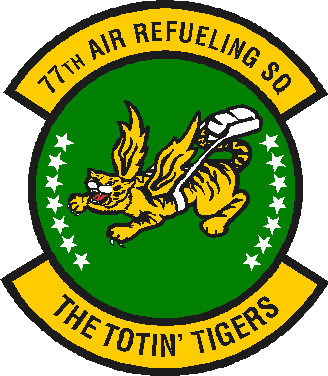
- 77th Air Refueling Squadron emblem (approved 4 May 1960)

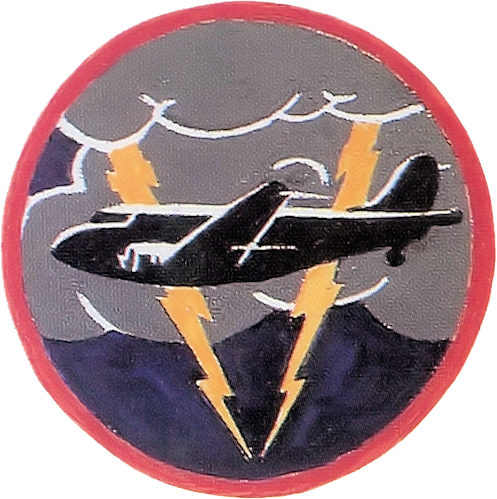
- 77th Troop Carrier Squadron emblem

The 77th Air Refueling Squadron is a United States Air Force Reserve squadron, assigned to the 916th Operations Group, stationed at Seymour Johnson Air Force Base, North Carolina.

The unit was first activated as a Douglas C-47 Skytrain transport unit that saw combat with the 435th Troop Carrier Group in Western Europe. The squadron flew paratroopers on airborne assaults on Normandy (Operation Overlord); Southern France (Operation Dragoon); the Netherlands (Operation Market Garden), and Germany (Operation Varsity). It also flew combat resupply missions in the relief of Bastogne in 1945. The 77th was awarded a Distinguished Unit Citation for its actions during the Normandy invasion.

The squadron was activated in the reserve in 1947. It was called to active duty in March 1951 for the Korean War, serving at its home station, Miami International Airport. It returned to reserve duty in December 1952. In November 1959 it was assigned directly to the 435th Troop Carrier Wing in a reorganization of Continental Air Command reserve units.

== Overview ==
The squadron currently operates the KC-46 Pegasus aircraft conducting aerial refueling missions.

== History ==
=== World War II ===
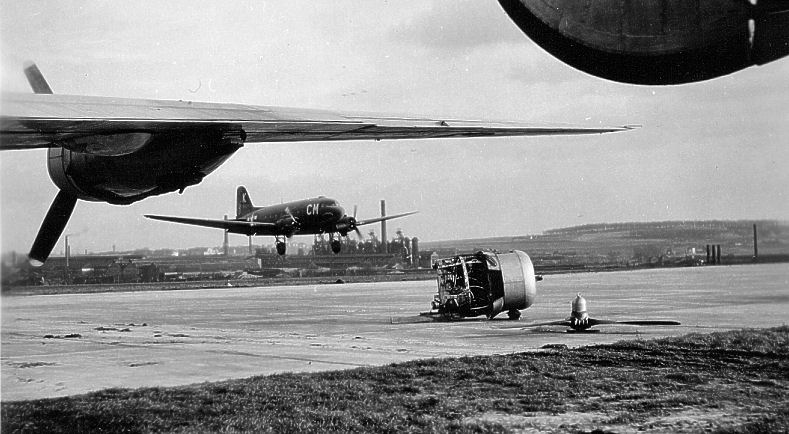
435th Troop Carrier Group C-47 landing

The squadron was first activated at Bowman Field, Kentucky in February 1943, as one of the original squadrons of the 435th Troop Carrier Group. The group used Douglas C-47 Skytrains and Douglas C-53 Skytrooopers in preparing for duty overseas with Ninth Air Force.

The 77th left the United States in October 1943, arriving at RAF Langar, England, in early November. On arrival, it began training for participation in the airborne operation over Normandy. The squadron flew its first combat missions on D-Day by dropping paratroopers of 101st Airborne Division near Cherbourg Naval Base. The unit towed Waco CG-4A and Airspeed Horsa gliders carrying reinforcements to the same location that afternoon and on the following morning. The squadron received a Distinguished Unit Citation for its part in Operation Overlord, the Normandy invasion.

The squadron began transport services following the landings in France and intermittently engaged in missions of this type until V-E Day In these operations the 77th hauled supplies such as serum, blood plasma, radar sets, clothing, rations, and ammunition. It also evacuated wounded personnel to Allied hospitals.

The squadron interrupted these supply and evacuation missions to train for and participate in three major airborne assaults. It was part of a detachment of three squadrons from the 435th Group that moved to Tarquinia Airfield, Italy in July 1944 for Operation Dragoon, the invasion of Southern France. The detachment dropped paratroopers over the assault area on 15 August and also released gliders carrying troops and equipment such as jeeps, guns, and ammunition. The following day it flew a resupply mission over France, then transported supplies to bases in Italy before returning to England at the end of the month.

In September 1944 the squadron participated in Operation Market Garden the unsuccessful airborne operation intended to seize bridges across the Meuse River in the Netherlands, dropping paratroops of the 82d and 101st Airborne Divisions and releasing gliders carrying reinforcements. During the Battle of the Bulge, the unit delivered supplies to isolated combat positions of the 101st Airborne and 7th Armored Divisions in Bastogne and Marcouray, Belgium.

The unit moved to Bretigny Airfield, France in February 1945 to prepare for Operation Varsity, the airborne assault across the Rhine River. Each squadron aircraft participating in this operation towed two gliders transporting troops and equipment to the east bank of the Rhine near Wesel on 24 March. The unit then flew resupply missions to Germany in support of ground forces.

The squadron transported supplies to occupation forces in Germany and evacuated Allied prisoners of war after V-E Day. The squadron and the 435th Group returned to the United States in August and the group was inactivated on 15 November 1945.

=== Post war troop carrier operations ===
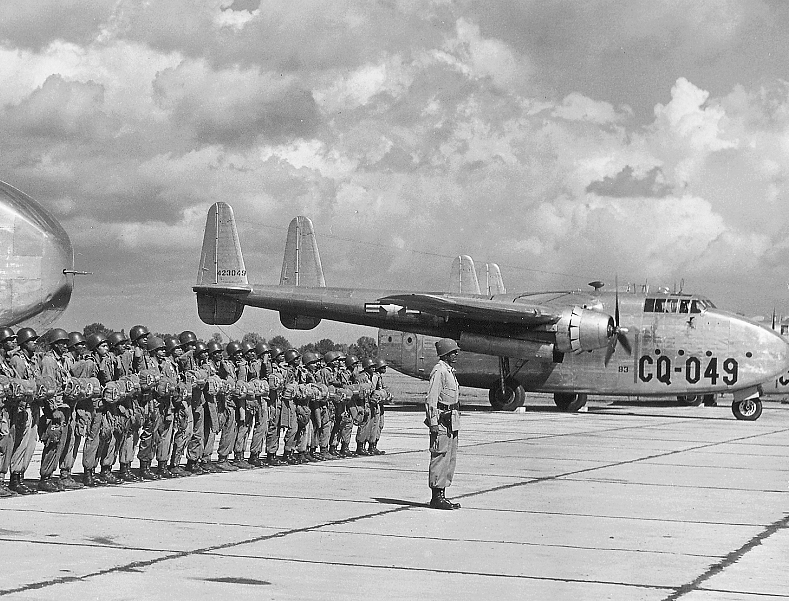
C-82s of the 316th Troop Carrier Group

Shortly before the 435th Troop Carrier Group was inactivated, the squadron was moved to Pope Field, North Carolina, where it became part of the 316th Troop Carrier Group. The squadron initially operated Curtiss C-46 Commandos with the 316th but began converting to Fairchild C-82 Packet transports. With the Army Air Forces shrinking in size, the squadron was inactivated in June 1946 when the 316th reduced in size to three operational squadrons.

=== Air Force Reserve ===
==== Troop carrier operations ====
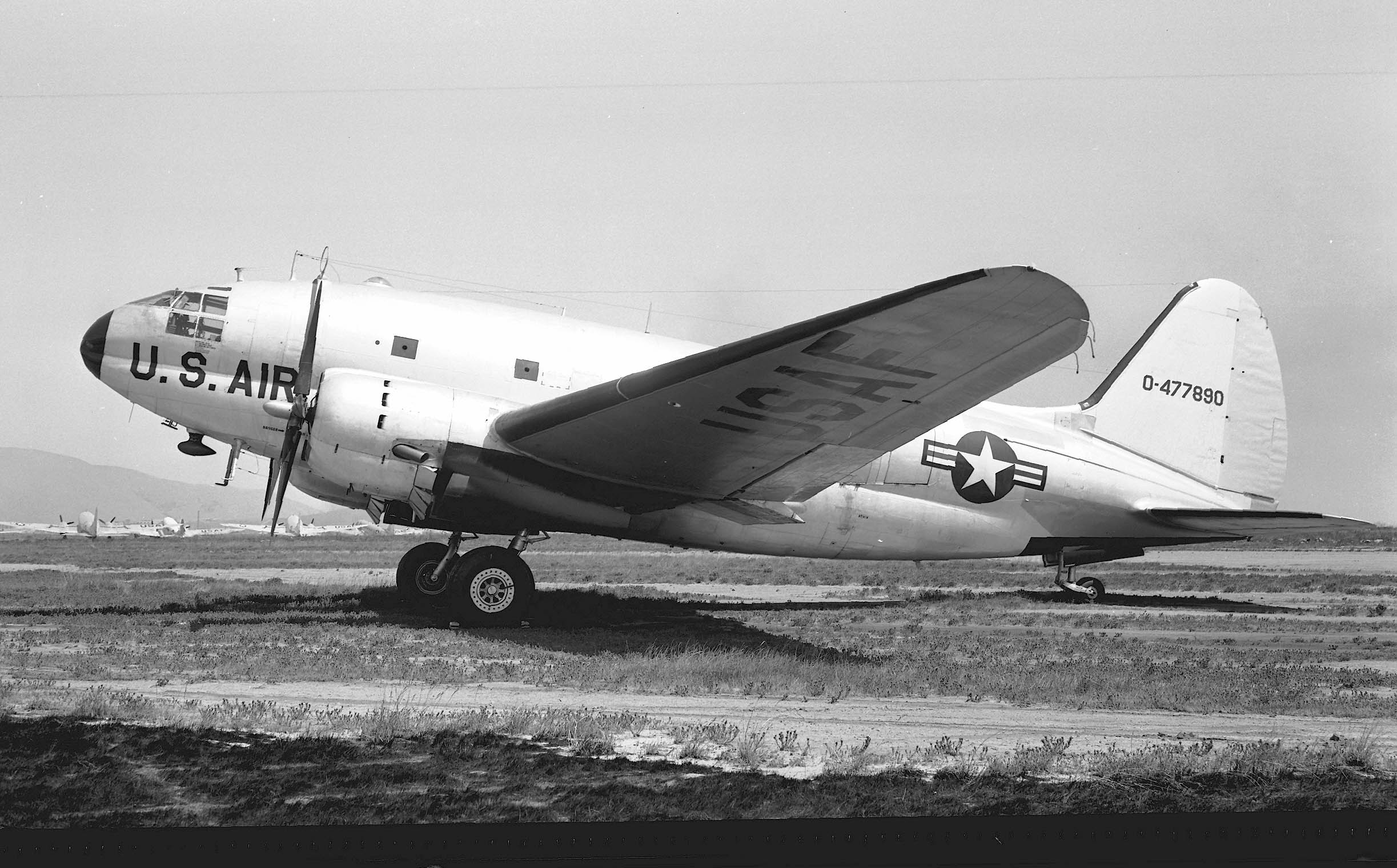
Curtiss C-46D

The squadron was once again activated as a reserve unit under Air Defense Command at Miami International Airport, Florida on 15 July 1947. It was again assigned to the 435th Troop Carrier Group, located at Morrison Field, Florida. The squadron was nominally a Curtiss C-46 Commando unit, but it is not clear to what extent it was equipped with tactical aircraft while at Orlando.

In June 1949, Continental Air Command, which had assumed the responsibility for training reserve units from Air Defense Command in 1948, reorganized its reserve units under the wing base organization system. As part of this reorganization and unit reductions required by President Truman's reduced 1949 defense budget, the 435th Group and its remaining squadrons joined the 77th at Miami International Airport, where it was assigned to the newly formed 435th Troop Carrier Wing. The squadron was manned at only 25% of the strength of a regular unit.

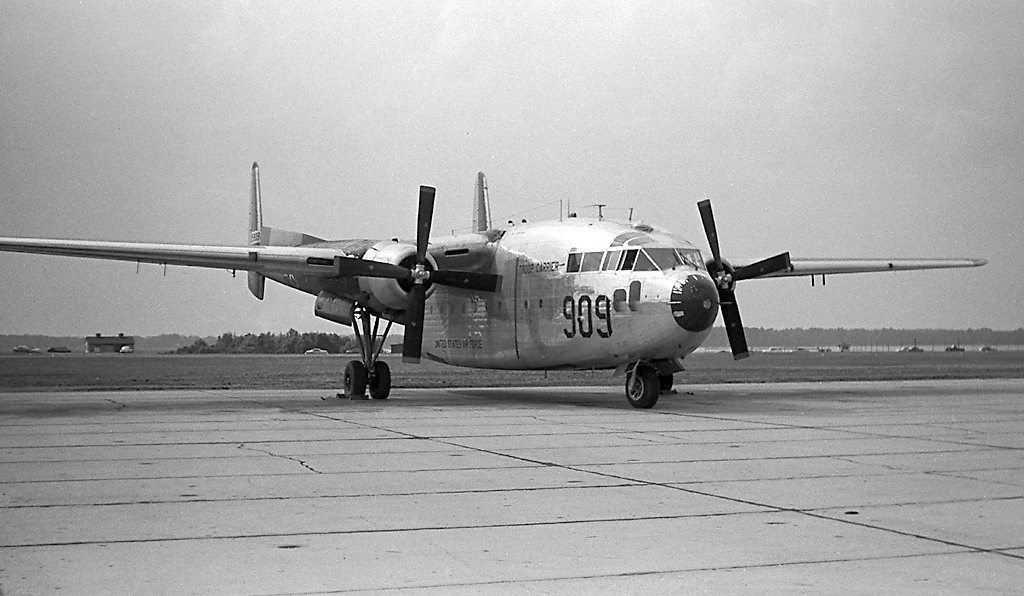
Fairchild C-119G Flying Boxcar

At Miami, the squadron trained with C-46s under the supervision of the active duty 2585th Air Force Reserve Training Center. The squadron was ordered into active service in March 1951 as a result of the Korean War. Along with other reserve units called to active duty, it formed Tactical Air Command's Eighteenth Air Force. The squadron's initial function was to train C-46 aircrews for service in Korea. The 77th also trained with Fairchild C-119 Flying Boxcars. Although it remained at Miami, the unit deployed twice while on active duty: to Laurinburg-Maxton Airport, North Carolina from 21 July until 1 September 1951 and to Grenier Air Force Base, New Hampshire from 2 January to 3 March 1952. It was relieved from active duty and inactivated on 1 December 1952 and its mission, personnel and equipment were transferred to the regular 745th Troop Carrier Squadron, which was activated the same day.

The squadron was activated as a reserve unit the same day at the same station, but with the personnel and equipment of the inactivating 813th Troop Carrier Squadron. In the reserve, the squadron once again flew the Curtiss Commandos. By 1956, the unit was flying overseas missions, particularly in the Caribbean area and in Central America. In addition, for the first time as a reserve unit, its flying was performed in unit tactical aircraft, rather than in trainers.

In 1957, the squadron once again received C-119s.

==== Airlift and air refueling operations ====
The squadron trained for and flew airlift missions in the reserve for most of the period of 1947–1972, including airlift to Southeast Asia during the Vietnam War. Since October 1985 it has flown air refueling and air transport missions as needed worldwide, taking part in many contingency and humanitarian operations, including air refueling support during the U.S. invasion of Panama, December 1989 – January 1990 and the Persian Gulf War in 1991.

February 8, 2020, the wing retired its last KC-135R tanker and converted to KC-46 Pegasus tankers in the summer of 2020.

=== Operations and decorations ===
- Combat Operations. Airlift to Southeast Asia during the Vietnam War. Air refueling support during the U.S. incursion into Panama, Dec 1989 – Jan 1990 and the Persian Gulf War in 1991.
- Campaigns. World War II: Rome-Arno; Normandy; Northern France; Southern France; Rhineland; Ardennes-Alsace; Central Europe; Operation Just Cause; Operation Desert Storm; Operation Joint Forge; Operation Enduring Freedom; Operation Iraqi Freedom; Operation Odyssey Dawn
- Decorations. Distinguished Unit Citation: France, [6–7] Jun 1944. Air Force Outstanding Unit Awards: 1 August 1967 – 25 October 1968; 1 August 1990 – 31 July 1992; 2 August 1992 – 1 August 1994. Republic of Vietnam Gallantry Cross with Palm: 1 April 1966 – 19 May 1972.

== Lineage ==
- Constituted as the 77th Troop Carrier Squadron on 30 January 1943

Activated on 25 February 1943
Inactivated on 10 June 1946

- Activated in the reserve on 15 July 1947

Redesignated 77th Troop Carrier Squadron, Medium on 26 June 1949
Ordered to Active Service on 1 March 1951
Inactivated on 1 December 1952

- Activated in the reserve on 1 December 1952

Redesignated 77th Troop Carrier Squadron, Heavy on 8 May 1961
Ordered to active service on 1 October 1961
Relieved from active duty on 27 August 1962

- Redesignated 77th Air Transport Squadron, Heavy on 1 December 1965

Redesignated 77th Military Airlift Squadron on 1 January 1966
Inactivated on 8 July 1972

- Redesignated 77th Air Refueling Squadron, Heavy (Associate) on 14 August 1985

Activated in the reserve on 1 October 1985
Redesignated 77th Air Refueling Squadron (Associate) on 1 February 1992
Redesignated 77th Air Refueling Squadron on 1 October 1994

=== Assignments ===
- 435th Troop Carrier Group, 25 February 1943
- IX Troop Carrier Command, 15 November 1945
- 316th Troop Carrier Group, 11 December 1945 – 10 June 1946
- 435th Troop Carrier Group, 15 July 1947 – 1 December 1952
- 435th Troop Carrier Group, 1 December 1952
- 435th Troop Carrier Wing, 14 April 1959
- 916th Troop Carrier Group (later 916 Air Transport Group, 916 Military Airlift Group), 17 January 1963 – 8 July 1972
- 452d Air Refueling Wing, 1 October 1985
- 916th Air Refueling Group, 1 October 1986
- 916th Operations Group, 1 August 1992 – present

=== Stations ===
- Bowman Field, Kentucky, 25 February 1943
- Sedalia Army Air Field, Missouri, 4 May 1943
- Pope Field, North Carolina, 2 July 1943
- Baer Field, Indiana, 9–13 October 1943
- RAF Langar (AAF-490), England, 4 November 1943
- RAF Welford (AAF-474), England, January 1944
- Bretigny Airfield (A-48), France, 19 February – June 1945
- Baer Field, Indiana, 5 August 1945
- Kellogg Field, Michigan, 23 August 1945
- Pope Field, North Carolina, 29 October 1945 – 10 June 1946
- Miami International Airport, Florida, 15 July 1947 – 1 December 1952
- Miami International Airport, Florida, 1 December 1952
- Pinellas County International Airport, Florida, 18 August 1956
- Alvin Callender Field, Louisiana, 16 November 1957
- Donaldson Air Force Base, South Carolina, 25 March 1958
- Carswell Air Force Base, Texas, 1 April 1963 – 8 July 1972
- Seymour Johnson Air Force Base, North Carolina, 1 October 1985 – present

=== Aircraft ===
- Douglas C-47 Skytrain (1943–1946)
- Douglas C-53 Skytrooper (1943–1945)
- Airspeed Horsa (1943–1944)
- Waco CG-4 (1943–1946)
- Curtiss C-46 Commando (1945–1946, 1951, 1952–1957)
- Fairchild C-82 Packet (1946)
- North American T-6 Texan (1947–1951)
- Beechcraft T-7 Navigator (1947–1951)
- Beechcraft T-11 Kansan (1947–1951)
- Fairchild C-119 Flying Boxcar (1957–1961)
- Douglas C-124 Globemaster II (1961–1972)
- McDonnell Douglas KC-10 Extender (1985–1994)
- Boeing KC-135 Stratotanker (1995 – 2020)
- Boeing KC-46 Pegasus (2020 - Present)
