= 4th Operations Group =

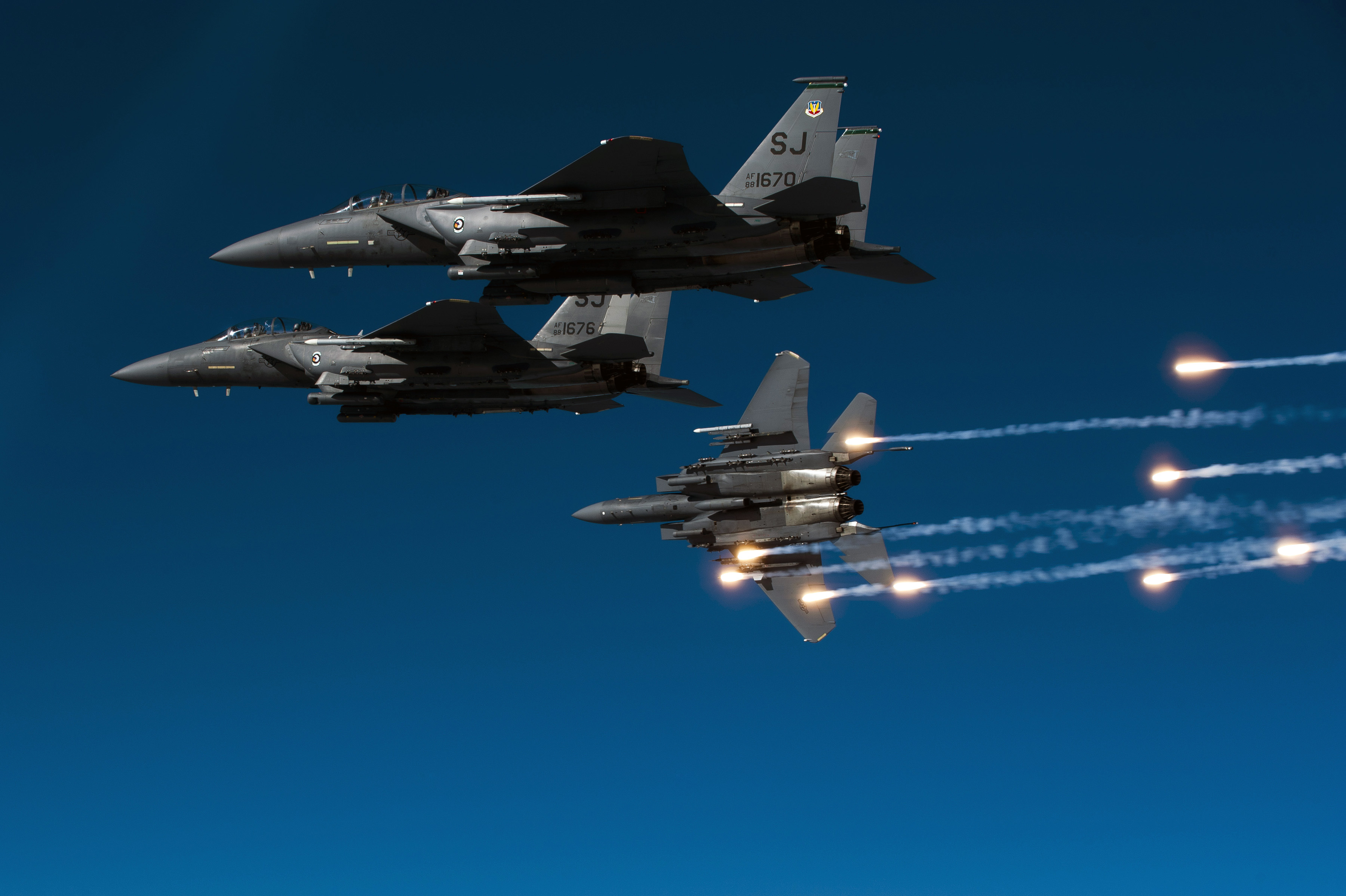
- F-15E Strike Eagle aircraft from the 335th Fighter Squadron releases flares during a local training mission over North Carolina, 17 December 2010.
- Active: 1942–1945, 1946–1957, 1991–present
- Country: United States
- Branch: United States Air Force
- Type: Operations Group
- Garrison/HQ: Seymour Johnson AFB, North Carolina
- Motto: Fourth But First
- Engagements: World War II EAME Theater; Korean War

- Decorations: Distinguished Unit Citation (3x); Air Force Meritorious Unit Award; Air Force Outstanding Unit Award (5x); Republic of Korea Presidential Unit Citation (2x)

Commanders
- Current commander: Colonel Kellen D. Sick
- Notable commanders: Colonel Donald Blakeslee; General John C. Meyer; LtCol Bud Mahurin; LtCol Ralph Jodice

Insignia
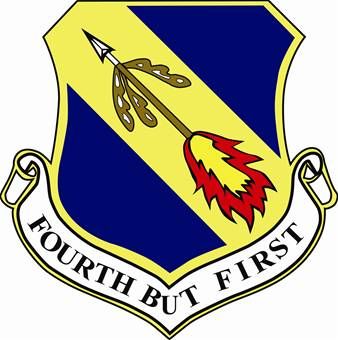
- 4th Operations Group emblem

The 4th Operations Group (4 OG) is the flying component of the 4th Fighter Wing, assigned to the United States Air Force Air Combat Command. The group is stationed at Seymour Johnson Air Force Base, North Carolina.

The 4 OG is a direct descendant of the World War II 4th Fighter Group, the United States Army Air Forces VIII Fighter Command unit formed from the members of the Royal Air Force (RAF) Eagle Squadrons. These fighter squadrons of the Royal Air Force formed prior to the United States entry into World War II with volunteer pilots from the United States.

When the United States entered the war these units, and the American pilots in them, were transferred to the United States Eighth Air Force, with the RAF Nos. 71, 121, and 133 Squadrons becoming the 334th, 335th and 336th Fighter Squadrons of the 4th Fighter Group, 65th Fighter Wing of the VIII Fighter Command.

Today, the 4 OG consists of two operational fighter squadrons, the 335th and 336th; two fighter training squadrons, the 333d and 334th; and two support squadrons. The group provides command and control for two operational F-15E Strike Eagle squadrons and is responsible for conducting the Air Force's only F-15E training operation, qualifying crews to serve in worldwide combat-ready positions.

== Assigned Units ==
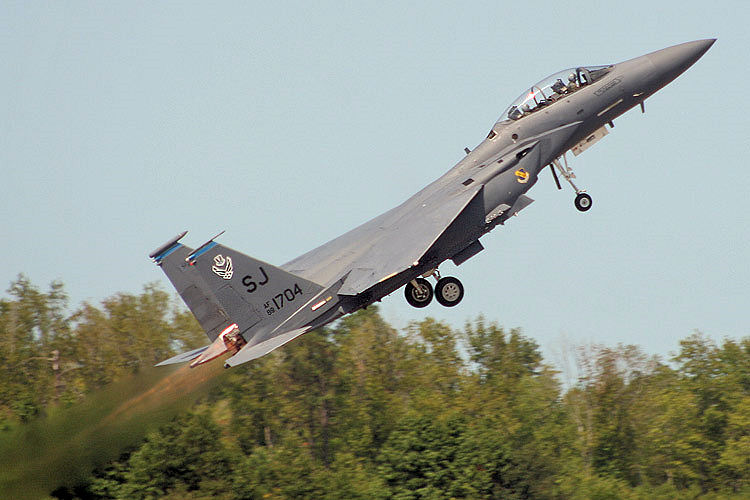
McDonnell Douglas F-15E-46-MC Strike Eagle 88-1704 of the 334th Fighter Squadron

The 4th Operations Group (Tail Code: SJ) consists of the following squadrons:

- 333d Fighter Squadron "Lancers" F-15E (Red tail stripe)

Activated on 8 December 1957. F-15E training squadron

- 334th Fighter Squadron "Fighting Eagles" F-15E (Blue tail stripe)

Established 22 August 1942, formerly No. 71 Squadron RAF. F-15E training squadron

- 335th Fighter Squadron "Chiefs" F-15E (Green tail stripe)

Established 22 August 1942, formerly No. 121 Squadron RAF, F-15E operational squadron

- 336th Fighter Squadron "Rocketeers" F-15E (Yellow tail stripe)

Established 22 August 1942, formerly No. 133 Squadron RAF, F-15E operational squadron

- 4th Operations Support Squadron "Silver Hawks"

Responsible for all facets of airfield operations, air traffic control, weather, aircrew life support and training, weapons and tactics training, airspace scheduling, range ops and wing flying hour program.

- 4th Training Squadron "Black Cats"

== History ==
For additional history, see Eagle Squadrons and 4th Fighter Wing

=== World War II ===
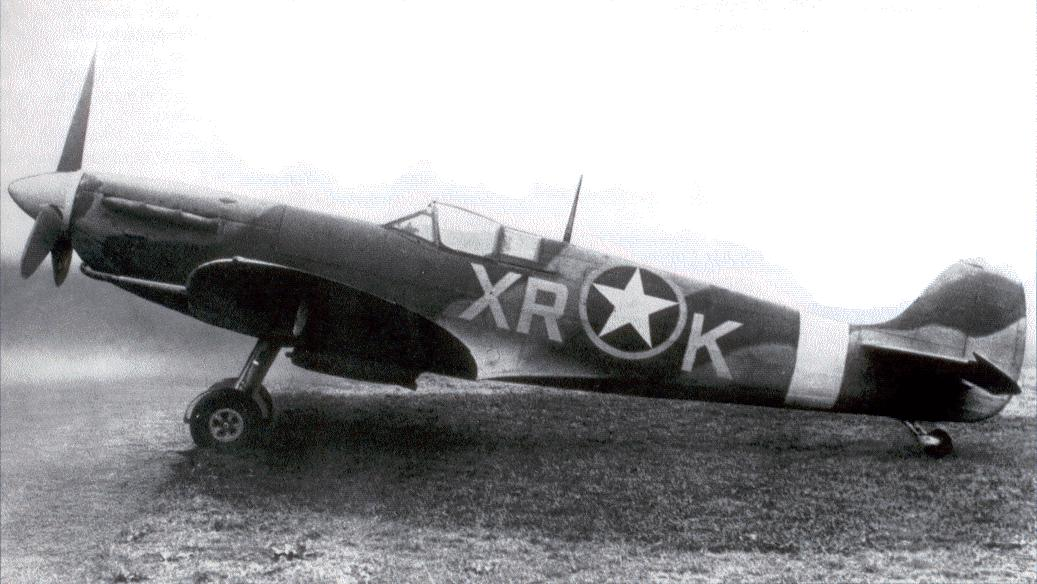
Spitfire MK V of the 334th Fighter Squadron, 4th Fighter Group in 1942. Note the RAF 71 Eagle Squadron markings on the fuselage with the USAAF emblem overlaid over the RAF roundel.

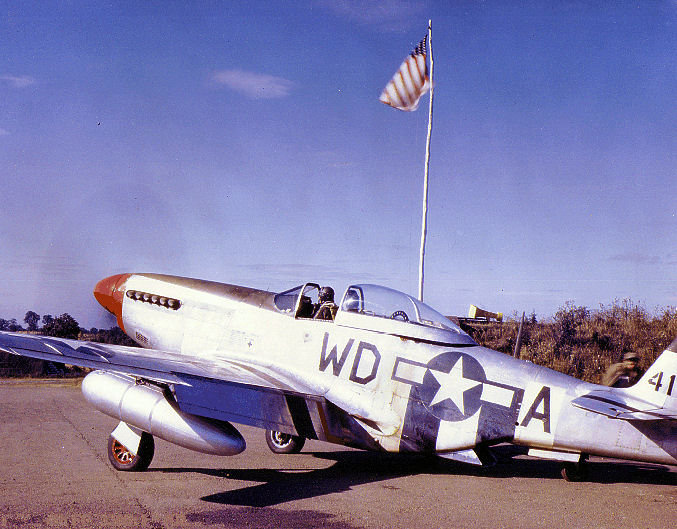
335th FS P-51D, 1944

The unit was activated in England in September 1942. The initial cadre for the group were former U.S. members of RAF Eagle Squadrons who had served in combat over Europe from October 1942 to April 1945.

The American fliers of the Eagle Squadrons, which had begun fighting ten months before the Attack on Pearl Harbor, were taken into the U.S. Army Air Forces to form the 4th Fighter Group (FG)- based upon VIII Fighter Command order of 12 September 1942. This VIII Fighter Command order originated based upon the recommendation and urgent requirements provided by Brigadier General Hunter and his USAAF staff at RAF Bushey Hall. An official joint RAF/USAAF ceremony was conducted at RAF North Weald, near to the town of Epping, Essex, at noon, Tuesday, 29 September 1942. It was held after a typical brisk English rainstorm that left a misty, overcast sky and wet grounds for the remainder of the day. The ceremony was held adjacent to the airfield administration building on the concrete parking area. Present at this ceremony included USAAF leaders Brigadier General Frank O'Driscoll Hunter and Major General Carl A. Spaatz, Brigadier General Ira C. Eaker, U.S. and English war correspondents, Air Marshal Harold Edwards (RCAF officer), along with Air Chief Marshal Sir Sholto Douglas, RAF. The ceremony officiated both the commissioning of the 4th Fighter Group under the command of Colonel Edward W. Anderson (Manhattan, Kansas) USAAF, and the establishment of the airfield as a new airbase of the 4th Fighter Group. With such ceremonies presentation of awards are usually conducted. Along with Colonel Anderson, Brigadier General Hunter stepped forward and awarded these combat-experienced American pilots. Squadron commander William James Daley (Hemphill, Texas) was made a major in the USAAF and given his USAAF pilot wings, commencing command of the 335th FS that afternoon. The two other squadron commanders promoted to major and given their USAAF pilot wings of the USAAF were Carroll Warren McColpin (Buffalo New York) of the 336th FS, and Gregory Agustus "Gus" Daymond (Great Falls, Montana) of the 334th FS. The remaining 31 American pilots received their USAAF wings, as well.

Following this award presentation, Air Marshal Douglas, who had earlier complained to Lieutenant General Henry H. Arnold accusing these very same combat-experienced American pilots as prima donnas, stepped forward to the BBC and U.S. microphones with his typed-speech in hand and spoke to the assembled joint air force officers and enlisted personnel standing at attention on the wet concrete flightline. Paying tribute to these American pilots in his typical clipped, political speech he said:

I want to wish on that, my first opportunity of addressing the Eagle Squadrons, together on one station, my words should have been other than words of farewell. We of Fighter Command deeply regret this parting. The U.S. Army Air Corps- their gain is very much the Royal Air Force's loss. The loss to the Luftwaffe will no doubt continue as before. You were the vanguard of that great host of your compatriots who are now helping us to make these islands a base from which to launch that great offensive which we all desire. Goodbye and thank you Eagle Squadrons, numbers 71, 121 and 133, and good hunting to you.

Douglas was followed by General Spaatz who gave an official welcome to his battle-proven American fighter pilots:

Men of the Eagle Squadrons, I welcome you to the Eighth Air Force. Before turning you over to your new commanding officer, General Hunter, I must express my appreciation for the contribution which the ranks of the Royal Air Force have with you filled up your splendid organization. It's with pleasure and pride I welcome you into the VIII Fighter Command- the United States Army Air Forces.

After these two speeches, the Royal Air Force and newly established 4th Fighter Group personnel marched by in "pass & review". Following the closing of this ceremony, pilots and guests were shown the new USAAF star (refer to: USAAF unit identification aircraft markings) that was earlier painted over the RAF emblem on the Spitfire V aircraft of the newly created 334th, 335th and 336th USAAF squadrons.

The 4th Fighter Group began its historic rise to fame primarily following the appointment of Donald Blakeslee as the Group's Commander on 1 January 1944. Blakeslee successfully had the group re-equipped with Mustangs, and it is almost certain that on 6 March 1944, he was the first American plane over Berlin in his Mustang. The Fourth destroyed more enemy planes in the air and on the ground than any other fighter group of Eighth Air Force. The group operated first with Spitfires but changed to P-47s in March 1943 and to P-51s in late February early March 1944.

On numerous occasions the 4 FG escorted B-17/B-24 bombers that attacked factories, submarine pens, V-weapon sites, and other targets in France, the Low Countries, or Germany. The group went out sometimes with a small force of bombers to draw up the enemy's fighters so they could be destroyed in aerial combat. At other times the 4th attacked the enemy's air power by strafing and dive-bombing airfields. They also hit troops, supply depots, roads, bridges, rail lines, and trains.

The unit participated in the intensive campaign against the German Air Force and aircraft industry during Big Week, 20–25 February 1944. They received a Distinguished Unit Citation for aggressiveness in seeking out and destroying enemy aircraft and in attacking enemy air bases during the period 5 March – 24 April 1944.

The 4 FG flew interdiction and counter-air missions during the invasion of Normandy in June 1944 and supported the airborne invasion of the Netherlands in September. They participated in the Battle of the Bulge, December 1944 – January 1945, and provided cover for the airborne assault across the Rhine in March 1945.

=== Cold War ===
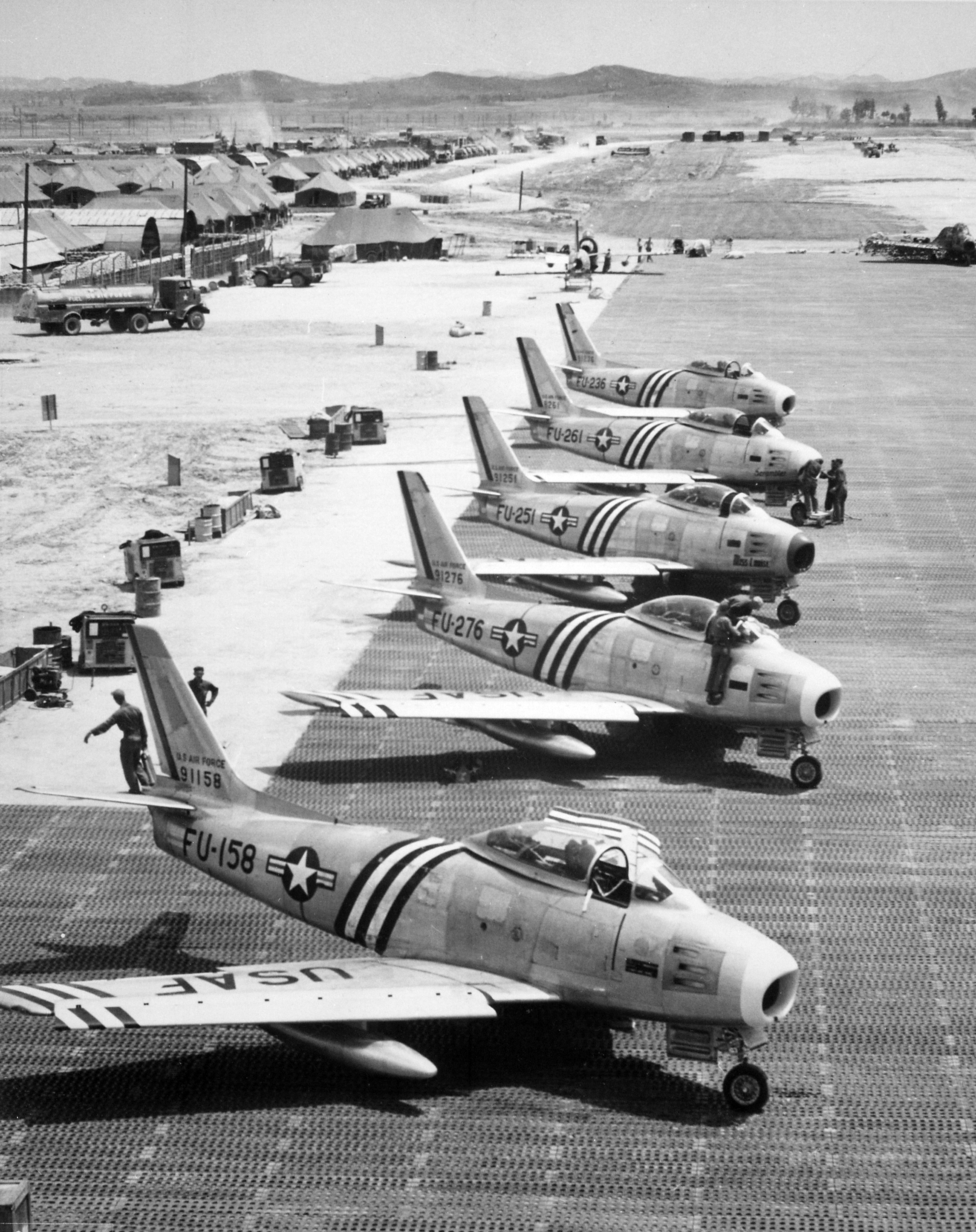
4th Fighter-Interceptor Group North American F-86 Sabres, South Korea, 1951

The 4th Fighter Group was inactivated at Camp Kilmer, New Jersey, on 10 November 1945. The unit was reactivated at Selfridge Field, Michigan, 9 September 1946, as the United States began to rearm due to Cold War pressures.

On 15 August 1947, under the Wing/Base (Hobson) reorganization plan, the 4th Fighter Wing was formed, and the 4th Fighter Group became its subordinate operational flying component. Following a period of training with F-80 Shooting Star aircraft, the 4th Fighter Group transitioned to F-86 Sabre jets in March 1949, just in time for advanced training and entry into the Korean War.

In December 1950, the 4th Fighter Wing's flying component (now the 4th Fighter-Interceptor Group) was the first unit to commit F-86 Sabre jets to that conflict. Lt Col Bruce H. Hinton shot down a MiG-15 on 17 December during the first Sabre mission of the war. Four days later, Lt Col John C. Meyer, a World War II ace, led a flight of eight sabres against 15 MiGs in the first major all-jet fighter battle in history. The flight downed six MiGs without sustaining any losses.

By the end of the war airmen of the 4th Fighter-Interceptor Group had destroyed 502 enemy aircraft (54 percent of the total), becoming the top fighter unit of the Korean War. Twenty-four pilots achieved ace status. With the 4th Fighter-Interceptor Wing, the group moved to Japan following the Korean armistice in 1953, continuing training and tours to Korea. The group was inactivated on 8 December 1957 with its component squadrons assigned directly to the wing as the Air Force reorganized its wings into the tri-deputate structure.

=== Modern era ===
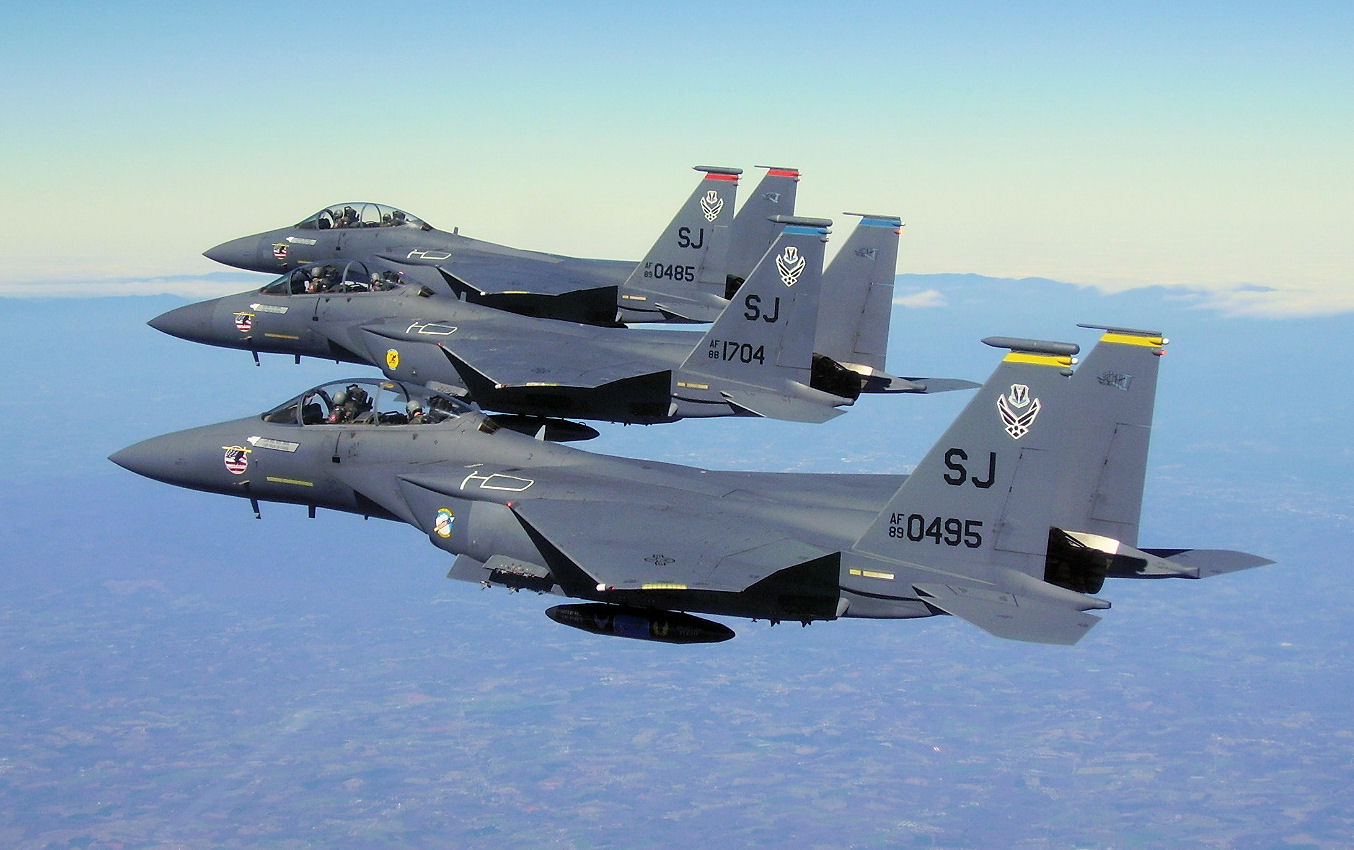
4th Operations Group McDonnell Douglas F-15E Strike Eagles 89-0495 (336 FS), 88-1704 (334 FS) and 89-0485 (333 FS)

On 22 April 1991, the 4th Operations Group was activated as a result of the 4th Tactical Fighter Wing implementing the USAF objective wing organization. Upon activation, the 4 OG retained the lineage and history of the 4th Fighter Group. The 4 OG was assigned the 334th, 335th and 336th Fighter Squadrons upon activation, all equipped with the F-15E Strike Eagle.

In addition to the objective wing organization, the 4 TFW became the Air Force's first composite wing and was redesignated the 4th Wing. The 4th Wing incorporated under it all the people, KC-10 aircraft, and assets of the 68th Air Refueling Wing, a Strategic Air Command unit, with the 344th and 911th Air Refueling Squadron (ARS) being assigned to the 4 OG.

With the reorganization of the USAF major command structure, the unit's parent organization became part of the new Air Combat Command on 1 June 1992.

More changes occurred in the early 1990s. The 911 ARS was reassigned to Air Mobility Command bases in 1994 and 1995 and the F-15E formal training unit moved to Seymour Johnson in 1994 and 1995. The 333d Fighter Squadron returned to Seymour Johnson to accommodate the training mission and was assigned to the 4 OG. To accommodate the need to train more F-15E aircrews, the 334th Fighter Squadron became a training squadron on 1 January 1996.

Fewer resources and the need to use all Air Force assets to meet increased operational commitments called for yet another reorganization as the 20th Century came to a close. The expeditionary aerospace force concept was implemented to conform to the Air Force vision to organize, train, equip, deploy and sustain itself in the 21st Century global security environment. Under the concept, the 4 OG is one of two on-call rapid response aerospace expeditionary groups. The Fourth was the first to assume this on-call mission on 1 October 1999.

=== Global War on Terrorism ===
In October 2001, in response to the 11 September terrorist attacks on the United States, the 4 OG began flying Operation NOBLE EAGLE sorties, the first of its kind for the wing, providing coastal protection for Homeland Defense.

In January 2002, the 4 OG arrived in Kuwait in support of Operations SOUTHERN WATCH and ENDURING FREEDOM, flying missions over Iraq and Afghanistan. On 1 March 2002, Operation ANACONDA was launched, and the group's mission was to provide close air support into Afghanistan. Operation ANACONDA ended 21 March 2002 with the 4 OG's greatest highlight being their performance at Roberts Ridge. Members of the 335th Fighter Squadron successfully suppressed enemy fire from al-Qaida troops, as Army and Air Force personnel retrieved stranded and fallen comrades.

In January and February 2003, the 4th Operations Group joined other operational units in Southeast Asia. Two F-15E fighter squadrons deployed to Southwest Asia in support of OSW, which would later transition into support for Operation IRAQI FREEDOM. On 18 April 2003, members of the 4th Operations Group returned to Seymour Johnson AFB after contributing to the initial U.S. led coalition invasion in Operation IRAQI FREEDOM.

== Lineage ==
- Constituted as 4th Fighter Group (Single Engine) on 22 August 1942

Activated on 12 September 1942
Inactivated on 10 November 1945

- Activated on 9 September 1946

Redesignated: 4th Fighter Group, Jet Propelled on 23 April 1947
Redesignated: 4th Fighter Group, Jet on 14 June 1948
Redesignated: 4th Fighter-Interceptor Group on 20 January 1950
Redesignated: 4th Fighter-Bomber Group on 8 March 1955
Redesignated: 4th Fighter-Day Group on 25 April 1956
Inactivated on 8 December 1957

- Redesignated: 4th Tactical Fighter Group on 31 July 1985 (remained inactive)
- Redesignated: 4th Operations Group on 17 April 1991

Activated on 22 April 1991.

=== Assignments ===
- VIII Fighter Command, 12 September 1942
- 4th Air Defense Wing, 30 June 1943
- 65th Fighter Wing, 7 August 1943

Attached to: 2d Bombardment (later Air) Division, 15 September 1944 – November 1945

- Fifteenth Air Force, 9 September 1946
- Strategic Air Command, 31 March 1947
- 4th Fighter (later, 4th Fighter-Interceptor; 4th Fighter-Bomber; 4th Fighter-Day) Wing, 15 August 1947 – 8 December 1957
- 4th Wing (later, 4th Fighter Wing), 22 April 1991–present

=== Components ===
- 7th Fighter-Bomber Squadron: attached 15 April–October 1957
- 333d Fighter Squadron: 1 October 1994–present
- 334th Fighter (later, 334th Fighter-Interceptor; 334th Fighter-Bomber; 334th Fighter-Day; 334th Tactical Fighter; 334th Fighter) Squadron: 12 September 1942 – 10 November 1945; 9 September 1946 – 8 December 1957 (detached 1 May – 26 June 1951; 1 July – 8 December 1957); 22 April 1991–present
- 335th Fighter (later, 335th Fighter-Interceptor; 335th Fighter-Bomber; 335th Fighter-Day; 335th Tactical Fighter; 335th Fighter) Squadron: 12 September 1942 – 10 November 1945; 9 September 1946 – 8 December 1957 (detached 20 September – 3 November 1951; not operational 15 September – 8 December 1957); 22 April 1991–present
- 336th Fighter (later, 336th Fighter-Interceptor; 336th Fighter-Bomber; 336th Fighter-Day; 336th Tactical Fighter; 336th Fighter) Squadron: 12 September 1942 – 10 November 1945; 9 September 1946 – 8 December 1957 (detached 27 June – 19 September 1951; 19 November 1954 – 8 December 1957); 22 April 1991–present
- 339th Fighter-Interceptor Squadron: attached c. 25 November 1954 – 15 September 1957
- 344th Air Refueling Squadron: 22 April 1991 – 29 April 1994
- 711th Air Refueling Squadron: 29 April – 1 October 1994
- 744th Air Refueling Squadron: 29 April 1994 – 1 December 1995
- 911th Air Refueling Squadron: 22 April 1991 – 29 April 1994.

=== Stations ===
- RAF Bushey Hall (AAF-341), England, 12 September 1942
- RAF Debden (AAF-156), England, 29 September 1942
- RAF Steeple Morden (AAF-122), England, c. 23 July – 4 November 1945
- Camp Kilmer, New Jersey, 9–10 November 1945
- Selfridge Field, Michigan, 9 September 1946
- Andrews Field (later, AFB), Maryland, 26 March 1947
- Langley AFB, Virginia, 30 April 1949
- New Castle County Airport, Delaware, 14 August – 10 November 1950
- Johnson AB, Japan, 13 December 1950
- Suwon AB (K-13), South Korea, 30 March 1951
- Kimpo AB (K-14), South Korea, 23 August 1951
- Chitose Air Base, Japan, c. 25 November 1954 – 8 December 1957
- Seymour Johnson AFB, North Carolina, 22 April 1991–present

=== Aircraft ===
- Supermarine Spitfire, 1942–1943
- P-47 Thunderbolt, 1943–1944; 1947
- P-51 Mustang, 1944–1945; (later F-51), 1948–1949
- P-80 (later F-80) Shooting Star, 1947–1949
- F-86 Sabre, 1949–1957
- F-15E Strike Eagle, 1991–present
- KC-10 Extender, 1991–1995.

=== Awards ===
- Presidential Unit Citation
- France, 5 March 1944 – 24 April 1944
- Korea, 22 Apr 1951 – 8 July 1951
- Korea, 9 July 1951 – 27 November 1951
- Air Force Meritorious Unit Award
- 1 June 2008 – 30 April 2010
- Air Force Outstanding Unit Award
- 23 April 1991 – 31 March 1993
- 1 June 1998 – 31 May 2000
- 1 June 2000 – 31 May 2002
- 1 June 2002 – 31 May 2003
- Korean Presidential Unit Citation
- 1 November 1951 – 30 September 1952
- 1 October 1952 – 31 March 1953
- European Theatre of World War II
- Campaigns

Air Offensive Europe
Normandy
Northern France

Rhineland
Ardennes-Alsace
Central Europe

- Korean Service Medal
- Campaigns

Chinese Communist Forces Intervention
1st United Nations Counteroffensive
Chinese Communist Forces Spring Offensive
United Nations Summer-Fall Offensive

Second Korean Winter
Korea Summer-Fall 1952
Third Korean Winter
Korea Summer-Fall 1953

=== Emblems ===
RAF Eagle Squadron – World War II

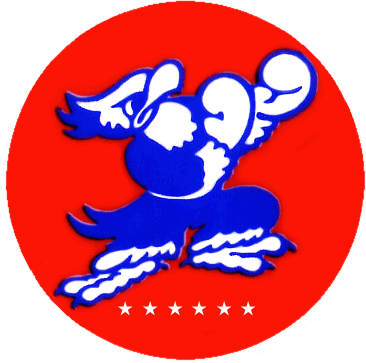
4th Fighter Group – World War II

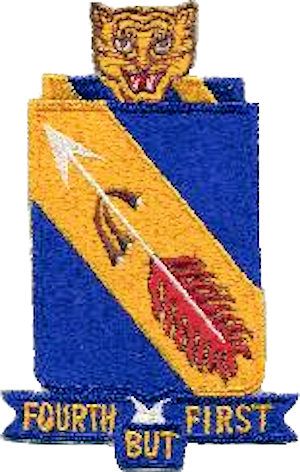
USAF 4th Fighter Group

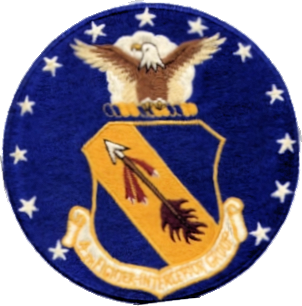
USAF 4th Fighter-Interceptor Group

== References and Bibliography ==
- Caine, Phillip D. (1995). Spitfires, Thunderbolts and Warm Beer: An American Fighter Pilot over Europe. Washington, DC: Brassy's (US). ISBN 9781574888447. (ISBN is for 2005 Potomac Books reprint)
- Davis, Larry (1978). MIG Alley: Air to Air Combat Over Korea. Squadron/Signal Publications. ISBN 9780897470810.
- Dunn, William R. (1982). Fighter Pilot: The First American Ace of World War II. Lexington, KY: University of Kentucky Press. ISBN 0-8131-1465-9.
- Endicott, Judy G., ed. (2001). The USAF in Korea, Campaigns, Units and Stations 1950-1953 (PDF). Maxwell AFB, AL: Air Force Historical Research Agency. ISBN 0-16-050901-7.
- Evans, Douglas K. (1986). Sabre Jets Over Korea: A First Hand Account. Blue Ridge Summit, PA: TAB Books. ISBN 9780830623525.
- Freeman, Roger A. (1993). The Mighty Eighth (reprint ed.). ISBN 978-0-87938-638-2.
- Fry, Gary L.; Rust, Kenn C. (1970). Debden Eagles: The 4th Fighter Group in World War II. Whittier, CA: Walker-Smith. ISBN 9780960037612.
- Fry, Gary L.; Ethell, Jeffrey L. (1980). Escort to Berlin: The 4th Fighter Group. New York, NY: Arco Publishing. ISBN 9780668050999.
- Gentile, Don S. (1944). One Man Air Force (As Told to Ira Wolfert). New York, NY: L.B. Fischer Publishing Corp.
- Godfrey, John T. (1958). The Look of Eagles. New York, NY: Random House.
- Goodson, James A. (1983). Tumult in the Clouds. New York, NY: St Martin's Press. ISBN 9780451211989.
- Hall, Grover C. (1944). Mr. Tettley's Tenants. London, UK: Baynard Press.
- Hall, Grover C. (1978) [1946]. 1,000 Destroyed: The Life and Times of the 4th Fighter Group (reprint ed.). Fallbrook, CA: Aero Publishers. ISBN 9780816850044.
- Maurer, Maurer, ed. (1982) [1969]. Combat Squadrons of the Air Force, World War II (PDF) (reprint ed.). Washington, DC: Office of Air Force History. ISBN 0-405-12194-6. Archived from the original (PDF) on 20 December 2016.
- Mueller, Robert (1989). Air Force Bases, Vol. I, Active Air Force Bases Within the United States of America on 17 September 1982 (PDF). Washington, DC: Office of Air Force History. ISBN 0-912799-53-6.
- Ravenstein, Charles A. (1984). Air Force Combat Wings, Lineage & Honors Histories 1947–1977. Washington, DC: Office of Air Force History. ISBN 0-912799-12-9.
- Spagnuolo, Mark M. (1986). Don S. Gentile: Soldier of God and Country. East Lansing, MI: College Press.
- Speer, Frank E. (1999) [1996]. The Debden Warbirds: The 4th Fighter Group in World War II (reprint ed.). Atglen, PA: Shiffer Publications. ISBN 9780764307256.
- Seymour Johnson AFB 4th Operations Group Factsheet
