= Steve Pisanos =

American World War II flying ace

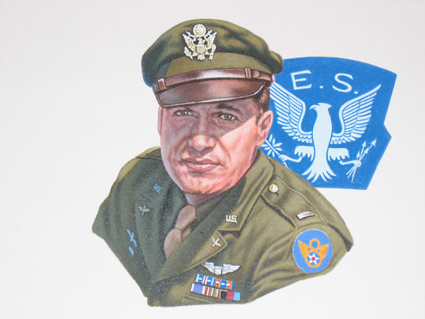
- Born: November 10, 1919; Metaxourgeio, Athens, Greece
- Died: June 6, 2016 (aged 96); Rancho Bernardo, California, U.S.
- Military career
- Allegiance: United Kingdom; United States
- Branch: Royal Air Force (1940–42); United States Army Air Forces (1942–47); United States Air Force (1947–74)
- Service years: 1940–1974
- Rank: Colonel
- Nickname: The Flying Greek
- Units: 4th Fighter Group; No. 71 Squadron RAF
- Conflicts: World War II; Vietnam War
- Awards: Legion of Merit (3); Distinguished Flying Cross (5); Purple Heart; Air Medal (11); Air Force Commendation Medal; Army Commendation Medal
- Other work: Author

Steven Nicholas Pisanos (born Spiros Pisanos (Greek: Σπύρος Πίσανος); November 10, 1919 – June 6, 2016) was a Greek-American aviator and flying ace who served as a fighter pilot with the British Royal Air Force (RAF) and later the United States Army Air Forces in World War II. He was credited with shooting down 10 enemy aircraft while flying with the American 4th Fighter Group. Post-war, he achieved the rank of colonel in the United States Air Force, flew in the Vietnam War and, by the end of his career in 1974, had received 33 decorations and distinctions. His autobiography, The Flying Greek, was published in April 2008.

== Early life ==
Pisanos was born in Metaxourgeio, Athens, Greece. The son of a railroad engineer, he was fascinated as a young boy by the sight of a Greek biplane maneuvering over his head in Kolonos and became obsessed by the wish to become a flyer. For the time being, he had to settle for frequent trips to a military aerodrome in the north of Athens, Dekelia (Tatoi), to watch the planes up close. Eventually, he became known to the personnel there who allowed him to wander in the hangars and sit in the planes. When he left school he searched for a chance to go to the United States where he knew he could take private flying lessons. In 1938 he was employed as a navy merchant seaman but at first chance he fled his ship to the docks of Baltimore and then to New York where he started working as a clandestine immigrant in US.

== Royal Air Force career ==
Starting with only a few dollars in his pocket he worked in a bakery, then as a tray boy in Plainfield, New Jersey, and spent most of his income for English and flying lessons, finally earning a private pilot's license in 1939. His popularity at work and at home enabled him to convert from an illegal alien to a lawful immigrant worker in the United States. For convenience people started calling him ‘Steve’ a short name that was later to replace his original Greek name.

After the war broke out and Greece was attacked in 1940, he tried to join the United States Army Air Forces but he was denied due to US neutrality. However, the Royal Air Force (RAF) was informally recruiting aviators in English-speaking countries; Britain, being an ally of Greece, accepted him. Candidates were evaluated in an airfield in California, where Pisanos was chosen as a pilot officer candidate for the RAF. After initial training in Canada and England, Pisanos joined the American-manned No. 71 Squadron RAF (an Eagle Squadron) while still a Greek citizen. He mainly flew the Spitfire Vb on low-level strafing attack missions over occupied Europe. He was again a very popular person and pilot within his group.

== United States Army Air Forces ==
Pisanos' lack of American citizenship prevented him from joining a purely American combat unit (i.e. one commanded by American officers). At the same time, the Greek government-in-exile was recruiting him for one of its new squadrons created in North Africa. Pisanos' comrades decided the solution was to convince the United States government to grant him citizenship under the name of 'Steve Pisanos', which it did on May 3, 1942, with the help of his commander, Squadron Leader Chesley G. Peterson. Pisanos became the first American citizen naturalized while on foreign soil.

When the United States entered World War II and started establishing air bases in England, the pilots in the three ‘Eagle Squadrons' were the only combat-experienced American pilots in Europe. A decision was made to integrate them into the US Army Air Forces. However, the pilots had developed strong links between them and preferred to stay in the same units with their present composition as pilots of the newly established 4th Fighter Group. Thus, Pisanos' unit, No. 71 Squadron RAF, became the 334th Fighter Squadron in September 1942.

In March 1943, the 4th Fighter Group started flying the new P-47 Thunderbolt fighter. As a member of the 334th Fighter Squadron, Pisanos' plane (P-47D-23-AAF Serial Number 42-7945) was coded QP-D and had an emblem of ‘Miss Plainfield’ painted on it as nose art He scored his first 2 confirmed victories over northeastern Belgium escorting US bombers while he had another 2 non-confirmed ones around the same time. He was soon promoted to the rank of Flight Lieutenant. He participated in more sorties in a variety of fighter tasks mainly over northwestern France, achieving another 4 confirmed kills against Messerschmitt Bf 109 and Focke Wulf Fw 190 fighters. Back in New Jersey people who knew him and heard the news of his successes prompted the local press to write an article. The title of the first one was 'The Flying Greek'. This title influenced him, and some 60 years later he named his book after it.

At the end of 1943, Pisanos had 6 confirmed and 2 probable air victories. In January 1944, the 4th Fighter Group received the new P-51 Mustang fighter. Pisanos' new plane (P-51B-7-NA, AAF Serial Number 43-6798) was also coded QP-D. On a mission over southern France on March 5, 1944, when the squadron escorted B-17 bombers to Bordeaux, he scored another 2 confirmed victories. On his return his engine began running rough, and he had to belly-land between Le Havre and Évreux in France. Although initially blamed on a spark plug malfunction, it is more likely due to use of 150-octane fuel. Once the USAAF switched to 100-octane fuel, problems with spark plug burn-out ceased. On this very mission, on the same day, Chuck Yeager was downed as well, near the Pyrenees, and was able to escape to Spain.

== In the French Resistance ==
Pisanos was helped by the French Resistance to hide from the Germans and was then given a false identity to pass as a distant family member to escape via Spain. Instead, he stayed in the French Resistance and was later moved to Paris. From there he established contact with agents of the OSS, collecting information about German traffic movement in the area, and participated in a number of local fights alongside the French until the liberation of Paris. Nearly all downed American pilots who evaded capture were returned home to the United States for fear of being recaptured by the Germans and succumbing to torture that could reveal the French helpers and their Resistance networks. After Pisanos was moved back to the US, he was given the task of flight-testing captured enemy aircraft to analyze their performance.

== Career in the United States Air Force ==
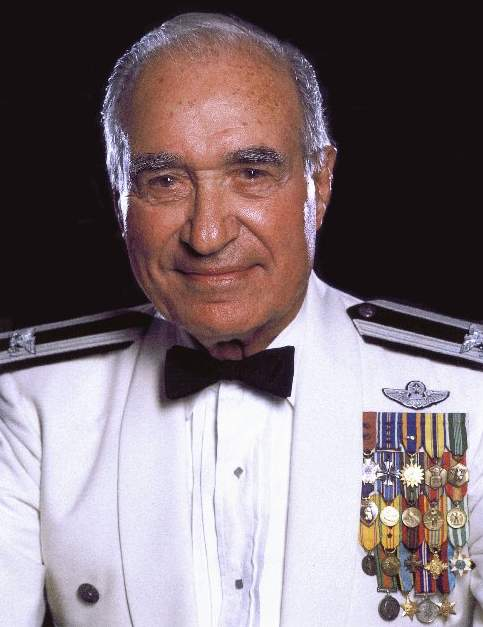
Pisanos in USAF mess uniform

After World War II, Pisanos flew the first operational United States jet fighter, the P-80 Shooting Star. After having a short career as a commercial pilot of 4-engined airliners with TWA, he returned to the United States Air Force due to his jet-flying experience as a captain. Pisanos attended the USAF Flight Performance School (now the U.S. Air Force Test Pilot School) and graduated with class 45D. Major Pisanos was tasked with testing advanced jet fighters, namely the F-102 Delta Dagger, with which he often flew at the supersonic speed of Mach 1.5 at an altitude of 50,000 feet. He continued serving with other units, testing new weapons development. He also served in Vietnam and near the end of his career as a Colonel, and a member of JUSMAAG, helped the Hellenic Air Force to integrate the F-4E Phantom II jet fighter. In 1974, he retired from the Air Force and lived in San Diego, California, with his wife Sofia.

== Retirement and death ==
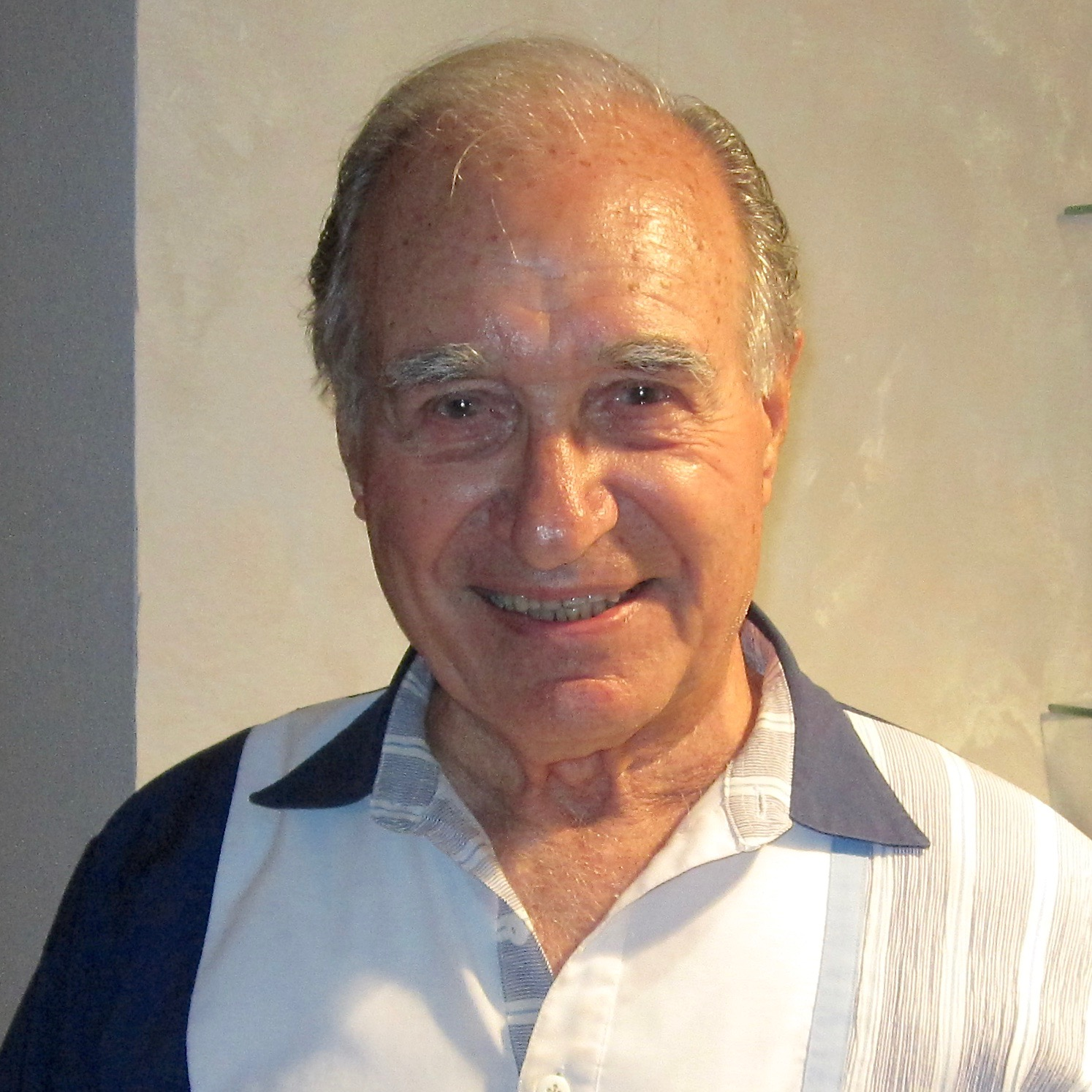
Pisanos in 2009

In 2008, Pisanos was inducted into the International Air & Space Hall of Fame at the San Diego Air & Space Museum. In 2010, Pisanos was awarded the French Legion of Honor, the French Republic's highest decoration, in a ceremony at the San Diego Air & Space Museum. The award, presented by the Consul General of France in Los Angeles, recognized Pisanos' outstanding achievements in World War II as a fighter pilot and in support of the French Resistance.

Pisanos died on June 6, 2016, from heart failure at his home in Rancho Bernardo, San Diego, California, aged 96. His wife Sofia predeceased him on 2012. He is buried alongside her at the Miramar National Cemetery in San Diego.
