= Ralph K. Hofer =

American military aviator (1921–1944)

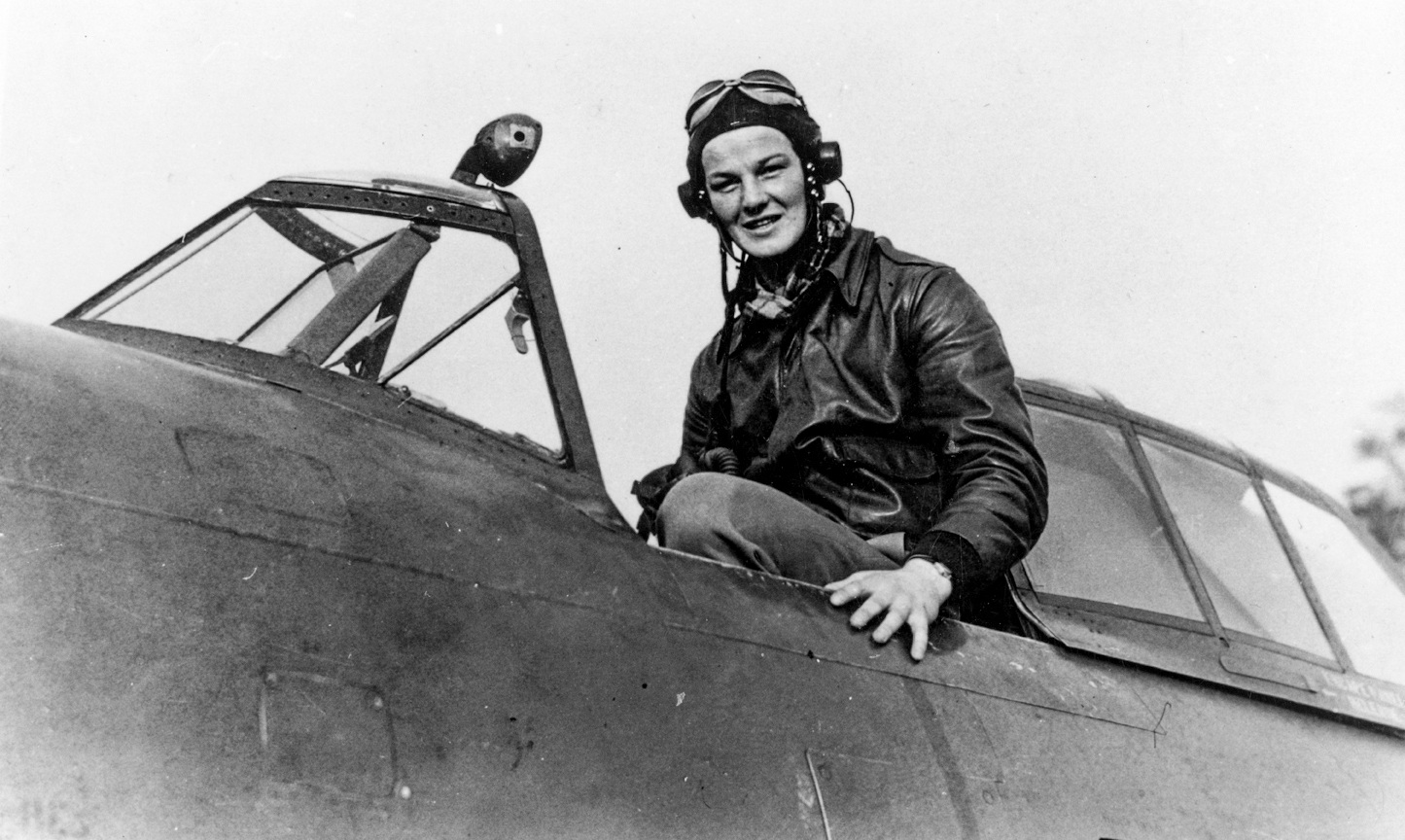
- Ralph Kidd Hofer in his P-47 Thunderbolt
- Born: June 22, 1921; Salem, Missouri, United States
- Died: July 2, 1944 (aged 23); Mostar, Yugoslavia
- Burial place: Jefferson Barracks National Cemetery
- Military career
- Allegiance: Canada; United States
- Branch: Royal Canadian Air Force (1941–43); United States Army Air Forces (1943–44)
- Service years: 1941–1944
- Rank: Lieutenant
- Nickname: "The Kidd"
- Unit: 4th Fighter Group
- Conflicts: World War II
- Awards: Distinguished Flying Cross (7); Air Medal (3)

Ralph Kidd Hofer (born Ralph Halbrook, June 22, 1921 – July 2, 1944) was an American fighter pilot and flying ace with the United States Army Air Forces in World War II.

== United States Army Air Forces ==
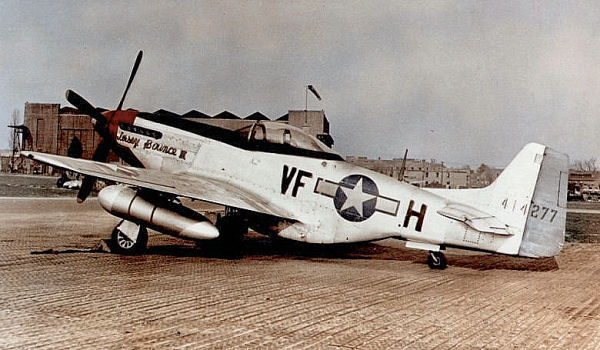
P-51 Mustang of the 4th Fighter Group, Debden Airfield, England

With his long hair and football jersey, "Kid" Hofer stands out as one of the most memorable characters in the Eighth Air Force. After serving in the Royal Canadian Air Force, Hofer transferred to the 4th Fighter Group in September 1943 and promptly destroyed a Bf 109 on his first mission. Hofer was known for not maintaining radio discipline, and incurred the wrath of group commander Colonel Don Blakeslee on more than one occasion. Hofer was also one of the top strafers in the Eighth Air Force with 14 confirmed enemy aircraft destroyed on the ground. He scored his first two victories in P-47s but is usually associated with P-51B 42-106924 QP—L, nicknamed Salem Representative.

== Death ==
On July 2, 1944, the 4th Fighter Group joined the 352nd and 325th Fighter Groups in a bomber escort mission to Budapest, Hungary, flying from bases in Foggia, Italy. Over the Budapest area, they encountered a force of Bf 109s. A tough battle followed. In all, four P-51s were shot down on the mission. Of the four downed pilots, two were made prisoners of war, and two were killed. The last was Hofer. Luftwaffe records show he was brought down by anti-aircraft fire (flak) while strafing a German fighter base at Mostar Sud airfield in then-Yugoslavia (now Bosnia-Herzegovina) some 500 kilometers away from the aerial battle . His body was recovered from the wreckage of P-51B, QP-X and the Red Cross ultimately notified Hofer's unit. Hofer is buried in a mass grave at Jefferson Barracks National Cemetery in St. Louis, Missouri.

== Decorations ==
Among Hofer's decorations are the Distinguished Flying Cross with six oak leaf clusters and three Air Medals.

Army Air Forces Pilot Badge

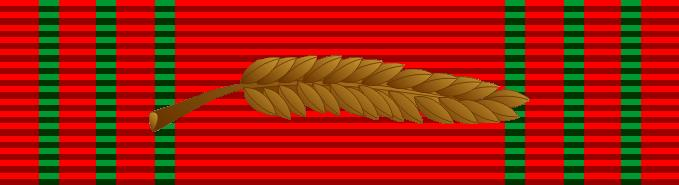
Distinguished Flying Cross with silver and bronze oak leaf clusters
Purple Heart
Air Medal with three bronze oak leaf clusters
Presidential Unit Citation
American Campaign Medal
European-African-Middle Eastern Campaign Medal with three bronze campaign stars
World War II Victory Medal
Croix de Guerre, with Palm (Belgium)
Canadian Volunteer Overseas Service Medal
