= Everett W. Stewart =

American flying ace (1915–1982)

Everett Wilson Stewart
- Born: July 18, 1915; Talmage, Kansas, U.S.
- Died: February 10, 1982 (aged 66); San Antonio, Texas, U.S.
- Burial place: Restland Memorial Park; Dallas, Texas
- Military career
- Allegiance: United States
- Branch: United States Army Air Corps; United States Army Air Forces; United States Air Force
- Service years: 1938–1966
- Rank: Colonel
- Nicknames: “Ev” ”Stew”
- Commands: 30th Air Division; 4th Fighter Group; 355th Fighter Group; 328th Fighter Squadron
- Conflicts: World War II
- Awards: Silver Star; Legion of Merit; Distinguished Flying Cross (4); Air Medal (10)

Everett Wilson Stewart (July 18, 1915 – February 10, 1982) was an American flying ace of World War II with the shootdown of seven enemy aircraft in the air while flying a P-47 Thunderbolt with the 355th Fighter Group, and two shared victories while flying a P-47 Thunderbolt with the 352nd Fighter Group. In some sources, this is described as "7.83 aerial victories".

== Early life ==
Stewart was born on July 18, 1915, in Talmage, Kansas. He was commissioned a 2nd lieutenant through the Army ROTC program at Kansas State University on May 30, 1938, and then enlisted in the Aviation Cadet Program of the U.S. Army Air Corps on June 23, 1938.

== Military career ==
=== World War II ===
Stewart completed pilot training, was commissioned a 2nd lieutenant in the Army Air Corps, and was awarded his pilot wings on May 26, 1939.

His first assignment was flying P-40 Warhawk and P-39 Airacobra fighters with the 79th Pursuit Squadron of the 20th Pursuit Group at Moffett Field and Hamilton Field in California, from June 1939 to February 1941, followed by service in Hawaii and on Midway Islands until September 1942. He quickly rose to the rank of squadron commander.

After the Battle of Midway, he was given command of the 328th Fighter Squadron of the 352nd Fighter Group, which was sent to England in mid-1943. Flying the P-47 Thunderbolt, he was credited with the shared destruction of two enemy aircraft in aerial combat plus 1 damaged.

In January 1944, he was transferred to the 355th Fighter Group. He became the group's commanding officer in November 1944 to February 1945. During this time, Stewart destroyed 7 enemy aircraft in the air with 1 probable and 2 damaged, while flying the P-51 Mustangs.

He was promoted to colonel in January 1945 and given command of the famous 4th Fighter Group from February 1945 to the end of the war. While in command of 4th FG, he was credited in damaging a jet powered Me 262 in March 1945. An aircraft he flew at this time was an unusually modified P-51D, fitted with radar and a second seat to accommodate the radar operator.

After his serving with 4th Fighter Group, he was assigned to the Occupation duty at Headquarters U.S. Air Forces in Europe at Wiesbaden, Germany, from September 1945 to March 1946.

During World War II, Stewart was credited with the destruction of 7.83 enemy aircraft in aerial combat, 1 probable, 4 damaged, and 1.5 on the ground while strafing enemy airfields.

=== Post war ===
Stewart served as an Operations and Training Staff Officer at Maxwell Field, from May to December 1946, and then at Tyndall Field, from December 1946 to August 1947. After completing Air Command and Staff School at Maxwell Air Force Base, Stewart served as an instructor and director with the Air Tactical School at Tyndall Air Force Base, from June 1948 to October 1950, followed by service as a director at Air Command and Staff School at Maxwell Air Force Base from October 1950 to July 1951.

He attended Air War College from July 1951 to June 1952, and then served with Headquarters U.S. Air Force in the Pentagon until August 1953. His next assignment was on the Joint Intelligence Group in the Office of the Joint Chiefs of Staff in the Pentagon from August 1953 to August 1956, followed by National Defense College in Canada from September 1956 to July 1957.

Stewart was Vice Commander of the 30th Air Division at Willow Run Air Force Station, from August 1957 to January 1959, Deputy for Operations for the 37th Air Division and then the 30th Air Division at Truax Field, from January 1959 to May 1960, and then Vice Commander of the 30th Air Division, also at Truax Field, from May to October 1960.

He served on the staff with Supreme Headquarters Allied Powers Europe at Louveciennes, France, from October 1960 to September 1962, and then served as Senior Air Force Advisor to the 136th Air Defense Wing at USNAS Dallas, from October 1962 to October 1964. His final assignment was at McConnell Air Force Base.

Stewart retired from the Air Force on February 1, 1966.

== Later life ==
Stewart died of a heart condition on February 10, 1982, and is buried at Restland Memorial Park in Dallas, Texas.

== Aerial victory credits ==
Date	#	Type	Location	Aircraft flown	Unit Assigned
March 6, 1944	1	Bf 109	Hanover, Germany	P-51B Mustang	355 FG Hq
March 16, 1944	1	Bf 109	Augsburg, Germany	P-51B	355 FG Hq
March 18, 1944	1	Bf 109	Munich, Germany	P-51B	355 FG Hq
March 29, 1944	2	Focke-Wulf Fw 190	Goslar, Germany	P-51B	355 FG Hq
April 11, 1944	1	Junkers Ju 188	Aschau, Germany	P-51B	355 FG Hq
April 11, 1944	1	Me 410	Pyritz, Germany	P-51B	355 FG Hq

SOURCES: Air Force Historical Study 85: USAF Credits for the Destruction of Enemy Aircraft, World War II

== Awards ==
During his lengthy career, Stewart earned many decorations, including:

USAF Command Pilot Badge
Silver Star		Legion of Merit
Distinguished Flying Cross w/ 3 bronze oak leaf clusters	Air Medal w/ 1 silver and 3 bronze oak leaf clusters	Air Medal (second ribbon required for accouterment spacing)
Presidential Unit Citation	Air Force Outstanding Unit Award	American Campaign Medal
American Defense Service Medal w/ 1 bronze service star	Asiatic-Pacific Campaign Medal w/ 1 bronze campaign star	European-African-Middle Eastern Campaign Medal w/ 1 silver and 1 bronze campaign stars
World War II Victory Medal	Army of Occupation Medal w/ 'Germany' clasp	National Defense Service Medal w/ 1 bronze service star
Air Force Longevity Service Award w/ 1 silver oak leaf cluster	Croix de Guerre with Palm (France)	Distinguished Flying Cross (United Kingdom)
