= Donald Blakeslee =

United States Air Force officer (1917–2008)

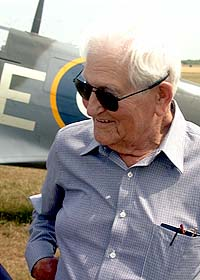
- Born: September 11, 1917; Fairport Harbor, Ohio, U.S.
- Died: September 3, 2008 (aged 90); Miami, Florida, U.S.
- Burial place: Arlington National Cemetery
- Military career
- Allegiance: United States; Canada
- Branch: United States Army Reserve (1938–40); Royal Canadian Air Force (1941–42); United States Army Air Forces (1942–47); United States Air Force (1947–65)
- Service years: 1938–1965
- Rank: Colonel
- Unit: No. 401 Squadron RCAF
- Commands: 4440th Aircraft Delivery Group; 27th Fighter-Escort Group; 4th Fighter Group; 335th Fighter Squadron; No. 133 (Eagle) Squadron RAF
- Conflicts: World War II; Korean War
- Awards: Distinguished Service Cross (2); Silver Star (2); Legion of Merit; Distinguished Flying Cross (8); Air Medal (8); Distinguished Flying Cross (United Kingdom)

Donald James Matthew Blakeslee (September 11, 1917 – September 3, 2008) was an American pilot and officer in the United States Air Force, whose aviation career began as a pilot in the Royal Canadian Air Force flying Spitfire fighter aircraft during World War II. He then became a member of the Royal Air Force Eagle Squadrons, before transferring to the United States Army Air Forces in 1942. He flew more combat missions against the Luftwaffe than any other American fighter pilot, and by the end of the war was a flying ace credited with 15.5 aerial victories.

== Early life ==
Blakeslee was born in Fairport Harbor, Ohio on September 11, 1917, and became interested in flying after watching the Cleveland Air Races as a young boy. With money saved from his job with the Diamond Alkali Company, he and a friend purchased a Piper J-3 in the mid-1930s, flying it from Willoughby Field, Ohio. However, his friend crashed the plane in 1940, and Blakeslee decided the best way to remain flying was to join the Royal Canadian Air Force (RCAF).

== Military career ==
=== World War II ===
==== RCAF and Eagle Squadrons ====
After training in Canada, Blakeslee arrived in England on May 15, 1941, where he was assigned to No. 401 Squadron RCAF. The squadron was assigned to the Biggin Hill Wing. Flying sweeps over France, Pilot Officer Blakeslee seems to have first seen combat on November 18, 1941, when he damaged a Bf 109 near Le Touquet; and he claimed his first kill on November 22, 1941, a Bf 109 destroyed, over Desvres, about 10 miles south of Marck; on the same mission, he damaged a further Bf 109 whilst returning to base. His next kills were not claimed until April 28, 1942, two Fw 190 probably destroyed. He proved to be not a particularly good shot, but was receptive to the principles involved in air fighting tactics, and was soon shown to be a gifted leader, in the air and on the ground.

By the summer of 1942 he was an acting flight lieutenant, and was awarded the British Distinguished Flying Cross on August 14, 1942. The citation read:

Acting Flight Lieutenant Donald James Mathew BLAKESLEE (Can.J/4551) Royal Canadian Air Force No. 133 (Eagle) Squadron. This officer has completed a large number of sorties over enemy territory. He has destroyed 1, probably destroyed 2 and damaged several more hostile aircraft. He is a fine leader whose keenness has proved most inspiring.

He then completed his first tour of duty, clocking 200 combat hours with three victories.

Blakeslee had studiously avoided being part of the American volunteer Eagle Squadrons, claiming "they played sister in making their claims." But when told he would be assigned to be an instructor pilot, he finally volunteered to be sent to No. 133 (Eagle) Squadron RAF as its commanding officer, which was the only way he could remain on combat status. During the raid against Dieppe, France on August 18, 1942, Blakeslee shot down a further Fw 190, and another probably destroyed on the 19th, thus achieving ace status.

==== 4th Fighter Group ====
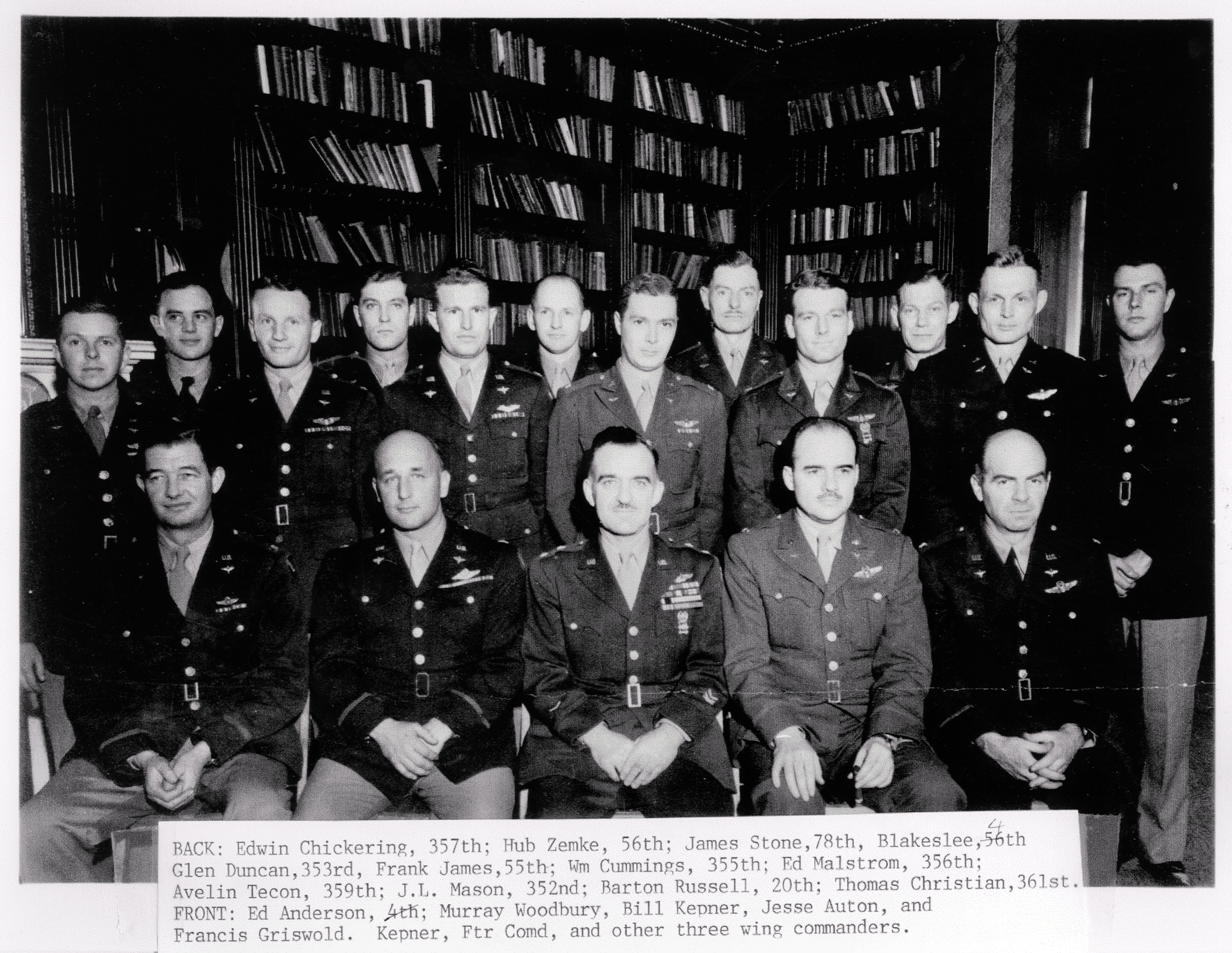
Commanding officers of the Fighter Groups of the 8th Air Force in 1944; Blakeslee is fourth from the left in the back row.

On September 12, 1942, the 71, 121, and 133 Squadrons were "activated" as the USAAF's 4th Fighter Group, operating from a former RAF field at Debden. After a few months flying Spitfires, the group was re-equipped with the new Republic P-47 Thunderbolt. On April 15, 1943, Blakeslee claimed an Fw 190 for the group's first P-47 "kill", and claimed a further Fw 190 on May 14, 1943, both near Knocke. Leading the 335th Squadron of the 4th FG, Blakeslee flew the group into Germany for the first time on July 28. Towards the end of the year, Blakeslee led the group more often, and developed a tactic of circling above any air battle and directing his fighters as necessary.

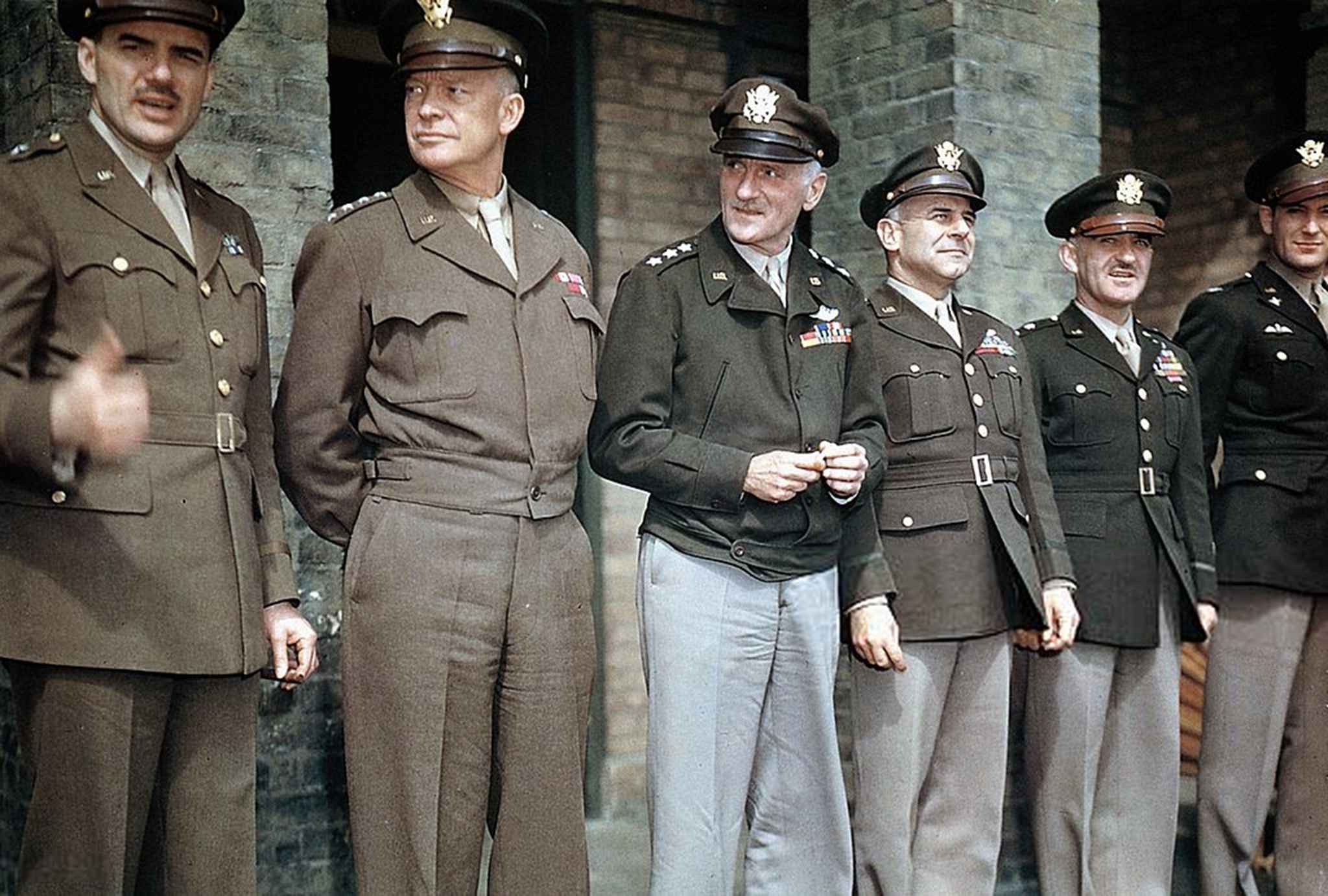
Generals Jesse D. Auton; Dwight Eisenhower; Carl Spaatz; Jimmy Doolittle; William Kepner and Colonel Blakeslee in April 1944.

Blakeslee flew the P-51 Mustang for the first time in December 1943 and thereafter worked hard to have the 4th FG re-equipped as soon as possible with the new fighter, pushing hard, especially as he now became commanding officer of the 4th on January 1, 1944. The 8th Air Force Command eventually agreed to the request, provided the pilots were operational on the P-51 within 24 hours of receiving them. Blakeslee agreed, instructing his pilots to "learn how to fly them on the way to the target".

On March 6, 1944, Blakeslee flew in the first Mustang over Berlin while defending Boeing B-17s and Consolidated B-24s. Escorting the massed daylight raids of the 8th Air Force over Occupied Europe while under Blakeslee's command, the 4th FG became one of the highest-scoring groups of VIII Fighter Command. The 4th's aggressive style was very effective, and the 4th Fighter Group passed the 500-kill mark at the end of April 1944. At the end of the war, the group had destroyed 1,020 German planes (550 in flight, and 470 on the ground).

In one of these escort missions, 10 miles South of Augsburg, Blakeslee's official claim of an ME-109 on March 18 went as follows: "We had made R/V [rendezvous] with the bombers at 1425 in the vicinity of Augsburg. The bombers were flying at 23 to 25,000 and we were at 27,000. As we made R/V we saw a large gaggle of S.E. E/A [single engine enemy aircraft] approaching the bombers on a parallel course about a thousand feet above them. We dove to intercept but in my dive I lost sight of the main group of E/A but saw about 8 FW-190’s 3000 feet below at about 9 o’clock and same level to the bombers. I and my No. 2, Capt. Gentile of 336 Squadron continued in our dive to intercept these. As we approached them the 8 A/C split with 4 diving line abreast, so we followed them to the deck, closing to 50 yards before opening fire. I took the #3 E/AC and Capt Gentile took the #4. The E/AC attempted to evade by running away and when they turned they swung into line astern. When I finally closed to within 200 yards of the #3 A/C I saw strikes all along the tail, fuselage, cockpit and engine. The cockpit hood fell off and the engine started to smoke and burn and the left under carriage fell down. I pulled up when 150 yards from the E/A and did not see him go in but Capt Gentile saw him hit the ground. I saw a parachute open up after I had gained altitude but I am not sure if it came from the A/C I had shot down or the one Capt Gentile destroyed. The #1 and #2 E/A apparently ran away during the combat with the #3 and 4. Most of our firing took place at tree top level. I claim one FW-190 as destroyed."

The next landmark for Blakeslee was leading the first "shuttle" mission to Russia on June 21, 1944, flying 1,470 miles in a mission lasting over 7 hours.

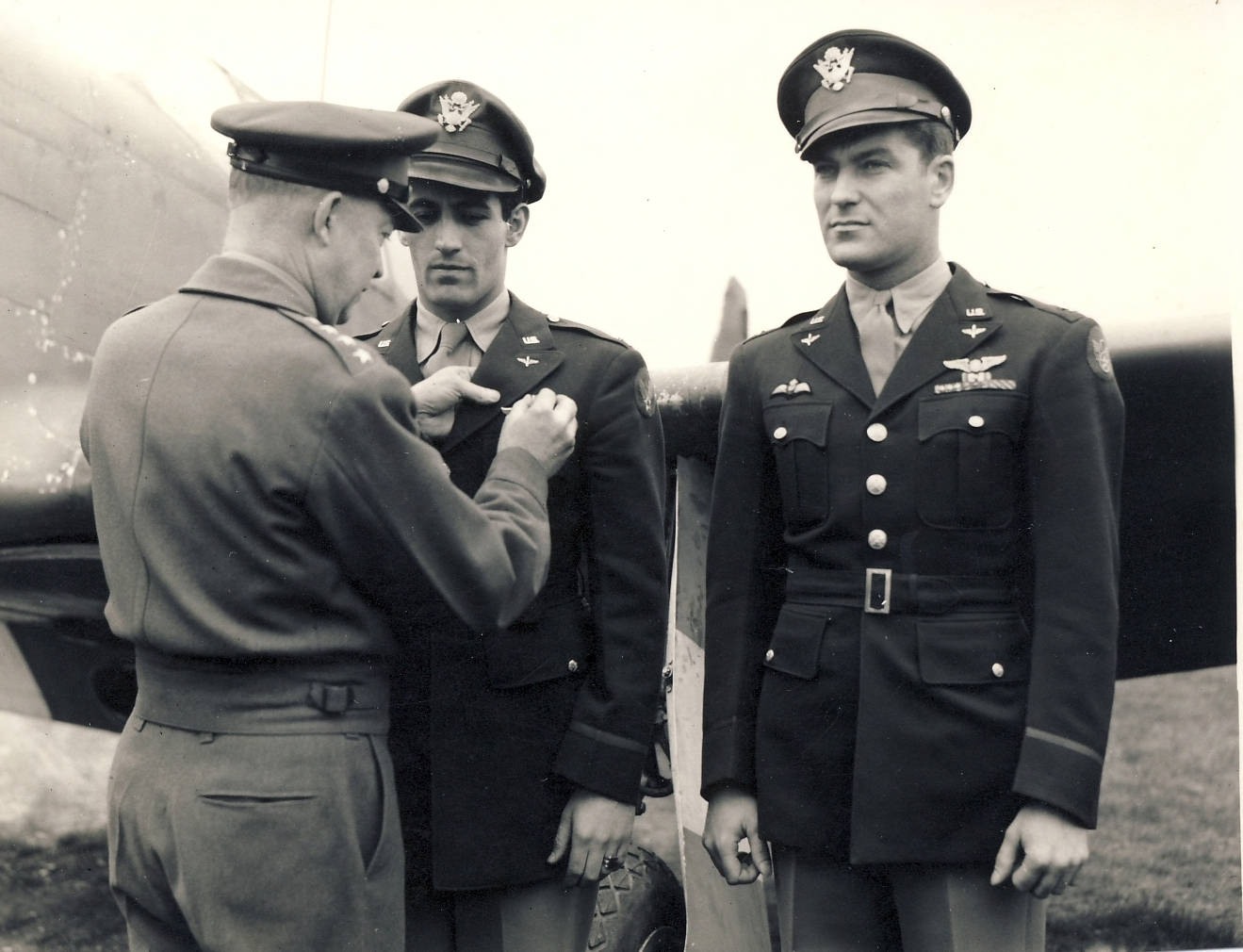
General Dwight D. Eisenhower awards the Distinguished Service Cross to Don Gentile (left) and Colonel Donald Blakeslee on April 11, 1944.

Don Blakeslee was finally grounded in September 1944, after the loss of several high-scoring USAAF aces. He had accounted for 15.5 kills in the air and 2 more on the ground. He had flown over 500 operational sorties and accumulated 1,000 combat hours. Barrett Tillman, who served as an executive secretary of the American Fighter Aces Association, stated that Blakeslee had more missions and hours "than any other American fighter pilot of World War II". Blakeslee retired from the United States Air Force in 1965 with the rank of colonel. An obituary in The Guardian further described him as: "the most decorated second world war US Army Air Force fighter pilot."

Blakeslee's personal standing among Allied pilots was considerable. British ace Johnnie Johnson described him as "one of the best leaders ever to fight over Germany".

=== Post war ===
Following the end of World War II, Blakeslee continued to serve in the newly created U.S. Air Force. During the Korean War, he served as commander of the 27th Fighter-Escort Group at Taegu Air Base in South Korea and Itazuke Air Base in Japan, and flew several missions in the F-84 Thunderjet from December 1950 to March 1951. In March 1963, he was promoted to colonel and his final assignment was as Special Assistant to the Director of Operations for Seventeenth Air Force, from December 1964 until he retired from the Air Force on April 30, 1965.

== Awards and honors ==
His awards include:

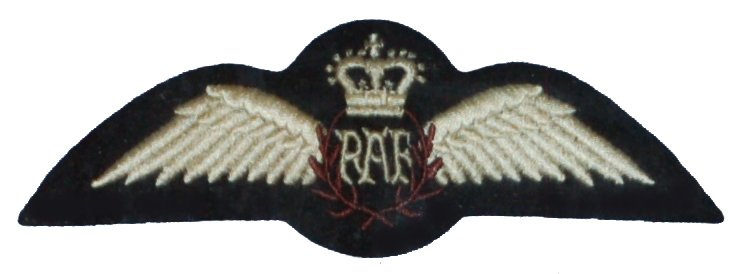
United States Air Force Command pilot badge
Royal Air Force pilot brevet
Distinguished Service Cross with bronze oak leaf cluster
Silver Star with bronze oak leaf cluster
Legion of Merit
Distinguished Flying Cross with one silver and two bronze oak leaf clusters
Air Medal with one silver and two bronze oak leaf clusters
Air Force Presidential Unit Citation with two bronze oak leaf clusters
American Campaign Medal
European-African-Middle Eastern Campaign Medal with silver campaign star
World War II Victory Medal
Army of Occupation Medal
National Defense Service Medal with one bronze service star
Korean Service Medal with four bronze campaign stars
Air Force Longevity Service Award with silver oak leaf cluster
British Distinguished Flying Cross
French Croix de Guerre with Palm
Republic of Korea Presidential Unit Citation
Canadian Volunteer Overseas Service Medal
United Nations Service Medal for Korea
Korean War Service Medal

=== 1st Distinguished Service Cross citation ===

Blakeslee, Donald J.M.
Colonel (Air Corps), U.S. Army Air Forces
4th Fighter Group, 8th Air Force
Date of Action: January 7, 1944

Citation:

The President of the United States of America, authorized by Act of Congress July 9, 1918, takes pleasure in presenting the Distinguished Service Cross to Colonel (Air Corps) Donald James Mathew Blakeslee, United States Army Air Forces, for extraordinary heroism in connection with military operations against an armed enemy while serving as Pilot of a P-51 Fighter Airplane in the 4th Fighter Group, Eighth Air Force, in aerial combat against enemy forces in the vicinity of Headin, France. Colonel Blakeslee, on 7 January 1944, after engaging a flight of six enemy aircraft intent on the destruction of crippled and straggling heavy bombers, observed ten to twelve FW-190's attacking unescorted bombers which were above him. Though attacked by three enemy aircraft from astern and flying into heavy and accurate fire which struck and damaged his aircraft, Colonel Blakeslee, disregarding damage, unfavorable altitude, obscured vision from spraying oil, and enemy superiority, climbed into the mass of enemy aircraft which he attacked and scattered, pursuing one of them through the haze to 2,000 feet, where he destroyed it before escape could be accomplished. Colonel Blakeslee's courage, aggressiveness, and will to destroy the enemy in the face of overwhelming odds reflect the greatest credit upon himself and the Armed Forces of the United States.

=== 2nd Distinguished Service Cross citation ===

Blakeslee, Donald J.M.
Colonel (Air Corps), U.S. Army Air Forces
4th Fighter Group, 8th Air Force
Date of Action: June 21, 1944 to July 5, 1944

Citation:

The President of the United States of America, authorized by Act of Congress July 9, 1918, takes pleasure in presenting a Bronze Oak Leaf Cluster in lieu of a Second Award of the Distinguished Service Cross to Colonel (Air Corps) Donald James Mathew Blakeslee, United States Army Air Forces, for extraordinary heroism in connection with military operations against an armed enemy while serving as Pilot of a P-51 Fighter Airplane in the 4th Fighter Group, Eighth Air Force, in aerial combat against enemy forces during the period from 21 June 1944 to 5 July 1944. During this period Colonel Blakeslee led a fighter escort in protection of bombers on the longest escort mission in fighter plane history, the first shuttle mission from England to Russia and return by way of Italy. On this unprecedented mission Colonel Blakeslee overcame the obstacles of poor navigational facilities, adverse weather, and enemy fighter opposition in such a manner that no bombers were lost while being escorted. While sweeping in front of the oncoming bombers on the mission over Budapest on 2 July 1944, he observed 50 enemy single-engine aircraft above him and about to attack the bombers. He immediately led his flight of four aircraft to attack, disregarding all odds and disadvantage of altitude. Joined later by his quadroon's two other flights, the enemy attack was completely disrupted and ten of his aircraft destroyed- -Colonel Blakeslee personally destroying one of them. His courageous leadership and heroic action on this occasion reflect the highest credit upon himself and the Armed Forces of the United States.

== Personal life and death ==
After retiring, Blakeslee lived in Miami, Florida. Blakeslee married Leola Fryer (died in 2005) in 1944 and had one daughter. Blakeslee died on September 3, 2008, at his home due to heart failure.

On Friday September 18, 2008, Colonel Don Blakeslee and his wife's ashes were interred at Arlington National Cemetery. The ceremony took place at 1100 hours and was open to the public. The 4th Fighter Wing also did a flyover at the ceremony.

== See also ==
- List of World War II air aces
