= Chesley G. Peterson =

United States Air Force general

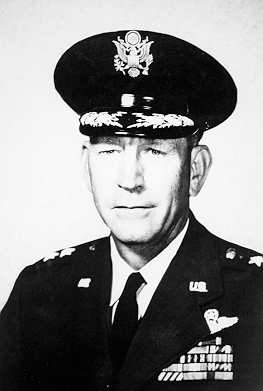
- Major General Chesley G. Peterson
- Born: Chesley Gordon Peterson; August 10, 1920; Salmon, Idaho, U.S.
- Died: January 28, 1990 (aged 69); Riverside, California, U.S.
- Military career
- Allegiance: United Kingdom; United States
- Branch: Royal Air Force; United States Army Air Forces; United States Air Force
- Service years: 1937–1939; 1940–1970
- Rank: Major General
- Nickname: Pete
- Commands: 8th Tactical Fighter Wing; 48th Fighter Bomber Wing; 137th Fighter Bomber Group; 4th Fighter Group; No. 71 Squadron RAF
- Conflicts: World War II
- Awards: Distinguished Service Cross; Legion of Merit (2); Purple Heart; Air Medal (3); Distinguished Service Order (United Kingdom); Distinguished Flying Cross (United Kingdom); Legion of Honor (France)

Major General Chesley G. Peterson (August 10, 1920 – January 28, 1990) was a career officer in the United States Air Force, and a flying ace of the United States Army Air Forces (USAAF) in World War II. As a fighter pilot in the European theater, he is best known for his time as the commander of the famous 4th Fighter Group during 1942–1943. At 23, he was the youngest colonel in the USAAF.

== Early years ==
Peterson was born in Idaho, but moved to Utah in his childhood. He graduated from Payson High School and then earned a B.A. degree in political science at Brigham Young University. Peterson joined the Utah National Guard in 1937. In 1939, he joined the Army Air Corps and was selected for air cadet training, but was dismissed before graduation from flight school. He moved to Los Angeles after being dropped from flight school and was working at Douglas Aircraft when he became interested in flying for the Royal Air Force (RAF), who were at that time recruiting Americans to fight the Germans.

== World War II ==
=== Eagle Squadron ===
Peterson arrived in England in late 1940 and was assigned to No. 71 Squadron of the Royal Air Force (RAF). No. 71 Squadron was one of the three Eagle Squadrons, made up of volunteer American pilots who served in World War II prior to the United States entering the war. The Americans would fly Hurricanes and Spitfires against the Luftwaffe. In time, he was promoted to flight lieutenant, and given command of No. 71 Squadron. Flight Lieutenant Peterson completed 42 missions while flying with the RAF. When he was given command of No. 71 Squadron, he was only 21 years old and the youngest squadron commander in the RAF.

However, he was not, as sometimes claimed, one of the Few.

=== 4th Fighter Group ===
In 1942, Peterson accepted a transfer to the United States Army Air Forces (USAAF) along with the rest of the Eagle Squadron members. He was assigned to the 4th Fighter Group as the executive officer and as a major. Later he would be promoted to colonel at the age of 23, and became the youngest colonel in the USAAF.

When Peterson first joined the 4th Fighter Group, they were assigned the P-47 Thunderbolt, which was a radical change from the Spitfires the Eagle Squadron pilots had flown. While flying a P-47 over the English Channel, Peterson was forced to bail out at 500 feet (150 m) above the water. His parachute failed, but miraculously Peterson survived both the fall and the dangerous Channel waters.

In January 1944, Peterson was reassigned to VIII Fighter Command as a staff officer and then to a subordinate unit of VIII Fighter Command, the 65th Fighter Wing, until returning to the United States at the end of 1944. During his time overseas, Colonel Peterson flew a total of 130 missions and was credited with nine aerial victories and nine probables.

After attending Command and General Staff School at Fort Leavenworth, Kansas, Peterson was assigned as the commander of Dale Mabry Field, Tallahassee, Florida in March 1945. His next assignment was as chief, Air Attaché Branch, Headquarters Army Air Forces, Washington, D.C., beginning in August, 1945.

== Post-war Air Force career ==
After the war, Colonel Peterson had a variety of assignments including command and staff assignments. From 1946 to 1949, he served as a military attaché in South Africa. Despite not participating directly in either the Korean or Vietnam wars, Peterson was assigned overseas as the commander of flying units in France and Japan during both wars. He graduated from the Air War College in 1959.

Peterson was promoted to major general in 1965. His last assignment on active duty began on April 1, 1967, as the Assistant Chief of Staff for Intelligence, Staff, Commander in Chief, Pacific. Peterson retired July 31, 1970. He died on January 28, 1990, in Riverside, California, and is buried at Riverside National Cemetery.

== Awards and decorations ==
USAF Command Pilot Badge
Distinguished Service Cross
Legion of Merit with bronze oak leaf cluster
Purple Heart
Air Medal with two bronze oak leaf clusters
American Campaign Medal
European-African-Middle Eastern Campaign Medal with three bronze campaign stars
World War II Victory Medal
National Defense Service Medal with service star
Air Force Longevity Service Award with one silver and two bronze oak leaf clusters
Distinguished Service Order (United Kingdom)
Distinguished Flying Cross (United Kingdom)
Chevalier of the Legion of Honour (France)
1939–1945 Star (United Kingdom)

=== Distinguished Service Cross citation ===

Peterson, Chesley.
Lieutenant Colonel (Air Corps), U.S. Army Air Forces
Date of Action: May 1943

Citation:

The President of the United States of America, authorized by Act of Congress, July 9, 1918, takes pleasure in presenting the Distinguished Service Cross to Lieutenant Colonel (Air Corps) Chesley Gordon Peterson, United States Army Air Forces, for extraordinary heroism in connection with military operations against an armed enemy while serving as Pilot of a P-47 Fighter Airplane and Commanding Officer of the 4th Fighter Group, Eighth Air Force, in aerial combat against enemy forces in May 1943. While leading a formation in escort of bombardment aircraft and after his wing man had dropped behind due to motor trouble, Colonel Peterson sighted eight enemy airplanes about to attack the bomber formation. With utter disregard for his personal safety and without assistance he immediately engaged the eight enemy aircraft, probably destroying one and damaging another. The vigor and fearlessness of his attack completely disrupted the enemy formation and routed the enemy attack, thereby contributing largely to the safety of the bomber aircraft and the successful completion of their mission.
