= Edward W. Anderson =

United States Air Force general (1903–1979)

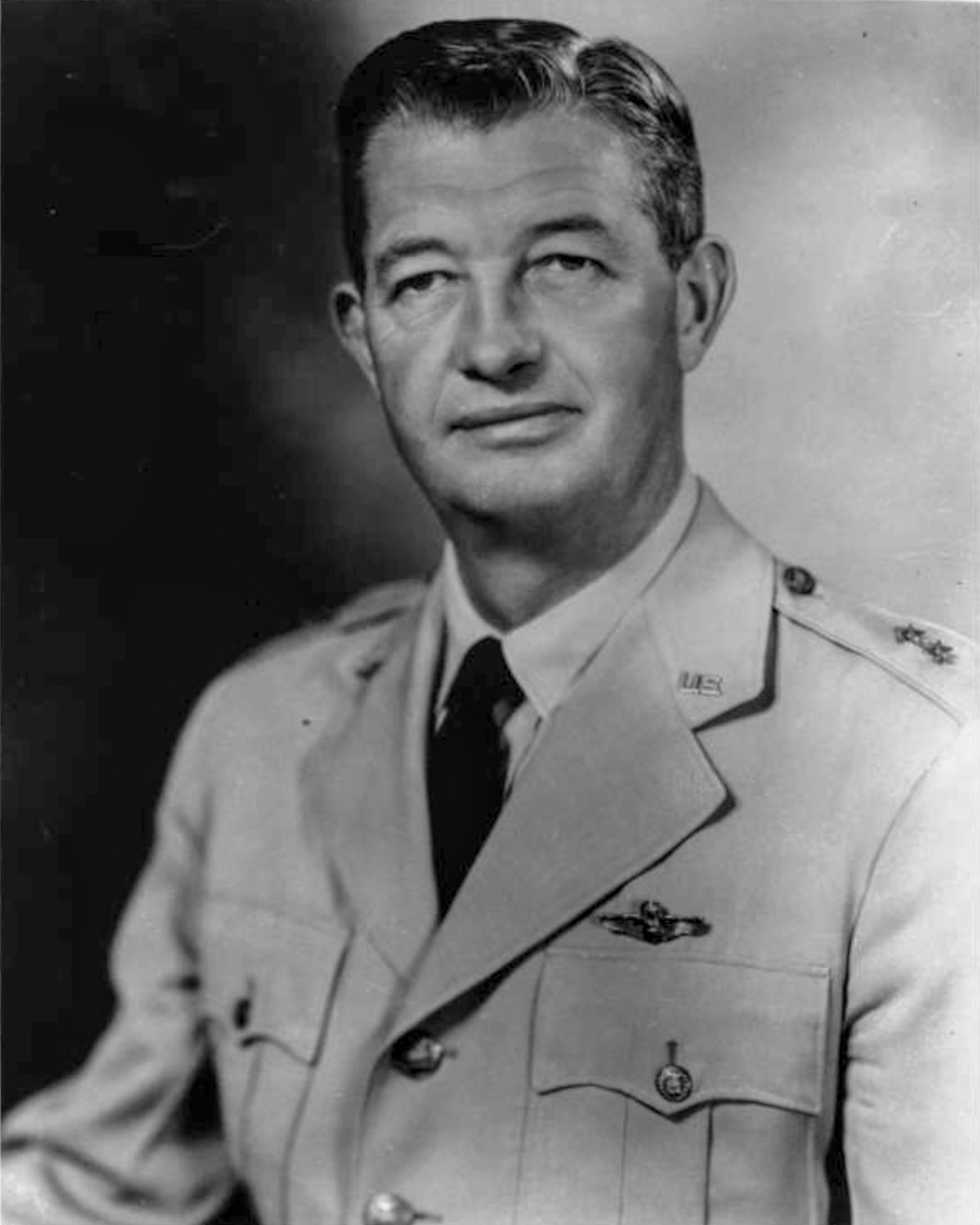
- Major General Edward W Anderson
- Born: September 23, 1903; Manhattan, Kansas, U.S.
- Died: April 12, 1979 (aged 75); San Bernardino County, California, U.S.
- Military career
- Allegiance: United States of America
- Branch: United States Air Force; United States Army Air Forces; United States Army Air Corps
- Service years: 1928–1958
- Rank: Major General
- Units: 20th Fighter Group; 4th Fighter Group; 65th Fighter Wing
- Commands: Air Force Technical Training School; 59th Air Depot Wing, Burtonwood; San Bernardino Air Materiel Area
- Conflicts: World War II
- Awards: Distinguished Service Medal; Silver Star; Legion of Merit (2); Bronze Star; Air Medal (3); American Theater Medal; American Defense Service Medal; European–African–Middle Eastern Campaign Medal; World War II Victory Medal; Croix de Guerre with Palm; National Order of the Legion of Honour

Major General Edward W. Anderson (September 23, 1903 – April 12, 1979) was an American military officer involved with flying operations, air education, and command structure. During World War II, he commanded several fighter organizations. Post-war he was involved with air education and Air Force logistics.

== Early life and education ==
Edward W. Anderson was born at Manhattan, Kansas, on 23 September 1903. He graduated from Long Beach High School, and then from Stanford University at Palo Alto in June 1928, majoring in Business Administration. He entered the Army as a flying cadet on 30 October 1928. Upon graduating a year later, he was commissioned a temporary permanent second lieutenant. He received his pilot's wings at Kelly Field, Texas, on 13 October 1929. After receiving additional training at Rockwell Field, California, he was assigned at March Field, California.

== Military career ==
From 1929 to 1933, Anderson served as an assistant engineering officer, flight commander, adjutant school officer, and assistant operations officer at various stations including March Field, California, and Albrook Field, Canal Zone. In 1933, he entered the Air Corps Technical School, Chanute Field, Illinois, graduating in June 1934. After serving with the 24th Pursuit Squadron at Albrook Field from 1934 to 1936, during which time he was promoted to first lieutenant, he became flight commander and operations and intelligence officer of the 94th Pursuit Squadron at Selfridge Field, Michigan.

Anderson was supervisor of the Civil Mechanic School, Air Corps Training Detachment, Boston, Massachusetts, from July 1938, to June 1939. He then attended the Air Corps Tactical School at Maxwell Field, Alabama, from which he graduated in June 1940. He was promoted to captain on 6 January 1940, major on 21 March 1941, and lieutenant colonel on 5 January 1942.

=== World War II ===
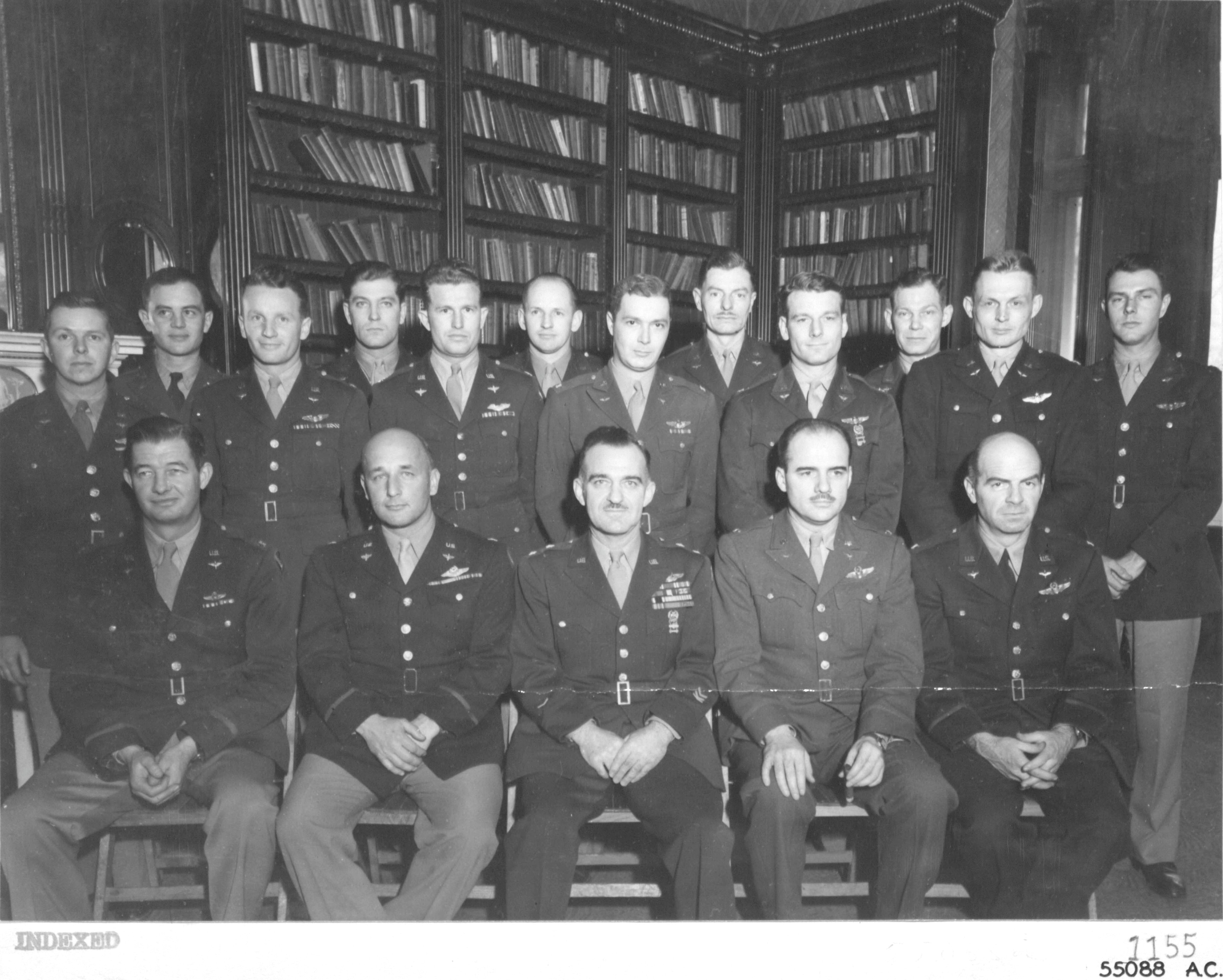
Eighth Air Force fighter group commanding officers; Anderson is seated at front left

Circa 9 March 1942, Anderson became commanding officer of the 20th Fighter Group at Wilmington, North Carolina, and Charlotte, North Carolina, and held this capacity until August 1942. Anderson was promoted to full colonel on 22 August 1942, and went to England in September 1942, to organize the 4th Fighter Group, composed of American pilots who had formed the famed Eagle Squadron in the Royal Air Force. After commanding this group for one year he became commanding officer of the 65th Fighter Wing in England and on 3 March 1944 was promoted to brigadier general.

=== Cold War ===
In July 1945 Anderson returned to the United States and became chief of staff of the I Fighter Command at Mitchel Field, New York. The following year he entered the Air Force Special Staff School at Orlando, Florida, and upon completion of the senior officer course, was assigned as chief of staff of the 1st Air Force at Fort Slocum, New York. In April 1947 he became commanding general of the Air Force Technical Training School at Keesler Field, Mississippi. After one year he was appointed deputy commander and chief of staff of the Technical Division of the Air Training Command at Scott Air Force Base, Illinois. He was promoted to major general on 2 April 1948.

In November 1948 he went to England where he served as chief of staff of the 3rd Air Division at London, England and later as the commanding general of the 59th Air Depot Wing, Burtonwood, England.

He returned to the United States in July 1950 as the assistant deputy chief of staff, comptroller, Headquarters U.S. Air Force, Washington D.C. He left this position in July 1954 and 1 October 1954 assumed command of the San Bernardino Air Materiel Area under the Air Materiel Command at Norton Air Force Base, California. He held this command until his retirement from the Air Force on 1 November 1958.

As a U.S. Air Force major general, he received the Distinguished Service Medal in 1950 and a second award of the Legion of Merit in 1958.

=== Effective dates of promotion ===
Insignia	Rank	Date
	Major general	September 15, 1949
	Brigadier general	March 3, 1944
	Colonel	August 22, 1942
	Lieutenant colonel	January 5, 1942
	Major	March 21, 1941
	Captain	January 6, 1940
	First lieutenant	March 15, 1935
	Second lieutenant	January 6, 1930

== Death ==
Edward Anderson died on 12 April 1979 in San Bernardino County, California.
