= 4th Fighter Group =

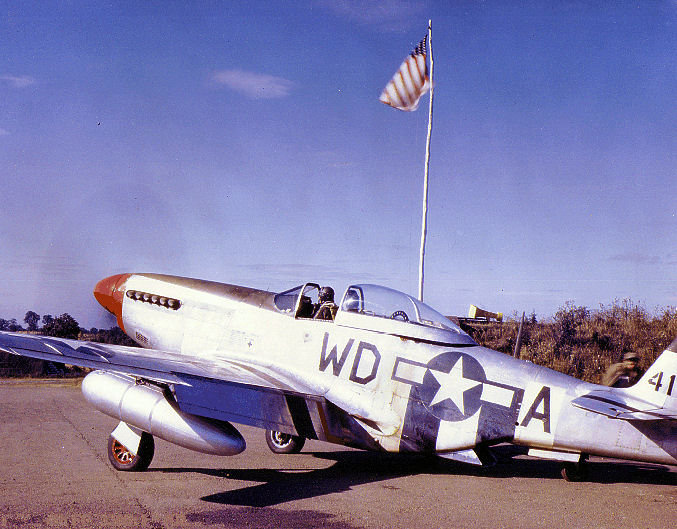
- P-51D Mustang of the 336th Fighter Squadron, 4th Fighter Group
- Active: 12 September 1942–10 November 1945
- Country: United States
- Branch: United States Army Air Forces
- Garrison/HQ: RAF Debden
- Nickname: Debden Eagles
- Motto: Fourth But First
- Engagements: Air Offensive, Europe; Normandy; Market Garden; Battle of the Bulge; Invasion of Germany
- Decorations: Distinguished Unit Citation
- Website: http://www.4thfightergroupassociation.org/

Commanders
- Notable commanders: Edward W. Anderson; Chesley G. Peterson; Donald Blakeslee; Everett W. Stewart

Insignia
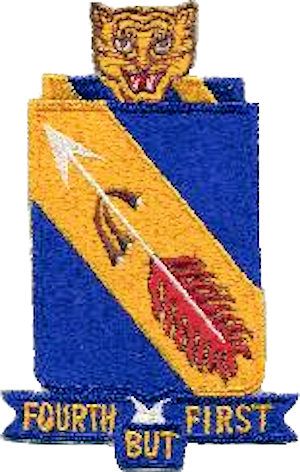
- 4th Fighter Group Emblem
- 334th Fighter Squadron: QP
- 335th Fighter Squadron: WD
- 336th Fighter Squadron: VF

Aircraft flown
- Fighter: Supermarine Spitfire 1942–1943; P-47 Thunderbolt 1943–1944; P-51 Mustang 1944–1945

The 4th Fighter Group was an American element of the United States Army Air Forces (USAAF) Eighth Air Force during World War II. The group was known as the Debden Eagles because it was created from the three Eagle Squadrons of the Royal Air Force: No. 71, No. 121 Squadron RAF, and No. 133 Squadron RAF. These squadrons became the 334th, 335th, and 336th Fighter Squadrons of the 4th Fighter Group based at RAF Debden. The group was the first fighter group to fly combat missions over German airspace, one of the first to escort bombers over Berlin, and the first selected to escort bombers on shuttle bombing runs landing in Russia. The group was credited with shooting down 1,016 German planes.

== Eagle Squadrons ==
The Eagle Squadrons were formed in 1940 with volunteer pilots from the United States prior to its entry into World War II in December 1941. The three Eagle Squadrons formed between September 1940 and July 1941 were turned over to the Eighth Air Force. They existed until 29 September 1942 and became the 4th Fighter Group of the United States Army Air Forces Eighth Air Force. The 71, 121, and 133 squadrons became the 334th, 335th and 336th Fighter Squadron and transferred as complete units.

== European theatre ==
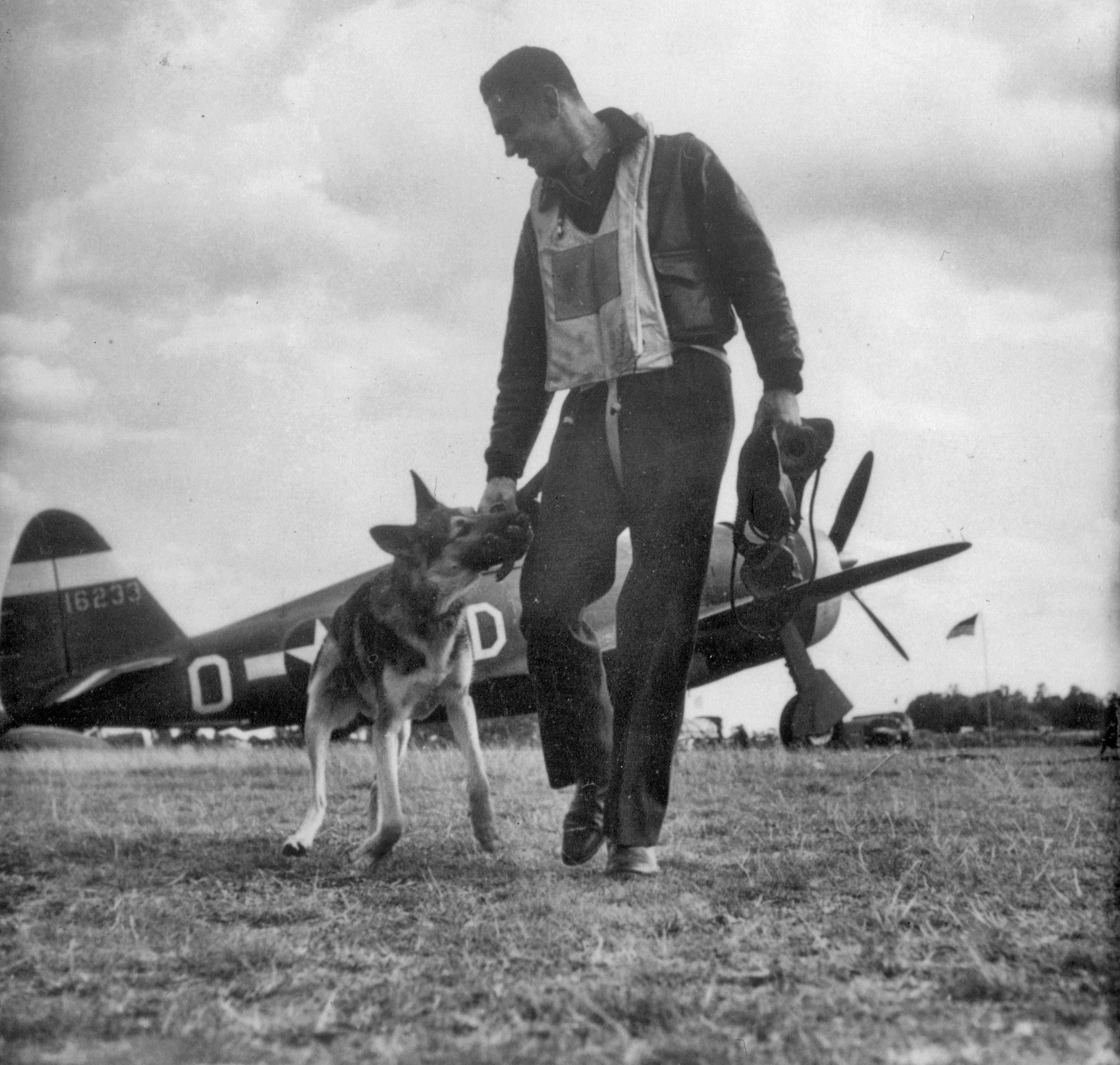
Lieutenant Howard Hively of the 335th Fighter Squadron, 4th Fighter Group with his dog mascot "Duke" and a P-47 Thunderbolt at Debden, October 1943

The group was briefly at RAF Bushey Hall before moving to Debden in late September, 1942. They served in combat over Europe from October 1942 to April 1945 and was the longest serving USAAF fighter group in the European theatre of World War II. It was assigned to VIII Fighter Command, 12 September 1942 and the 4th Air Defense (later, 65th Fighter) Wing, July 1943 – November 1945.

The group operated until 1 April 1943 using Spitfires. Aircraft were changed to P-47 Thunderbolts on 1 April 1943 and then to P-51 Mustangs on 25 February 1944.

The 4th along with the 354th Fighter Group were the first to escort U.S. bombers over Berlin on 4 March 1944. The 4th earned Distinguished Unit Citation (DUC) for aggressiveness in attacking enemy aircraft and air bases, 5 March – 24 April 1944. The group escorted bombers in the first shuttle bombing mission from Britain to Russia on 21 June 1944, supported the airborne invasion of Holland in September, participated in the Battle of the Bulge, December 1944 – January 1945, and covered the airborne assault across the Rhine in March 1945.

The 4th claimed 583 enemy planes shot down in air-to-air combat during the war, for a victory-loss ratio of 2.35-to-1. Pilot losses were 125 killed-in-action (including missing-presumed-dead) and 105 prisoners-of-war, of 553 pilots serving, or 42%.

The group was credited by VIII Fighter Command as having the most combined victories over German aircraft (583 air, 469 ground against 248 combat losses) of any group in the Eighth Air Force, and scoring the fourth highest number of air-to-air victories in Europe. Aircraft losses totaled 248 planes: 8 Spitfire VB, 28 P-47C and P-47D, and 212 P-51B and P-51D.

The group moved to RAF Steeple Morden from July to November, 1945 and returned to the U.S. and was inactivated on 10 November 1945.

== Top aces ==
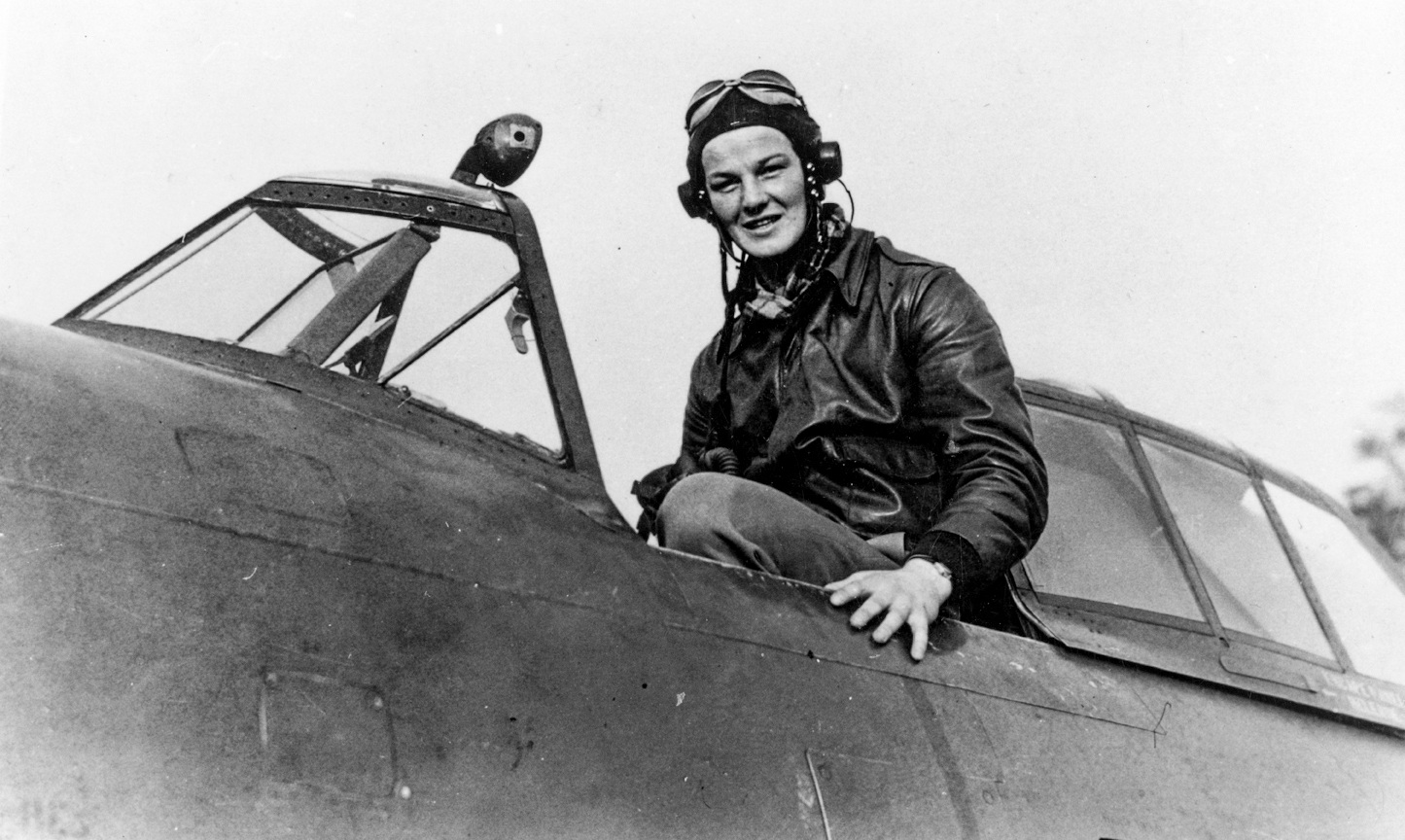
Triple ace Ralph Kidd Hofer in his P-47 Thunderbolt "Sho-Me".

Top aces (aerial victories) in the group were Dominic Salvatore Gentile (21.83), Duane Beeson (17.33), John T. Godfrey (16.33), James A. Goodson (15), Ralph K. Hofer (15), and Donald Blakeslee (14.5).

Don Gentile joined the RAF 133 Eagle Squadron after going to Canada for training in 1940. He was with the squadron when it converted to the 336th Fighter Squadron in 1942. General Dwight D. Eisenhower referred to Gentile as a one-man Air Force. John Godfrey was Gentile's close friend and wingman; Winston Churchill referred to the pair as Damon and Pythias of the twentieth century.

Duane Beeson joined the Royal Canadian Air Force in 1941 and was transferred to Britain to join RAF No. 71 Eagle Squadron in 1942. He was assigned to the 334th Fighter Squadron in September 1942. He was shot down over Germany on 5 April 1944 and was held in Stalag Luft I until April 1945.

James Goodson joined the Royal Canadian Air Force in 1941 before transferring to No. 43 Squadron RAF, followed by No. 416 Squadron RAF, then the No. 133 Eagle Squadron, based at Debden. In September 1942, he transferred to the 4th Fighter Group, 336th Squadron. He was shot down near Peenemünde 20 June 1944 and was held in Stalag Luft III until liberation in 1945.

Ralph Kidd Hofer was a light heavyweight boxer who joined the RCAF in 1941 and transferred to the 4th Fighter Group, 334th Squadron at Debden in July 1943. Hofer and his plane were lost 2 July 1944 near Mostar, Yugoslavia after a bomber escort mission to Budapest.

== Commanders ==
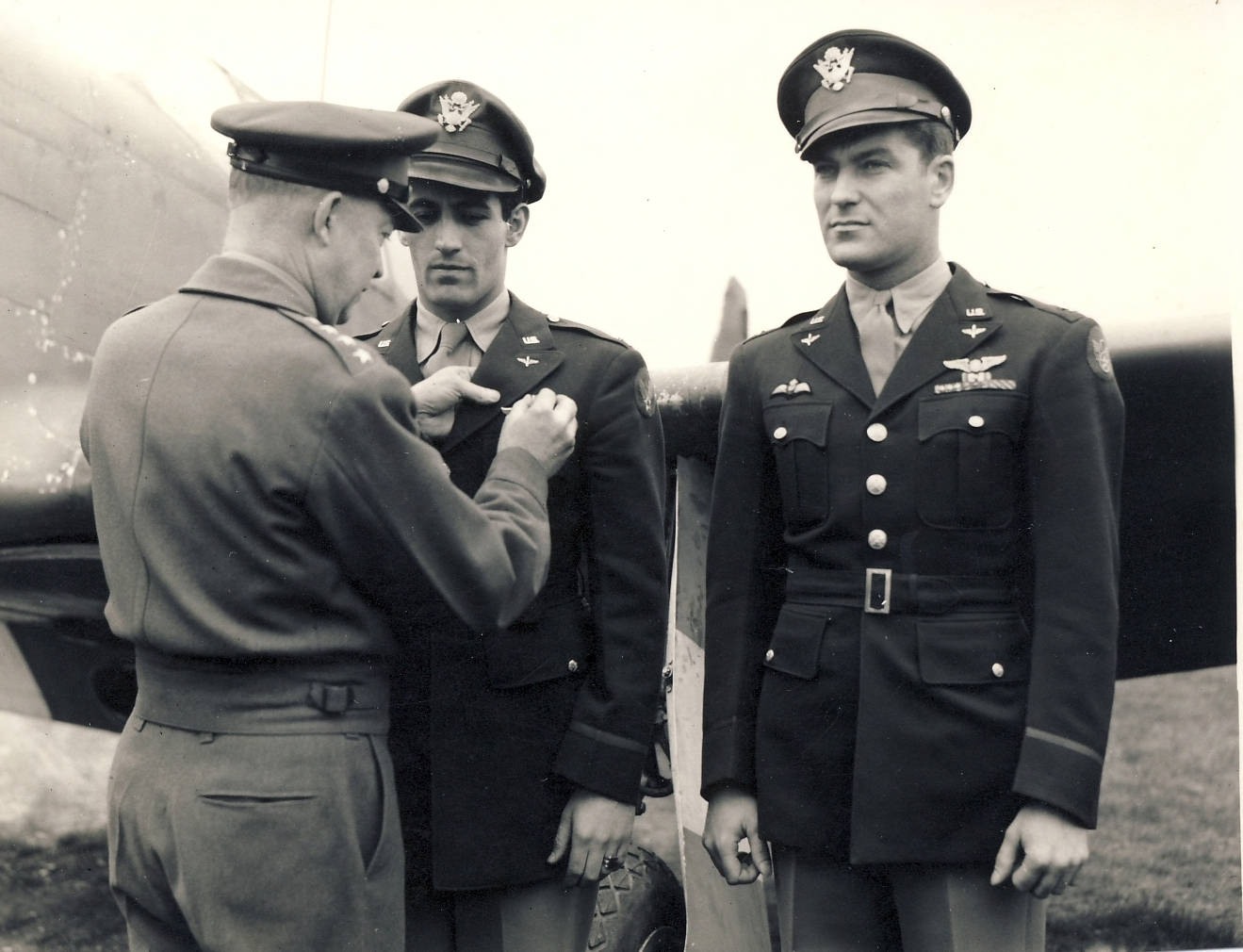
Don Gentile (left) and Donald Blakeslee receiving the Distinguished Service Cross from General Dwight D. Eisenhower

- Col Edward W. Anderson, September 1942
- Col Chesley G. Peterson, 20 August 1943
- Col Donald J. M. Blakeslee, 1 January 1944
- Lt Col James A. Clark Jr., 7 September 1944 (acting)
- Lt Col Clairborne H. Kinnard Jr., 15 September 1944 (acting)
- Col Donald J. M. Blakeslee, 20 October 1944
- Lt Col Clairborne H. Kinnard Jr., c. 3 November 1944
- Lt Col Harry J. Dayhuff, 7 December 1944
- Col Everett W. Stewart, 21 February 1945
- Lt Col William E. Becker, September 1945-unknown
- Col Ernest H. Beverly, 9 September 1946

== See also ==
- Pierce McKennon
- Steve Pisanos
- Vermont Garrison
- Carroll W. McColpin
- Wolf-Dietrich Wilcke
