= No. 121 Squadron RAF =

Defunct flying squadron of the Royal Air Force

No. 121 (Eagle) Squadron RAF
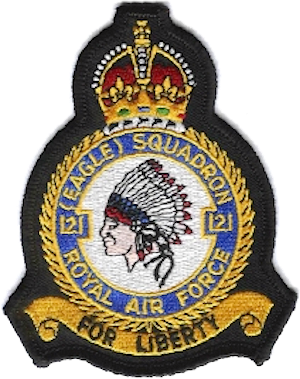
- 121 (Eagle) Squadron, RAF, 1940
- Active: 1 April 1918 - 17 August 1918; 14 May 1941 – 29 September 1942
- Country: United Kingdom
- Allegiance: United Kingdom; United States (September 1942)
- Branch: Royal Air Force
- Nickname: Eagle
- Motto: For liberty

Insignia
- Squadron Badge heraldry: An Indian warrior's head with head dress
- Squadron Codes: AV (May 1941 - September 1942)

No. 121 Squadron was a Royal Air Force (RAF) aircraft squadron that during the Second World War was one of the three Eagle Squadrons manned by American volunteers. There is a Royal Air Force Air Cadets squadron, based in Nuneaton, which shares its number.

== First World War ==
No. 121 Squadron Royal Flying Corps (Royal Air Force from 1 April 1918) was formed at Narborough on 1 January 1918 as a day bomber squadron to operate the Airco DH.9. The squadron was equipped with Airco DH.4s for training, but due to delays with the DH.9 and the end of the war approaching, the squadron was disbanded on 17 August 1918 without becoming operational.

== Second World War ==
=== RAF Service ===
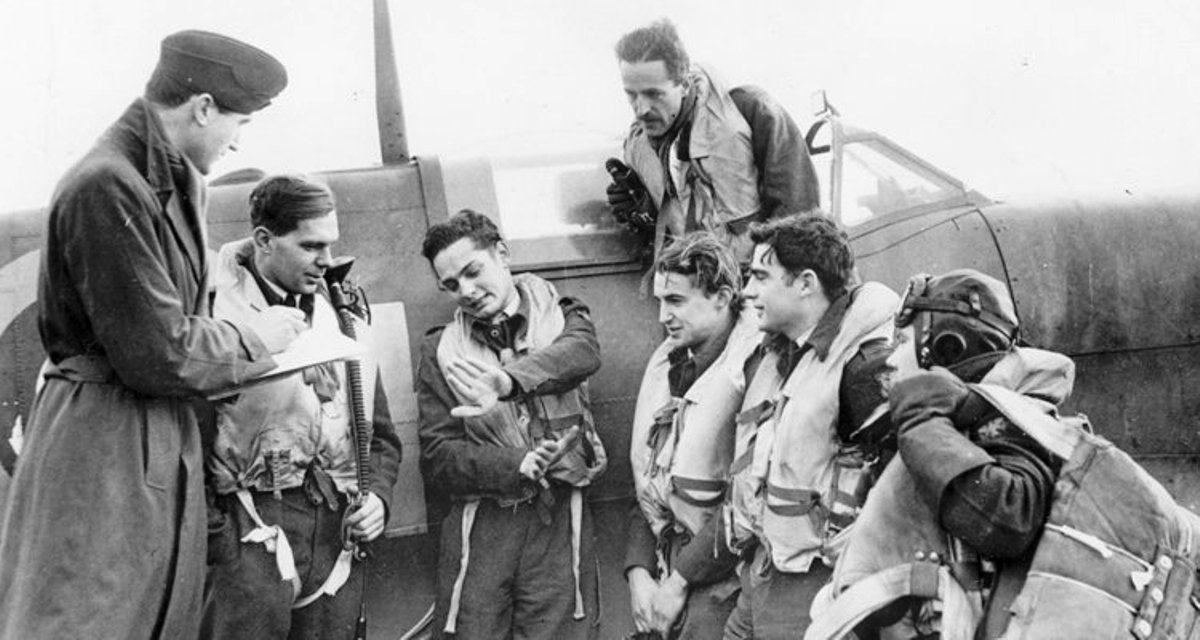
RAF Intelligence Officer is shown recording comments of American aviators from Eagle Squadron

The squadron was reformed on 14 May 1941 as No. 121 (Eagle) Squadron at RAF Kirton-in-Lindsey, the second of three Eagle Squadrons manned by American volunteers. Equipped with the Hawker Hurricane, the squadron then converted to the Supermarine Spitfire and moved south to RAF North Weald to begin operations on channel sweeps and Rhubarb operations. On 15 November 1941 the squadron claimed its first enemy aircraft destroyed. The squadron then upgraded to cannon-armed Spitfire VBs and carried out offensive operations over the channel and providing bomber escorts.

=== To the USAAF ===
In September 1942, the squadron moved to RAF Debden to be with the other Eagle squadrons. The squadron was transferred to the United States Army Air Forces as the 335th Fighter Squadron and officially disbanded as a RAF unit on 29 September 1942. The new squadron became part of the 4th Fighter Group of the Eighth Air Force.

== Aircraft operated ==
| Dates | Aircraft | Variant | Notes |
|---|---|---|---|
| Jan 1918 - Aug 1918 | Airco DH.4 | | |
| May 1941 - Jul 1941 | Hawker Hurricane | Mk.I | |
| Jul 1941 - Nov 1941 | Hawker Hurricane | Mk.IIb | |
| Oct 1941 - Nov 1941 | Supermarine Spitfire | Mk.IIa | |
| Nov 1941 - Sep 1942 | Supermarine Spitfire | Mk.Vb | |

== See also ==
- List of Royal Air Force aircraft squadrons
- 335th Fighter Squadron
- Eagle Squadrons
