= No. 71 Squadron RAF =

Defunct flying squadron of the Royal Air Force

No. 71 (Eagle) Squadron RAF
- No. 71 Squadron badge
- Active: 27 March 1917 – 19 January 1918; 19 September 1940 – 29 September 1942; 16 September 1950 – 30 April 1957
- Country: United Kingdom
- Allegiance: United Kingdom; United States (September 1942)
- Branch: Royal Air Force
- Nickname: Eagle
- Motto: First from the eyries

Insignia
- Squadron Badge heraldry: A bald-headed eagle displayed charged with three stars of nine points
- Post 1950 Squadron Roundel
- Squadron Codes: XR (November 1940 – September 1942, also used initially on transfer to USAAF); L (September 1950 – October 1953)

No. 71 Squadron was a Royal Air Force aircraft squadron. The number has been used three times: once by the Royal Flying Corps for an Australian Flying Corps squadron; in the Second World War as the first of three Eagle Squadrons; and post-war as a fighter-bomber unit under the command of Royal Air Force Germany.

== History ==
=== First World War ===
The first unit known by the British military as "No. 71 Squadron" was No. 4 Squadron, Australian Flying Corps (AFC), during the First World War. The squadron was formed at Point Cook, Victoria, Australia on 16 October 1916, after which it travelled to England. From 27 March 1917, while based at Castle Bromwich, it was designated "No. 71 Squadron" by the Royal Flying Corps, to avoid confusion with No. 4 Squadron, RFC. This name was never officially adopted by the Australian Imperial Force.

4 Sqn AFC arrived in France on 18 December 1917. With Sopwith Camels, it performed fighter sweeps, provided close air support and raided German airfields. In spite of its relatively short service during the First World War, 11 of its pilots became aces, including Captain Harry Cobby, the AFC's leading ace of the war, who was credited with destroying 29 aircraft and 13 observation balloons. Besides Cobby, Elwyn King, Edgar McCloughry (later an air vice-marshal), Herbert Watson, Thomas Baker, Leonard Taplin, Thomas Barkell, George Jones (later Chief of the Australian Air Force), Norman Trescowthick, and Garnet Malley served in the unit.

On 19 January 1918, British usage of "No. 71 Squadron" for this unit also ceased, and it became No. 4 AFC at every level. The squadron spent some time with the Army of Occupation in Germany after the Armistice and was disbanded there at Bickendorf on 28 February 1919.

=== American Eagles ===
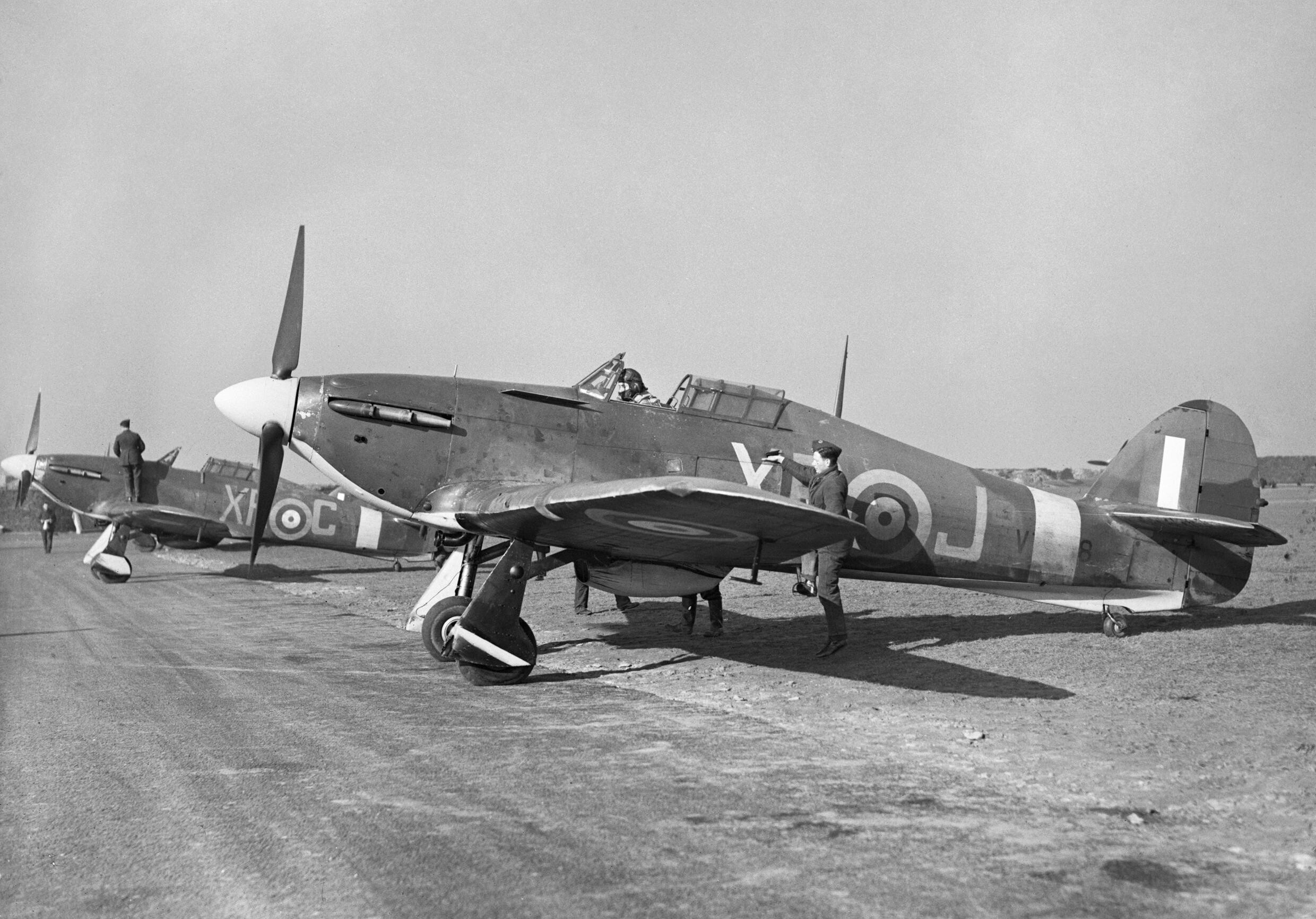
A Hawker Hurricane fight of No. 71 Squadron at Kirton-in-Lindsey, 1941

At the start of the Second World War before the US entered the war, there were a large number of American volunteers offering their services. No. 71 was formed at RAF Church Fenton on 19 September 1940 as the first of the Eagle Squadrons with Brewster Buffalos. Appraisal by Royal Air Force acceptance personnel criticised the Brewster Buffalo on numerous points, including lack of armament and pilot armour, poor high-altitude performance, engine overheating, unreliability and cockpit controls, while it was praised for its handling, roomy cockpit and visibility.

The Buffaloes were deemed unsuitable for European conditions and Hawker Hurricanes replaced them from November 1940. The squadron became operational at RAF Kirton-in-Lindsey on 5 February 1941 and moved in April to RAF Martlesham Heath in Suffolk for operations over Europe. During May, it suffered its first loss when Mike Kolendorski was killed during a fighter sweep over the Netherlands. The intensity of operations stepped up with a move to No. 11 Group of Fighter Command, being based at RAF North Weald in Essex by June. On 2 July, William I. Hall became the first Eagle Squadron pilot to become a prisoner of war (POW) when he was shot down during an escort mission. The squadron's first confirmed victory came on 21 July during a bomber escort mission, when Pilot Officer William R. Dunn destroyed a Messerschmitt Bf 109F over Lille.

In August, the Spitfire Mk II replaced 71 Squadron's Hurricanes, before the squadron quickly re-equipped with the latest Spitfire Mk VB. The unit soon established a high reputation, and numerous air kill claims were made in RAF fighter sweeps over the continent during the remainder of the summer and into autumn. In December, the squadron was rested back at Martlesham Heath, before a move to Debden in May 1942. When informed of the attack on Pearl Harbor, most of the Eagle Squadron pilots wanted to immediately join the fight against Japan. Representatives from Nos. 71 and 121 Squadrons went to the American Embassy in London and offered their services to the United States. The pilots from No. 71 Squadron decided they wanted to go to Singapore to fight the Japanese and a proposal was put to RAF Fighter Command, but it was turned down. On 29 September the squadron, together with the other two Eagle squadrons, was transferred to the US Army Air Forces, becoming the 334th Fighter Squadron of the 4th Fighter Group.

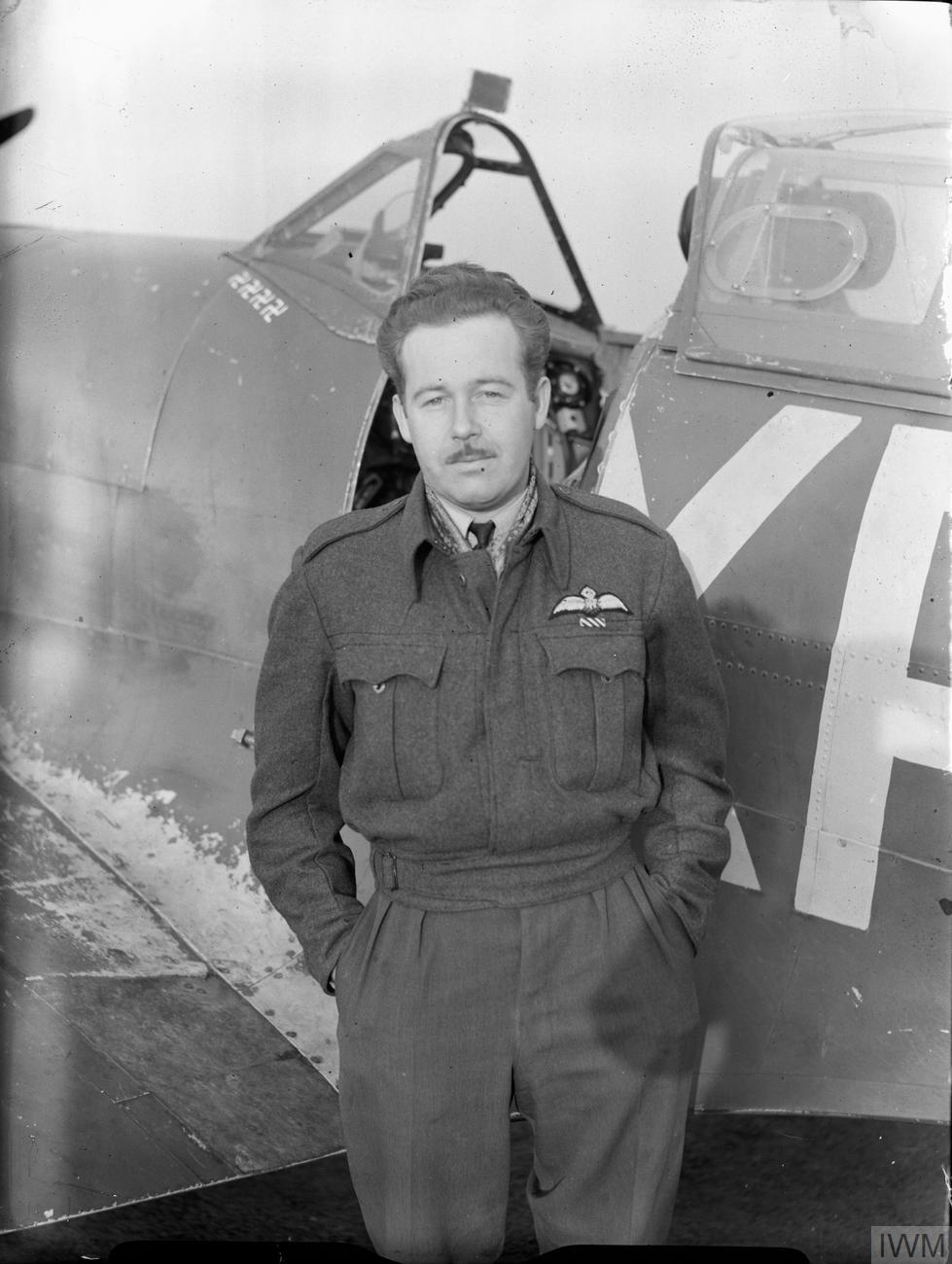
Pilot Officer C W "Red" McColpin of No 71 (Eagle) Squadron RAF, standing by his Supermarine Spitfire Mark VB at North Weald, Essex

=== Into the jet age ===
On 16 September 1950 a new 71 Squadron was formed at RAF Gütersloh with de Havilland Vampire fighter-bombers, joining the Second Tactical Air Force. In October 1953 it became a "day fighter" unit with the North American Sabre. The Sabres were replaced by Hawker Hunters in April 1956. The squadron moved to RAF Bruggen in May 1956 and disbanded on 30 April 1957.

== Aircraft operated ==
Dates	Aircraft	Variant	Notes
June 1917 – October 1917	Various		
October 1917 – January 1918	Sopwith Camel		4 Sqn Australian Flying Corps (a.k.a. 71 Sqn RFC)
October 1940 – November 1940	Brewster Buffalo	I	
November 1940 – May 1941	Hawker Hurricane	I	
April 1941 – August 1941	Hawker Hurricane	IIB	
August 1941 – September 1941	Supermarine Spitfire	IIA	
September 1941 – September 1942	Supermarine Spitfire	VB	
October 1950 – October 1953	de Havilland Vampire	FB.5	
October 1953 – May 1956	North American Sabre	F.4	
April 1956 – April 1957	Hawker Hunter	F.4	

== See also ==
- List of Royal Air Force aircraft squadrons
- 334th Fighter Squadron
