= Damon and Pythias (disambiguation) =

Damon and Pythias is a legend in Greek historic writings.

Damon and Pythias may also refer to:

- Damon and Pythias (play), a play by Richard Edwards printed in 1571
- Damon and Pythias (1821 play), a 19th century play by John Banim
- Damon and Pythias (1914 film), an American silent epic film directed by Otis Turner
- Damon and Pythias (1962 film), an Italian/American film directed by Curtis Bernhardt
- Don Gentile and John T. Godfrey, fighter pilots for the United States Army Air Forces during World War II

== See also ==
- Damon (disambiguation)
- Pythias (disambiguation)
