= Pythias (disambiguation) =

Pythias was a Greek biologist and embryologist, and the first wife of Aristotle.

Pythias may also refer to:

- Damon and Pythias, characters in Greek mythology
- Pythias (Roman) (1st century AD), Roman slave
- Knights of Pythias, an American fraternal organization and secret society

== See also ==
- Pythius (disambiguation)
- Pytheas (4th century BC), Greek explorer from modern day Marseilles
- Pytheas (crater), a lunar crater
- Pythia, oracle
