= Pythius (disambiguation) =

Pythius may refer to:

- Pythius, a historical Lydian
- Pythius of Priene, a Greek architect
- Pythius, a synonym of Euphorbia
- Pythius, an epithet of Apollo

== See also ==
- Pythias (disambiguation)
- Pytheas (4th century BC), Greek explorer from modern day Marseilles
- Pytheas (crater), a lunar crater
