= Benjamin H. King =

Brigadier General in the United States Air Force

Benjamin Hardin King
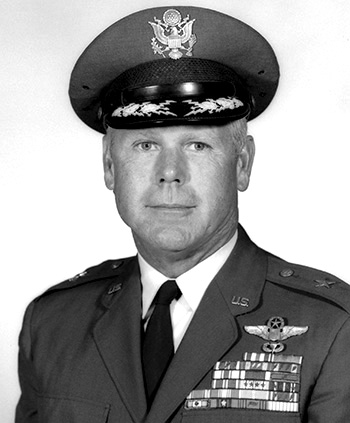
- Born: December 9, 1919; Ad Lee, Oklahoma, U.S.
- Died: October 5, 2004 (aged 84); Florence, Oregon, U.S.
- Military career
- Allegiance: United States of America
- Branch: United States Air Force
- Service years: 1942–1971
- Rank: Brigadier General
- Nickname: "Ben"
- Units: 347th Fighter Group; 359th Fighter Group; 49th Fighter-Bomber Group
- Commands: 57th Fighter Group; 65th Fighter Squadron; 336th Fighter Squadron; 41st Fighter-Interceptor Squadron; 8th Fighter-Bomber Squadron; 121st Fighter Interceptor Squadron; 4400th Combat Crew Training Squadron; 4400th Combat Crew Training Group; 525th Air Defense Group; 1400th Operations Group; 82nd Fighter Group; 4750th Air Defense Wing; 1st Combat Applications Group; Los Angeles Air Defense Sector; Fourth Air Force
- Conflicts: World War II; Korean War; Vietnam War
- Awards: Air Force Distinguished Service Medal; Silver Star; Legion of Merit (2); Distinguished Flying Cross (4); Purple Heart; Air Medal (26)

Benjamin Hardin King (December 9, 1919 - October 5, 2004) was a United States Air Force Brigadier General and a flying ace. King flew combat missions in World War II, Korean War and Vietnam War, and was credited in destroying 7 enemy aircraft in aerial combat during World War II. He retired in 1971, after 29 years of distinguished service.

== Early life ==
King was born on December 9, 1919. He attended high school in Fayetteville, Arkansas before completing one year of college at the University of Oklahoma. Afterwards, he was employed as a welder.

== Military career ==
On February 28, 1942, King enlisted as an aviation cadet in the United States Army Air Forces at Will Rogers Field in Oklahoma City and was flying cadet at Kelly Field in Texas. In October 1942, he completed his flight training at Foster Field in Texas, and earned his wings and commission of Second lieutenant.

=== World War II ===
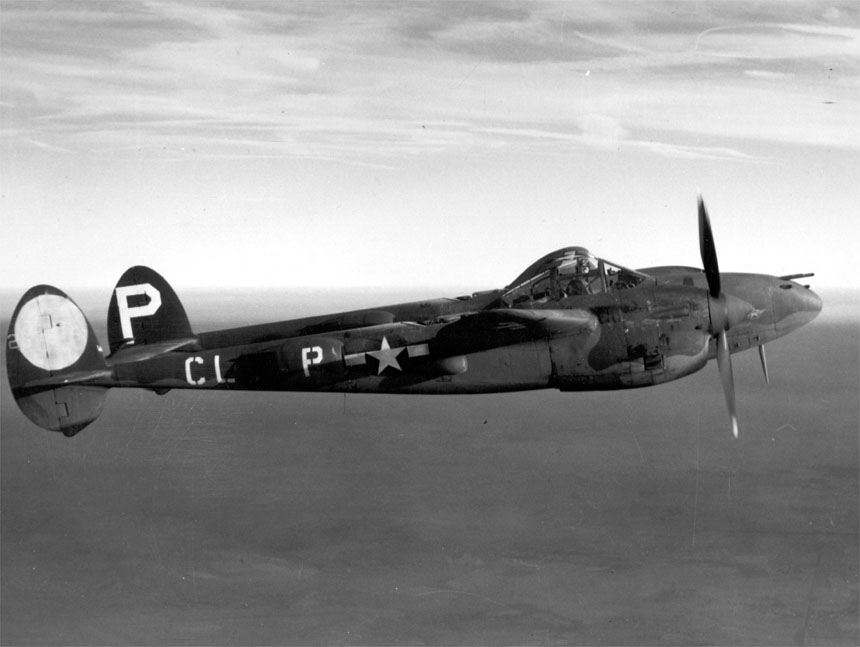
P-38 Lightning

In February 1943, after completing transition training in the Bell P-39 Airacobra, King was assigned to the 339th Fighter Squadron of the 347th Fighter Group. Stationed in Guadalcanal and later on Stirling Island, the unit flew P-39s and later the Lockheed P-38 Lightnings.

On July 22, 1943, King took part in a bomber escort of B-24 Liberators over Kahili Airfield on southern Bougainville. After the formation reached over the target, they were intercepted by Japanese A6M Zeroes. King managed to shoot down two of them, before he was attacked and chased by Zeroes. As a result, he was forced to ditch his aircraft off Kotulu Island near Vella Lavella. When he failed to return to base, he was officially listed as Missing In Action (MIA).

After ditching, King successfully deployed his life raft and spent five days at sea before reaching Mono Island on July 22, 1943. The natives of the island rescued him, and hid him and six U.S. Navy aviators from Japanese patrols on several occasions for 60 days. On September 13, King and four other aviators departed and spent four days in the raft at sea observing Japanese and Allied aircraft overhead. On September 18, the men heard a Royal New Zealand Navy PBY Catalina flying over them and they lit a flare in a can of kerosene as a signal. Spotting the light, the Catalina kept circling for 2 1/2 hours before landing next to the raft and picking the men up. They were flown to Henderson Field on Guadalcanal.

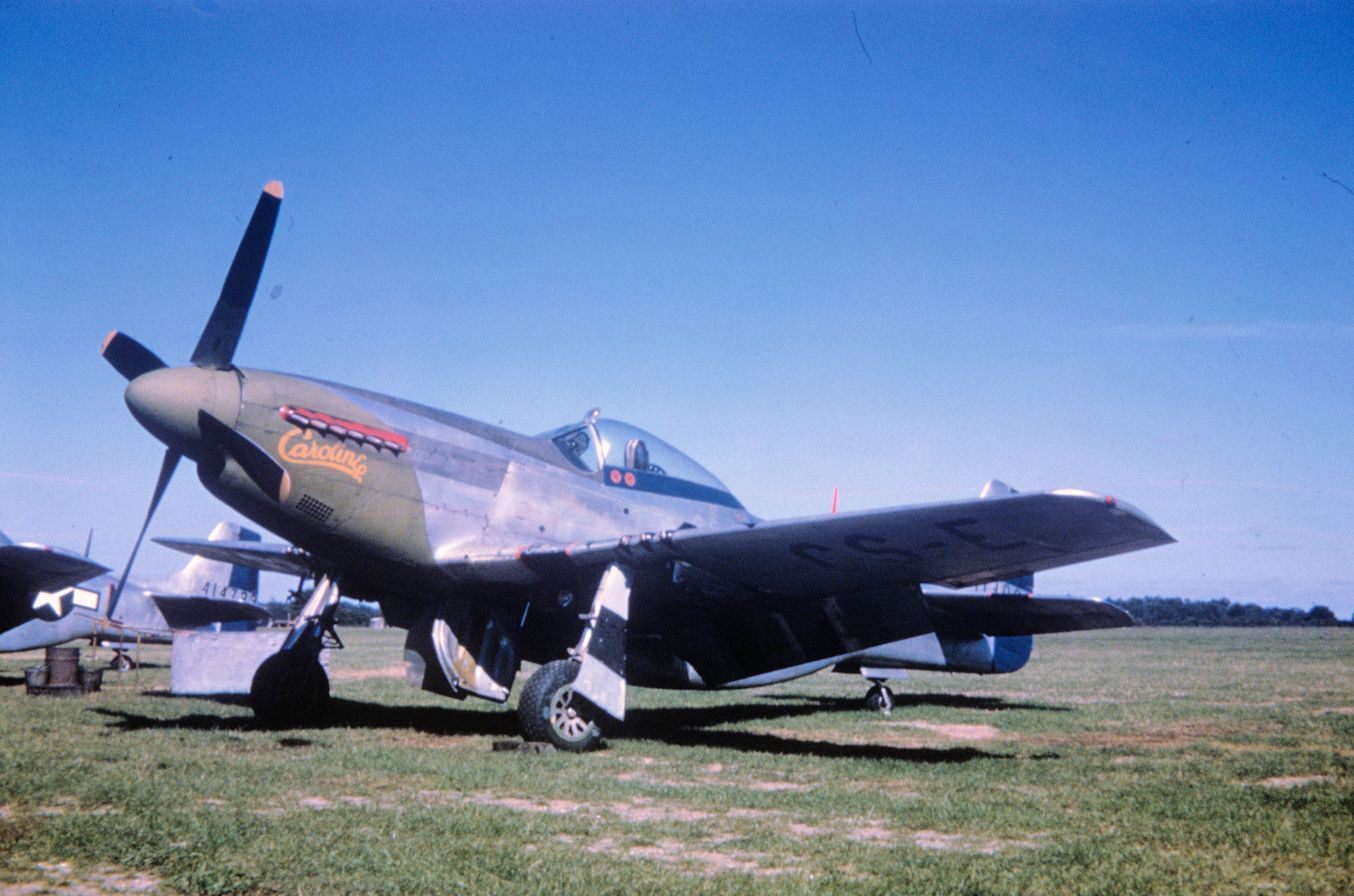
P-51 Mustang of 359th FG

After his recovery, King continued flying combat missions. On November 1, 1943, he scored his third and final aerial victory in the Pacific, when he shot down a Zero over Empress Augusta Bay. After his return to the United States in August 1944, he was assigned as a P-51 Mustang pilot and operations officer of the 368th Fighter Squadron of the 359th Fighter Group in England. Stationed at RAF East Wretham, he flew missions in the European Theater of Operations.

His biggest day was on September 11, 1944. On that date, during a bomber escort to Merseburg, Germany, King's formation encountered 50 German fighters over Eisleben, Germany. In the aerial battle, King shot down two Fw 190s and one Bf 109. For his heroism, he was awarded the Silver Star. King scored his last aerial victory of the war, when he shot down a Bf 109 on September 12.

During World War II, King was credited with the destruction of 7 enemy aircraft in aerial combat. During his time with 347th FG and 358th FG, he flew P-38 and P-51s named 'Matilda', in honor of his mother.

=== Post war ===
After the end of World War II, King commanded several fighter units over the next five years, including 57th Fighter Group from August to December 1946, 65th Fighter Squadron from December 1946 to May 1948, 336th Fighter Squadron from September 1948 to June 1949 and 41st Fighter-Interceptor Squadron from August to September 1950. He graduated from the Army Command and General Staff School in February 1946 and from the Air Command and Staff College in June 1950.

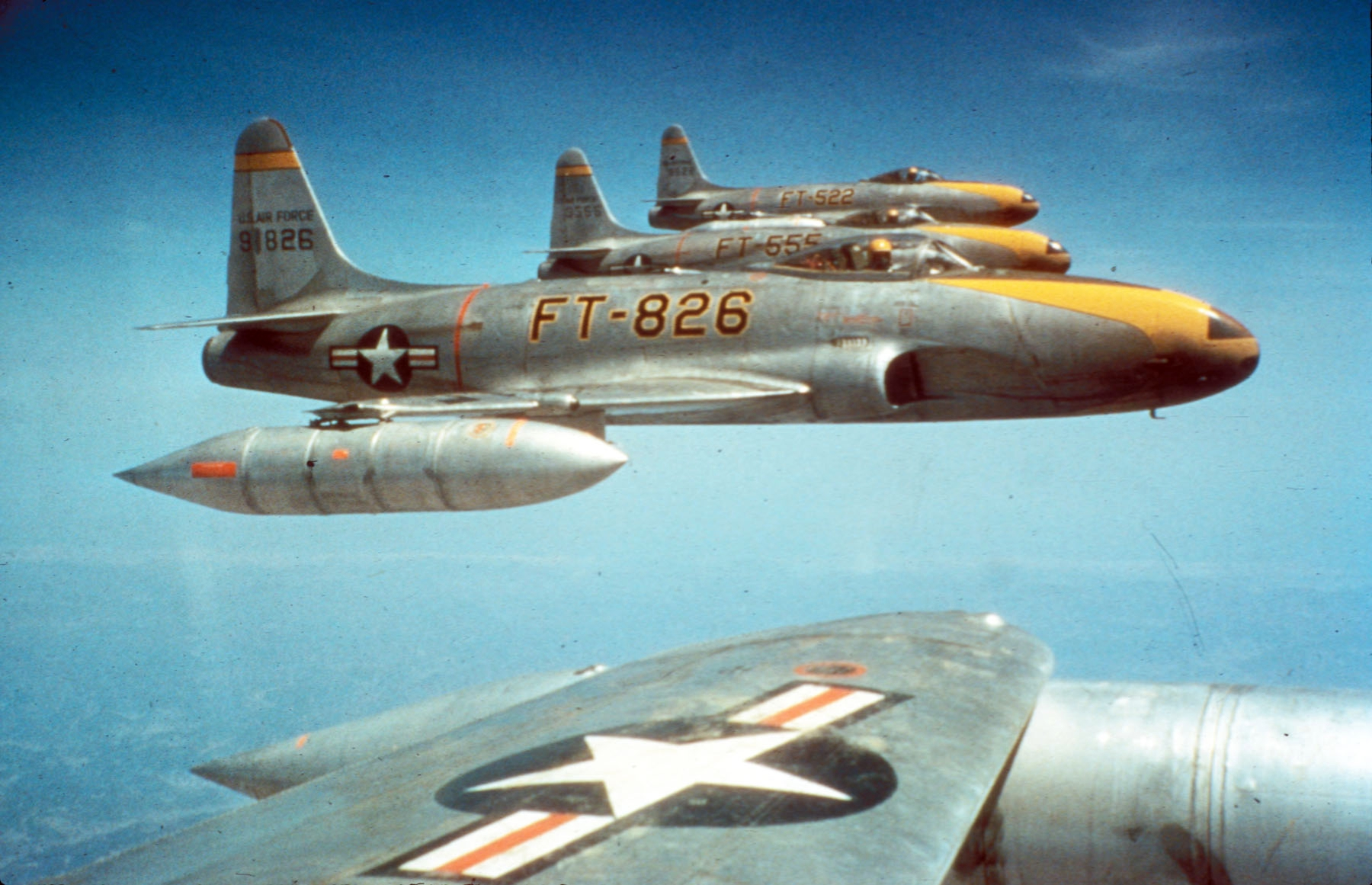
8th FBS F-80Cs over Korea

During the Korean War, King served as commander of 8th Fighter-Bomber Squadron. Stationed at Taegu Air Base in South Korea, he flew 226 combat missions in the F-51 Mustangs and Lockheed F-80 Shooting Stars from October 1950 to April 1951. He served in the staff of the Fifth Air Force at Taegu AB from April to July 1951. During the war, he destroyed two enemy aircraft on the ground.

After returning to the United States in July 1951, he was appointed as commander of the 121st Fighter Interceptor Squadron at Andrews Air Force Base in Maryland and served until November 1952. Over the next five years, he served in a variety of command and staff positions in the Air Force.

From January 1957 until July 1959, King was assigned as deputy commander and commander of 4750th Air Defense Group at Vincent Air Force Base in Arizona. He moved with the wing to MacDill Air Force Base in Florida. In July 1960, he was reassigned as director of Joint Bomarc Test Staff in Detachment 1 of Montgomery Air Defense Sector at Eglin Air Force Base.

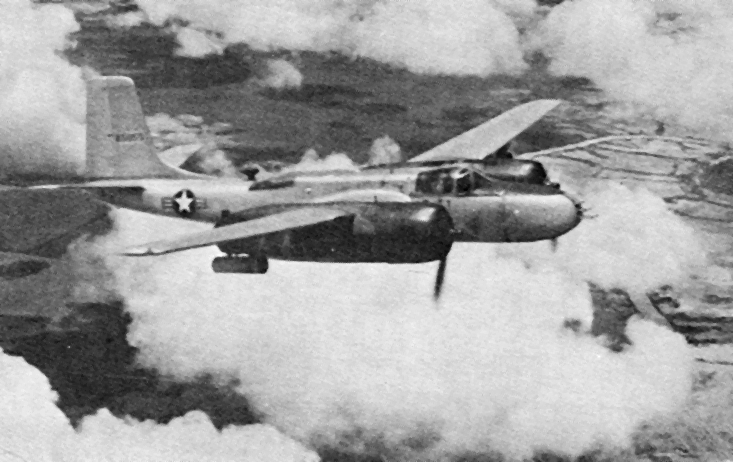
B-26B over South Vietnam

From May 1961 until March 1962, he served as commander of 4400th Combat Crew Training Squadron and 4400th CCT Group at Eglin Air Force Auxiliary Field #9 in Florida, and in April 1962 he was assigned as commander of 1st Combat Applications Group at Eglin Air Force Base. During this time, he helped in the formation of Air Commandos at Hurlburt Field in Florida. Within five months, he was sent to South Vietnam in November 1961 with the unit to fight the Communist threat from North Vietnam under the guise of training South Vietnamese Air Force pilots in guerrilla warfare tactics.

King was assigned in October 1963 as deputy director, Office of the Secretary of Defense Advisory Research Project Agency Field Unit in Bangkok, Thailand. During this period, he flew some 100 missions in Vietnam in T-28 Trojan, C-47 Skytrain, L-28 and B-26 Invader.

He returned to the United States in October 1964 and was assigned to the Aerospace Defense Command. He served as vice commander, Los Angeles Air Defense Sector at Norton Air Force Base in California. King served as deputy for operations for 28th Air Division and Fourth Air Force. He was later appointed as vice commander of Fourth Air Force at Hamilton Air Force Base in California.

In August 1967, he became command inspector general at Headquarters Aerospace Defense Command at Ent Air Force Base in Colorado, and in January 1969 he became director of aerospace safety at the Office of the Deputy Inspector General for Inspection and Safety at Norton Air Force Base.

He retired from the Air Force on February 1, 1971.

== Later life ==
King and his wife Maxine had a son and daughter. After his retirement from the Air Force, he lived in Arizona and later in Oregon. He was inducted into the Oklahoma Aviation Hall of Fame in 1995.

He died on October 5, 2004, at age of 84. During his memorial services, he was honored with a missing man formation by F-15 Eagles of the Oregon Air National Guard. In accordance to his wishes, he was cremated and his ashes scattered over the Pacific Ocean.

== Aerial victory credits ==
Date	#	Type	Location	Aircraft flown	Unit Assigned
July 17, 1943	2	Mitsubishi A6M Zero	Buin, Papua New Guinea	P-38 Lightning	339 FS, 347 FG
November 1, 1943	1	A6M Zero	Empress Augusta Bay, Papua New Guinea	P-38 Lightning	339 FS, 347 FG
September 11, 1944	2	Focke-Wulf Fw 190	Eisleben, Germany	P-51D Mustang	368 FS, 359 FG
September 11, 1944	1	Messerschmitt Bf 109	Eisleben, Germany	P-51D Mustang	368 FS, 359 FG
September 12, 1944	1	Bf 109	Gransee, Germany	P-51D Mustang	368 FS, 359 FG

SOURCES: Air Force Historical Study 85: USAF Credits for the Destruction of Enemy Aircraft, World War II

== Awards and decorations ==
He has accumulated more than 6,000 hours of flying time, including 1,146 combat hours logged in 400 combat missions. His decorations include the Silver Star, Legion of Merit, Distinguished Flying Cross with three oak leaf clusters, Air Medal with 24 oak leaf clusters and Purple Heart, and the French and Belgian Croix de Guerre.

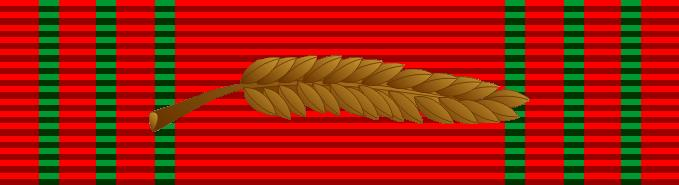

U.S. Air Force Command Pilot Badge
U.S. Air Force Parachutist Badge
Air Force Distinguished Service Medal	Silver Star	Legion of Merit with bronze oak leaf cluster
Distinguished Flying Cross with three bronze oak leaf cluster	Purple Heart	Air Medal with four silver oak leaf clusters
Air Medal with four bronze oak leaf clusters (second ribbon required for accoutrement spacing)	Air Force Commendation Medal with bronze oak leaf cluster	Air Force Presidential Unit Citation with bronze oak leaf cluster
Air Force Outstanding Unit Award	American Campaign Medal	Asiatic-Pacific Campaign Medal with four bronze campaign stars
European-African-Middle Eastern Campaign Medal with four bronze campaign stars	World War II Victory Medal	National Defense Service Medal with bronze service star
Korean Service Medal with silver campaign star	Armed Forces Expeditionary Medal	Vietnam Service Medal with bronze campaign star
Air Force Longevity Service Award with silver and bronze oak leaf clusters	Small Arms Expert Marksmanship Ribbon	Croix de Guerre with silver star (France)
Croix de Guerre with Palm (Belgium)	Republic of Korea Presidential Unit Citation	Republic of Vietnam Gallantry Cross
United Nations Service Medal for Korea	Vietnam Campaign Medal	Korean War Service Medal

=== Silver Star citation ===
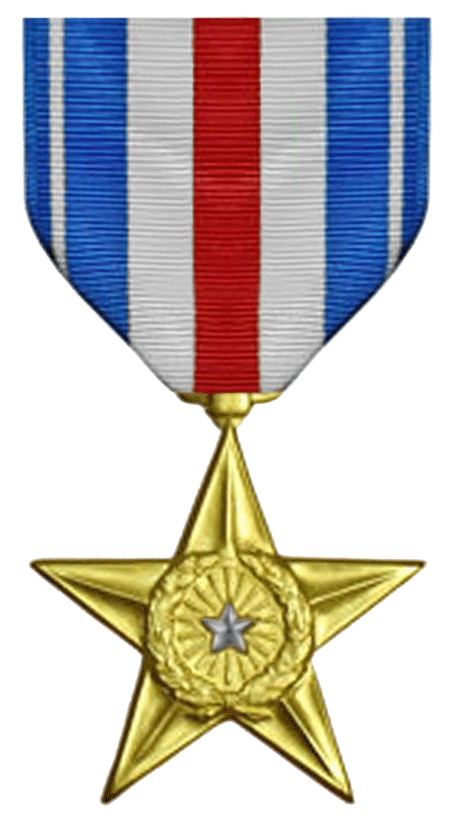

King, Benjamin H.
Major (Air Corps), U.S. Army Air Forces
368th Fighter Squadron, 359th Fighter Group, Eighth Air Force
Date of Action: September 11, 1944

Citation:

The President of the United States of America, authorized by Act of Congress July 9, 1918, takes pleasure in presenting the Silver Star to Major (Air Corps) Benjamin Hardin King, United States Army Air Forces, for gallantry in action over Eisleben, Germany, while flying a P-51 fighter, 368th Fighter Squadron, 359th Fighter Group, Eighth Air Force, on 11 September 1944. Major King was escorting heavy bombers to their target when more than fifty (50) enemy fighters made a determined interception attack. Observing approximately fifteen (15) fighters attacking the rear echelon of bombers, Major King, supported only by his wingman, went to their assistance. Ignoring the enemy's advantage in strength, he successfully destroyed two planes. He then chased a FW-190 down to tree top altitude, expended the last of his ammunition as the aircraft hit the ground and exploded. Now flying alone and without ammunition, he got on the tail of another enemy plane and gallantly made an unsuccessful attempt to drive him into the ground. The outstanding courage and superior combat skill displayed by Major King during this action were an inspiration to his fellow pilots.
