= Lambert (lunar crater) =

Crater on the Moon

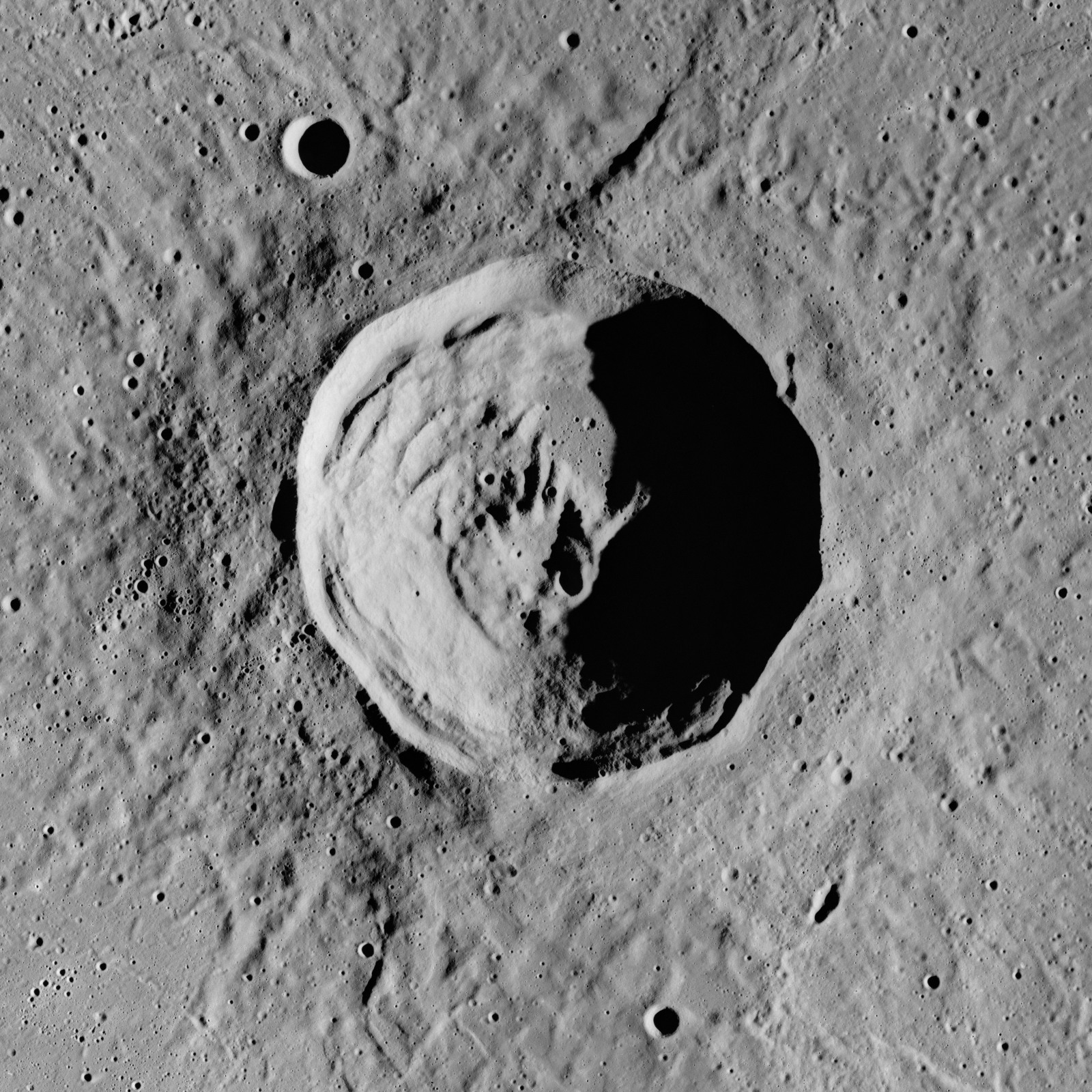
- Lambert from Apollo 15. NASA photo.
- Coordinates: 25.8°N 21.0°W
- Diameter: 30 km
- Depth: 2.6 km
- Colongitude: 21° at sunrise
- Formation: Eratosthenian
- Eponym: Johann Heinrich Lambert

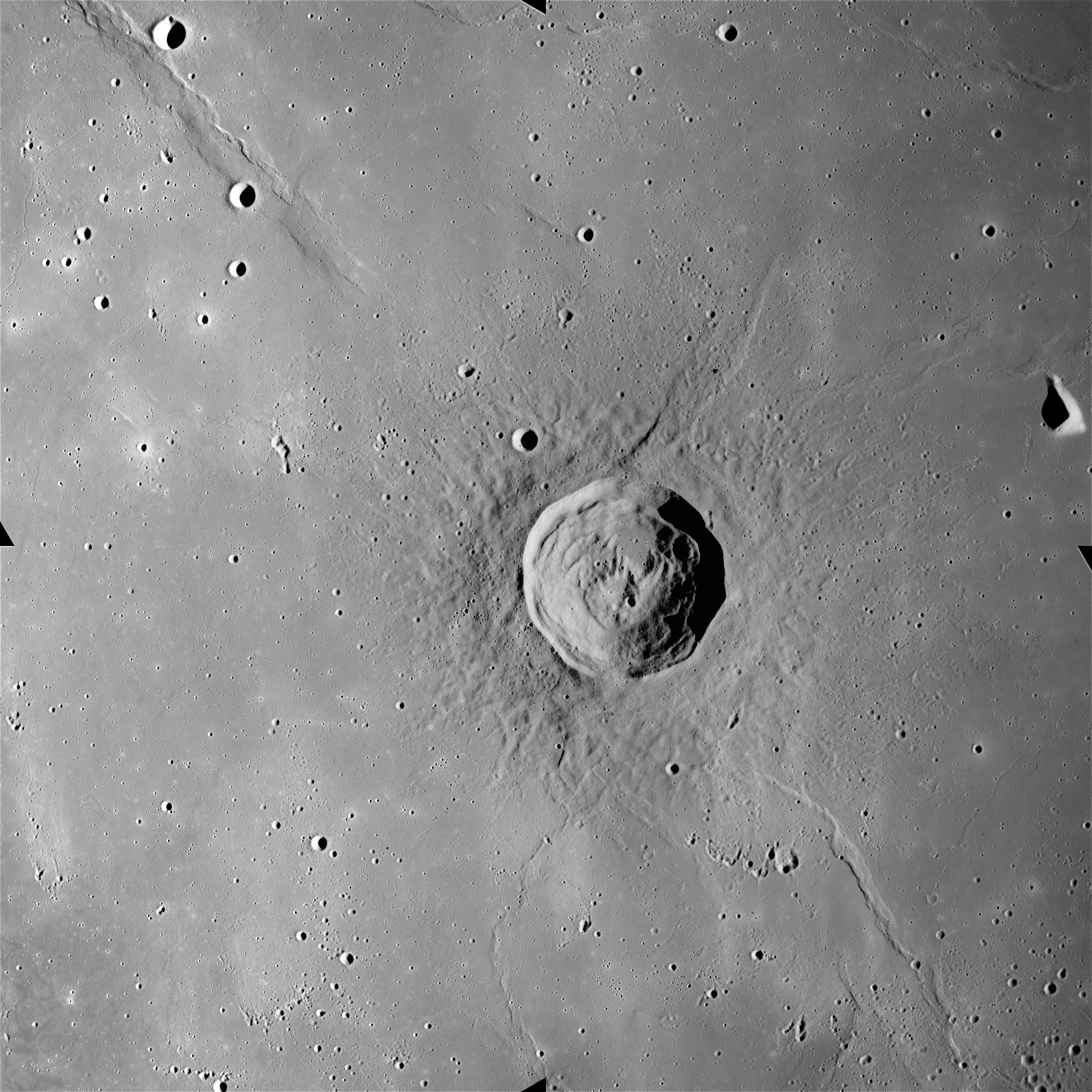
Lambert on a later orbit of Apollo 15. Most of Lambert R is visible as the circular structure south of Lambert. Hill Lambert gamma (Mons Undest) is visible near the right margin.

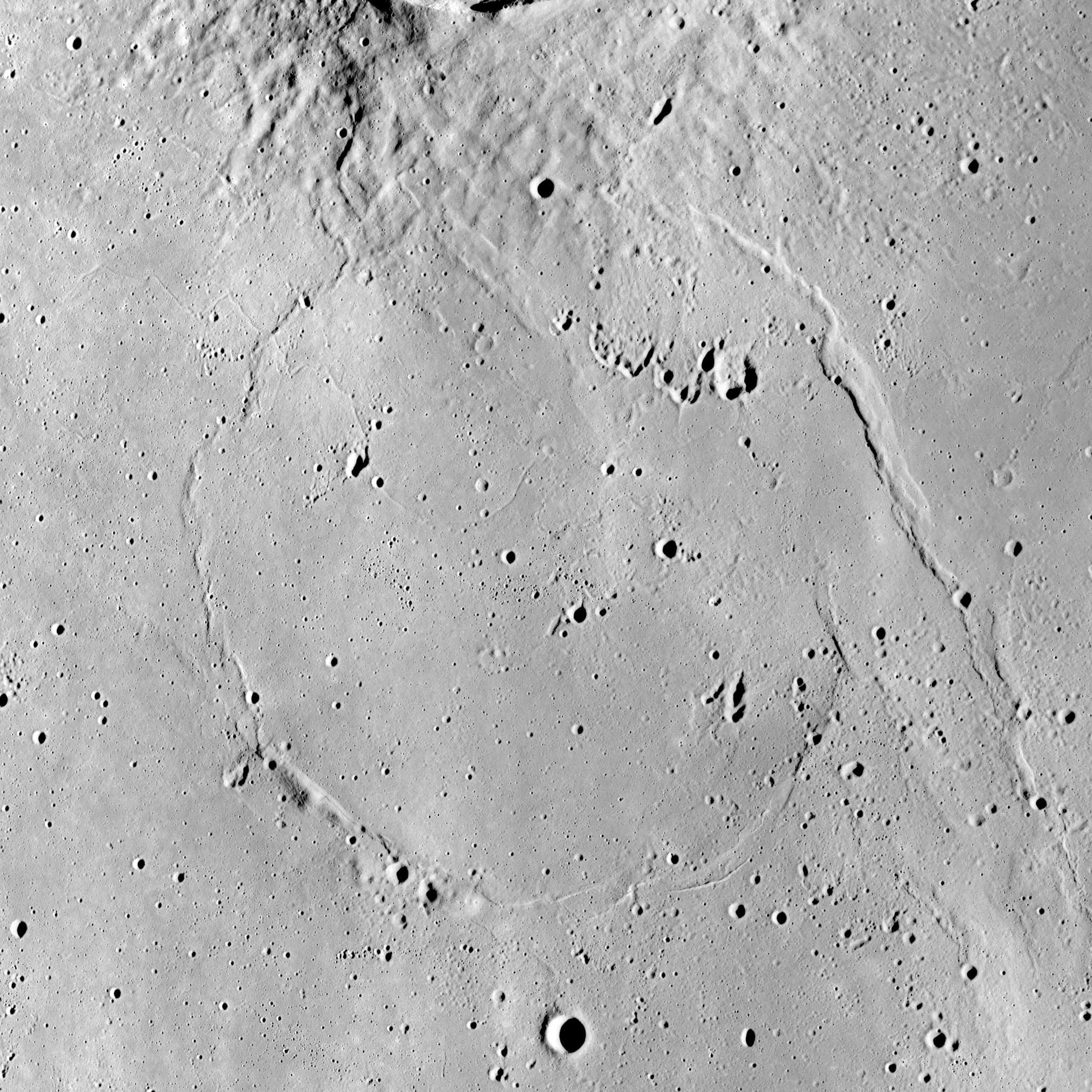
Ghost crater Lambert R (photo by Apollo 17).

Lambert is a lunar impact crater on the southern half of the Mare Imbrium basin. It was named after Swiss polymath Johann Heinrich Lambert. It lies to the west and somewhat south of the slightly larger crater Timocharis. To the south is the smaller Pytheas, and some distance to the west-southwest is Euler.

The crater is relatively easy to locate due to its isolated position on the mare. It has an outer rampart, terraced inner walls, and a rough interior that has an albedo comparable to its surroundings. Instead of a central peak, a small craterlet lies at the midpoint of the interior.

Just to the south of Lambert's ramparts is the lava-covered rim of Lambert R, a crater that is almost completely covered by the mare. The diameter of this ghost crater is larger than Lambert, but it is difficult to spot except when the Sun is at a very low angle, casting long shadows.

Lambert is a crater of Eratosthenian age.

== During full moon ==
Although Lambert is a pronounced crater, it is almost invisible during full moon. East-northeast of Lambert, a small triangle shaped hill which received the identification Lambert gamma (Lambert γ) shows up as a bright dot and is a useful tool to try to locate crater Lambert. Lambert gamma was called Mons Undest during the Apollo program. Somehow, a typographical error in the name Undest was unnoticed during the preparation of the Lunar Topographic Orthophotomaps (LTO). The correct name was Mons Undset, after Sigrid Undset. The curious triangle shaped bright appearance of Lambert gamma is also noticeable on the photographic version of chart LAC 40 (page 80) in The Clementine Atlas of the Moon (Ben Bussey / Paul D. Spudis).

== Satellite craters ==
By convention these features are identified on lunar maps by placing the letter on the side of the crater midpoint that is closest to Lambert.

Lambert	Coordinates	Diameter
A	26.46°N 21.49°W	3.7 km
B	24.34°N 20.13°W	3.9 km
R	23.88°N 20.66°W	55.7 km
T	28.47°N 20.29°W	3.7 km
W	24.49°N 22.66°W	2.3 km
