= Gentile Air Force Station =

Coordinates: 39°42′54″N 84°9′4″W

Gentile Air Force Station was a USAF installation in Kettering, Ohio, named for World War II fighter ace Don Gentile and closed in 1997. Gentile AFS was the site of the Defense Electronics Supply Center (merged with the Defense Construction Supply Center in Columbus to form the Defense Supply Center, Columbus) and its Defense Automatic Addressing System Center. In 1994, Gentile AFS became a Defense Finance and Accounting Service Center facility for the Air Force. After Gentile's closure, the town of Kettering converted the base property into Kettering Business Park.

The public artwork Bee Ambitious (2019) by Jes McMillan in the Haverstick neighborhood of Kettering, Ohio was inspired by the aviation heritage of this station.

By June 2020, City of Kettering was planning to create a 19-acre park at the site of Gentile Air Force Station. As of fall of 2023 the development began and Gentile Nature Park opened June 8, 2024.

== Sources ==
- GlobalSecurity.org: http://www.globalsecurity.org/military/facility/gentile.htm
- Federal Register / Vol. 61, No. 105 / Thursday, May 30, 1996 / Notices, page 27054, "Record of Decision (ROD) for the Disposal and Reuse of Gentile Air Force Station (AFS), Ohio"*
