= 336th Fighter Squadron =

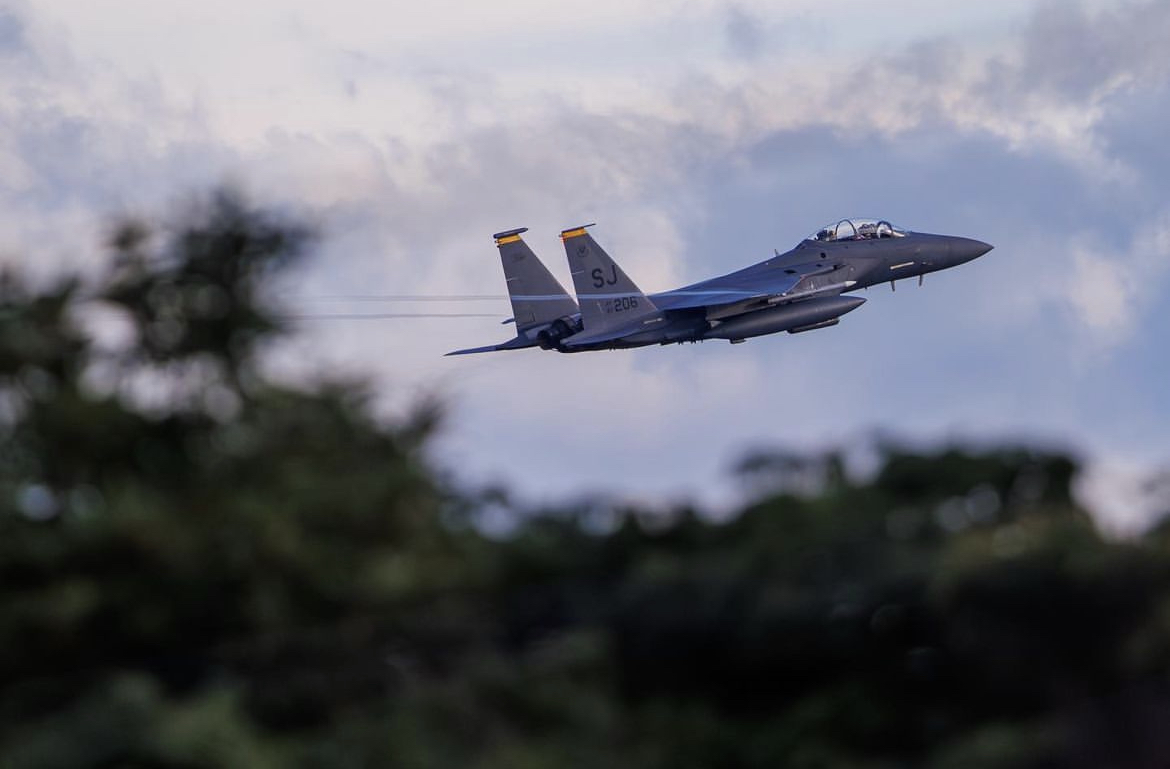
- 336th Fighter Squadron F-15E Departing Tsuiki Air Base 2023
- Active: 22 August 1942 – 10 November 1945; 9 September 1946 – present
- Country: United States
- Branch: United States Air Force
- Type: Fighter
- Role: Air Interdiction
- Size: 156 Cogs (as of February 2026)
- Part of: Air Combat Command
- Nickname: Rocketeers
- Motto: WFFFFR
- Colors: Yellow
- Equipment: F-15E Strike Eagle
- Engagements: World War II; Korean War; Vietnam War; Desert Storm; Operation Northern Watch; Operation Southern Watch; Operation Iraqi Freedom; Operation Enduring Freedom; Operation Inherent Resolve; Operation Cope India; Operation Iron Riptide

Commanders
- Current commander: LtCol Mitchell "FORGE" Fossum
- Notable commanders: Steven L. "Steep" Turner; Carroll W. McColpin; Don Gentile; Willard W. Millikan; Benjamin H. King

Insignia
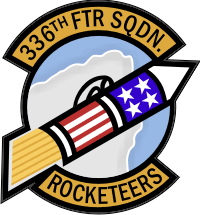
- 336th Fighter Squadron emblem (Approved 15 October 1947)
- Squadron code: SC (1967–1974); SJ (1974–present)

The 336th Fighter Squadron (336th FS), nicknamed the Rocketeers, is a United States Air Force unit. It is assigned to the 4th Operations Group and stationed at Seymour Johnson Air Force Base, North Carolina.

The 336th was constituted on 22 August 1942 as an incorporation of the Royal Air Force No. 133 Squadron into the United States Army Air Forces' VIII Fighter Command. No. 133 Squadron was one of three RAF Eagle Squadrons composed of American volunteer pilots who enlisted in the RAF and fought in World War II prior to the United States' entry into the war.

At the height of conversion training, the 4th TFW was one of the first units tasked to react to Iraq's invasion of Kuwait in August 1990. The 335th and 336th Tactical Fighter Squadrons and support personnel deployed to Saudi Arabia, beginning in August 1990. The combat record of the 4th TFW in Saudi Arabia was exceptional, with the 336th TFS flying 1,088 combat missions during Operation Desert Storm. The unit dropped more than six-million pounds of bombs on Scud missile sites, bridges and airfields. Most of the missions were flown at night.

== Overview ==
The "Rocketeers" fly the McDonnell-Douglas (now Boeing) F-15E Strike Eagle. It was the first operational F-15E squadron in the Air Force. Its aircraft are identified by the "SJ" tail code and yellow fin flash.

Currently the squadron provides worldwide deployable aircraft and personnel capable of executing combat missions in support of worldwide Aerospace Expeditionary Force deployments to combat areas as part of the global war on terrorism. To date, the 336th have destroyed 459 enemy aircraft including the 4th Fighter Wing's sole MiG kill in Vietnam.

== History ==
=== World War II ===
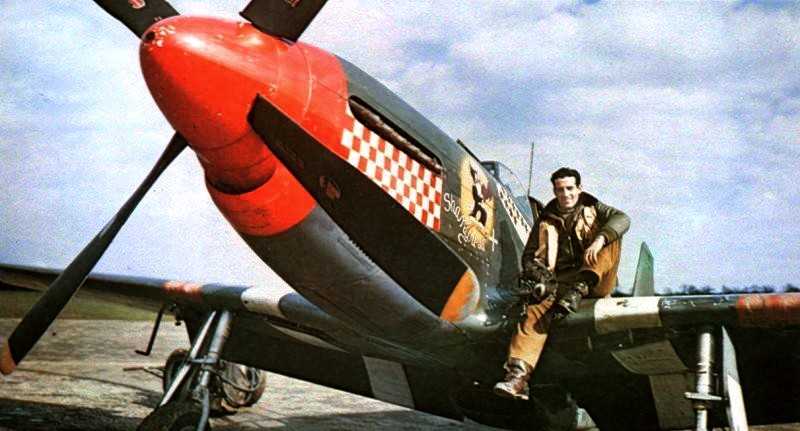
Don Gentile's P-51B "Shangri La"

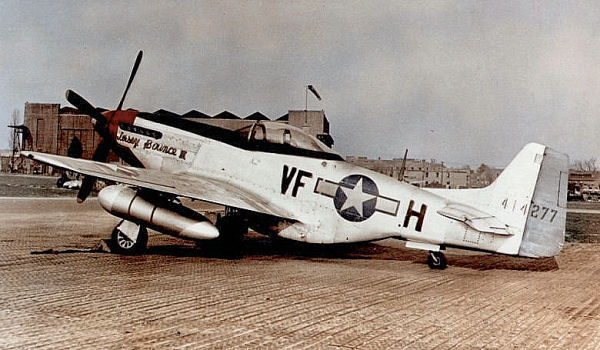
P-51D of the 336th Fighter Squadron (Note: Aircraft is P-51D-10-NA Mustang serial 44-14277. This aircraft was shot down over Prague 16 April 1945 and the pilot was taken Prisoner of War.)

On 23 September 1942 the 4th Fighter Group moved to its initial airfield at RAF Debden; however, the 336th moved to a satellite field at RAF Great Sampford. They conducted operations from there until rejoining the group at Debden on 30 October 1942.

Fighter aircraft escorted first bombing raid over Berlin, March 1944. On 21 June 1944, escorted bombers in the first shuttle bombing mission from England to Russia. Received Distinguished Unit Citation (DUC) for destroying enemy aircraft and attacking air bases in France, 5 March – 24 April 1944.

=== Cold War ===
In 1946 trained in jet aircraft; participated in air shows around the US; began night flying in late 1947.

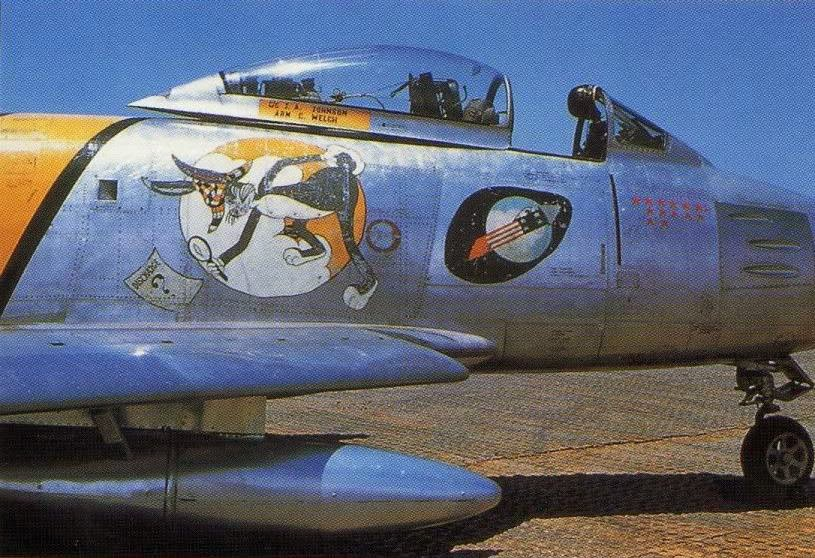
Ace Robbie Risner's F-86 1953 showing the "Rocketeers' logo

Combat in Korea, December 1950 – July 1953. Received second and third DUCs for combat in Korean War, 22 April – 8 July 1951 and 9 July – 27 November 1951.

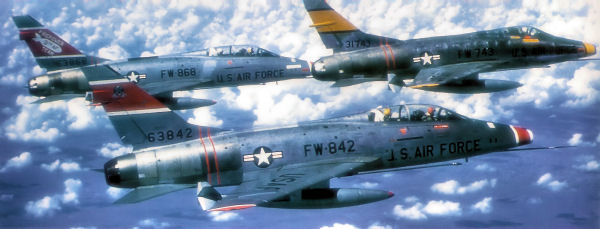
336th TFS F-100C of the (yellow) with two 333d TFS F-100F (red) (Note: Aircraft is North American F-100C-1-NA Super Sabre, serial 53-1743. F-100F-10-NA Super Sabres are serials 56-3868 and 56-3842. 56-3842 was sold to Denmark in 1974, later being sold on the civilian marketplace, being registered as N417FS in 1982.)

Deployed to Florida in October 1962 during Cuban missile crisis.

From January–June 1968, deployed to Korea; tasked with operations associated with USS Pueblo incident. Combat in Southeast Asia, April–September 1972 and March 1973.

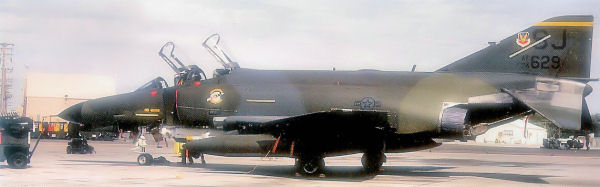
336th TFS F-4E in 1984. (Note: Aircraft is F-4E-61-MC Phantom serial 74-1629.)

During the 1980s, trained in combat readiness in order to maintain worldwide commitment and air-to-air mission capability. Deployed to Europe under dual-based mission concept in support of NATO objectives, 1978–1985.

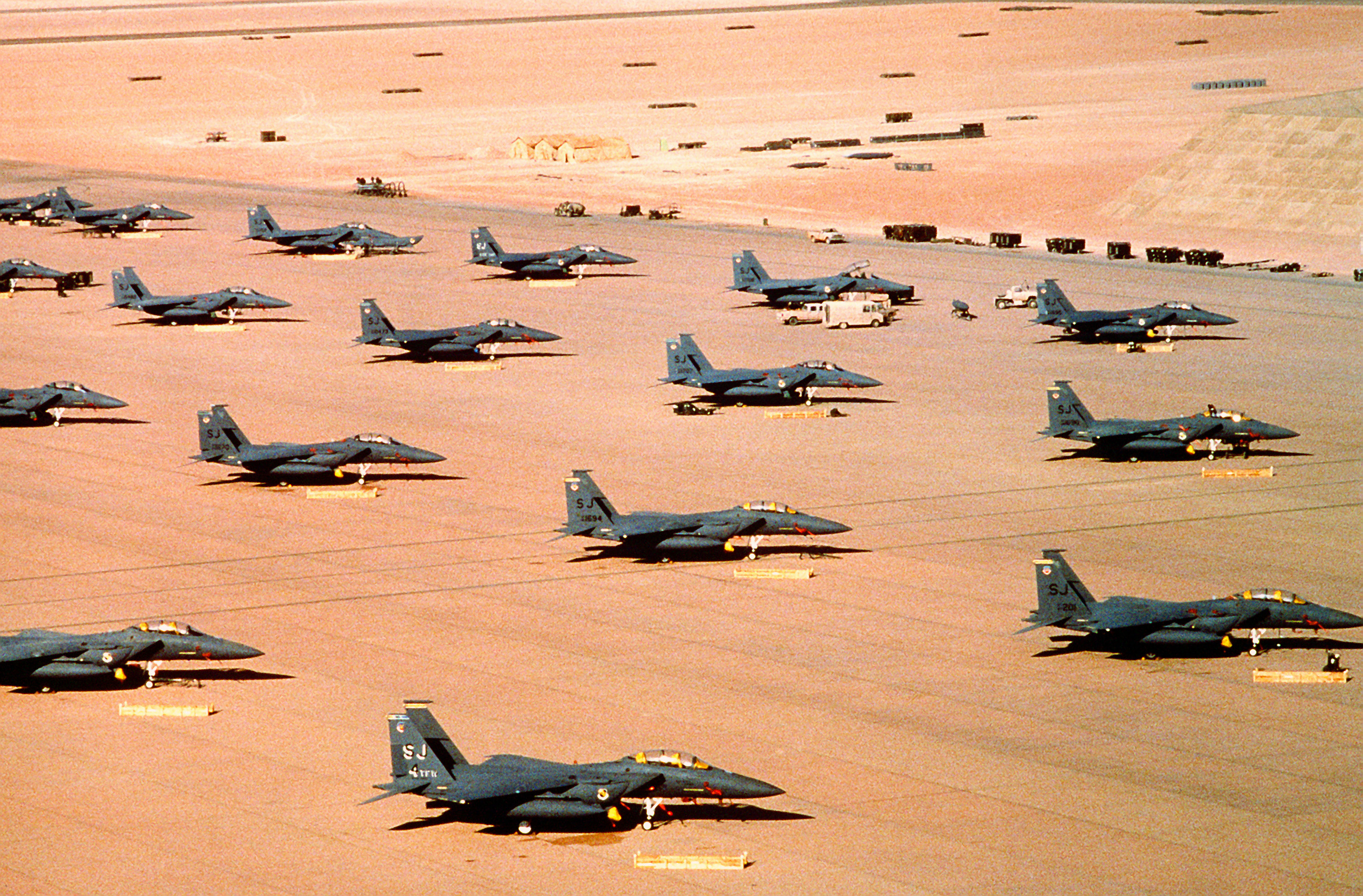
4th FW F-15Es in Southwest Asia in 1992.

Participated in initial attack on Iraq, 17 January 1991. During 1990–1994, shared quarterly rotation duties to Southwest Asia with 334th and 335th Fighter Squadrons.

=== Modern Era ===
Since 1991, trained as combat ready fighter squadron prepared for rapid worldwide deployment of fighter aircraft to accomplish air-to-ground, air-to-air, strategic attack and deep interdiction missions.

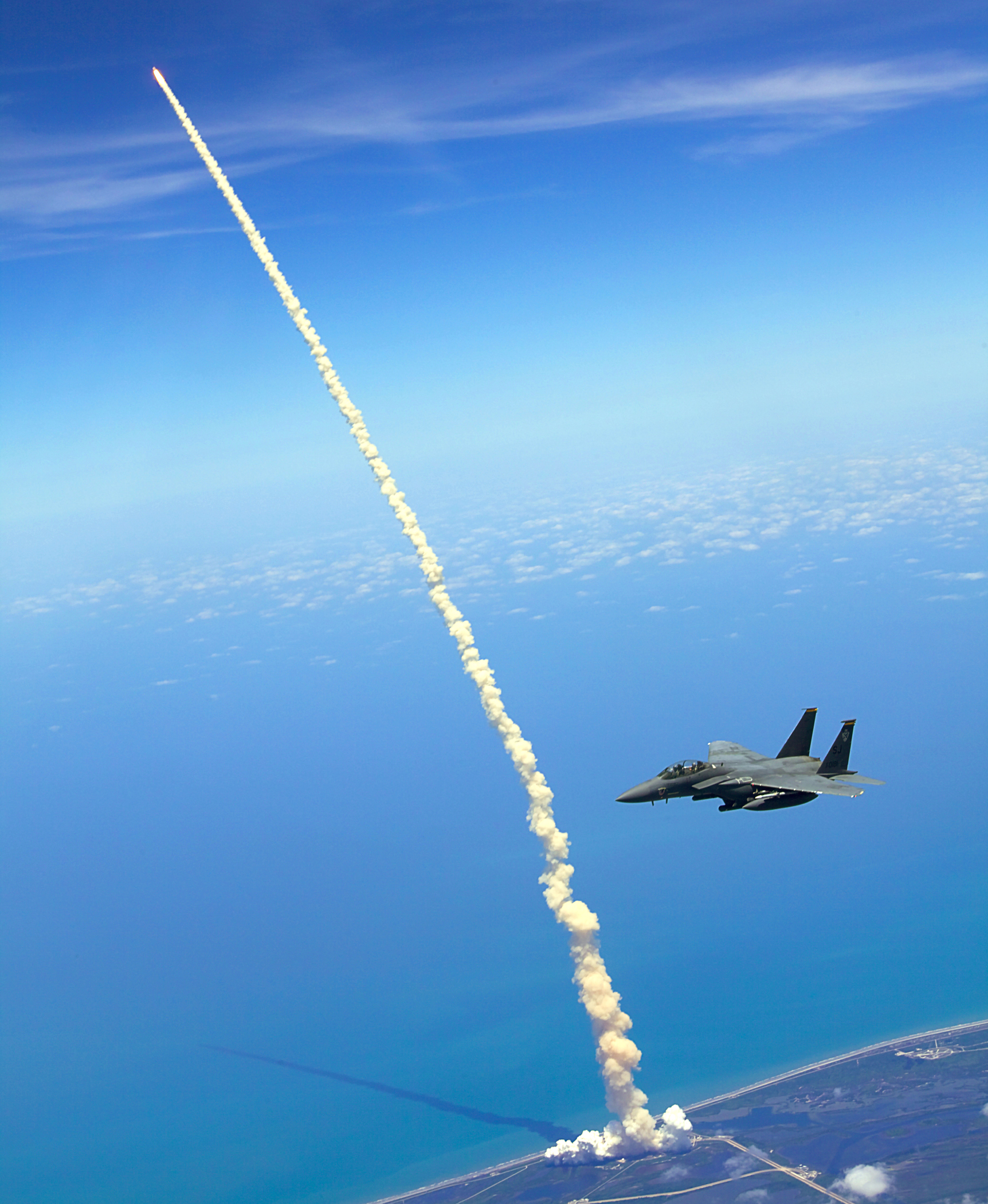
336th F-15E patrols over Florida as the Space Shuttle Atlantis launches in the background

Deployed to combat areas in Middle East as part of Global War on Terrorism, 2001–present.

On 18 July 2009, F-15E serial 90-231 from the 336th Fighter Squadron crashed in eastern Afghanistan, killing the two-man crew, Captain Mark R. McDowell and Captain Thomas J. Gramith. The US military reported that the jet was not downed by enemy action.

Air Combat Command officials announced a stand down and reallocation of flying hours for the rest of the fiscal year 2013 due to mandatory budget cuts. The across-the board spending cuts, called sequestration, took effect 1 March when Congress failed to agree on a deficit-reduction plan. Squadrons either stood down on a rotating basis or kept combat ready or at a reduced readiness level called "basic mission capable" for part or all of the remaining months in fiscal 2013. This affected the 336th Fighter Squadron with a stand-down grounding from 9 April-30 September 2013.

In October 2014, the Rocketeers deployed to the Middle East for Operation Inherent Resolve, striking ISIL targets in Iraq and Syria.

In October 2021, the Rocketeers deployed to Larissa Air Base, Greece, to participate in Exercise Castle Forge. While deployed to EUCOM in 2021–2022, the Rocketeers became the first American unit ever to execute the NATO Enhanced Air Policing Mission in Romania and Estonia. Tasked with defending NATO's eastern flank during Russia's Invasion of Ukraine, the 336th FS provided continual armed over watch while simultaneously supporting non-combatant evacuations across the Ukrainian-Polish border.

In 2023, the Rocketeers were again called upon, this time to support a free and open Indo-Pacific region. During their deployment to Kadena AB, Japan, the 336th FS flew 913 sorties, 22 higher headquarter taskings, eight Joint and Coalition missions, integrated with partner nations during Operations Iron Riptide, Southern Beach, and participated in Cope India 2023 at the direction of the White House. In addition, the Rocketeers sat 882 hours of Distant Sea Operations alert, intercepting Russian and People’s Republic of China bomber patrols, as well as PRC Naval Fighters operating from a forward deployed Naval Carrier Strike Group.

== The Cog ==
The Cog Wheel symbol has been adopted by the Rocketeers as an official name for its newest air crew members. The history of its origin is shrouded in lore, however the gist of it begins with a disgruntled operations officer. Said operations officer was unsatisfied with the performance of the young aviators who were at home, awaiting final spin-up training, while the rest of the squadron was deployed. The young Rocketeers were berated via email for their lack of discipline, lack of motivation, and lack of pride. Eventually name calling occurred, with the aviators being referred to as 'Cannon-Fodder', 'Snarky', and ultimately a 'Cog in the machine'.

Since then the pilots and WSOs of the 336th who have not received a call sign are simply referred to as 'Cog'. For example, if a more senior member of the squadron needed a person for a task such as cleaning, restocking the squadron bar, hanging up pictures, or any other menial task, that person would simply say "I NEED A COG!" and 6-9 highly motivated Cogs would rush to help. If a specific Cog was required, then they would be summoned by their unique Cog Number e.g. "Cog 69" if you wanted the 69th Cog to report to you.

Although initially intended as a demeaning term to new aircrew, the Cog name now symbolically represents rising up together, against all oppression, foreign and domestic. Whereas one Cog is meaningless and weak, multiple Cogs together are strong and rigid. A Cog receiving his/her call sign is also a symbolic transition to an aviator being strong enough to be on their own and potentially lead a formation of aircraft.

Today it is common for a Cog to get a tattoo of a cog wheel, symbolizing their loyalty to the cause. As of December 2025, there have been 154 Cogs.

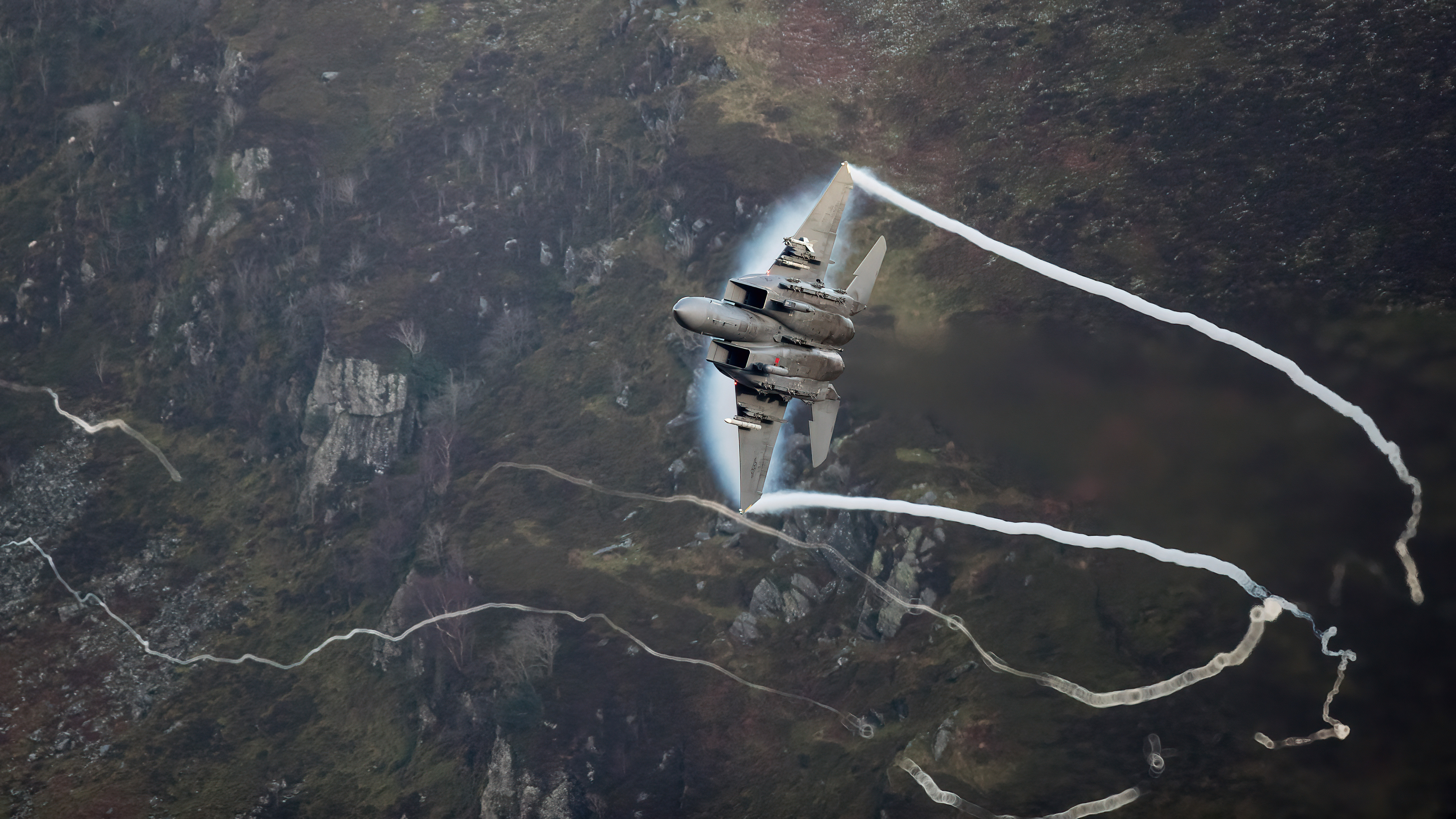
Cogs maneuvering a 336th F-15E through the Mach Loop

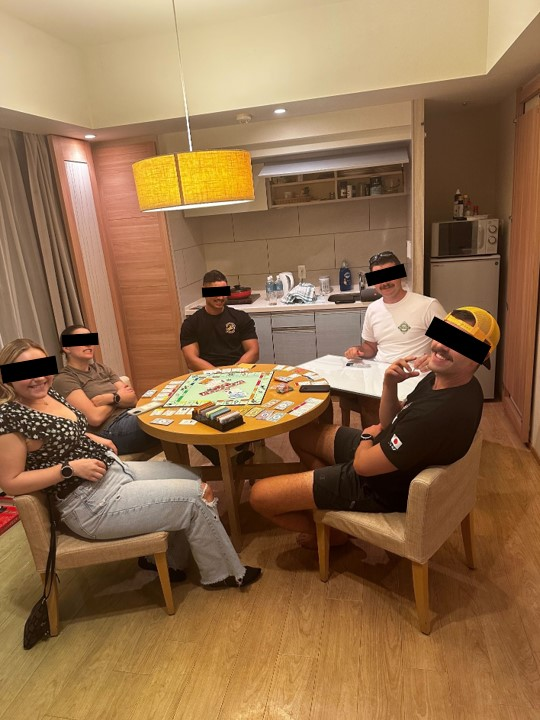
Cogs Playing Monopoly at an Undisclosed Location, 2023

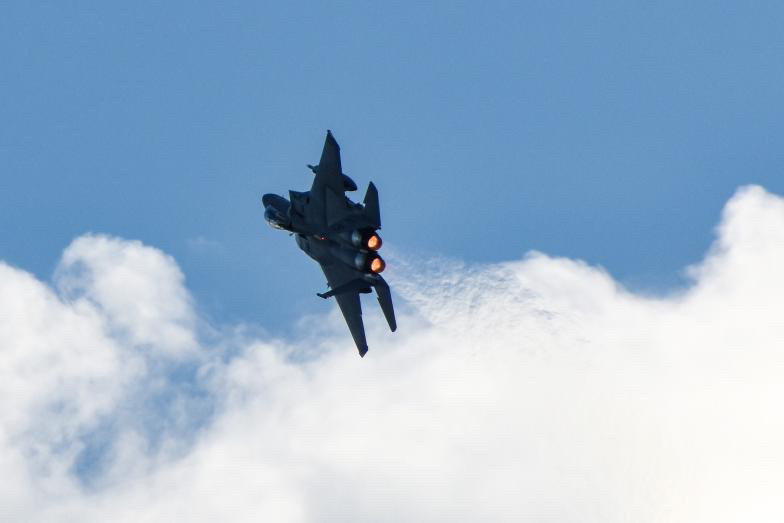
Cogs in a Rocketeers F-15E executing a closed pull up at Tsuiki Air Base

== Lineage ==
- Constituted as the 336th Fighter Squadron on 22 August 1942

Activated on 12 September 1942
Redesignated 336th Fighter Squadron, Single Engine on 20 August 1943
Inactivated on 10 November 1945

- Activated on 9 September 1946

Redesignated 336th Fighter Squadron, Jet Propelled on 23 April 1947
Redesignated 336th Fighter Squadron, Jet on 14 June 1948
Redesignated 336th Fighter-Interceptor Squadron on 20 January 1950
Redesignated 336th Fighter-Bomber Squadron on 8 March 1955
Redesignated 336th Fighter-Day Squadron on 25 April 1956
Redesignated 336th Tactical Fighter Squadron on 1 July 1958
Redesignated 336th Fighter Squadron on 1 November 1991 (Note: When the squadron is the primary force provider to a deployed expeditionary unit, that unit is designated the 336th Expeditionary Fighter Squadron, a provisional unit.)

=== Assignments ===
- 4th Fighter Group, 12 September 1942 – 10 November 1945
- 4th Fighter Group (later 4th Fighter-Interceptor Group, 4th Fighter-Bomber Group, 4th Fighter-Day Group), 9 September 1946

Attached to 49th Fighter-Bomber Wing, 19 November 1954; 18th Fighter-Bomber Wing, 7 August 1956; 313th Air Division, after 1 February 1957

- 4th Fighter-Day Wing (later 4th Tactical Fighter Wing, 4th Wing), 8 December 1957

Attached to 65th Air Division, 12 August 1963 – 7 January 1964; Seventeenth Air Force, 25 May–30 August 1965; 8th Tactical Fighter Wing, 12 April–30 September 1972 and 9 March–7 September 1973; 314th Air Division, 22 March–17 April 1977; 86th Tactical Fighter Wing, 11 September–13 October 1978, 31 August–1 October 1979, 26 August–26 September 1980, 5 September–3 October 1983 and 26 August–26 September 1985; 4th Tactical Fighter Wing (Deployed), 9 August–20 December 1990; 4th Tactical Fighter Wing Provisional, 20 December 1990 – c. 13 March 1991

- 4th Operations Group, 22 April 1991 – present

=== Stations ===
- RAF Bushey Hall (AAF-341), England, 12 September 1942
- RAF Debden (AAF-356), England, 29 September 1942
- RAF Steeple Morden (AAF-122), England, c. 23 July–4 November 1945
- Camp Kilmer, New Jersey, 9–10 November 1945
- Selfridge Field, Michigan, 9 September 1946
- Andrews Field (later Andrews Air Force Base), Maryland, 26 March 1947
- Langley Air Force Base, Virginia, 2 May 1949
- Dover Air Force Base, Delaware, 13 August–11 November 1950
- Johnson Air Base, Japan, 13 December 1950
- Taegu Air Base (K-2), South Korea, 15 March 1951
- Suwon Air Base (K-13), South Korea, c. 6 April 1951
- Johnson Air Base, Japan, 27 June 1951
- Kimpo Air Base (K-14), South Korea, 20 September 1951
- Misawa Air Base, Japan, 19 November 1954
- Kadena Air Base, Okinawa, 7 August 1956
- Seymour Johnson Air Force Base, North Carolina, 8 December 1957 – present

Deployed to McCoy Air Force Base, Florida, 21 October–29 November 1962; Moron Air Base, Spain, 12 August 1963 – 7 January 1964; Incirlik Air Base, Turkey, 25 May–30 August 1965; Ubon Royal Thai Air Force Base, Thailand, 12 April–30 September 1972 and 9 March–7 September 1973; Suwon Air Base, South Korea, 25 March–17 April 1977; Ramstein Air Base, West Germany, 11 September–13 October 1978, 31 August–1 October 1979, 26 August–26 September 1980, 5 September–3 October 1983, and 26 August–26 September 1985; Seeb International Airport, Thumrait Oman, 9 August 1990; Al Karj Air Base, Saudi Arabia, 18 December 1990-c. 13 March 1991

=== Aircraft ===
Aircraft operated include:

- Supermarine Spitfire Mk.Vb (Sept 42–1 Apr 1943)
- Republic P-47C Thunderbolt (10 Mar 1943–Feb 1944)
- Republic P-47D Thunderbolt (June 1943–Feb 1944; 1947)
- North American P-51B Mustang (25 Feb 1944–1945)
- North American P-51D Mustang (June 1944 – 1945)
- North American P-51K Mustang (Dec 1944–1945)
- Lockheed F-80 Shooting Star (1947–1949)
- North American F-86 Sabre (1949–1958)
- North American F-100C Super Sabre (Dec 1957–1960)
- Republic F-105 Thunderchief (1959–1967)
- McDonnell Douglas F-4D Phantom II (1967–1970)
- McDonnell Douglas F-4E Phantom II (1970–1988)
- McDonnell Douglas F-15E Strike Eagle (1988–present)

=== Notable squadron members ===
- Vermont Garrison
- Don Gentile
- John T. Godfrey
- James Robinson Risner

=== Emblems ===
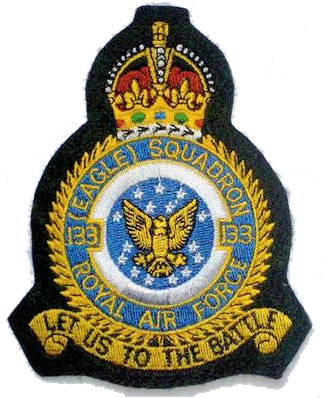
133 Eagle Squadron, RAF, 1940

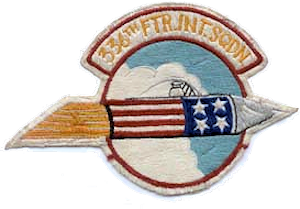
336th Fighter-Interceptor Squadron

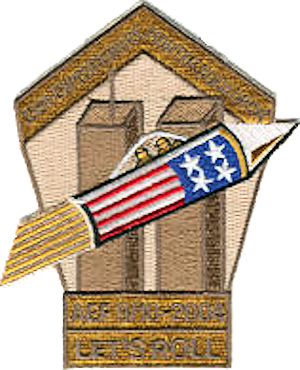
336th Expeditionary Fighter Squadron

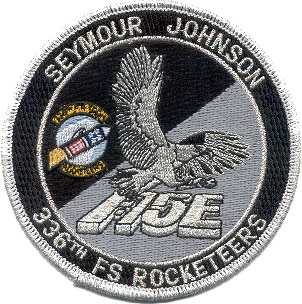
