= Damon and Pythias =

Ancient Greek legend

The story of Damon (/ˈdeɪmən/; Ancient Greek: Δάμων, Damōn) and Pythias (/ˈpɪθiəs/; Πυθίας or Φιντίας; or Phintias, /ˈfɪntiəs/) is a legend in Greek historic writings illustrating the Pythagorean ideal of friendship. Pythias is accused of and charged with plotting against the tyrannical Dionysius I of Syracuse. Pythias is sentenced to death, but requests of Dionysius to first be allowed to settle his affairs. Dionysius agrees, on the condition that Pythias' friend, Damon, be held hostage and, should Pythias not return, be executed in his stead. When Pythias returns, Dionysius, amazed by the love and trust in their friendship, frees them both.

== Greek legend ==
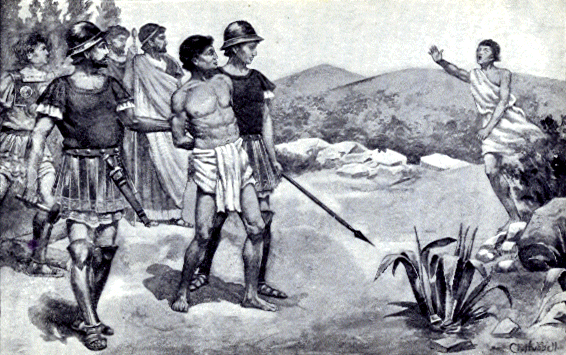
Damon and Pythias pictured in a book by H. A. Guerber

As told by Aristoxenus, and after him Cicero (De Offic. 3.45), Diodorus Siculus (10.4), and others, Pythias and his friend Damon, both followers of the philosopher Pythagoras, traveled to Syracuse during the reign of the tyrant Dionysius I (r. 405–367 BC). Pythias was accused of plotting against the tyrant and sentenced to death.

Accepting his sentence, Pythias asked to be allowed to return home one last time to settle his affairs and bid his family farewell. Not wanting to be taken for a fool, the king refused, believing that, once released, Pythias would flee and never return. Damon offered himself as a hostage in Pythias' absence, and when the king insisted that, should Pythias not return by an appointed time, Damon would be executed in his stead, Damon agreed and Pythias was released.

Dionysius was convinced that Pythias would never return, and as the day Pythias promised to return came and went, he called for Damon's execution—but just as the executioner was about to kill Damon, Pythias returned.

Apologizing to his friend for the delay, Pythias explained that on the passage back to Syracuse, pirates had captured his ship and had thrown him overboard, but that he had swum to shore and made his way back to Syracuse as quickly as possible, arriving just in time to save his friend.

So astonished by and pleased with their friendship, Dionysius pardoned both men. It was also said that the tyrant then sought to befriend the two, but was rebuffed.

Another version says that it was a test planned by the king and his courtiers. The Pythagoreans were renowned for their moral strength and superiority, but some Syracusan courtiers argued the claim was false, and others disagreed, so with their king they devised a test—a crisis that would show whether two Pythagoreans lived up to that reputation.

== Works based on the legend ==
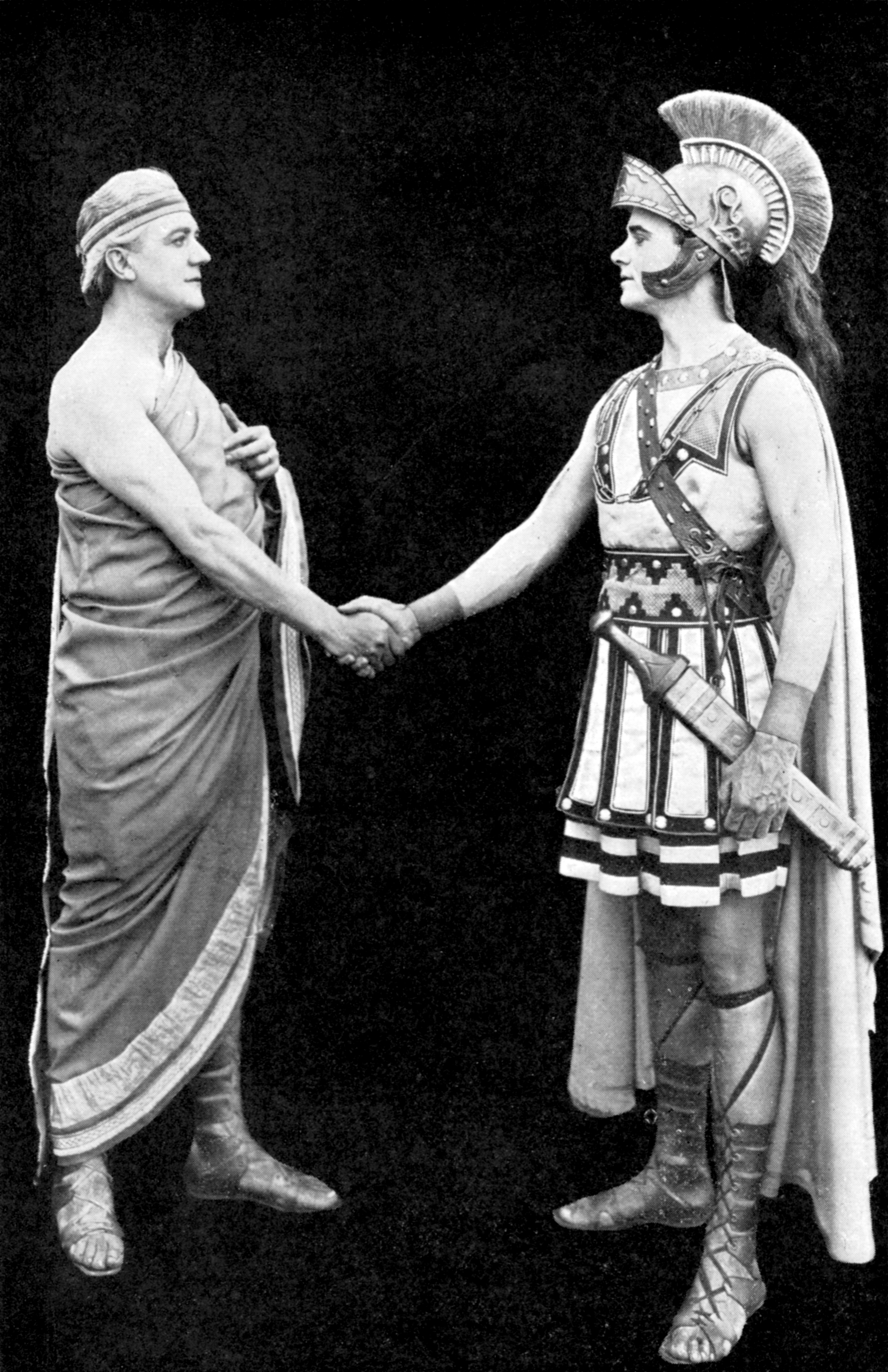
Still from Universal's film Damon and Pythias (1914)

- In 1564, the material was made into a tragicomic play by the English poet Richard Edwardes (Damon and Pythias).
- The best-known modern treatment of the legend is the German ballad Die Bürgschaft, written in 1799 by Friedrich Schiller, based on the Gesta Romanorum version. (In this work, Damon is sentenced to death, not Pythias.)
- In 1821, the Irish poet John Banim wrote a play based on the legend (Damon and Pythias). Familiarity with this play led Justus H. Rathbone to found the fraternal order Knights of Pythias.
- There is a chapter in Little Men by Louisa May Alcott called "Damon and Pythias" in which Nat is suspected of stealing money from Tommy and is shunned by the other boys, until Dan takes the blame for the crime. In the end, both are absolved from the crime when it is discovered that Jack was the actual thief and Dan only confessed because he knew could withstand the disgrace of ostracism better than sensitive Nat.
- In 1914 in the United States, Universal Pictures produced and released the film Damon and Pythias starring William Worthington and Herbert Rawlinson in the title roles.
- In 1915, the book The Story of Damon and Pythias by Albert Payson Terhune was published. It was "adapted and illustrated from the photo-play conceived and produced by The Universal Film Manufacturing Company", referring to the 1914 film starring William Worthington and Herbert Rawlinson. This book, like the German ballad, casts Damon as the condemned and the one who must return in time to save Pythias.
- In 1925, William Faulkner published Damon and Pythias Unlimited in the New Orleans Double Dealer, one of several "sketches" he wrote for the paper when he moved there.
- In Japan, the 1940 short story "Run, Melos!" by Osamu Dazai and an earlier nursery tale by Miekichi Suzuki are based on the legend, as is a 1992 anime produced by Toei Company, Ltd.
- The short story "Pythias" by Frederik Pohl, published in 1955, entwines the mythic elements with modern political and psychokinetic concerns.
- The film The Delicate Delinquent (1957) features characters "Mike Damon" (Darren McGavin, but imagined for Dean Martin) and "Sidney Pythias" (Jerry Lewis). As released, the film only vaguely resembles the legend — Pythias avoids jail — but intends instead to be a testament to the Martin and Lewis friendship.
- In a 1959 Leave It to Beaver episode, Beaver's father relates the Damon and Pythias story and Beaver donates his homework to friend Larry to prove their friendship. Larry confesses moments before Beaver loses a week of recesses.
- The 1962 MGM film Damon and Pythias remains true to the ancient story; it stars Guy Williams as Damon and Don Burnett as Pythias.
- The 1966 adventure film Adventure in Kigan Castle, which was adapted loosely from "Run, Melos!", has Osumi (Toshiro Mifune), a soldier of fortune, promise to deliver holy manuscripts from Gandhara while Ensai, a monk who freed him from slavery at the beginning of the film, offers to be executed in his place. Osumi succeeds and the king calls off the execution when he sees how selfless the man is.
- The story is reproduced in a 1999 episode titled "Damon and Pythias" of the animated series Mythic Warriors: Guardians of the Legend.
- The DreamWorks animated film Sinbad: Legend of the Seven Seas (2003) features the title character going on a journey to find a treasure, while his best friend remains behind in Syracuse to be executed in his place should he fail to return; he comes back and both are saved.

== Idiomatic use ==
"Damon and Pythias" came to be an idiomatic expression for "true friendship."

- Denis Diderot's short story, "The Two Friends from Bourbonne" (1770), begins: "There used to be two men here who might be called the Damon and Pythias of Bourbonne."
- In The Small House at Allington (1864) by Anthony Trollope, the Countess De Courcy teases the young Adolphus Crosbie for a long stay in the country with his friend Bernard Dale by remarking, "Quite a case of Damon and Pythias."
- The canines Bummer and Lazarus were eulogized as "the Damon and Pythias of San Francisco" upon Bummer's death in 1865.
- In Robert Louis Stevenson's novella Strange Case of Dr Jekyll and Mr Hyde, Henry Jekyll's two oldest friends, Dr. Lanyon and Mr. Utterson (a lawyer), have an exchange while discussing Dr. Jekyll's apparent self-imposed isolation. In the discussion (below), the use of the Damon-and-Pythias idiom would seem to indicate that, whether the difference was on a point of science or something else, it was not "only" some trivial difference:

...said Utterson. "I thought you had a common bond of interest".

"We had", was the reply. "But it is more than ten years since Henry Jekyll became too fanciful for me. He began to go wrong, wrong in the mind... Such unscientific balderdash", said the doctor, flushing suddenly purple, "would have estranged Damon and Pythias".

This little spirit of temper was somewhat of a relief to Mr. Utterson. "They have only differed on some point of science", he thought...

- Chapter Two (titled "Damon and Pythias") of Gustave Flaubert's 1869 novel Sentimental Education tells of the friendship of Frederick Moreau and Charles Deslauriers.
- The 1889 novel A Marriage Below Zero by Alfred J. Cohen (pen name: Alan Dale) has a young gay couple continually referring to themselves as Damon and Pythias. Soon the upscale social world that they try pass in begins to refer to them with the same term, but as a derogatory codeword for 'gay couple.'
- Shakespeare's Hamlet addresses his close friend Horatio as "O Damon dear."
- In the novel Little Men by Louisa M. Alcott (1871), Chapter 14 is entitled "Damon and Pythias". This is a reference to two of the characters, Nat and Dan. Early in the book, Nat is responsible for introducing Dan to the school which is the setting of the novel. Later, when Nat is falsely accused of theft, Dan stands by him and then later takes responsibility for the theft himself, saying that he could bear the mistrust and anger of the other boys more easily than his weaker friend. In fact, neither boy is guilty, and they are later cleared of involvement.
- Two clerks arrested for drunk and disorderly conduct in Charles Dickens's story "Making a Night of It" (in Sketches by Boz) allude to Damon and Pythias.
- In A Bell for Adano, by John Hersey, Captain Purvis's and Mayor Joppolo's friendship is compared to the friendship of Damon and Pythias because they dated sisters.
- In 1895, Jack London used Damon and Pythias as the nicknames of the two main characters in "Who Believes in Ghosts!"
- In the 1940 movie The Philadelphia Story, Tracy Lord (Katharine Hepburn) remarks, with great irony, that C. K. Dexter Haven (Cary Grant) and George Kittredge (John Howard) are just like Damon and Pythias.
- During World War II, P-51 fighter pilots Major Dominic Salvatore Gentile (1920–1951) and his wingman Captain John T. Godfrey (1922–1958), both of the 4th Fighter Group, were referred to as "Damon and Pythias". This remarkable team destroyed over 50 German aircraft.
- In the 1950 Bowery Boys movie Blonde Dynamite, the boys establish a male escort service out of their foil Louie's ice cream parlor while they have conveniently sent him to Coney Island on vacation; Slip Mahoney (Leo Gorcey) tells the other boys to "Let Damon and Pythias fight it out!"—meaning to let Sach (Huntz Hall) and Whitey (Billy Benedict) fight to see which would be included in a group date with a bevy of femmes fatale.
- Jim Kjelgaard's 1957 novel Double Challenge names two trophy whitetail bucks as Damon and Pythias in the rurals of Pennsylvania.
- In season 2, episode 32 (aired May 7, 1959) of Leave It to Beaver, "Friendship", Ward Cleaver uses it as a reference to his sons, due to Beaver having an argument with his friend Larry Mondello.
- In the 1971 P. G. Wodehouse novel Much Obliged, Jeeves, Bertie Wooster tells his Aunt Dahlia that at Oxford, his friendship with Ginger Winship was comparable to that of Damon and Pythias. It is not the author's only usage of the reference, as it crops up when introducing the central characters of his 1919 story "A Woman Is Only a Woman", whose friendship is compared to them as well.
- In Episode 8, season 1 of Peter Gunn, a character describes his friendship for the murder victim by saying that people referred to them as "Damon and what's-his-name."
- In a 1997 episode of the TV series Highlander entitled "A Modern Prometheus," a character portraying Lord Byron mentions Damon and Pythias before he jumps with another man to their "death."
- In Season 9, Episode 22 of Law & Order, "Admissions", ADA Carmichael used the reference to describe the relationship between two graduate students who were covering each other in the murder of a fellow female student.
- In the Anthony Trollope novel The Three Clerks, when two of the clerks have a falling out he says, "Damon and Pythias [were] no longer; that war waged between them."
- In the western movie Showdown (1973), Childhood friends Billy Massey (Dean Martin) and Chuck Jarvis (Rock Hudson) go in opposite directions after Chuck ends up married to Billy's former sweetheart, Kate (Susan Clark). Billy becomes a train robber, Chuck a sheriff. But they end up joining forces against common enemies in a final SHOWDOWN. A series of life circumstances put two close childhood friends pitted against each other. The seemingly inevitable ending takes a twist that allows the friendship to continue after Billy commits an act of bravery that he knows is suicidal but saves Chuck's life. Kate (Susan Clark) refers to Chuck and Billy's friendship as that of Damon and Pythias.
- In the 1862 novel Lady Audley's Secret, After Robert Audley's friend, George Talboys is discovered missing, Robert is concerned for his wellbeing. His cousin Alicia Audley, remarks about them, 'What a dreadful catastrophe, since Pythias in the person of Mr Robert Audley, cannot exist for half an hour without Damon, commonly known as George Talboys.'
