= Damon and Pythias (play) =

c. 1564 play by Richard Edwards

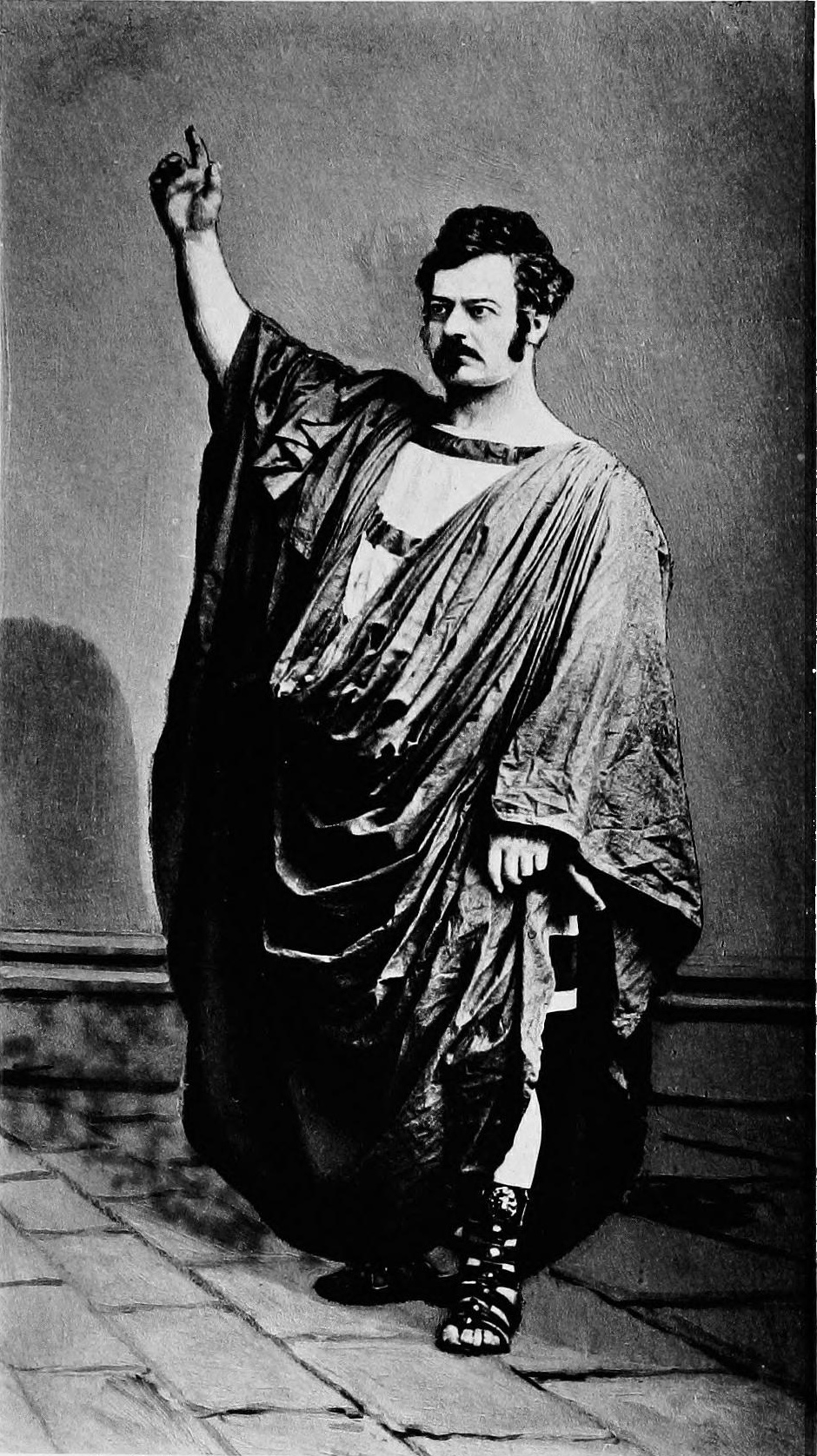
Edwin Forrest as Damon in Damon and Pythias

Damon and Pythias is the only surviving play by Richard Edwards. Written circa 1564 and first printed in 1571, the play chronicles the Greek friendship story of Damon and Pythias. It was originally performed by the Children of the Chapell for Queen Elizabeth I, possibly during the Christmas season between 1564 and 1565.

== Characters ==
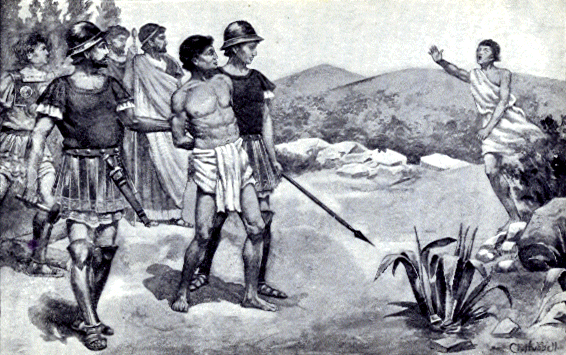
Damon and Pythias

- Damon, a traveling gentleman from Greece, and is close friends with Pythias.
- Pythias, a traveling gentleman from Greece, and is close friends with Damon.
- Stephano, the servant of both Damon and Pythias.
- King Dionysius, the ruler of Syracuse.
- Eubulus, counselor to King Dionysius.
- Aristippus, a courtier in King Dionysius's court.
- Carisophus, a parasite in King Dionysius's court.
- Will, the servant of Aristippus.
- Jack, the servant of Carisophus.
- Groano, the hangman of Syracuse.
- Grim, a collier who sells his coal to King Dionysius's court.

== Synopsis ==
The play begins with the philosopher Aristippus musing on his newfound position as a courtier in King Dionyusius's court in Syracuse. Carisophus enters, looking to join with Aristippus in friendship. Aristippus pretends to agree, though he knows that Carisophus is dissembling and the bond is false.

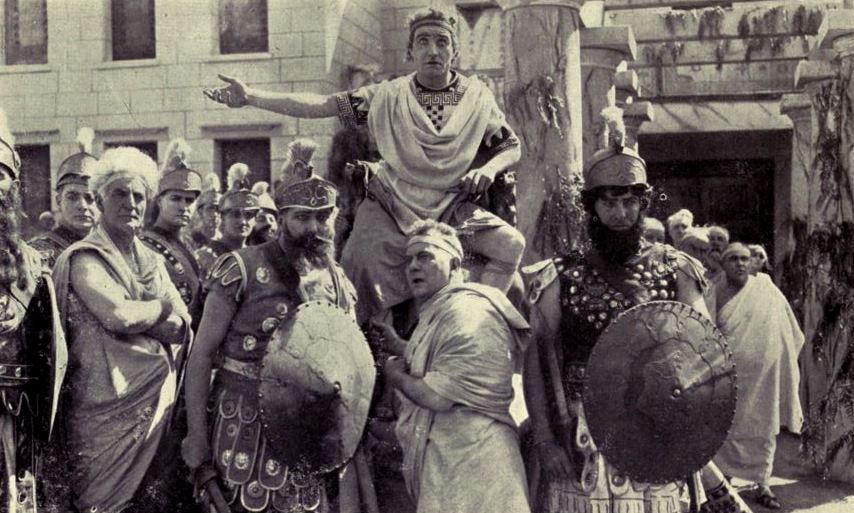
Scene from 1914 film adaptation of Damon and Pythias

Damon, Pythias and Stephano then arrive in Syracuse as part of their travels. The two have been traveling from Greece, and their arrival does not go unnoticed. Carisophus plots to use them in order to advance his own position in court. Damon and Pythias learn about the paranoia and tyranny of King Dionysius and his willingness to kill his subjects. Their servant Stephano begs them to leave before anything terrible can befall them, but the two decide to stay in Syracuse. Carisophus soon meets Damon on the street and has him arrested on suspicion of spying.

Against the advice of his trusty counselor Eubulus, King Dionysius condemns Damon to die. Pythias protests his friend's innocence and declares their bond of true friendship. Dionysius agrees that he will keep Pythias prisoner for the next two months while Damon settles his affairs in Greece. If Damon returns before the two months are up, then Pythias will be cleared of suspicion. If he does not return, then Pythias will be executed in his stead.

The two months pass with no sign of Damon, and preparations are made for Pythias's execution. Meanwhile, Carisophus meets with Aristippus in order to ask his friend to defend him should Damon return. Aristippus refuses and breaks their bond of friendship, saying that it is not like the true friendship between honest men like Damon and Pythias and that he will not protect Carisophus. The scene shifts back to the gallows, where Pythias and Groano await the king's final judgement. Pythias still trusts that Damon will return, but does not fear death, telling Groano the hangman "O thou minister of justice, do thine office by and by, / Let not thy hand tremble, for I tremble not to die." Dionysius orders him to die, but Damon rushes in to stop the execution. Dionysius's heart is so moved by their display of perfect friendship that he stays Pythias's execution. The king goes so far as to ask to become a third friend to them, and Damon and Pythias agree. Dionysius joins with them in amity and resolves to cease acting as a tyrant and listening to flatterers.

The play ends with Eubulus throwing Carisophus from the court and delivering a speech on the virtues of true friendship. Eubulus notes that true friendship is a "true defence for kings...a shield to defend the enemy's cruel hand" and closes the play by wishing that God grant Queen Elizabeth such friends.

== Themes ==
=== Male friendship ===
The notion of male friendship at work in Damon and Pythias harkens back to an idea elaborated by Pythagoras and later Cicero called amicitia perfecta, or ideal and perfect friendship between two men. This notion is seen as the pinnacle of human affection, and occurred between two men of similar social stature who love each other for the sake of that virtue. It is described as altruistic, spiritual and self-sufficient with little mention of marriage or wives, but a focus on two men becoming "second selves." Cicero writes that the perfect male friendship is "above all other things in human life."

== References from other works ==
- In William Shakespeare's Hamlet, in Act III scene 2, after the play-within-the-play, Hamlet calls Horatio, 'Damon', which is believed to be a reference to this play.
