= John T. Godfrey =

American fighter pilot

John Trevor Godfrey
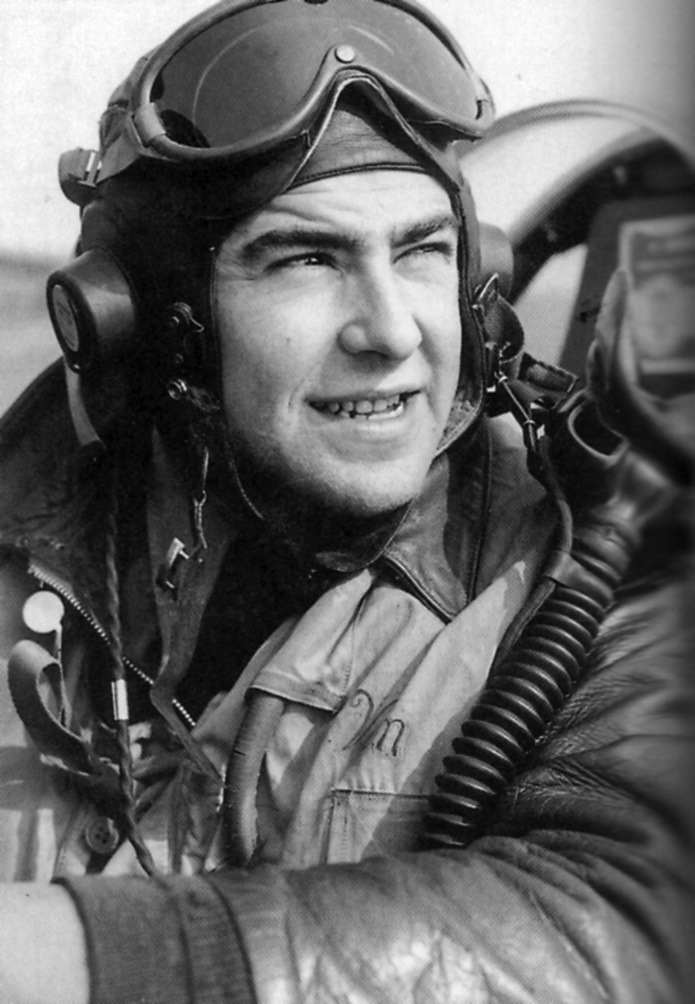
- Born: March 28, 1922; Montreal, Canada
- Died: June 12, 1958 (aged 36); Freeport, Maine, U.S.
- Burial place: Coventry, Rhode Island, U.S.
- Military career
- Allegiance: Canada; United States
- Branch: Royal Canadian Air Force (1941–1943); United States Army Air Forces (1943–1945)
- Service years: 1941–1945
- Rank: Major
- Unit: 4th Fighter Group
- Conflicts: World War II
- Awards: Silver Star (2); Distinguished Flying Cross (8); Air Medal (4)

John Trevor Godfrey (March 28, 1922 – June 12, 1958) was a Canadian-born American fighter pilot and flying ace in the 336th Fighter Squadron, 4th Fighter Group, Eighth Air Force during World War II.

== Biography ==
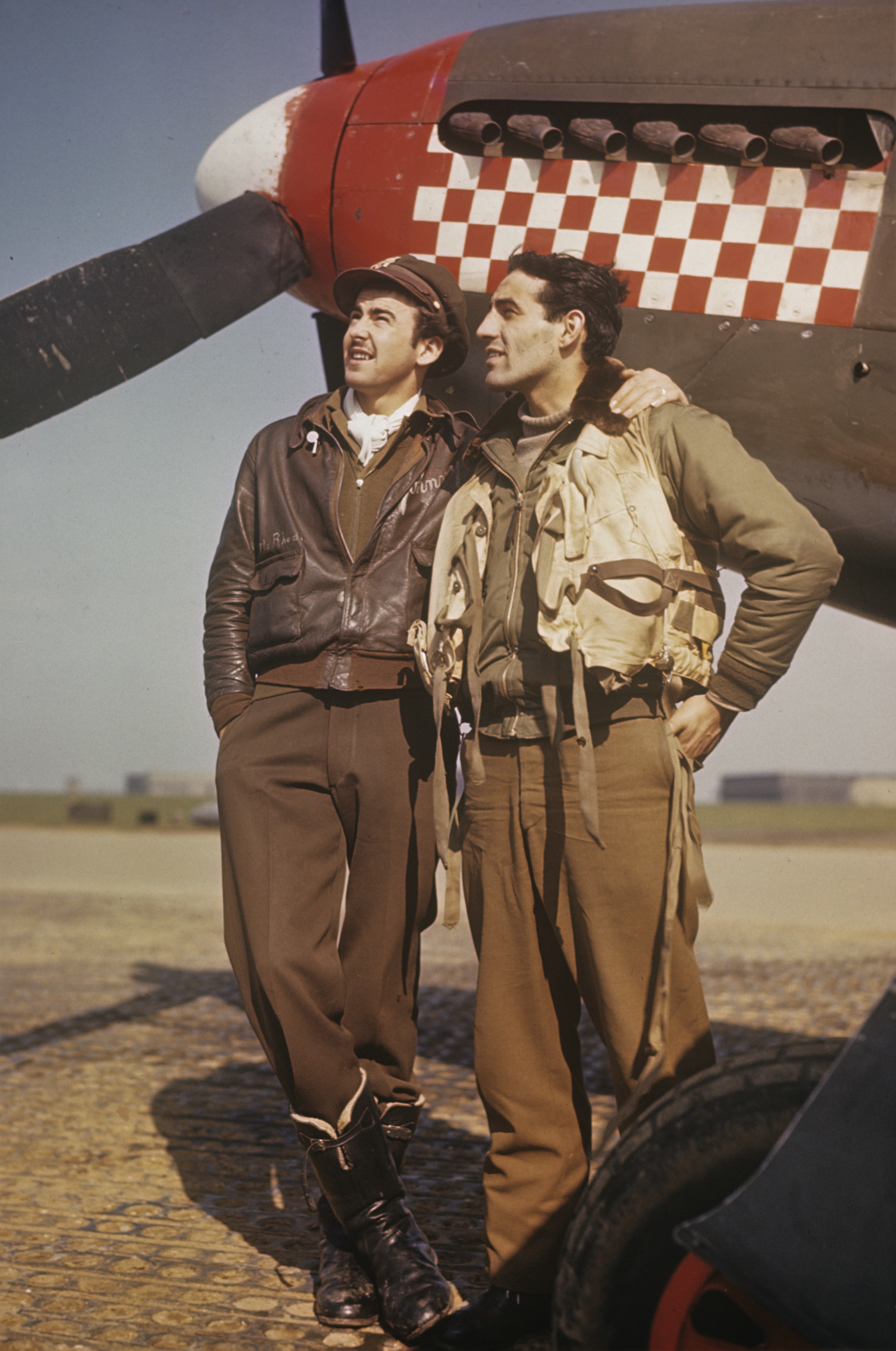
John Godfrey and Don Gentile at RAF Debden

Born in Montreal, Godfrey moved with his family to Woonsocket, Rhode Island, when he was one year old; he later graduated from high school there. In October 1941, he joined the Royal Canadian Air Force (RCAF); he transferred to the United States Army Air Forces (USAAF) in 1943.

As a member of the 4th Fighter Group within the Eighth Air Force of the USAAF, Godfrey was friend and wingman to Don Gentile. Together, they were known as "Captains Courageous", "The Two Man Air Force", "Messerschmitt Killers", or "Damon and Pythias".

Godfrey achieved 18 air-to-air kills against the Luftwaffe until August 24, 1944, when he was accidentally shot down by a wingman and captured by the Germans. He later escaped from Stalag Luft III shortly before the end of the war.

Godfrey was promoted to the rank of major before he was discharged shortly following the war.

After the war, Godfrey served in the Rhode Island Senate where he represented West Greenwich. Elected in 1952, he served until 1954, when he moved his family to Maine.

Godfrey died on June 12, 1958, of ALS at his home in Freeport, Maine. Survived by his wife and two sons, he was buried in Coventry, Rhode Island.

Godfrey's autobiography, The Look of Eagles, was written with Thomas D. White and published posthumously in 1958.
