= H. A. Guerber =

American writer (1859–1929)

Hélène Adeline Guerber (March 9, 1859 – May 26, 1929), also known as H.A. Guerber, was an American writer, specializing in retellings of myths, plays, operas, and history, as well as being a professional teacher.

Although several books by Guerber are still in print, details about her life are scant. There are entries for her in three or four biographical sources from the early 1900s, but apart from listing the books she wrote, these sources provide almost no facts about her life. These book sources are supplemented by two short death notices and six census records (five federal and the 1892 New York state). Even the scant information is sometimes conflicting. So even though Guerber published over two dozen books in her lifetime, she is almost entirely forgotten as a person.

== Biography ==
=== Family ===
According to her death announcement which appeared in the Publishers Weekly in 1929, Guerber was born in Mount Clemens, Michigan on March 9, 1859. Census records list her father as Arnold S. Guerber, born in 1830 in Italy to Swiss parents, and her mother as Emma Guerber, also born in 1830 and of Swiss nationality. Arnold arrived in America in 1845, and Emma in 1853. In 1900 they had been married for 47 years, so they must have gotten married in 1853, the year Emma arrived in America.

Arnold Guerber held various jobs. In 1870 he was an importer of straw goods, in 1880 he was a farmer, and in 1892 and 1900 (when he was 70), he was a real estate broker. The Guerber family appeared well-off. In 1870, when Arnold was 40, he owned real estate valued at $14,000 and personal property valued at $3,000. According to the censuses of 1870, 1900 and 1910, the family also kept a domestic servant.

The 1900 Census states that the Guerbers had five children—three sons and two daughters; Hélène was the third child in the family. The other children were Frederick (1854), Louis (1857), Paul (1861) and Adele (1866). She was the only one born in Michigan; the other children all being born in New York, and except for her birth in the Midwest, all records show the family residing on the East Coast. From 1870 to 1910, the family lived in Rockland County, New York: in 1870, in the town of Ramapo; in 1880, when Arnold was working as a farmer, in the unincorporated village of Monsey; and in 1892, 1900 and 1910 in Orangetown. Some sources during this time list Guerber as living in Nyack, NY, but Nyack is actually a village within Orangetown.

Guerber never married. She kept her maiden name all of her life and lived with her parents and siblings. By the 1920 Census, after her parents had died, she moved to Montclair, New Jersey with her sister Adele and her niece Louise. The Publishers Weekly notice says that at the time of her death in 1929, she had been living in Montclair for sixteen years, so she must have moved there around 1913-14.

=== Education ===
As for her education, the Publishers Weekly death notice also says that, "While Miss Guerber had very little early education, her interests led her to deal with academic classics." However, the 1914-15 Woman's Who's Who of America states that she was educated in Paris, France. It also lists her religion as Episcopalian.

A Paris education seems plausible. She must have spent a good deal of time in Europe, enough to research a detailed guidebook, How to Prepare for Europe: A Handbook of Historical, Literary and Artistic Data with Full Directions for Preliminary Studies and Travel Arrangements (Dodd Mead, 1906). This book exhibits a wide knowledge of European culture and travel. She obviously also felt comfortable with the French and German languages, because she wrote student readers in both.

=== Teaching experience ===
Guerber's teaching experience was probably at the pre-high school level, because she wrote educational books aimed at that audience. She wrote eight books in the Eclectic School Readings Series published by the American Book Company, and they were referred to as Guerber's Historical Readers. One advertisement for these books says they were aimed at students 12–14 years old. In her Preface to The Story of the Greeks, she speaks from her experience as a teacher when she says,

I have found historical anecdotes an excellent aid in teaching English. Pupils find it far from irksome to relate the stories in their own words, and to reproduce them in compositions. Secondly, whenever a city or country is mentioned, every pupil should point out its location on the map. By such means only can any one properly understand an historical narrative; and in the present case there is the added reason that the practice will go far towards increasing the child's interest in geography.

Other books in this series include histories on the Romans, the Chosen People, England, France and the Thirteen Colonies.

=== Retellings of myths and legends ===
Guerber's most enduring works are the ones dealing with myth and legend and written for adult audiences. WorldCat says that 104 editions of The Myths of Greece and Rome were published between 1893 and 2017 in English and French and are held by 1,194 libraries worldwide. Dover Publications says of their version that "This generously illustrated book of classical myths has become a classic itself, long prized for its simple, graphic, accurate retelling of the principal myths of Greece and Rome, and for its commentary on their origins and significance." Guerber's Myths of the Norsemen from the Eddas and Sagas, Legends of the Rhine, and Myths and Legends of the Middle Ages are also enduring classics. Less known are her retellings of Shakespeare's plays, Wagner's, and other, popular operas, as well as the great epic poems.

Guerber made conscious efforts to remove themes of homosexuality in myths while writing her work The Myths of Greece and Rome. She rewrote stories by writing them as platonic and/or removing the homosexual elements (including characters), as well as entirely excluding several myths that center around characters with homosexual relationships.

=== Death ===
Guerber died on May 26, 1929. Her simple death notice, published in the Montclair New Jersey Times, read as follows,

"DIED GUERBER, HELENE A. At her residence, 31 Oakwood Ave., Upper Montclair, N.J., on Sunday, May 26, 1929. Funeral services at St. James' Church, corner of Dellevue Ave. and Valley Rd., Upper Montclair, yesterday afternoon at 1:30 o'clock. Interment at Greenwood Cemetery."

Her parents Arnold and Emma and her brother Louis are also buried in Greenwood Cemetery, NY.

== Works ==
- The Myths of Greece & Rome (London, George G Harrap & Co, 1908)
- Legends of the Rhine (A.S. Barnes & Co., New York, 1895; new edition 1905)
- Empresses of France (New York, Dodd, Mead and Co., 1901)
- Legends of the Virgin and Christ (New York, Dodd, Mead and Co., 1896)
- Stories of the Wagner Opera (New York, Dodd, Mead and Co., 1895)
- Märchen und Erzählungen (Boston, D.C. Heath & Co. 1900)
- The Book of the Epic (Philadelphia, J. B. Lippincott Co., 1913)
- The Story of the Chosen People
- The Story of the Greeks
- The Story of the Romans (New York, American Book Company, 1896)
- Legends of the Middle Ages (London, George G Harrap & Co, 1909)
- The Story of the Renaissance and Reformation
- The Story of the Thirteen Colonies
- The Story of the Great Republic
- Myths of the Norsemen from the Eddas and Sagas 1909

== See also ==
- H. R. Ellis Davidson
