= Dominic Salvatore Gentile =

American flying ace (1920–1951)

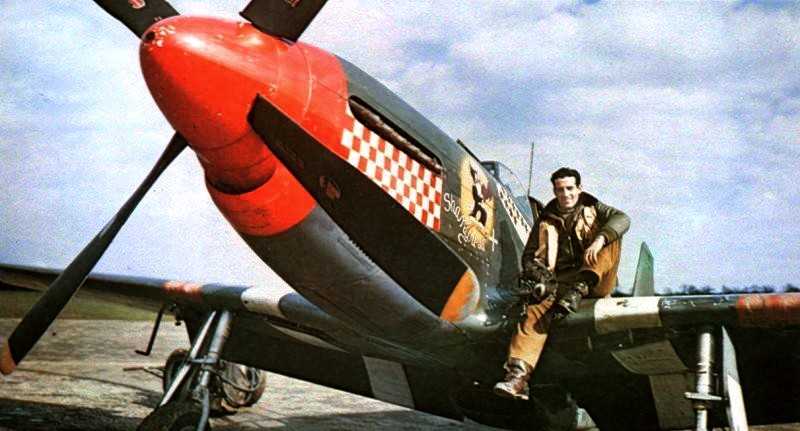
- Don Gentile on the wing of his P-51B, Shangri-La
- Born: December 6, 1920; Piqua, Ohio, US
- Died: January 28, 1951 (aged 30); Forestville, Maryland, US
- Military career
- Allegiance: Canada; United States
- Branch: Royal Canadian Air Force (1941–42); United States Army Air Forces (1942–47); United States Air Force (1947–51)
- Service years: 1941–1951
- Rank: Major
- Nicknames: "Don", "Ace of Aces"
- Units: No. 133 Squadron RAF; 336th Fighter Squadron
- Conflicts: World War II
- Awards: Distinguished Service Cross (2); Distinguished Flying Cross (8); Air Medal (4)

Dominic Salvatore "Don" Gentile (/ˌdʒɛnˈtɪli/ jen-TILLEE; December 6, 1920 – January 28, 1951), was a World War II RAF and USAAF pilot who achieved fame as he came close to surpassing Eddie Rickenbacker's World War I record of 26 downed aircraft. He later served in the post-war U.S. Air Force.

== Early life ==
Gentile was born in Piqua, Ohio, the son of Italian immigrants Patsy and Josephina Gentile, who immigrated in 1907. After a fascination with flying as a child, his father provided him with his own plane, an Aerosport Biplane. He managed to log over 300 hours flying time by July 1941, when he attempted to join the US Army Air Corps.

== Royal Canadian Air Force ==
The U.S. military required two years of college for its pilots, which Gentile did not have, so he enlisted in the Royal Canadian Air Force and was posted to the UK in Dec 1941 as a Pilot Officer. Gentile flew the Supermarine Spitfire Mk V with No. 133 Squadron, one of the three famed RAF "Eagle Squadron"s beginning in June, 1942. His first kills (a Ju 88 and Fw 190) were on August 19, 1942, at Dieppe during Operation Jubilee.

== 4th Fighter Group ==
In September 1942, the Eagle squadron pilots transferred to the USAAF, becoming the nucleus of the 4th Fighter Group. Gentile became a flight leader in September 1943, now flying the P-47 Thunderbolt. Having flown Spitfires, Gentile and some of the other pilots of the 4th were displeased when they transitioned to the heavy P-47C in April 1943. On 16 December 1943, Gentile claimed one third-share of a destroyed Ju 88. On 5 January 1944, he claimed a Fw 190 west of Tours. Two Fw 190s were claimed on 14 January and a single 190 on 25 February.

By late 1943, future Group Commander Col. Don Blakeslee pushed for re-equipment with the lighter, more maneuverable P-51 Mustang. After conversion to the P-51B at the end of February 1944, Gentile built a tally of 15.5 additional aircraft destroyed between March 3 and April 8, 1944.

His first victory flying the P-51 was on 3 March, when he claimed a Do 217 in the Wittenberg area.

Together with his occasional wingman John T. Godfrey, they were known as 'Captains Courageous', 'The Two-Man Air Force', and 'Damon and Pythias'. On a March 8, 1944 mission near Berlin, Gentile and Godfrey teamed up to claim six Bf 109s between them. Gentile was awarded the Distinguished Service Cross for that mission.

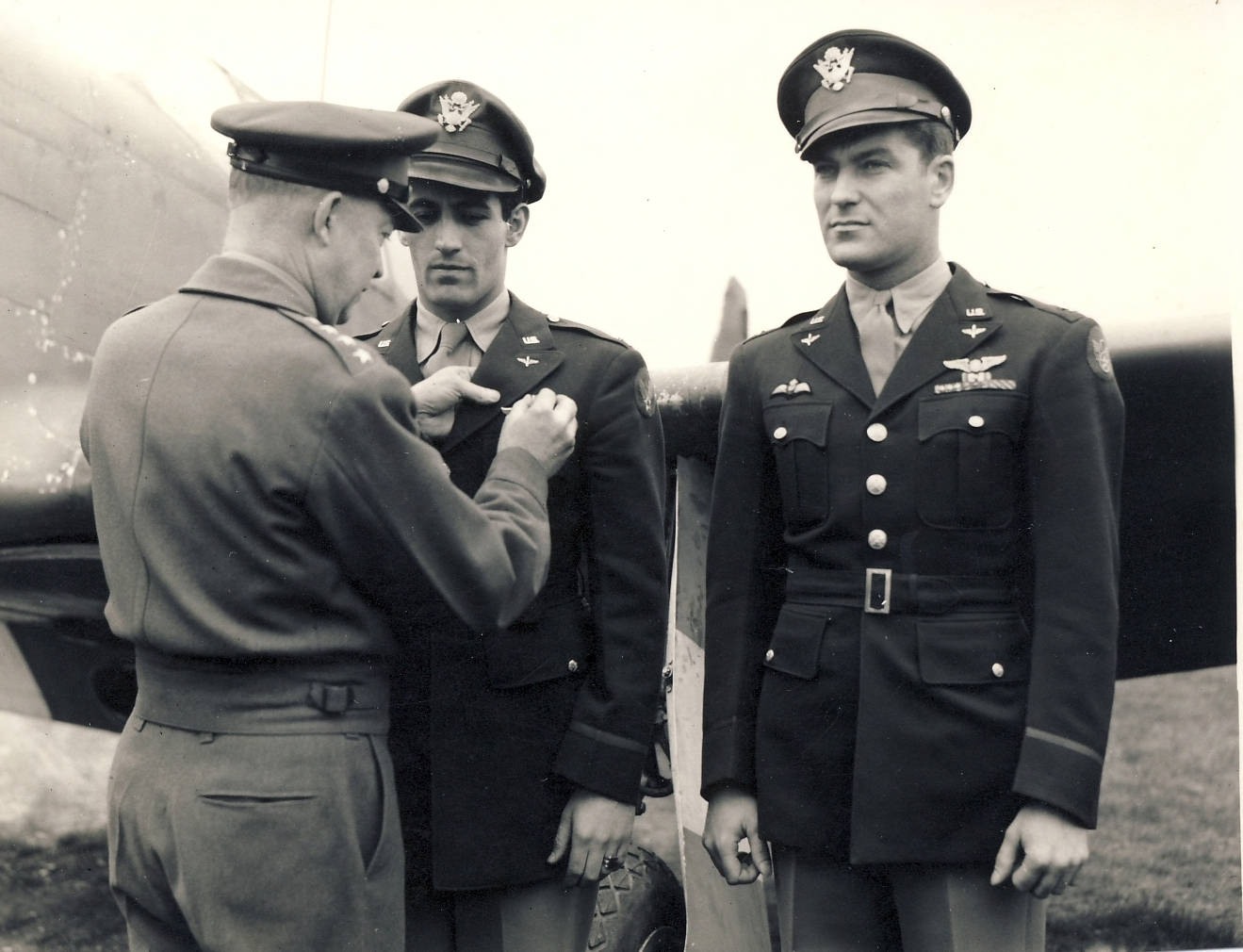
General Dwight D. Eisenhower awards the Distinguished Service Cross to Gentile (left) and Colonel Donald Blakeslee on April 11, 1944.

After downing three more planes on April 8, he was the top scoring 8th Air Force pilot when he crashed his P-51, "Shangri-La", on April 13, 1944, while buzzing the 4th FG's Debden airfield for a group of assembled press reporters. Blakeslee immediately grounded Gentile as a result, and he went back to the US for a planned tour selling war bonds. In 1944, Gentile co-wrote with well-known war correspondent Ira Wolfert One Man Air Force, an autobiography and account of his combat missions.

Gentile's initial claim of 30 aircraft destroyed (including 7 on the ground) was later reduced to a final tally of 19.83 aerial victories and 3 damaged, with 6 ground kills, in 350 combat hours flown plus the two victories claimed while with the RAF Eagle Squadron.

== Post war ==
After the war, he stayed with the Air Force, as a test pilot at Wright Field, as a Training Officer in the Fighter Gunnery Program, and as a student officer at the Air Tactical School. He married his wife, Isabella, in November 1944. In June 1949, Gentile enrolled as an undergraduate studying military science at the University of Maryland.

== Death ==
On January 28, 1951, he was killed when he crashed in a T-33A-1-LO Shooting Star trainer, AF Ser. No. 49-0905, in Forestville, Maryland, leaving behind his wife Isabella Masdea Gentile Beitman (deceased October 2008), and sons Don Jr., Joseph and Pasquale.

Gentile's funeral was at St. John the Baptist Church in Italian Village, Columbus, Ohio and is buried at Saint Joseph Cemetery in Lockbourne, Ohio.

== Awards and decorations ==
Gentile's awards and decorations include:

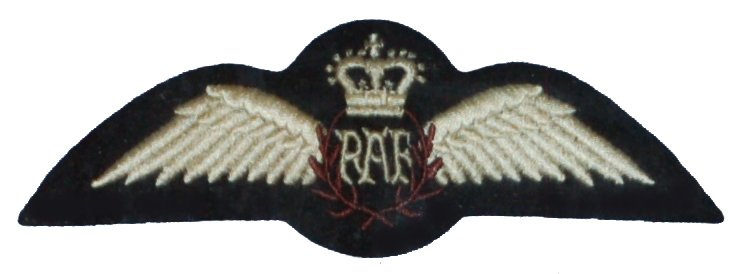
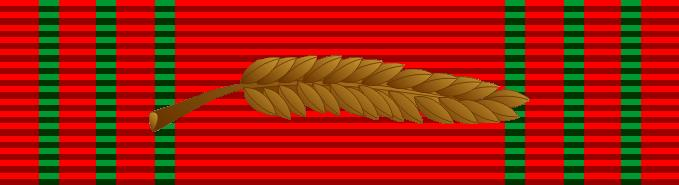
USAF Senior pilot badge
RAF pilot brevet
Distinguished Service Cross with bronze oak leaf cluster
Distinguished Flying Cross with silver and two bronze oak leaf clusters
Air Medal with three bronze oak leaf clusters
Air Force Presidential Unit Citation with two bronze oak leaf clusters
American Campaign Medal
European-African-Middle Eastern Campaign Medal with bronze campaign star
World War II Victory Medal
National Defense Service Medal
Air Force Longevity Service Award with bronze oak leaf cluster
British Distinguished Flying Cross
Belgian Croix de Guerre with Palm
Canadian Volunteer Service Medal

=== Distinguished Service Cross citation (1st Award) ===

Gentile, Dominic S.
Captain (Air Corps), U.S. Army Air Forces
336th Fighter Squadron, 4th Fighter Group, 8th Air Force
Date of Action: March 08, 1944

Citation:

The President of the United States of America, authorized by Act of Congress, July 9, 1918, presented the Distinguished Service Cross to Captain (Air Corps) Dominic "Don" Salvatore Gentile, United States Army Air Forces, for extraordinary heroism in connection with military operations against an armed enemy while serving as Pilot of a P-51 Fighter Airplane in the 336th Fighter Squadron, 4th Fighter Group, Eighth Air Force, in aerial combat against enemy forces on 8 March 1944, in the European Theater of Operations. On this date Captain Gentile, while leading a section of Fighter Aircraft on a bomber escort mission to targets in the vicinity of Berlin, Germany, saw a flight of bombers being attacked by approximately fifty enemy fighters. With only his wing man as support and without regard to the overwhelming odds against him, Captain Gentile immediately attacked the enemy formation and by extremely courageous flying and skillful gunnery destroyed three enemy planes and broke up the threat against the bombers. Continuing with his wing man, they destroyed three more enemy fighters. By this time the wing man had expended his ammunition and Captain Gentile's supply was very low. Despite this fact, they picked up a straggling bomber and escorted it to friendly territory. Captain Gentile's outstanding courage and determination to destroy the enemy on this occasion set an example of heroism which will be an inspiration to the Armed Forces of the United States.

=== Distinguished Service Cross citation (2nd Award) ===

Gentile, Dominic S.
Captain (Air Corps), U.S. Army Air Forces
336th Fighter Squadron, 4th Fighter Group, 8th Air Force
Date of Action: April 8, 1944

Citation:

"The President of the United States of America, authorized by Act of Congress July 9, 1918, takes pleasure in presenting a Bronze Oak Leaf Cluster in lieu of a Second Award of the Distinguished Service Cross to Captain (Air Corps) Dominic "Don" Salvatore Gentile, United States Army Air Forces, for extraordinary heroism in connection with military operations against an armed enemy while serving as Pilot of a P-51 Fighter Airplane in the 336th Fighter Squadron, 4th Fighter Group, Eighth Air Force, in aerial combat against enemy forces on April 8, 1944. On this date Captain Gentile destroyed three enemy fighters and assisted in destruction of a fourth in a single engagement. Captain Gentile's unquestionable valor in aerial combat is in keeping with the highest traditions of the military service and reflects great credit upon himself, the 8th Air Force, and the United States Army Air Forces."

== Legacy ==
A Civil Air Patrol squadron based in Sidney, Ohio was named in honor of Don Gentile.

On Independence Day Weekend (July 6) 1986, a statue of Don Gentile (pictured) was dedicated in his hometown Piqua Ohio.

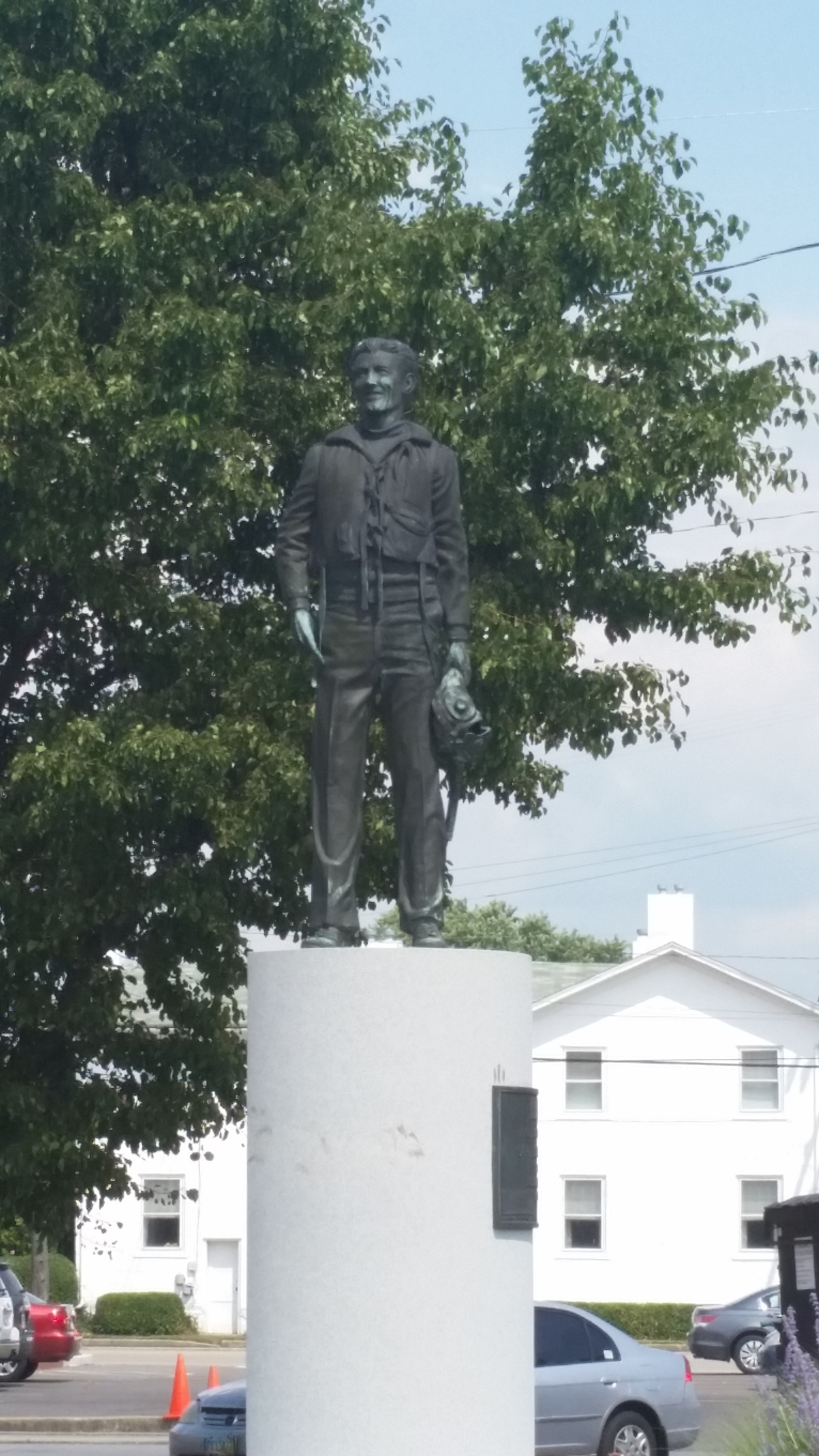
Statue of Dominic Salvatore Gentile, located in Piqua Ohio

Gentile Air Force Station in Kettering, Ohio was named in his honor in 1962. The installation closed in 1996.

Gentile Nature Park, located on the site of the former Gentile Air Force Station, is named in his honor. Opened in 2024, it features a 100+ foot zipline, a nature-themed playground, walking trails, and a bike path.

Winston Churchill called Gentile and his wingman, Captain John T. Godfrey, Damon and Pythias, after the legendary characters from Greek mythology. He was inducted into the National Aviation Hall of Fame in 1995.
