= Pytheas (crater) =

Crater on the Moon

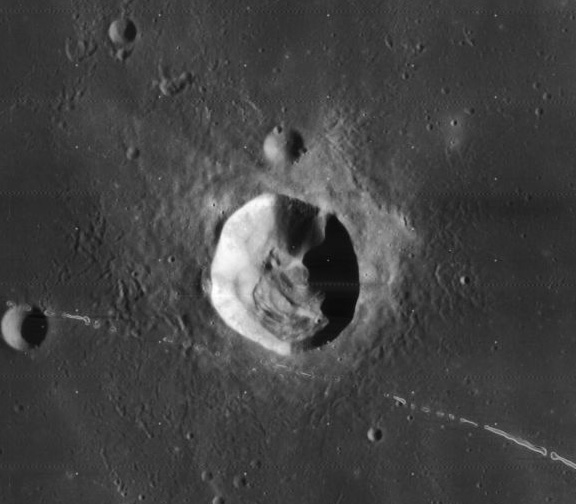
- Lunar Orbiter 4 image (Streak crossing below crater is blemish on original image)
- Coordinates: 20.5°N 20.6°W
- Diameter: 20 km
- Depth: 2.54 km
- Colongitude: 21° at sunrise
- Formation: Copernican
- Eponym: Pytheas

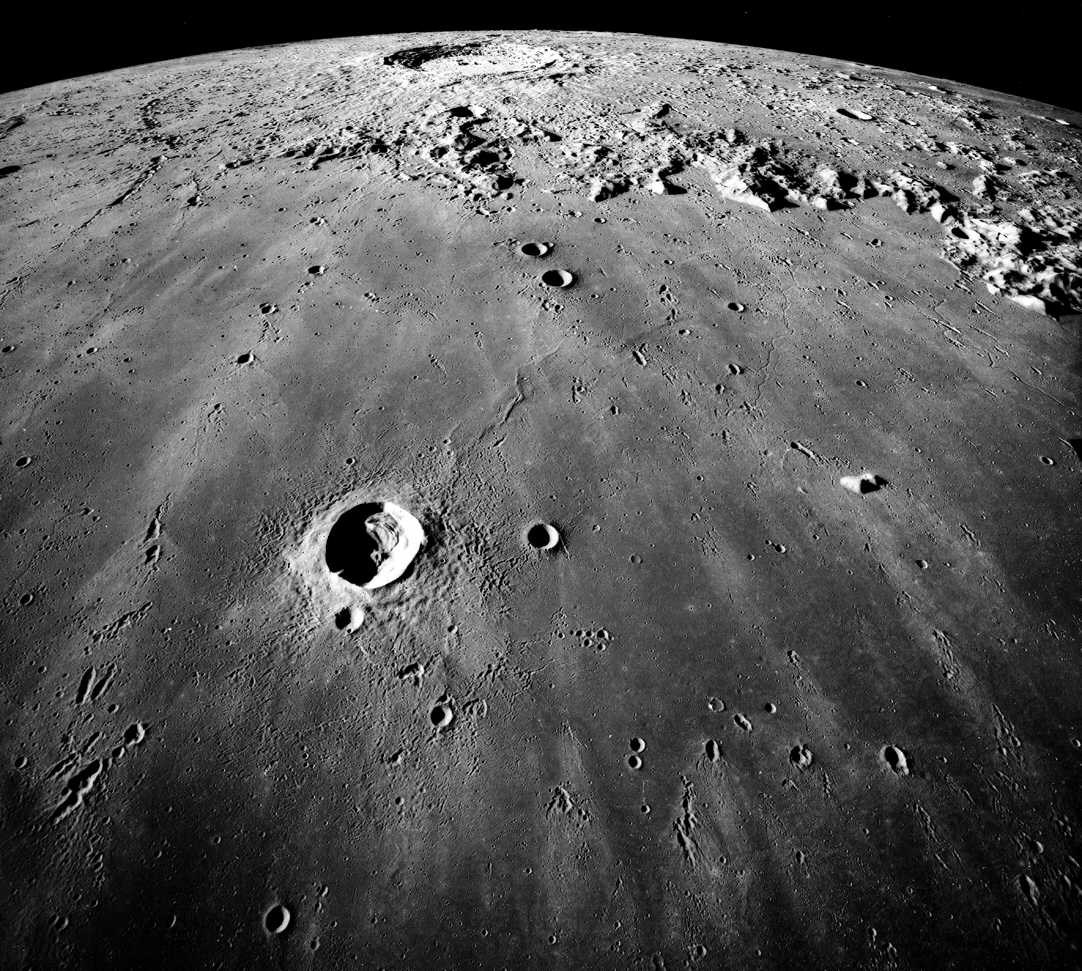
Pytheas (lower left) and Copernicus (top) from Apollo 17. NASA photo.

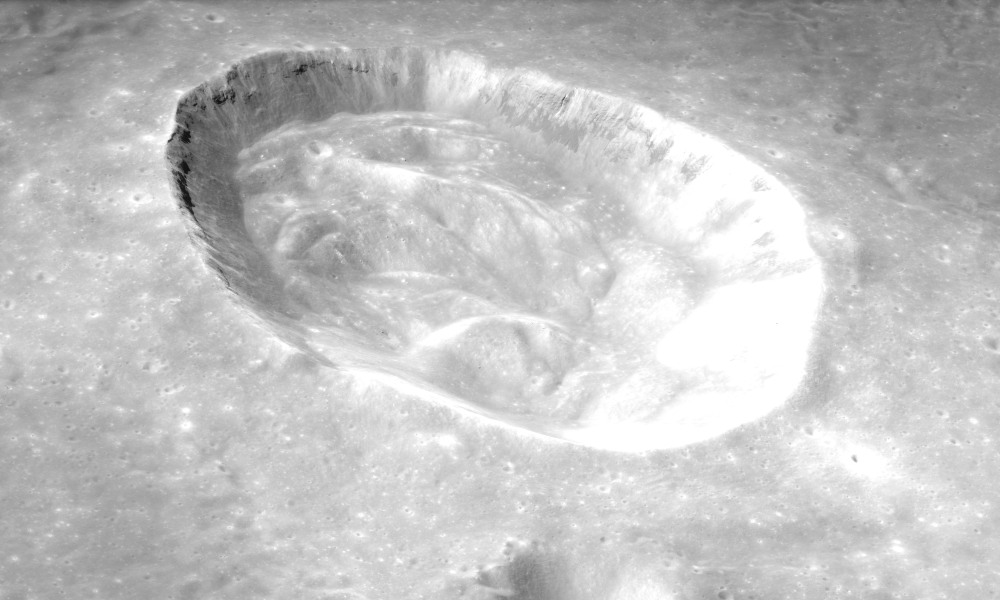
Oblique view from Apollo 15, facing south

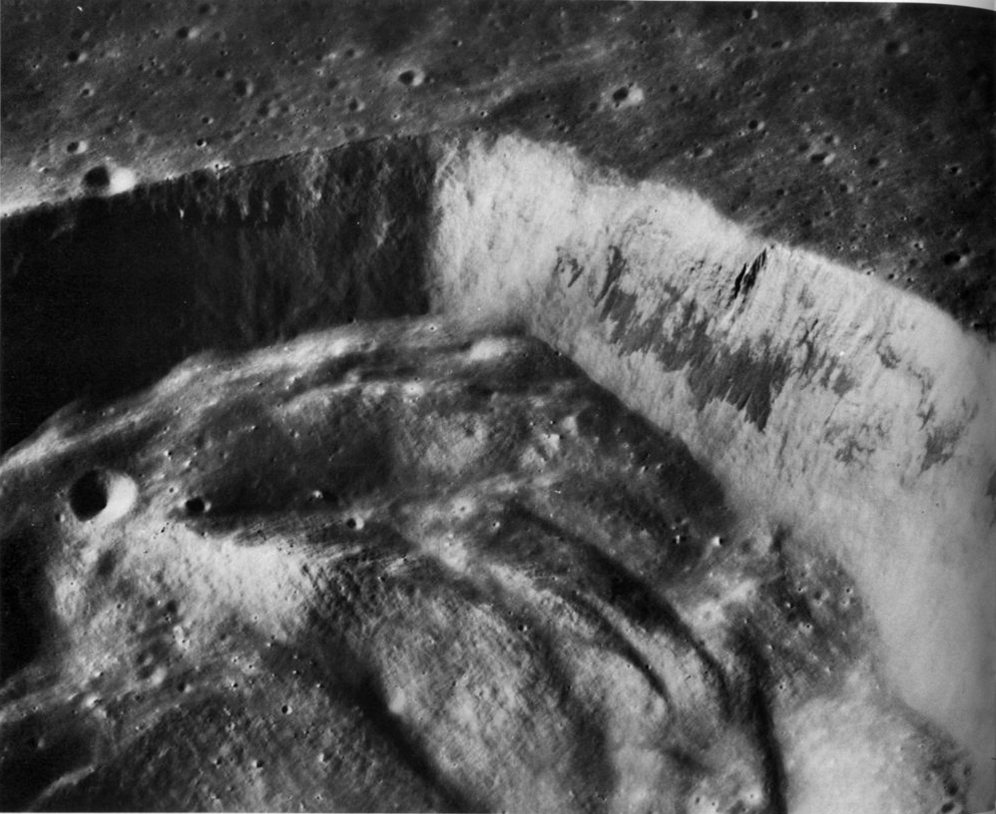
Close up of the south wall of Pytheas crater from Apollo 17

Pytheas is a small lunar impact crater located on the southern part of the Mare Imbrium, to the south of the crater Lambert. It was named after ancient Greek navigator and geographer Pytheas of Massalia.

It has a sharply defined rim, a hummocky outer rampart, and an irregular interior due to slumping or fall-back. The infrared spectrum of pure crystalline plagioclase has been identified on the central peak. There is a small crater along the northern outer rampart, and a similar crater about 20 km to the west. The crater possesses a small ray system that extends for a radius of about 50 kilometers. It is surrounded by lunar mare that is dusted with ray material from Copernicus to the south.

== Satellite craters ==
By convention these features are identified on lunar maps by placing the letter on the side of the crater midpoint that is closest to Pytheas.

Pytheas	Latitude	Longitude	Diameter
A	20.5° N	21.7° W	6 km
B	17.5° N	19.4° W	4 km
C	18.8° N	19.1° W	4 km
D	21.1° N	20.5° W	5 km
E	18.1° N	19.0° W	4 km
F	16.5° N	19.1° W	5 km
G	21.6° N	17.7° W	4 km
H	20.5° N	16.5° W	3 km
J	21.6° N	21.1° W	3 km
K	19.9° N	16.2° W	2 km
L	18.6° N	16.9° W	3 km
M	19.9° N	17.7° W	3 km
N	22.5° N	20.5° W	3 km
U	21.7° N	19.4° W	3 km
W	21.7° N	23.7° W	3 km
