= Eagle Squadron (film) =

1942 film by Arthur Lubin

- Australian film poster
- Directed by: Arthur Lubin
- Written by: C.S. Forester (story); Norman Reilly Raine (screenplay)
- Produced by: Walter Wanger
- Starring: Robert Stack; Diana Barrymore; John Loder; Nigel Bruce
- Narrated by: Quentin Reynolds
- Cinematography: Stanley Cortez
- Edited by: Philip Cahn
- Music by: Frank Skinner
- Production company: Walter Wanger Productions
- Distributed by: Universal Pictures
- Release date: June 16, 1942
- Running time: 109 minutes
- Country: United States
- Language: English
- Budget: $908,768
- Box office: $2,607,422

Eagle Squadron is a 1942 American war film directed by Arthur Lubin and starring Robert Stack, Diana Barrymore, John Loder and Nigel Bruce. It was based on a story by C.S. Forester that appeared in Cosmopolitan magazine, and inspired by media reports of the fighting in the Battle of Britain, in particular, the American pilots who volunteered before the United States entered World War II, to fly for the Royal Air Force in the actual Eagle Squadrons.

== Plot ==
As war breaks out in Europe, young Americans Chuck S. Brewer (Robert Stack), Johnny M. Coe (Leif Erickson) and Wadislaw Borowsky (Edgar Barrier) cross the Atlantic to join the Royal Air Force. Assigned to the Eagle Squadron, made up of other American pilots, they make friends with Squadron Leader Paddy Carson (John Loder), and women flyers Anne Partridge (Diana Barrymore) and Nancy Mitchell (Evelyn Ankers). Chuck is immediately attracted to Nancy, but she already has a boyfriend, Hank Starr (Jon Hall), another pilot in the squadron.

Once they are trained as fighter pilots, on their first mission against a German air force base, Johnny and Chuck are shot down, and Johnny is killed. Chuck parachutes into the sea and is rescued, but back at the base, he learns that two other pilots trying to protect them when both Americans broke formation, were also killed.

At a military dance, Chuck and Anne arrange for a date that turns out to be a picnic with a group of evacuated children, interrupted by a German air raid. Later, Squadron Leader Carson, who also likes Anne, takes her to London, with Chuck following the pair. During the bombing of a hospital, Anne is wounded leading others out of the burning building, but finds her father, Sir James Partridge (Paul Cavanagh), a noted pacifist, who dies in her arms.

Chuck and Wadislaw, along with Carson, take part in a commando raid in France to capture a top-secret new "Leopard" German fighter. (Note: The aircraft that is seen in the film is the Messerschmitt Bf 109.) The mission ends with Carson and Wadislaw dead, but Chuck takes off and shoots his way out of enemy territory, bringing the stolen fighter aircraft back to England. At an award ceremony, both Chuck and Anne are decorated for their bravery, but the ceremony is cut short by another German air raid. Chuck, who has proposed to Anne, kisses her on the cheek before taking to the air.

== Cast ==
- Robert Stack as Chuck S. Brewer
- Diana Barrymore as Anne Partridge (Note: The film marked Diana Barrymore's feature film debut.)
- John Loder as Paddy Carson
- Nigel Bruce as McKinnon
- Jon Hall as Hank Starr
- Eddie Albert as Leckie
- Evelyn Ankers as Nancy Mitchell
- Leif Erickson as Johnny M. Coe
- Edgar Barrier as Wadislaw Borowsky
- Isobel Elsom as Dame Elizabeth Whitby
- Alan Hale Jr. as Olsen
- Don Porter as Ramsey
- Frederick Worlock as Grenfall
- Stanley Ridges as Air Minister
- Gene Reynolds as The kid
- Robert Warwick as Bullock
- Clarence Straight as Chandler
- Edmund Glover as Meeker
- Gladys Cooper as Aunt Emmeline
- Rhys Williams as Sgt. Johns
- Paul Cavanagh as Sir James Patridge
- Gavin Muir as Major Severn
- Richard Fraser as Lt. Jefferys
- Richard Crane as Griffith
- Howard Banks as Barker
- Harold Landon as Welch
- Todd Karns as Meyers
- Charles King Jr. as Cadet Chubby
- Jill Esmond as Phyllis
- Ian Wolfe as Sir Charles Porter
- Alan Napier as Black Watch officer
- Harold De Becker as Pvt. Owen
- Donald Stuart as Hoskins
- Carl Harbord as Lubbock
- Charles Irwin as Sir Benjamin Trask
- Florence Gill As Cockney
- Olaf Hytten as Day Controller

Eagle Squadron featured both American and British actors. L-R: Americans Jon Hall and Robert Stack flank British actor John Loder.

== Documentary version ==
The film began as a documentary on real Eagle Squadron pilots, with cooperation with the British Ministry of Information which provided actual aerial combat footage.

On October 23, 1940, producer Walter Wanger announced he would make Eagle Squadron for United Artists and that he wanted William Wellman to direct. On November 4, 20th Century Fox announced they were going to make a rival project, The Eagles Fly Again, with Henry Fonda and Don Ameche.

In November Wanger hired William Hird Bennett to write the script.

In March 1941 Wanger announced the film would be one of three pictures he would make for United Artists, the other being Sundown and So Gallantly Gleaming. In July Wanger said the film would be part of a four-picture deal with UA, the others being Sundown, Cheyenne and To Be Or Not to Be. Harry Watts and Ernest Schoedsack would direct.

Wanger sent fellow producer Merian C. Cooper and directors Harry Watt and Schoedsack, to film the squadron in action. Watt and screenwriter Ian Dalrymple came from the British Crown Film Unit.

The film's producers identified six pilots who would serve as the focus of the film. In September the New York Times reported that they had been shooting in England for three months, and the six men were Andrew Mamedoff, Gregory Daymond, Eugene Tobin, William R. Dunn, Luke Allen and Chesley G Petersen. Schoedsack said he did not want to focus on any particular flier in case one was shot down - that happened to Tobin in September. Schoedsack was forbidden to fly on missions because if he was shot down, as a civilian he would be subject to execution because he was not one of the armed forces.

The squadron continued to fight during filming in Britain, and several pilots were killed. Technical advisor John M. Hill, on leave from the RAF due to a war injury and an actual member of the Eagle squadron, was one of only four pilots of the 17-strong squadron to survive.

The six months of pre-production filming were fraught with many problems, including the reluctance of the Eagle Squadron pilots to take part. It ended with Watt and Dalrymple resigning.

Although the original documentary project was not possible, the footage shot would prove to be recycled for a new film.

== Feature film production ==
In October 1941 Wanger sold his company, including sixteen properties, to United Artists, but kept the rights to Eagle Squadron. Wanger intended to set up a new company and make Eagle Squadron its first film.

On November 17 Wanger announced he had signed a deal to make movies at Universal, including Eagle Squadron. This film would no longer be a documentary but a fictional story, based on a magazine story by C.S. Forester. Norman Reilly Raine was writing the script. The film would use footage taken in England, but now the characters would be played by actors rather than real pilots.

Reportedly the fictional story had been an idea of Raine's, who sold it to Wanger, who then hired Forester to write it up as a magazine story.

In December 1941 Wanger announced the female lead would be played by Diana Barrymore who was appearing on stage in The Land is Bright. Other key roles went to Robert Stack, Leif Ericson and Jon Hall. (while Hall's role is small Wanger later put the actor in Arabian Nights).

In early January Universal announced that the director would be Arthur Lubin. Lubin got the job directing on the back of his success with Abbott and Costello.

Filming started 15 January. Location shooting took place at Universal Studio's backlot outside Los Angeles. Stack remembers Barrymore as "a sad and thoroughly mixed up lady" with "an inclination to drink away her problems, a fiery temper and an erratic emotional perspective. But she had neither the time nor the training to acquire the enormous technical foundation in acting that other members of her famous family had."

Eagle Squadron begins with the onscreen declaration, "This production was made possible through the cooperation of The British Air Ministry, The British Ministry of Information, The Royal Air Force [and] The Eagle Squadron of the R.A.F." Noted war correspondent and radio commentator Quentin Reynolds, who also documented the role of the Eagle squadrons, narrates an extended foreword.

== Reception ==
=== Box office ===
Although real Eagle Squadron pilots disliked its fictionalization of their experiences, Eagle Squadron was a box office hit, earning a profit of $697,607. Variety said it earned $1.8 million in rentals in the US in 1942. Its San Francisco premiere at the Orpheum Theater, raised $200,000 in war bond sales.

In the UK the film earned £144,649.

=== Critical response ===
Critically, the film did not fare well. Bosley Crowther, in his review in The New York Times, thought the blending of fictional and real-life events was outlandish and dismissed the film as nothing more than a B film. He wrote that Eagle Squadron was "... far from the genuine drama about American fliers with the R. A. F. that it should be, but is rather a highfalutin war adventure film which waxes embarrassingly mawkish about English courage and American spunk."
