= De Peyster Brown =

American fighter pilot

De Peyster Douw Brown
- Born: December 1915; Pennsylvania, U.S.
- Died: 3 August 1991 (aged 75); Santa Maria, California, U.S.
- Military career
- Allegiance: Canada; United States
- Branch: Royal Canadian Air Force; United States Air Force
- Service years: 1940–1957
- Rank: Flying Officer (RCAF); Major (USAAF)
- Service number: RCAF – C1094; USAAF – AO1699391
- Unit: No. 1 Squadron RCAF
- Conflicts: World War II: Battle of Britain; Berlin Airlift
- Awards: Distinguished Flying Cross

De Peyster Douw Brown DFC (December 1915 – 3 August 1991) was an American fighter pilot who volunteered to fly for the Royal Canadian Air Force in World War II. He was one of nine American pilots who flew with Fighter Command between 10 July and 31 October 1940, thereby qualifying for the Battle of Britain clasp to the 1939–45 campaign star.

== World War II ==
Brown joined the Royal Canadian Air Force claiming to be of Canadian nationality on 9 September 1939 and was posted to No. 112 Squadron RCAF. On arrival in England he was sent to No. 5 OTU RAF Aston Down to convert to Hurricanes and then to No. 1 Squadron RCAF at RAF Northolt on 2 September 1940.

On 27 September 1940 he claimed a Dornier Do 17 destroyed and a shared Junkers Ju 88. On 5 October he was badly shot up in combat with Messerschmitt Bf 109s but nevertheless pursued one into cloud, being later credited with a "damaged". His own aircraft crashed on landing back at Northolt but he was uninjured.

Brown transferred to the United States Army Air Forces on 25 May 1942. He was given the rank of lieutenant, later promoted captain, and held the rank of major when he retired. He remained in the service for 12 years after the end of World War II and after the war was involved with the Berlin Airlift and possibly served in Korea.

Brown died in a hospital in Santa Maria, California in August 1991.

== See also ==
- List of RAF aircrew in the Battle of Britain
- Non-British personnel in the RAF during the Battle of Britain § United States
