= Phillip Leckrone =

American RAF World War II pilot

Phillip Howard Leckrone
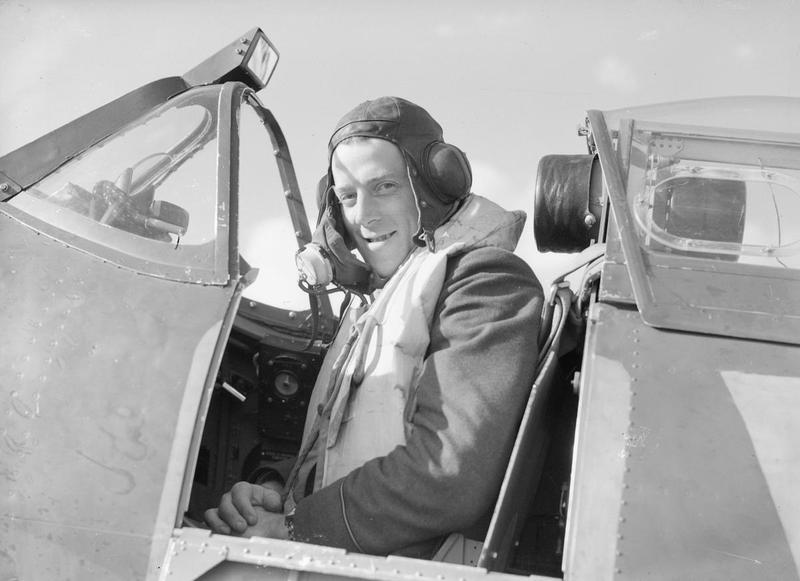
- Leckrone in the cockpit of his Spitfire, September 1940
- Born: 1912; Salem, Illinois, U.S.
- Died: 5 January 1941 (aged 28); KIA over Lincolnshire
- Burial place: Kirton-in-Lindsey Cemetery, Lincolnshire
- Military career
- Allegiance: United Kingdom
- Branch: Royal Air Force
- Service years: 1940–1941
- Rank: Pilot Officer
- Nicknames: Uncle Sam, Zeke
- Service number: 84653
- Units: No. 616 Squadron; No. 71 Squadron
- Conflicts: World War II: Battle of Britain

Pilot Officer Phillip Howard Leckrone (sometimes spelled Philip) (1912 – 5 January 1941) was an American pilot who flew with the Royal Air Force during the Battle of Britain in World War II. He was one of 11 American pilots who flew with RAF Fighter Command between 10 July and 31 October 1940, thereby qualifying for the Battle of Britain clasp to the 1939–45 campaign star. He was killed in a flying accident in January 1941.

== Early life ==
Leckrone was from Salem, Illinois, the son of William and Lottie Leckrone. He was married to Mackenzie A. Leckrone. He was an experienced pilot, owning his own aircraft.

== World War II ==
Leckrone travelled to Britain in 1940 and enlisted in the Royal Air Force. Following conversion to the Spitfire at 7OTU RAF Hawarden, he joined No. 616 Squadron at RAF Kenley on 2 August 1940. He flew a Brewster airplane. He flew more than two dozen sorties over the English Channel as a tail-end Charlie in 616 Squadron. He was later posted to No. 71 Squadron at RAF Church Fenton on 12 October 1940, to join other American volunteers in the first 'Eagle' squadron. He was nicknamed "Uncle Sam" and "Zeke".

=== Death ===
On 5 January 1941, Leckrone was taking part in a formation practice when he collided with Pilot Officer Edwin Ezell Orbison, who was able to reach base and safety. Leckrone went into a tail-spin and plunged toward the ground. Pilot Officer Vernon Keogh, who was flying in formation practice at 20,000 feet with Orbison and Leckrone, followed Leckrone down, shouting at him over the radio telephone. "Bail out! Bail out!" Leckrone did not reply and made no attempt to bail out. He died on impact and was the first fatality in No. 71 Squadron.

He is buried in Kirton-in-Lindsey Cemetery in Lincolnshire.

== See also ==
- Eagle Squadrons
- List of RAF aircrew in the Battle of Britain
- Non-British personnel in the RAF during the Battle of Britain § United States
