= Andrew Mamedoff =

American pilot (1912–1941)

Andrew B Mamedoff
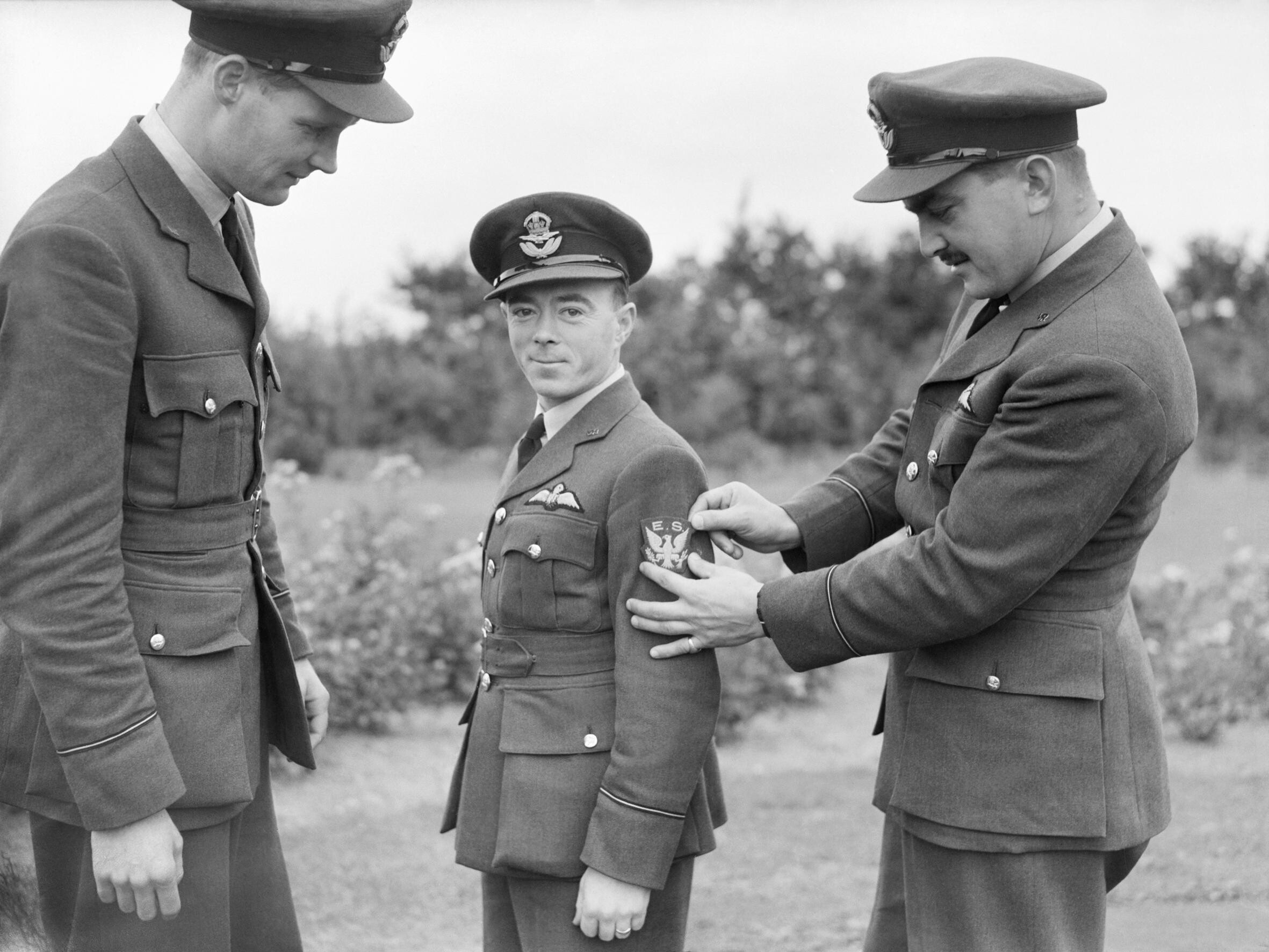
- Andrew Mamedoff (right) with Vernon Keough and Eugene Tobin, Church Fenton, Yorkshire, October 1940
- Born: 12 August 1912; Warsaw, Russian Empire
- Died: 8 October 1941 (aged 29) near Maughold, Isle of Man, England
- Burial place: Brookwood Military Cemetery
- Military career
- Allegiance: France; United Kingdom
- Branch: Royal Air Force
- Service years: 1940–1941
- Rank: Flight lieutenant
- Nickname: Andy
- Service number: 81621
- Units: No. 609 Squadron RAF; No. 71 Squadron RAF; No. 133 Squadron RAF
- Conflicts: World War II: European air campaign; Battle of Britain †

Flight lieutenant Andrew Beck Mamedoff (12 August 1912 – 8 October 1941), known as "Andy", was an American pilot who flew with the Royal Air Force during the Battle of Britain in World War II. He was one of eleven American pilots who flew with RAF Fighter Command between 10 July and 31 October 1940, thereby qualifying for the Battle of Britain clasp to the 1939–45 campaign star.

== Biography ==
He was born in Warsaw, Russian Empire, in 1911 to Lev Mamedoff and Natalia Mamedoff (née Vonsiatsky). His father was an officer in the Special Corps of Gendarmes of the Russian Empire stationed in Poland, while his uncle was Anastasy Vonsiatsky, a Russian fascist politician.

Mamedoff's family fled Russia after the Civil War, and lived in Europe for a short time. After Vonsiatsky had settled in Thompson, Connecticut, he convinced his wife to buy a neighboring farm for his sister's family.

In Thompson, Mamedoff attended Tourtellotte Memorial High School. He later enrolled in Bryant University.

He had learned to fly in the US and even had his own plane with which he performed at airshows. He and Eugene Tobin had been flying friends at Mines Field in California before the war. He was attempting to set up charter services in Miami immediately prior to the war. Mamedoff initially came to Europe to fight on the side of Finland against the Soviet Union, but hostilities had ceased before he arrived.

In 1941 Mamedoff married an English woman, Alys Laird "Penny" Mamedoff (née Crockatt) at Epping. He became the first American to take a war bride during World War II.

== Second World War ==
Mamedoff and his friends and fellow Americans Eugene Tobin and Vernon Keogh were among 32 pilots recruited by American soldier of fortune Charles Sweeny to join the French Air Force. However, by the time they reached France, Germany had already invaded the country. The trio made their way to England and joined the Royal Air Force in 1940. (Of the rest of Sweeny's recruits, four were killed, 11 were taken prisoner, and two others reached England.)

After converting to the Spitfire, Mamedoff was posted to RAF Middle Wallop and joined No. 609 Squadron on 8 August 1940. He was member of A Flight. On 24 August he took off at 16.10 as tail-end charlie. He was severely shot up by Me 109 and crashed at Tapnell Farm, near Freshwater flying in L1082.

He was posted to RAF Kirton in Lindsey in Lincolnshire on 18 September 1940 and was a founding member of the No. 71 'Eagle' Squadron along with Art Donahue, Eugene Tobin and Vernon Keogh. He was posted to RAF Duxford in August 1941 to another "Eagle Squadron", No. 133 Squadron as a flight commander.

=== Death ===
On 8 October 1941, Mamedoff was flying with 133 Squadron on a standard transit flight from Fowlmere Airfield to RAF Eglinton in Northern Ireland in his Hurricane Z3781. The wreckage of his plane was found near Maughold on the Isle of Man and it is thought that he crashed due to poor weather conditions. His body was later recovered for burial at Brookwood Military Cemetery in Surrey. He has been described as possibly the first Jewish American to have been killed in World War II.

== 2013 honoring by British Members of Parliament ==
In 2013, three Members of the British Parliament visited Bryant University to honor Mamedoff's memory. They presented the University President, Ronald K. Matchtley, with a plaque which says, in part, that Mamedoff's "participation in the Battle of Britain in 1940 helped to prevent the spread of Fascism throughout the World". In his remarks on accepting the plaque, President Matchtley said that Mamedoff:

. . . liked fast cars and was a daredevil, even as a student, adding that he was “expelled from Bryant on several occasions.” Rather than displaying the kind of character the college expected, Machtley said, “He was a character.”

== See also ==
- Eagle Squadrons
- List of RAF aircrew in the Battle of Britain
- Non-British personnel in the RAF during the Battle of Britain § United States
