= Leckrone =

Leckrone may refer to:

- Leckrone (surname)
- Leckrone, Pennsylvania
