= Eugene Tobin =

Royal Air Force pilot (1917–1941)

Eugene Quimby Tobin
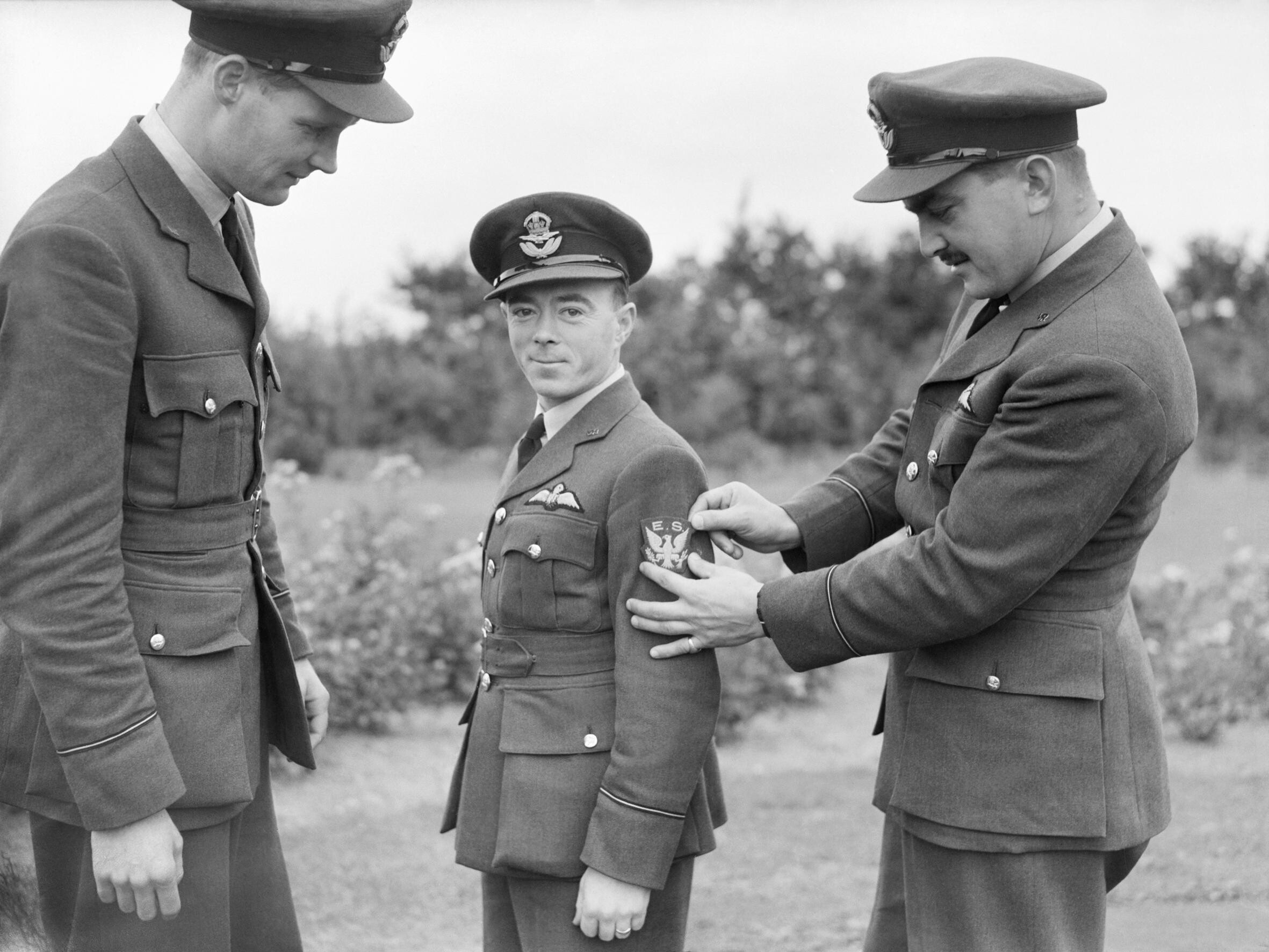
- Eugene Tobin (left) with Andrew Mamedoff (right) and Vernon Keough, Church Fenton, Yorkshire, October 1940
- Born: 4 January 1917; Salt Lake City, Utah, U.S.
- Died: 7 September 1941 (aged 24) near Boulogne-sur-Mer, German-occupied France
- Burial place: Boulogne Eastern Cemetery, France
- Military career
- Allegiance: France; United Kingdom
- Branch: France; Royal Air Force
- Service years: 1940–1941
- Rank: Flying Officer
- Nickname: Red
- Service number: 81622
- Units: No. 609 Squadron RAF; No. 71 Squadron RAF
- Conflicts: World War II: European air campaign †; Battle of Britain

Flying Officer Eugene Quimby "Red" Tobin (4 January 1917 – 7 September 1941) was an American pilot who flew with the Royal Air Force during the Battle of Britain in World War II. He was one of 11 American pilots who flew with RAF Fighter Command between 10 July and 31 October 1940, thereby qualifying for the Battle of Britain clasp to the 1939–45 campaign star.

== Early life ==
Born in Salt Lake City, Utah, but raised from early childhood in Los Angeles, California, the son of Ignatius Quimby Tobin and Mary Alicia Tobin (née O'Fallon). Tobin initially came to Europe to fight on the side of Finland against the Soviet Union's invasion of that country, but hostilities had ceased before he arrived. He was already a qualified pilot, having learned to fly in the 1930s.

Tobin and Andrew Mamedoff had been flying friends at Mines Field in California before the war.

== Second World War ==
Tobin and his friends and fellow Americans Andrew Mamedoff and Vernon Keogh were among 32 pilots recruited by American soldier of fortune Charles Sweeny to join the French Air Force. However, by the time they reached France, Germany had already invaded the country. The trio made their way to England and joined the Royal Air Force in 1940. (Of the rest of Sweeny's recruits, four were killed, 11 were taken prisoner, and two others reached England.)

On 8 August 1940 Tobin was posted to No. 609 Squadron RAF at Middle Wallop airfield. He flew his first mission on 16 August 1940. He flew many missions during the height of the Battle of Britain in August and September. He was credited with two shared kills – a Messerchmitt Bf 110 fighter on 25 August and a Dornier Do 17 bomber on 15 September.

He was posted to RAF Kirton in Lindsey in Lincolnshire on 18 September 1940 and was a founding member of the No. 71 'Eagle' Squadron along with Art Donahue, Andrew Mamedoff and Vernon Keogh.

After arriving in Britain Tobin had been diagnosed with lupus which at the time was an often fatal autoimmune disease, but kept his illness which reduced his stamina a secret so he could continue to fly for the RAF.

=== Death ===
On 7 September 1941, Tobin was killed in combat with Messerschmitt Bf 109s fighters of JG 26 on 71 Squadron's first sweep over northern France, one of three Supermarine Spitfires shot down, possibly hit by Joachim Muncheberg He crashed into a hillside near Boulogne-sur-Mer and was buried in Boulogne Eastern Cemetery, France. He was 24 years old.

== See also ==
- Eagle Squadrons
- List of RAF aircrew in the Battle of Britain
- Non-British personnel in the RAF during the Battle of Britain § United States
