= John Kenneth Haviland =

American pilot

- Born: 19 January 1921; Mount Kisco, New York, U.S.
- Died: 1 July 2002 (aged 81); Charlottesville, Virginia, U.S.
- Military career
- Allegiance: United Kingdom
- Branch: Royal Air Force
- Service years: 1940–1945
- Rank: Flight Lieutenant
- Service number: 82690
- Unit: No. 151 Squadron RAF
- Conflicts: World War II: Battle of Britain
- Awards: Distinguished Flying Cross
- Other work: Professor in Aerospace Engineering Department at the University of Virginia

John Kenneth Haviland DFC (19 January 1921 – 1 July 2002) was an American pilot who flew for the Royal Air Force during the Battle of Britain. He was one of 9 American pilots who flew with RAF Fighter Command between 10 July and 31 October 1940, thereby qualifying for the Battle of Britain clasp to the 1939–45 campaign star.

== Early life ==
Born in Mount Kisco, New York, the son of a US Navy officer and an English mother. He was educated in England from the age of five and was educated at the University of Nottingham and the University of London. He joined the Royal Air Force Reserve in July 1939 and was called up for war service in September of the same year.

== World War II ==
Haviland undertook flying training at No. 10 Flying Training School and was posted to No. 1 (Army Co-Operation) Squadron at Old Sarum near Salisbury. In August 1940 he volunteered to serve with RAF Fighter Command and, following a conversion course at No. 6 OTU was posted to RAF Digby to join No. 151 Squadron RAF flying Hurricanes on 23 September 1940.

Haviland was involved in a mid-air collision on 24 September during formation flying practice which resulted in a force-landing in a paddock in the village of Waddington, Lincolnshire. Haviland would see no further significant action in the Battle of Britain.

Haviland served throughout the war, doing tours as an instructor, intruder operations and bomber support. He was awarded the Distinguished Flying Cross on 16 February 1945, by when he was a flight lieutenant flying with No. 141 Squadron RAF.

== Postwar career ==
After the war he moved to Canada before obtaining a PhD from Massachusetts Institute of Technology and becoming a professor in engineering in the Mechanical and Aerospace Engineering Department at the University of Virginia, specialising in aerospace projects.

== Honors and awards ==
- 16 February 1945 – Awarded the Distinguished Flying Cross John Kenneth Haviland (82690), R.A.F.V.R., 141

Sqn:

== See also ==
- List of RAF aircrew in the Battle of Britain
- Non-British personnel in the RAF during the Battle of Britain § United States
