= Vernon Keough =

American World War II RAF pilot

Vernon Charles Keough
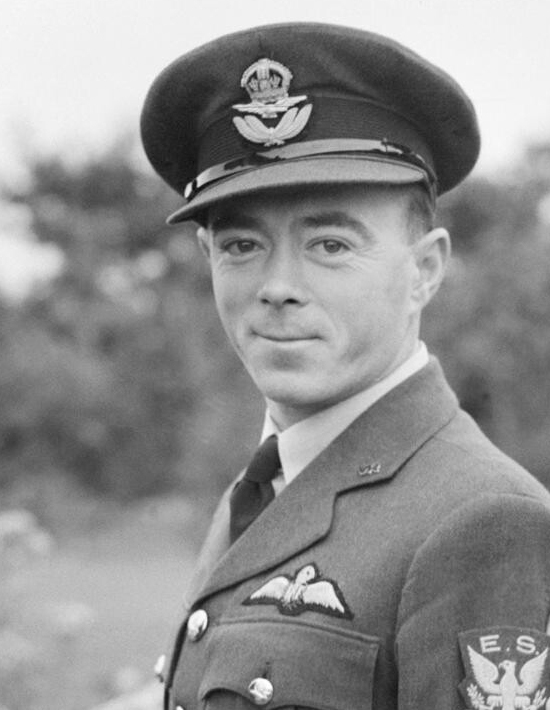
- Pilot Officer Vernon Keough at RAF Church Fenton, Yorkshire, October 1940
- Born: 8 June 1911; Elizabeth, New Jersey, U.S.
- Died: 15 February 1941 (aged 29) off Flamborough Head, East Yorkshire, England
- Military career
- Allegiance: France; United Kingdom
- Branch: France; Royal Air Force
- Service years: 1940–1941
- Rank: Pilot Officer
- Nickname: Shorty
- Service number: 81620
- Units: No. 609 Squadron RAF; No. 71 Squadron RAF
- Conflicts: World War II: European air campaign †; Battle of Britain

Pilot Officer Vernon Charles "Shorty" Keough (8 June 1911 – 15 February 1941) was an American pilot who flew with the Royal Air Force during the Battle of Britain in World War II. He was one of 11 American pilots who flew with RAF Fighter Command between 10 July and 31 October 1940, thereby qualifying for the Battle of Britain clasp to the 1939–45 campaign star.

== Biography ==
Born in Elizabeth, New Jersey on 8 June 1911, Keough was the son of Charles K. Nezu and Constance Theresa Keough. He earned a civil pilot's license in America and was also a professional parachute jumper with over 500 jumps, performing at air shows across America.

== Second World War ==
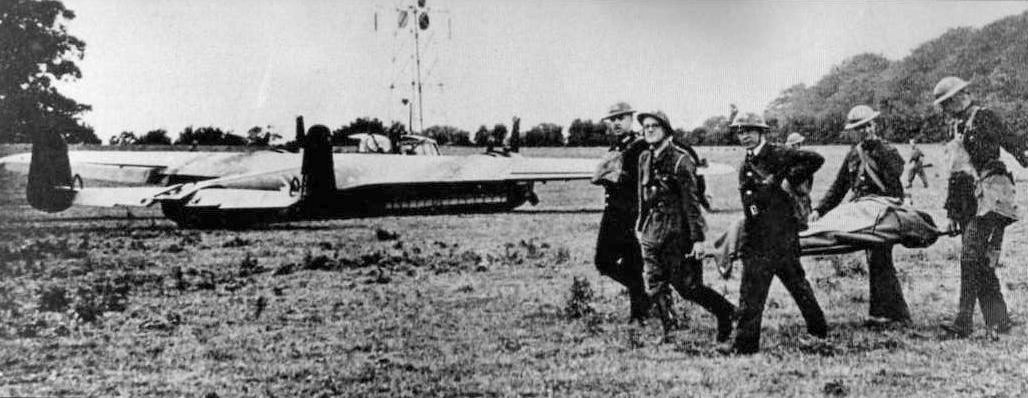
The Dornier 17 shot down by Keough, John Dundas and Mike Appleby on 15 September 1940. One of the German crew, Feldwebel Pfeiffer, is being carried on a stretcher

Keough and his friends and fellow Americans Andrew Mamedoff and Eugene Tobin were among 32 pilots recruited by American soldier of fortune Charles Sweeny to join the French Air Force. However, by the time they reached France, Germany had already invaded the country. The trio made their way to England and joined the Royal Air Force in 1940. (Of the rest of Sweeny's recruits, four were killed, 11 were taken prisoner, and two others reached England.)

Keough was the smallest pilot in the whole of the Royal Air Force, hence the nickname, and was just 4 ft 10 in (147 cm) tall. He had to use two cushions in his Spitfire to see out of the cockpit. On 8 August 1940 Keough was posted to No. 609 Squadron RAF at Middle Wallop airfield. He flew many missions during the height of the Battle of Britain in August and September. He was credited with one shared kill: Dornier Do 17 bomber shot down on 15 September with Pilot Officer Mike Appleby and Flight lieutenant John Dundas.

He was posted to RAF Kirton in Lindsey in Lincolnshire on 18 September 1940 and was a founding member of No. 71 'Eagle' Squadron along with Art Donahue, Andrew Mamedoff, and Eugene Tobin.

=== Death ===
On 15 February 1941, Keough was on a convoy-protection mission off Flamborough Head, East Yorkshire. During the chase of a Heinkel He 111, he was last seen spinning off into the sea. He may have been a victim of disorientation in cloud or oxygen failure. He was 29 years old. His body was not recovered, but he is remembered on the Air Forces Memorial at Runnymede.

== See also ==
- Eagle Squadrons
- List of RAF aircrew in the Battle of Britain
- Non-British personnel in the RAF during the Battle of Britain § United States
