= Eagle Squadrons =

World War II military units

- RAF Eagle Squadron Emblem, 1940
- Active: 19 September 1940 – 29 September 1942
- Country: United Kingdom
- Allegiance: United Kingdom; United States (September 1942)
- Branch: Royal Air Force

Aircraft flown
- Fighter: Miles Master; Hawker Hurricane; Supermarine Spitfire

The Eagle Squadrons were three fighter squadrons of the Royal Air Force (RAF) formed with volunteer pilots from the United States during the early days of World War II (1940), prior to the United States' entry into the war in December 1941.

With the United States still neutral, many Americans simply crossed the border and joined the Royal Canadian Air Force (RCAF) to learn to fly and fight. Many early recruits had originally gone to Europe to fight for Finland against the Soviet Union in the Winter War.

Charles Sweeny, a wealthy businessman living in London, persuaded the British Government to form an RAF squadron composed of Americans. (His uncle, also named Charles Sweeny, had been working along similar lines, recruiting American pilots to fight in France.) Sweeny's efforts were also coordinated in Canada by the World War I air ace Billy Bishop and the artist Clayton Knight, who formed the Clayton Knight Committee, which by the time the United States entered the war, had processed and approved 6,700 applications from Americans to join the RCAF or RAF. Sweeny and his rich society contacts bore the cost (over $100,000) of processing and sending the men to the United Kingdom for training.

== Training ==
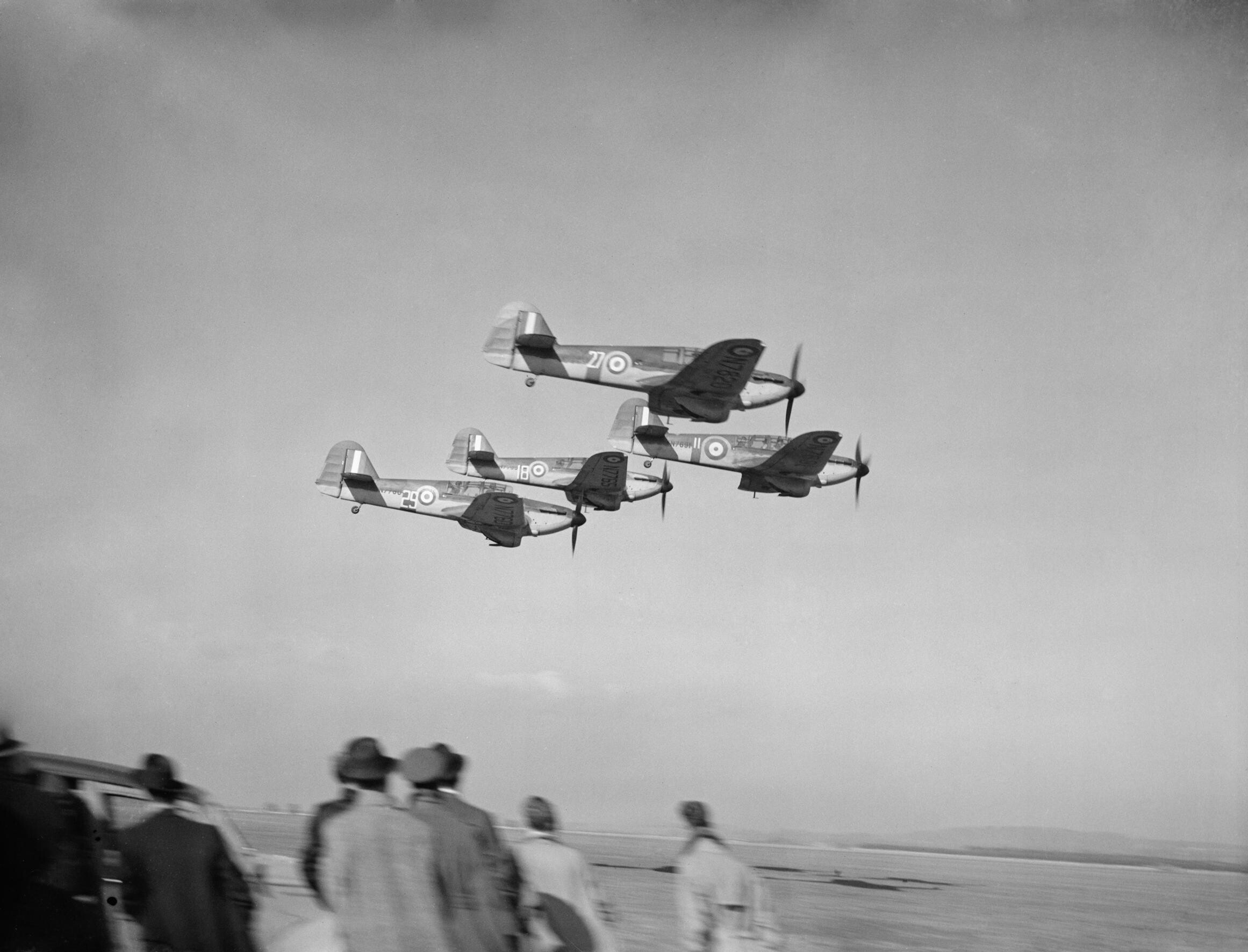
Miles Masters of No. 5 Service Flying Training School, flown by volunteers for No. 71 (Eagle) Squadron

The basic requirements for joining the Eagle Squadron were a high school diploma, age 20 to 31 years, visual acuity of 20/40 correctable to 20/20, and 300 hours of certified flying time. These requirements, with the exception of the flight time, were not as strict as those required for service in the United States Army Air Corps, which was why some of the pilots joined the squadron. Most Eagle Squadron pilots did not have a college education or prior military experience.

Once in Britain and having passed basic flight training, the new pilots were sent for advanced operational training to an operational training unit (OTU) for two to four weeks to learn to fly Miles Master trainers, Hawker Hurricanes, and Supermarine Spitfires before being ostensibly commissioned as RAF officers and posted to front-line RAF fighter squadrons. The American pilots assigned to the Eagle Squadrons never renounced their US citizenship and although they wore the uniforms and held the rank titles of RAF officers, their dress and duty uniform tunics were modified with the Eagle Squadron patch, a white bald eagle flanked by the letters "ES" for Eagle Squadron.

== Formation and evolution ==
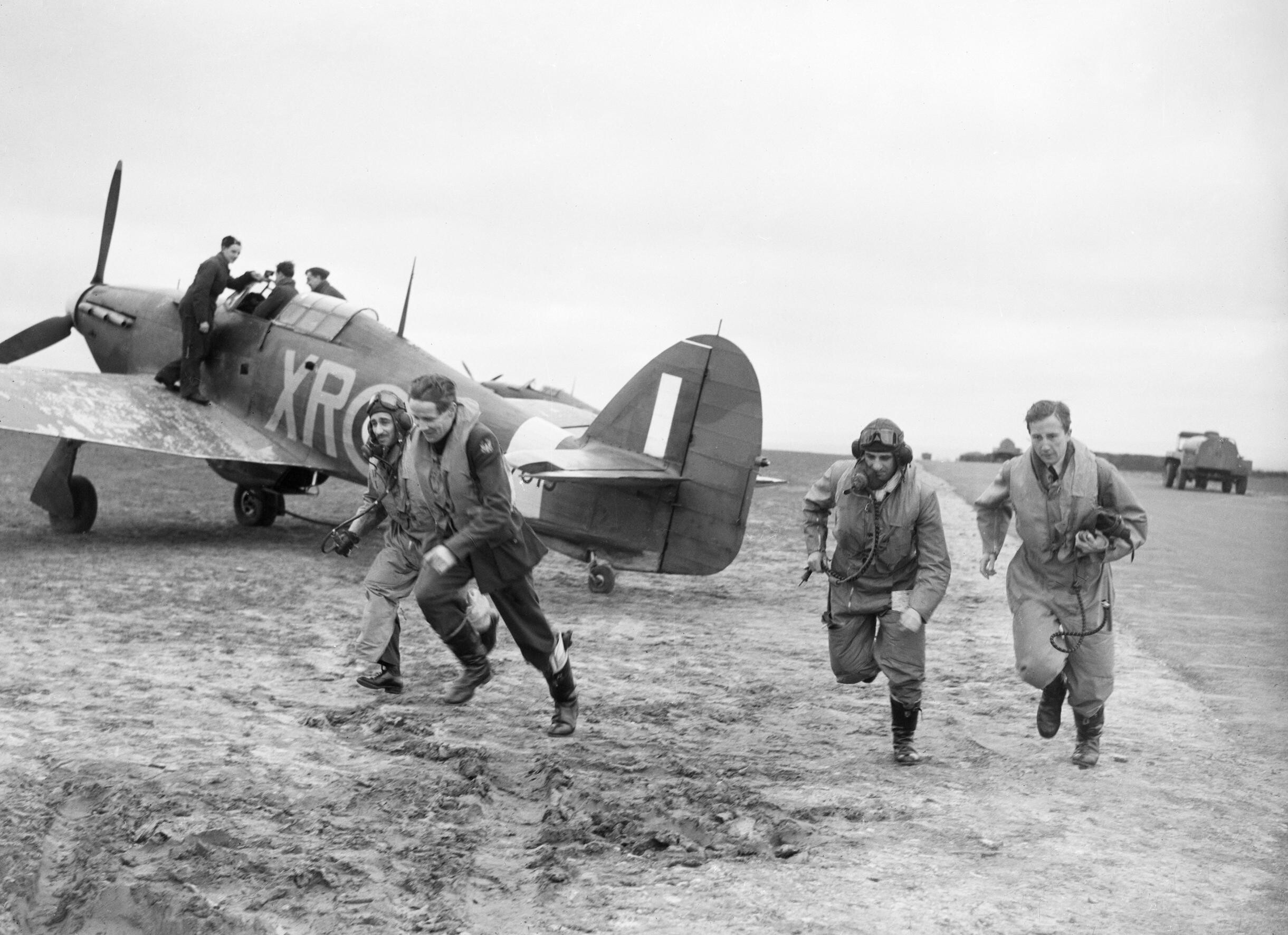
American pilots of 71 Eagle Squadron rush to their Hawker Hurricanes at Kirton-in-Lindsey, 17 March 1941.

Three Eagle Squadrons were formed between September 1940 and July 1941. On 29 September 1942, they were turned over to the Eighth Air Force of the U.S. Army Air Forces and became the 4th Fighter Group. Of the thousands who volunteered, only 244 Americans served with the Eagle Squadrons. Sixteen Britons also served as squadron and flight commanders. The first Eagle Squadron, 71 Squadron, was formed in September 1940 as part of the RAF's buildup during the Battle of Britain and became operational for defensive duties on 5 February 1941. 71 Squadron commenced operations based at RAF Church Fenton in early 1941, before a move to RAF Kirton-in-Lindsey. In April, the squadron transferred to RAF Martlesham Heath in Suffolk for operations over Europe. During May, it suffered its first loss when Mike Kolendorski was killed during a fighter sweep over the Netherlands. The intensity of operations stepped up with a move into 11 Group, Fighter Command, being based at RAF North Weald by June 1941. On June 21, 1941, 22 year-old Nathaniel Maranz became the first American pilot to become a prisoner of war when he was shot down by a Bf 109 over the English Channel and picked up by a German patrol boat after swimming for an hour and a half. He was a prisoner in Stalag Luft III. The squadron's first confirmed victory came on 21 July 1941 when P/O William R. Dunn destroyed a Messerschmitt Bf 109F over Lille. In August, 71 Squadron replaced its Hurricanes and Spitfire Mk IIs, before quickly re-equipping with the latest Spitfire Mk Vs. The unit soon established a high reputation and numerous air kill claims were made in RAF fighter sweeps over the continent during the summer and autumn of 1941. In December, the squadron was rested back at Martlesham Heath, before a move to Debden in May 1942.

The second Eagle Squadron, 121 Squadron, was formed at RAF Kirton-in-Lindsey in May 1941, flying Hurricanes on coastal convoy escort duties. On 15 September 1941, it destroyed its first German aircraft. The Hurricanes were replaced with Spitfires and Spitfire Mk Vs arrived in November 1941. The following month, the squadron moved to RAF North Weald, replacing 71 Squadron. In 1942, its offensive activities over the English Channel included bomber escorts and fighter sweeps.

The third and final Eagle Squadron, 133 Squadron, was formed at RAF Coltishall in July 1941, flying the Hurricane Mk IIb. A move to RAF Duxford followed in August, and re-equipment with the Spitfire Mk V occurred early in 1942. In May, the squadron became part of the famed RAF Biggin Hill Wing. On 31 July 1942, during a bomber escort mission to Abbeville, 133 Squadron Spitfires fought 52-kill Luftwaffe 'ace' Oblt. Rudolf Pflanz of 11./JG 2 in combat; after shooting down one, Pflanz was shot down and killed in his Messerschmitt Bf 109G-1 over Berck-sur-Mer, France. 133 Squadron claimed three destroyed and one probable, while losing three aircraft. P/O "Jessie" Taylor accounted for two of the claims (a Bf 109F and an Focke-Wulf Fw 190) and P/O W. Baker was credited with a Fw 190 destroyed. On 26 September 1942, 11 of the unit's 12 brand new Spitfire Mk IXs were lost on a mission over Morlaix while escorting USAAF Boeing B-17 Flying Fortresses in heavy cloud cover. Strong winds blew the unit further south than realised and, short of fuel, the squadron let down directly over Brest. Six pilots were shot down and taken prisoner, four were killed, one bailed out and evaded capture, while one crash landed in England. One of the British pilots taken prisoner, Flight Lieutenant Gordon Brettell, was later to be shot as one of the escapees in The Great Escape from Stalag Luft III in 1944.

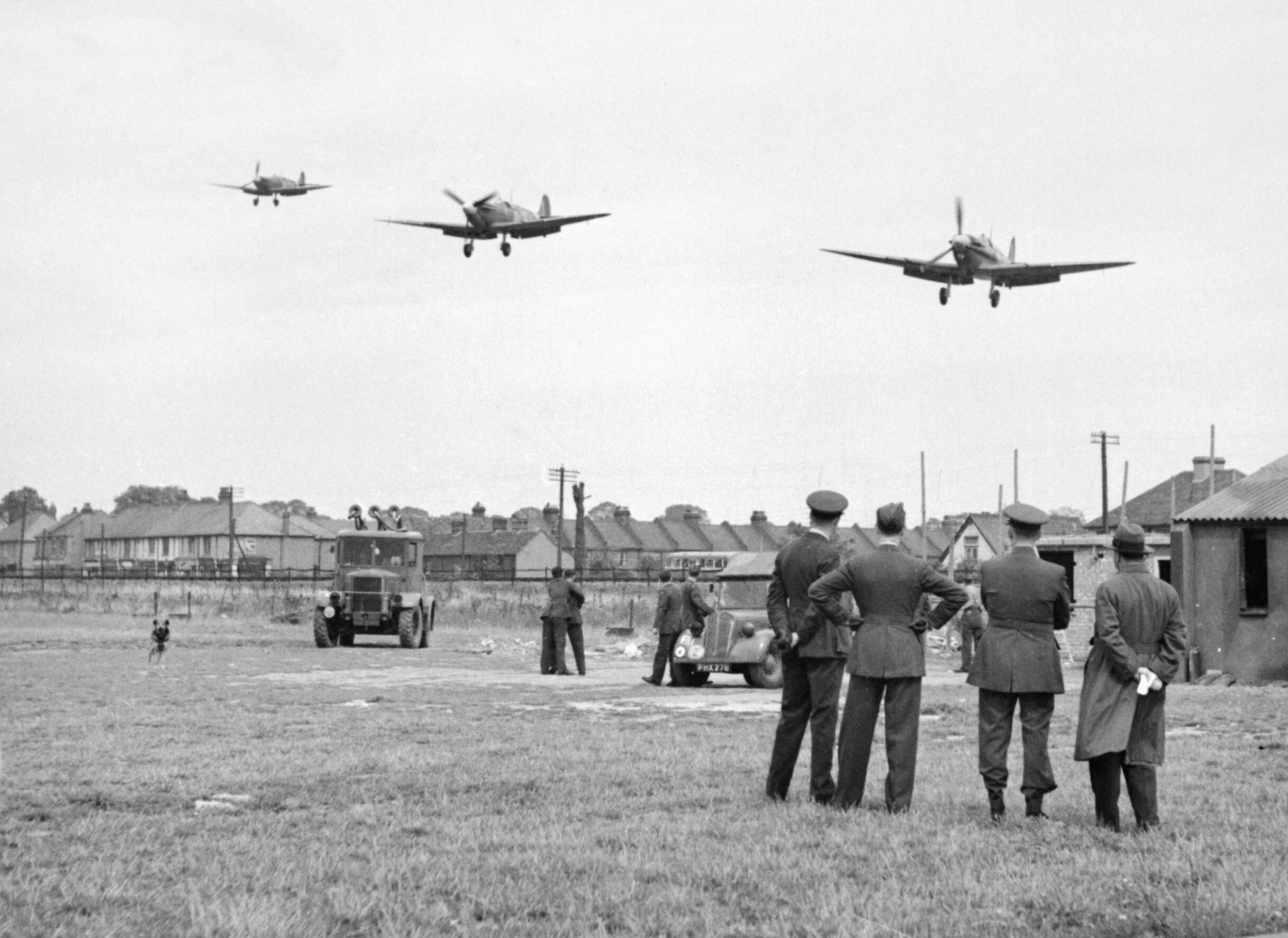
Personnel of 121 Squadron look on as three Spitfire Vbs come in to land at RAF Rochford in Essex, after a fighter sweep over northern France during August 1942.

The Dieppe Raid was the only time all three Eagle Squadrons saw action operating together. 71 Squadron moved from Debden to Gravesend in mid-August in anticipation of the Dieppe action, while 121 Squadron operated from Southend. 133 Squadron moved with 401 Squadron RCAF from RAF Biggin Hill to Lympne on the English south coast. 71 Squadron claimed a Ju 88 shot down, 121 Squadron an Fw 190, while 133 Squadron claimed four Fw 190s, a Ju 88 and a Dornier Do 217. Six 'Eagle' Spitfires were lost, with one pilot taken prisoner and one killed. Through to the end of September 1942, the squadrons claimed to have destroyed 73½ German aircraft while 77 American and 5 British members were killed. 71 Squadron claimed 41 kills, 121 Squadron 18 and 133 Squadron 14½.

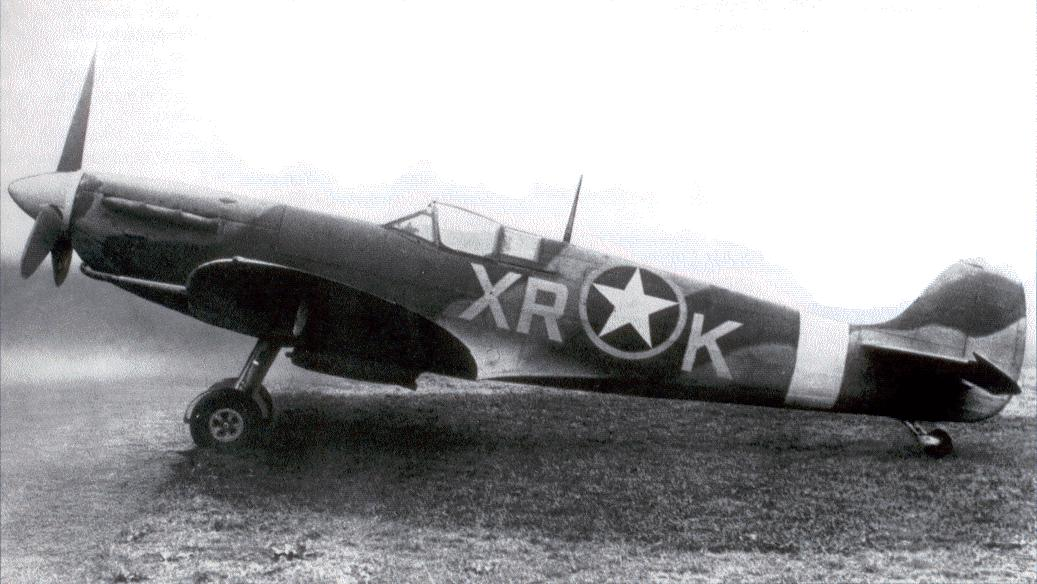
Spitfire Mk Vb of the 334th Fighter Squadron, 4th Fighter Group, previously of 71 Squadron.

When informed of the attack on Pearl Harbor, most of the Eagle Squadron pilots wanted to immediately join the fight against Imperial Japan. Representatives from 71 and 121 Squadrons went to the American embassy in London and offered their services to the United States. The pilots from 71 Squadron decided they wanted to go to Singapore to fight the Japanese and a proposal was put to RAF Fighter Command, but it was turned down.

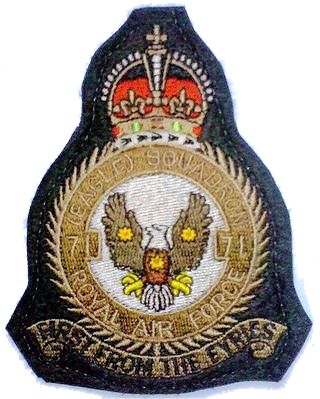
71 Eagle Squadron crest

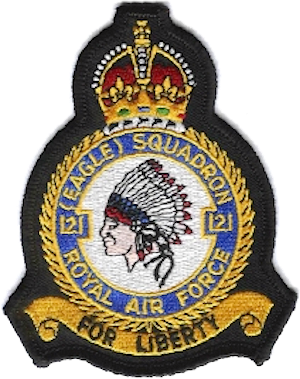
121 Eagle Squadron crest

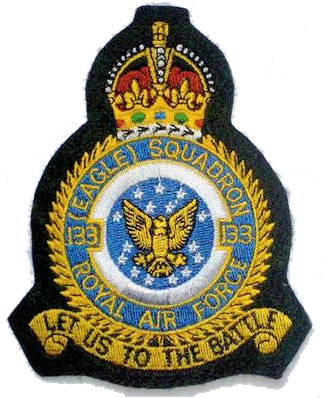
133 Eagle Squadron crest

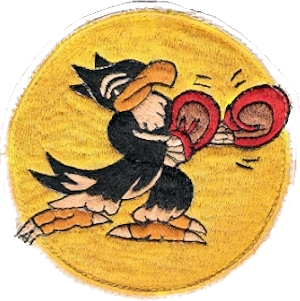
334th Fighter Squadron

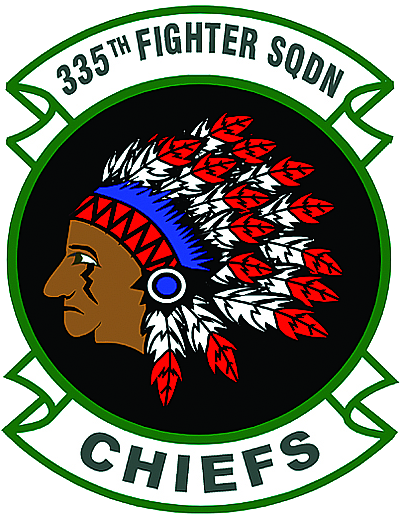
335th Fighter Squadron

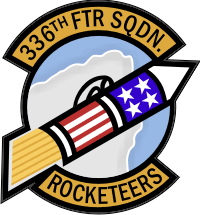
336th Fighter Squadron

On 29 September 1942, the three squadrons were transferred from the RAF to the Eighth Air Force of the United States Army Air Forces, with the American pilots becoming officers in the USAAF. The Eagle pilots had earned 12 Distinguished Flying Crosses and one Distinguished Service Order. Only four of the 34 original Eagle pilots were still present when the squadrons joined the USAAF. Typical were the fates of the eight original pilots in the third squadron: four died during training, one was disqualified, two died in combat, and one became a prisoner of war. About 100 Eagle pilots had been killed, were missing or were prisoners.

Negotiations regarding the transfer between the Eagle Squadrons, the USAAF and the RAF had to resolve a number of matters. The RAF wanted some compensation for losing three front-line squadrons. Determining what rank each pilot would assume in the USAAF also had to be negotiated, with most being given a rank equivalent to their RAF rank. For example, a flight lieutenant became a USAAF captain, while a wing commander became a lieutenant colonel. None of the Eagle Squadron pilots had previously served in the USAAF and did not have US pilot wings. As such, it was decided that they be awarded USAAF pilot wings upon their transfer. Due to their insistence, the Eagle Squadron pilots who transferred to the USAAF 4th Fighter Group were permitted to retain their RAF wings, reduced in size, on the opposite side of their uniform to their new USAAF pilots wings.

Major General Carl Spaatz, head of the USAAF in Europe, wanted to spread the experience of the Eagles amongst various new US fighter squadrons, but the pilots of the three Eagle Squadrons wanted to stay together. 71, 121, and 133 Squadrons were renamed by the USAAF as the 334th, 335th and 336th and transferred as complete units, retaining their Spitfires until P-47 Thunderbolts became available in January 1943. The 4th Fighter Group flew Spitfires until its conversion to P-47s was completed in April 1943. All three units had switched to the P-51 Mustang by the second half of March 1944. The 4th Fighter Wing, along with the 334th, 335th and 336th Fighter Squadrons, exist today as F-15E Strike Eagle units at Seymour Johnson Air Force Base in Goldsboro, North Carolina and are part of the Fifteenth Air Force.

== Individual pilots ==
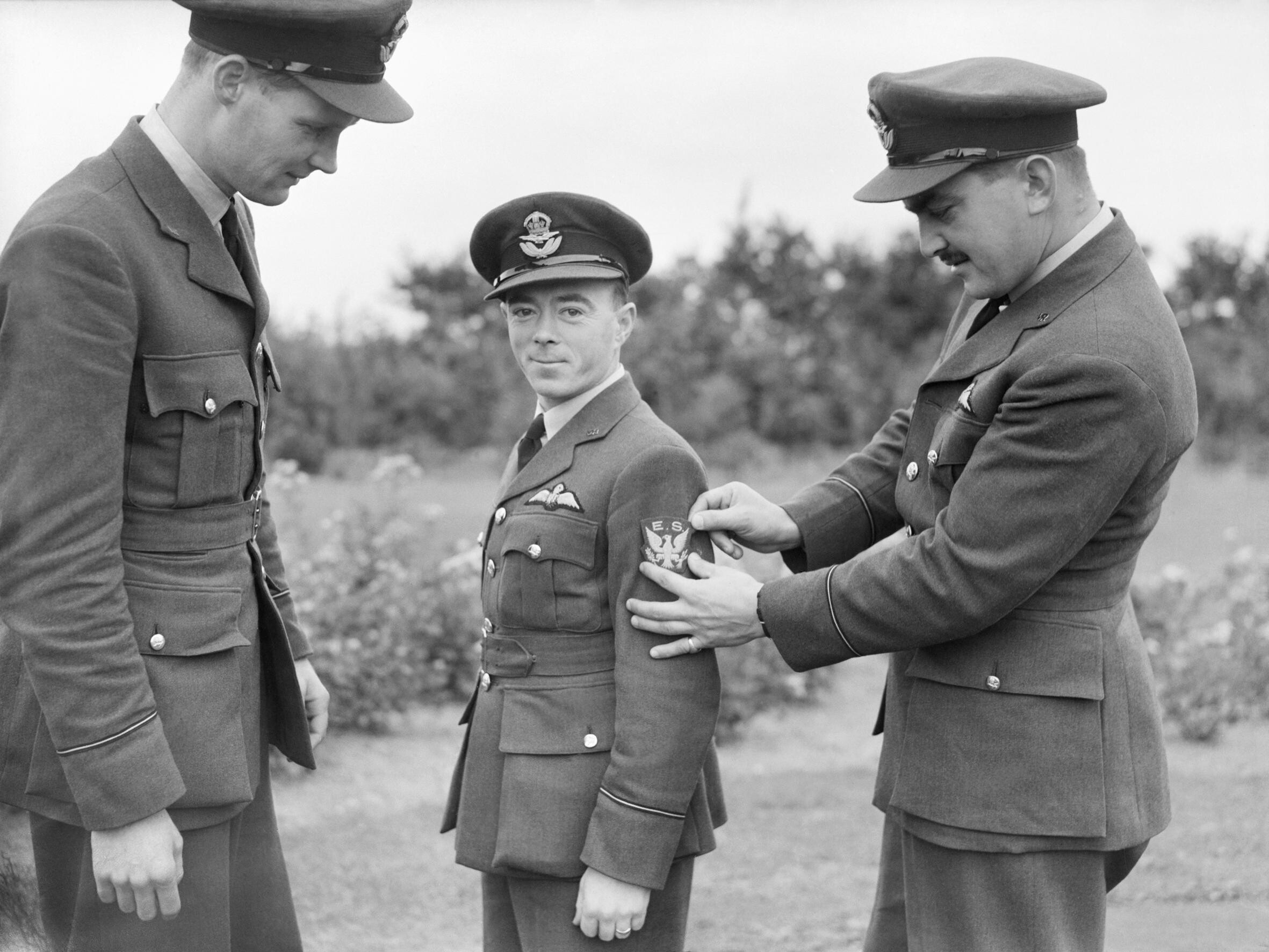
The first three members of the Eagle Squadrons (left to right): Andrew Mamedoff, Vernon Keough and Eugene Tobin, Church Fenton, Yorkshire, October 1940

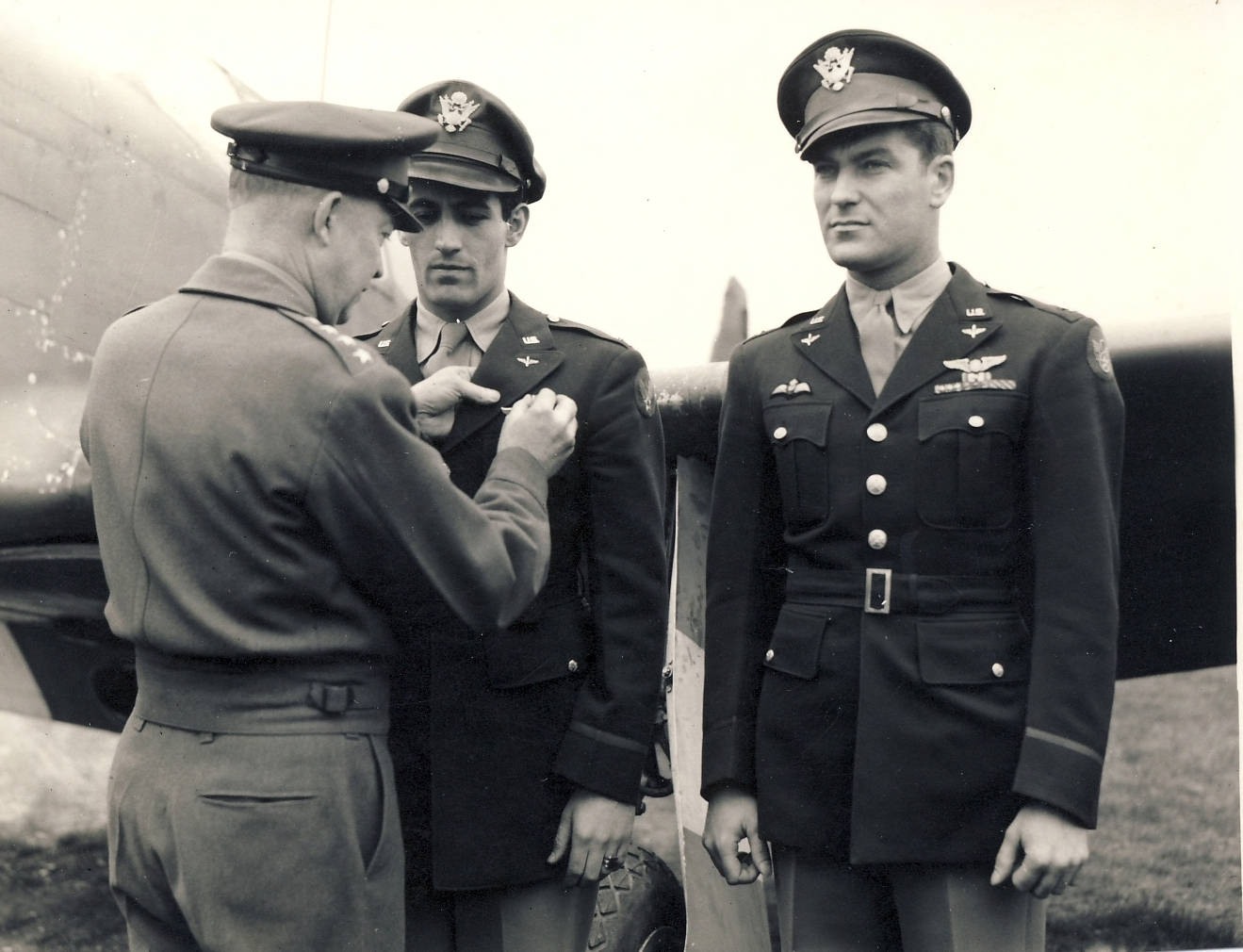
General Dwight D. Eisenhower awards the Distinguished Service Cross to Captain Don Gentile (left) and Colonel Donald Blakeslee on 11 April 1944.

The first three members of the Eagle Squadrons were:

- Vernon Charles "Shorty" Keough, service number 81620
- Andrew B. Mamedoff, service number 81621
- Eugene Quimby "Red" Tobin, service number 81622

All three had served together in No. 609 Squadron RAF, at RAF Middle Wallop. They had joined the RAF Volunteer Reserve (RAFVR) together (receiving consecutive service numbers), were posted to No. 609 Squadron RAF together, fought in the Battle of Britain together, and were transferred to 71 Squadron together in September 1940. The trio had also all been killed by the time of the transfer of the Eagle Squadrons to the USAAF in 1942 (from the database of the Commonwealth War Graves Commission (CWGC):

- Pilot Officer Keough was killed in February 1941, age 29
- Flight Lieutenant Mamedoff was killed in October 1941, age 29, after he had been transferred, with a promotion to be a flight commander, to another Eagle Squadron, No. 133 Squadron
- Flying Officer Tobin was killed in September 1941, age 24

Phillip Leckrone, service number 84653, was another Battle of Britain veteran. He was also killed before the USAAF took charge of the Eagle Squadrons. Pilot Officer Leckrone was killed in January 1941, age 28.

The lives of these four pilots have been described in The Few by Alex Kershaw.

It is reported that Pilot Officer Art Donahue DFC stayed with the Eagle Squadron only a short time before requesting a transfer back to his original RAF unit. He did not appreciate the unruly behavior of many of the American pilots. He was killed in action in 1942.

Captain Don Gentile was a pilot with 133 Squadron, claiming two air victories, and by March 1944 had become the 4th Fighter Group's top ace in World War II, with 22 aerial kills.

Colonel Chesley "Pete" Peterson had 130 sorties with the Eagle Squadrons and became the youngest squadron commander in the RAF. When the Eagle Squadrons were transferred to the 4th Fighter Group, Peterson became the group's executive officer, succeeding to command of the group in April 1943, and becoming at 23 the youngest (at the time) colonel in the USAAF.

Colonel Donald Blakeslee was a pilot in 121 and 133 Squadrons during 1942, making 120 sorties and claiming three aerial kills. He became deputy commander of the 4th Fighter Group under Chesley Peterson, then commanded the group from January to October 1944.

== Honours ==
The Eagle Squadrons Memorial is located on Grosvenor Square opposite a statue of Franklin D. Roosevelt.

British composer Kenneth J. Alford wrote a march, "Eagle Squadron", in honour of the pilots of the squadron. It is also a "thank you" to the American pilots: small sections of the Star Spangled Banner can be heard in the low brass during the trio.

== See also ==
- Condor Legion – Germans who fought for the Nationalists during the Spanish Civil War
- Flying Tigers – American volunteers who fought for the Republic of China in the Sino-Japanese War (1937–1945)
- Lafayette Escadrille – American volunteers in the French Air Service during World War I
- Non-British personnel in the RAF during the Battle of Britain
- Kościuszko Squadron – American volunteers fighting for Poland in the Polish–Soviet War (1919–1921)
