= Tourtellotte Memorial High School =

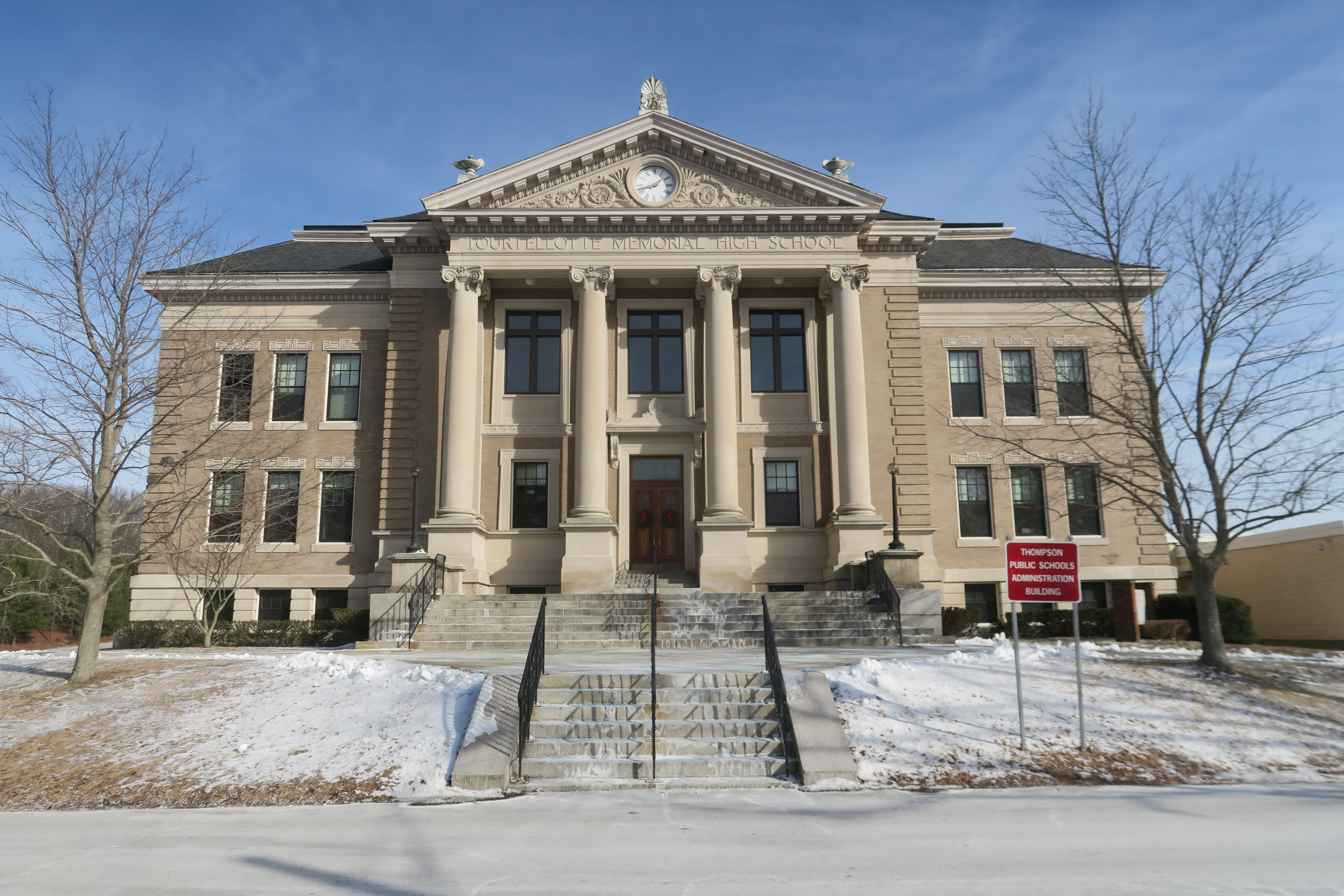

Location
- 785 Riverside Drive; North Grosvenordale, Connecticut 06255; United States
- Coordinates: 41°58′38″N 71°53′57″W

Information
- Type: Public school
- CEEB code: 070565
- Principal: Dr. Nathaniel Mayo
- Grades: 6-12
- Enrollment: 215 (2023-2024)
- Color
- Athletics conference: Eastern Connecticut Conference
- Team name: Tigers
- Website: tmhs.thompsonk12.org

Tourtellotte Memorial High School is located in North Grosvenordale, Connecticut, a village within the town of Thompson, Connecticut.

== Notable alumni ==
- Al LeBoeuf, baseball coach
- Andrew Mamedoff, fighter pilot in the Battle of Britain
