= Derek Teden =

England international rugby union player (1916–1940)

Derek Edmund Teden (19 July 1916 – 15 October 1940) was an English rugby union player. He won three caps in the 1939 Home Nations Championship. During the Second World War he served as a pilot officer with the RAF Coastal Command, and disappeared in 1940 on an anti-invasion patrol with No. 206 Squadron RAF. He is commemorated on the Runnymede Memorial.
