= Leckrone (surname) =

Leckrone is a surname. Notable people with the surname include:

- Michael Leckrone (born 1936), American marching band director
- Phillip Leckrone (1912–1941), American pilot
- Walter Leckrone (1897–1964), American newspaper editor
