= Air Forces Memorial =

Memorial in Surrey, England

Air Forces Memorial, Runnymede
- Commonwealth War Graves Commission
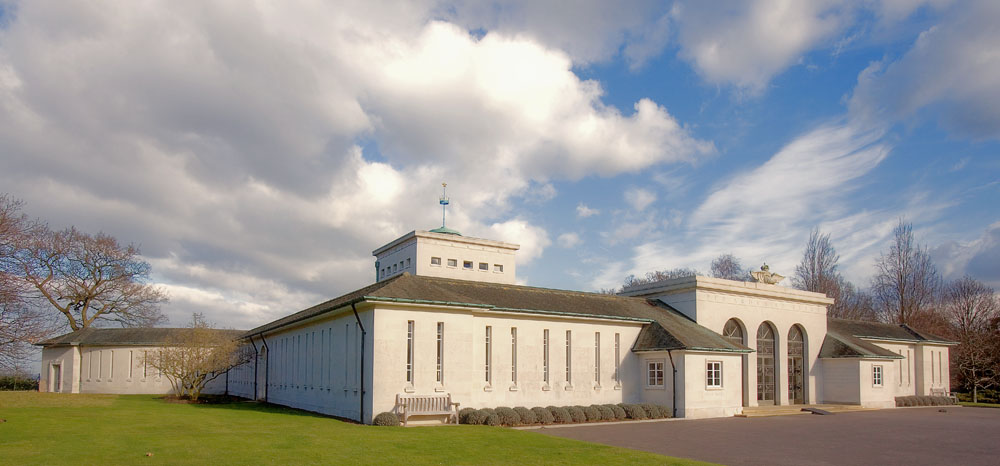
- Showing portico entrance, look-out wing and astral crown surmounting the central chapel.
- For Commonwealth Air Forces dead of World War II with no known grave
- Unveiled: 17 October 1953 by HM Queen Elizabeth II
- Location: 51°26′16″N 0°33′54″W near Egham Surrey England
- Designed by: Edward Maufe
- Commemorated: Over 20,000 Commonwealth Air Forces personnel including those with acting RAF, AuxAF or WAAF rank such as SOE operatives

The Air Forces Memorial, or Runnymede Memorial, in Englefield Green, near Egham, Surrey, England is a memorial dedicated to some 20,456 men and women from air forces of the British Empire who were lost in air and other operations during World War II. Those recorded have no known grave anywhere in the world, and many were lost without trace. The name of each of these airmen and airwomen is engraved into the stone walls of the memorial, according to country and squadron.

== Design ==
The memorial was commissioned and is maintained by the Commonwealth War Graves Commission. The architect was Sir Edward Maufe with sculpture by Vernon Hill. The engraved glass and painted ceilings were designed by John Hutton, and the poem engraved on the gallery window was written by Paul H Scott. It was the first post-World War II building to be listed for architectural merit.

From the memorial there are views over the River Thames and Runnymede Meadow, where Magna Carta was sealed by King John in 1215. Distant views of London may be had from the viewpoint in the memorial tower; such monuments as the London Eye and the arch of Wembley Stadium are visible on clear days. Windsor Castle and the surrounding area can be seen to the West.

== Location ==
The memorial is on Coopers Hill Lane, Englefield Green, next to the former Runnymede campus of Brunel University and the now defunct Kingswood Hall.

== Status ==
It is a Grade II* listed building and was completed in 1953.

== People memorialised ==
Amongst the many thousands of airmen and women whose names are recorded on the Memorial are:

- Flight Sergeant Edwin Watson, Scottish air gunner and professional footballer known as the Flying Fifer
- Flight Lieutenant Howard Peter Blatchford, Canadian Battle of Britain veteran pilot
- Flying Officer David Moore Crook, fighter pilot
- Flight Lieutenant Arthur ('Art') Donahue, American RAF Flying ace, author
- Flight Lieutenant John Dundas, flying ace
- Wing Commander Brendan (Paddy) Finucane, flying ace
- Squadron Leader Hilary Hood, Battle of Britain pilot casualty
- First Officer ATA Amy Johnson, aviator
- Pilot Officer Vernon ('Shorty') Keogh, American RAF Battle of Britain pilot
- Assistant Section Officer Noor Inayat Khan, GC recipient, SOE agent
- Sergeant Leslie Lack, pre-war Arsenal F.C. football player
- Flight Lieutenant Eric Lock, flying ace
- Pilot Officer William (Willie) McKnight, Canadian flying ace
- Wing Commander John Dering Nettleton, VC recipient
- Pilot Officer Esmond Romilly, anti-fascist writer
- Pilot Officer Derek Teden, England rugby international
- Wing Commander Alois Vasatko, Czech flying ace
- Squadron Leader Geoffrey Warnes of No. 263 Squadron RAF

== See also ==
- Grade II* listed war memorials in England
