= Non-British personnel in the RAF during the Battle of Britain =

Royal Air Force pilots during WW2

The Royal Air Force (RAF) and Fleet Air Arm had included personnel from outside the United Kingdom since before the beginning of the Second World War, and many served in the Battle of Britain in summer 1940. Many of these volunteers were British subjects—thus, citizens—coming from territories within the British Empire. Additionally, there were significant numbers of refugees and exiles from German-occupied Europe, as well as American emigrants.

The RAF Roll of Honour recognises 574 pilots, from countries other than the United Kingdom, as having flown at least one authorised, operational sortie with an eligible unit during the period between 10 July and 31 October 1940, alongside 2,353 British pilots. The numbers differ slightly from those of the participants whose names are engraved on the Battle of Britain Monument in London, unveiled on 18 September 2005.

All pilots, regardless of nationality, who flew with British units during the Battle are known collectively, after a phrase coined by Winston Churchill, as "The Few".

== Background ==
Prior to the outbreak of war, in view of the worsening European situation, the RAF had embarked on a series of expansion plans. These included Short-Service Commissions for pilots from the air forces of other British Commonwealth countries, namely Australia, Canada, New Zealand, South Africa and Southern Rhodesia.

The governments of Australia, Canada, New Zealand and the UK, under an agreement signed in December 1939, created the British Commonwealth Air Training Plan (BCATP), also known as the Empire Air Training Scheme. The plan had three main effects: first, joint military aircrew training facilities were set up in each member country, as well as Southern Rhodesia; second, these air forces also formed a common pool of aircrew and ground staff, who were posted to units according to operational needs and regardless of nationality; and third, under Article XV of the agreement, the Royal Australian Air Force (RAAF), Royal Canadian Air Force (RCAF) and Royal New Zealand Air Force (RNZAF) formed squadrons for service under RAF operational control. These so-called "Article XV squadrons" were given numbers in the 400-series, to avoid confusion with RAF units. Other squadrons from Dominion air forces served under RAF control during the Battle and other units, composed mostly of RAAF, RCAF and RNZAF personnel, were formed within the RAF itself. Most of these squadrons and personnel were still in training and/or were not involved in fighter operations during the Battle of Britain, although No. 1 Squadron RCAF took part in operations from August 1940.

State of origin	Number	Ref
Poland	145–146	
New Zealand	127–135	
Canada	112	
Czechoslovakia	84–88	
Belgium	28–30	
Australia	26–32	
South Africa	22–25	
Free France	13–14	
Republic of Ireland	10	
United States	9–11	
Southern Rhodesia	3–4	
Barbados	1	
Jamaica	1	
Newfoundland	1	
Northern Rhodesia	1	

== Contribution by country ==
=== Australia ===
When the war began, about 450 Australian pilots were serving in the RAF.

Australia was among the first countries to declare war on Germany and the Royal Australian Air Force (RAAF) was among the world's oldest air forces, having been formed in 1921; a predecessor, the Australian Flying Corps served during the First World War, in the Middle East and Europe, but was disbanded in 1919. Under the Empire Air Training Scheme (EATS), a total of 37,000 aircrew were trained in Australia during 1939–45.

However, the flow of RAAF personnel to the European theatre was slowed by three factors: first, establishment of the massively expanded training process meant that first aircrews trained by the RAAF during the war did not graduate until November 1940; second, RAAF doctrine emphasised the army co-operation and maritime patrol roles; third, the Australian authorities placed great emphasis on a provision of EATS, that Dominion personnel should serve with units from their own air forces, wherever possible. RAAF Article XV fighter squadrons were not operational in Europe until mid-1941.

Nevertheless, more than 30 Australians served in RAF Fighter Command during the Battle. The highest scoring Australian ace of the Battle was Flight Lieutenant Pat Hughes, of No. 234 Squadron RAF, who claimed 14 kills before his death on 7 September 1940.

No. 10 Squadron RAAF, a flying boat squadron was also based in Britain at the time, as part of Coastal Command.

=== Barbados ===
At the start of the war, the small Caribbean island of Barbados was a British crown colony. Aubrey "Sinbad" de Lisle Inniss (1916–2003) was the sole Barbadian to serve as a pilot during the Battle of Britain. Inniss was born in Barbados to a British family and joined the RAF in 1939. During the Battle, he flew a Bristol Blenheim IF night fighter with No. 236 Squadron RAF and was responsible for shooting down a Heinkel He 111 in September 1940. Inniss, who became an ace during his subsequent war service, survived the conflict and retired from the RAF in 1957. The RAF Monument lists Inniss as Bajan, while the RAF Roll of Honour lists him as British.

=== Belgium ===
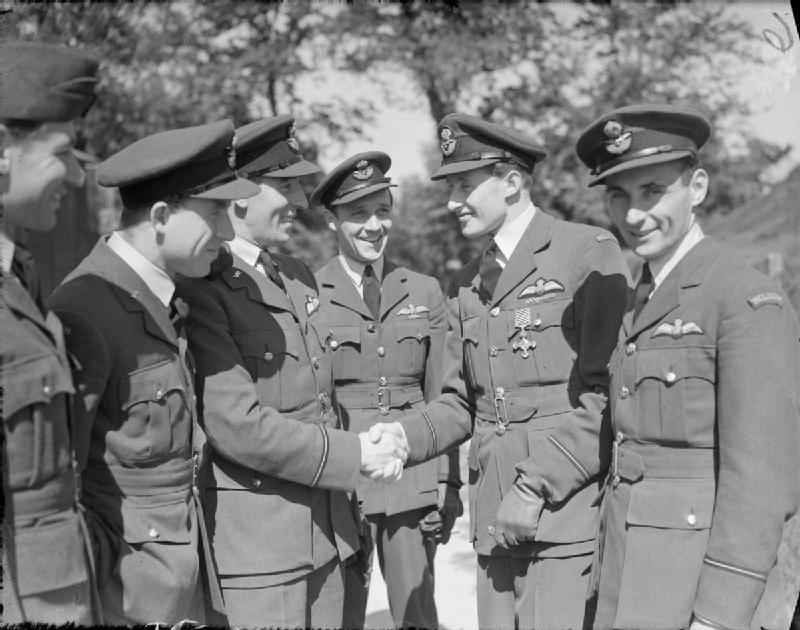
Belgian pilots of No. 609 Squadron RAF

At the time Belgium was invaded in May 1940, it had only a small air force known as the Aéronautique militaire (AéMI). Although it played only a small role during the campaign in Belgium, a number of Belgian pilots succeeded in reaching Britain in the aftermath of the surrender. A significant number of Belgians were also undergoing flight training in France and, despite the reluctance of the Belgian government in Bordeaux, 124 reached Britain by August 1940, although few were able to participate in the Battle of Britain.

As of December 2014, the RAF officially recognises 30 Belgians as having participated in the Battle of Britain (of whom 18 did not survive the war) although the Battle of Britain monument (constructed in 2005) includes 28. At the time of the battle, Belgian pilots were mixed into British units and did not have their own squadrons. By the summer of 1940, Belgians made up around half of No. 609 Squadron RAF, a unit flying Spitfire fighters. Nos. 235 and 236 Squadrons of RAF Coastal Command also had disproportionate numbers of Belgian pilots, at 8 and 6 respectively. Altogether, Belgium provided the largest contingent of pilots during the Battle of Britain that were not from Eastern Europe or the Commonwealth.

During the course of the battle, Belgian pilots were responsible for shooting down 21 German aircraft. Between seven and 10 Belgians were killed. Pilot Officer Jacques Philippart, who had destroyed at least six German aircraft during the Battle of Britain by the time of his death on 25 August 1940, was the first Belgian flying ace of the Second World War. In 1942, two all-Belgian squadrons were formed and, in total, 1,200 Belgians served in the RAF during the course of the war.

=== Canada ===
Many Canadians served in the fighter squadrons which repulsed the Luftwaffe in the summer of 1940. In fact, although the RAF only recognises 83 Canadian pilots as flying on fighter operations during the Battle of Britain, the RCAF claims the actual figure was over 100, and that of those 23 who died and 30 more were killed later in the war. Much of this confusion can be attributed to the fact that apart from RCAF members flying in RCAF units, there were those RCAF members who were in RAF units as well as Canadians who were members of the RAF, not the RCAF. Another 200 Canadian pilots fought with RAF Bomber Command and RAF Coastal Command during the period and approx 2,000 Canadians served as ground crew.

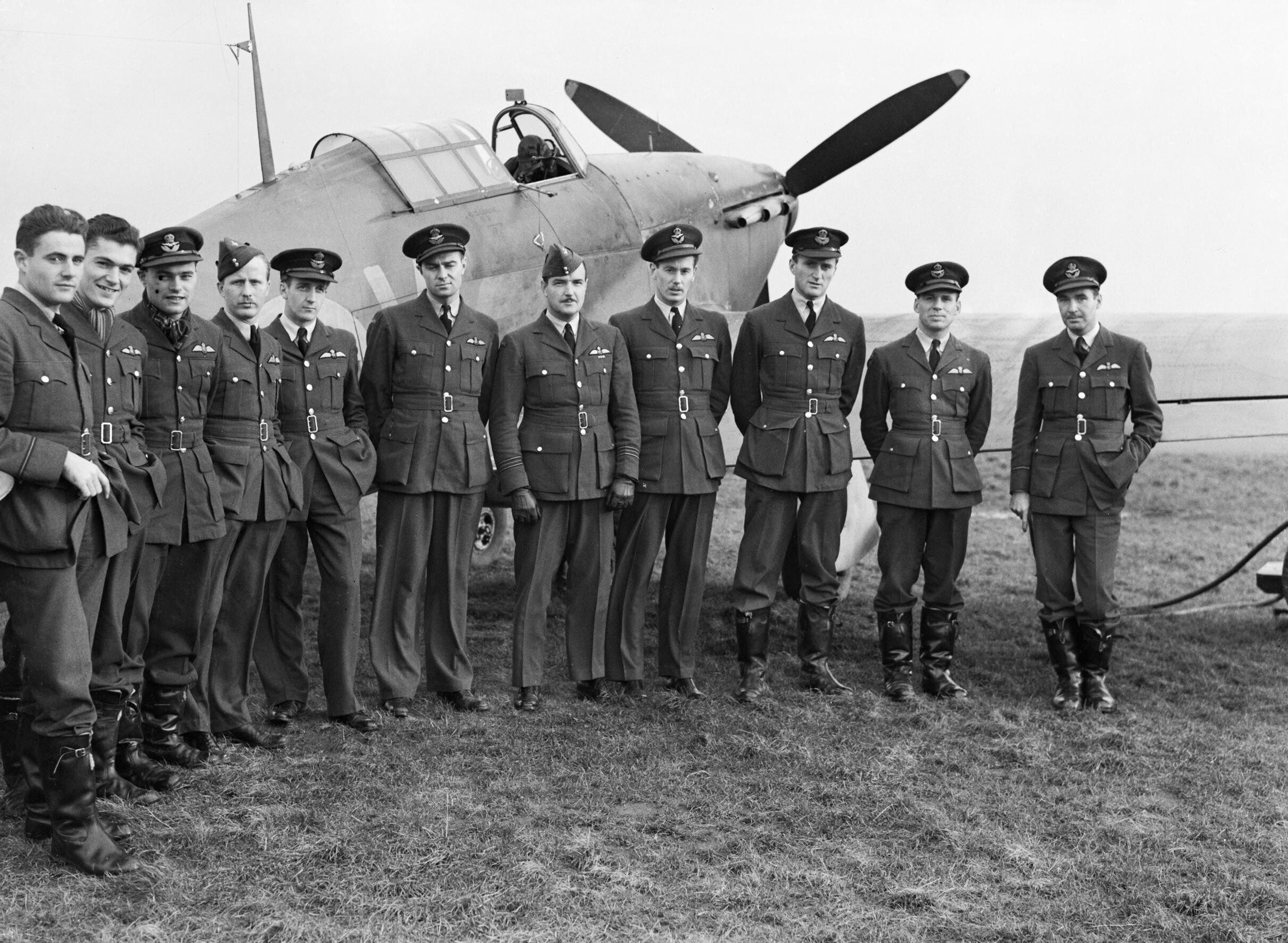
Canadian pilots from No. 1 Squadron RCAF, photographed in October 1940

Of these, 26 were in No. 1 Squadron RCAF, flying Hurricanes. The squadron arrived in Britain soon after Dunkirk with 27 officers and 314 ground staff. This squadron would later be re-numbered as No. 401 "City of Westmount" Squadron RCAF, in line with Article XV of the British Commonwealth Air Training Plan (see above). It was the only fighter unit from the Commonwealth air forces to see combat in the Battle of Britain.

No. 1 Squadron made an inauspicious start to its service with Fighter Command, when on 24 August 1940 two of its Hurricanes mistook a flight of Bristol Blenheims for Junkers Ju 88s, shooting one down with the loss of its crew; an example of what is now known as friendly fire. No. 1 became the first RCAF unit to engage enemy aircraft in battle when it met a formation of German bombers over southern England on 26 August 1940, claiming three kills and four damaged, with the loss of one pilot and one aircraft. By mid-October the squadron had claimed 31 enemy aircraft destroyed and 43 probables or damaged for the loss of 16 aircraft and three pilots.

Other Canadians were spread across RAF squadrons, and on the second day of the Battle, 11 July, Canada suffered its first fighter casualty. In a Luftwaffe attack on the Royal Navy Dockyard naval base at Portland Harbour, Plt Offr D. A. Hewitt of Saint John, New Brunswick, flying a Hurricane with No. 501 Squadron RAF, attacked a Dornier Do 17 bomber and was hit himself. His aircraft plunged into the sea.

The dispersed Canadian airmen included one who flew with No. 303 (Polish) Squadron. A total of 12 Canadian pilots in the Royal Air Force including Willie McKnight flew with No. 242 Squadron RAF at various times through the Battle. On 30 August, under the command of Squadron Leader Douglas Bader, nine 242 Squadron aircraft met 100 enemy aircraft over Essex. Attacking from above, the squadron claimed 12 victories for no loss.

Canadians also shared in repulsing the Luftwaffe's last major daylight attack. On 27 September 303 Squadron and 1 Squadron RCAF, attacked the first wave of enemy bombers. Seven aircraft were claimed destroyed, one probably destroyed and seven were damaged.

The top Canadian scorer during the Battle was Flt Lt Hamilton Upton of No. 43 Squadron RAF, who claimed 10.25 aircraft shot down.

=== Czechoslovakia ===
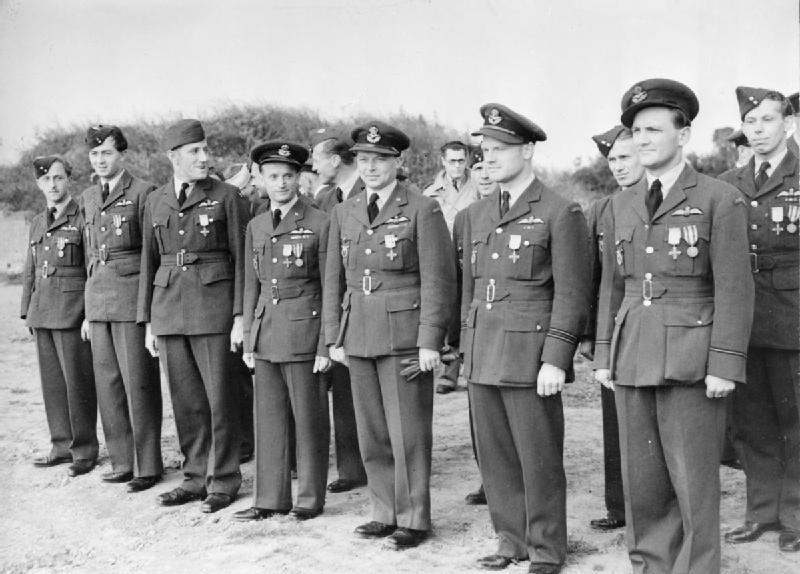
Pilots of No. 312 (Czechoslovak) Squadron RAF

Many of the Czechoslovak pilots had fled to France after Hitler's occupation of their country in March 1939 and had fought in the Armée de L'Air in the short Battle of France, gaining important combat experience. The rapid fall of France caused Czechoslovak soldiers and airmen to leave for Britain, where they established their own squadrons. (Note: Czechoslovak pilots in France shot down 78 enemy planes and with another 14 probables (12 percent of all the French victories during Battle of France). They paid for this success with the loss of 27 pilots killed, out of 135 who flew in France.) Nearly 90 Czechoslovak pilots flew in the Battle of Britain, with No. 310 and No. 312 (Czechoslovak) Squadrons, RAF, formed in the summer 1940 and operational during the battle. Some Czechs also served in other Fighter Command squadrons. Both Czechoslovak squadrons were equipped with Hurricanes.

Czechoslovak fighters earned a reputation for aggressive aerial combat and for skills and bravery. Together with Czechoslovak pilots serving in other RAF units, a total of 86 (84 Czechs and 2 Slovaks) served, claiming almost 60 air kills. Nine pilots were killed. The top Czechoslovak ace was Sgt. Josef František, flying with No. 303 (Polish) Squadron, who claimed 17 confirmed kills, making him the highest scoring non-British pilot in the Battle of Britain.

Czechoslovak forces were financed by the Czechoslovak government-in-exile through a loan by Great Britain (Czechoslovak–British financial agreement).

=== France ===
French volunteers and Free French forces served in 245 and 615 Squadron. 13 are recognised in the Battle of Britain Roll of Honour. Pilots of the Free French Forces also flew with the RAF 100 (Bomber Support) Group, between 1943 and 1945.

=== Ireland ===
Brendan "Paddy" Finucane, an Irish ace who is believed to have shot down four aircraft during the Battle of Britain and as many as 32 by his death in 1942

The Irish Free State (officially called Ireland or, in Gaelic, Eire from 1937) seceded from the British rule in 1922 after a two-year war of independence. Relations between the two countries were still strained in 1940. Although technically a British dominion, Ireland remained neutral for the duration of the Second World War.

Many individual Irish citizens did enlist in the British military, however, and ten pilots from the country fought in the RAF during the Battle of Britain. One of them, Brendan "Paddy" Finucane, became an ace who would claim a total of 32 enemy aircraft before he was killed in 1942. The eldest of five children, Finucane grew up in County Dublin, where his father had taken part in the Easter Rising of 1916. He and his family moved to England in 1936, and he enlisted in the Royal Air Force aged 17. Finucane became operational in July 1940 and downed his first Bf 109 on 12 August, claiming a second the following day. During a 51-day period in 1941, Finucane claimed 16 Messerschmitt Bf 109 fighters shot down, while he was flying with an Australian squadron. Finucane became the youngest Wing Commander in the RAF, a rank he received at 21. He was shot down on 15 July 1942.

The world's last verified surviving Battle of Britain pilot was Group Captain John Hemingway, who was born in Dublin and returned to settle in Ireland in 2011. A Flying Officer during the Battle, he damaged a Bf 109 and was himself twice shot down in that period. He died on 17 March 2025.

=== Jamaica ===
In 1940, the island of Jamaica was a crown colony under British rule. The sole Jamaican recognized as a participant in the Battle of Britain was Herbert Capstick, a Pilot Officer of British origin, who had been born in Jamaica in 1920. Capstick served in No. 236 Squadron RAF of Coastal Command. The Squadron was equipped with Bristol Blenheims and participated in anti-submarine operations in the English Channel. He survived the war and returned to live in Jamaica.

=== Newfoundland ===
Newfoundland was a separate dominion within the British Empire at the time of the battle. Pilot Officer Richard Alexander Howley is recognized as the sole Newfoundlander to serve in the RAF during the period by the Battle of Britain monument. Howley served in No. 141 Squadron RAF, flying Boulton Paul Defiant turret fighters. He was shot down over Dover on 19 July 1940, and posted missing in action.

=== New Zealand ===
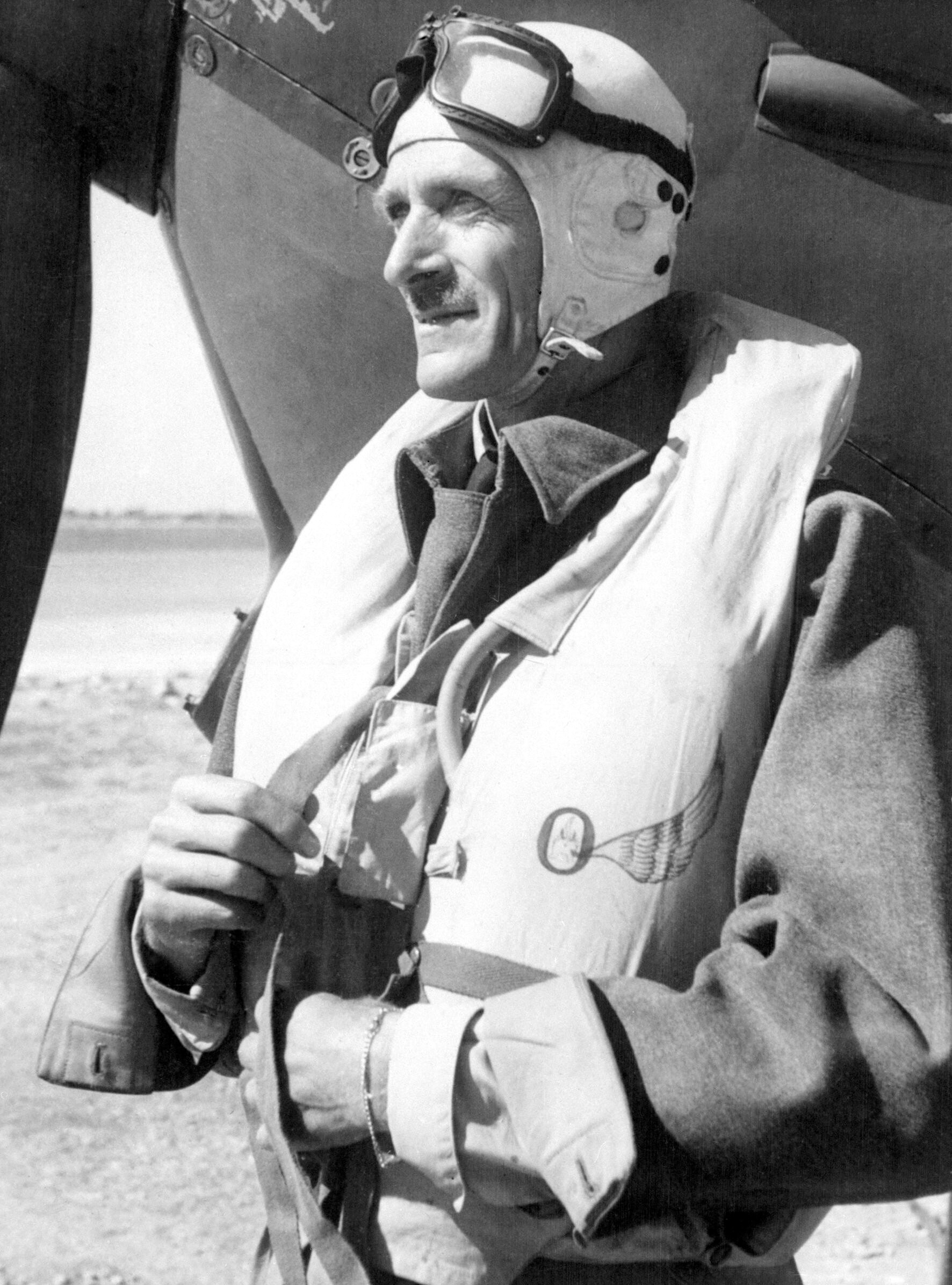
Sir Keith Park

New Zealand was among the first countries to declare war on Germany. The Royal New Zealand Air Force (RNZAF) was set up as a separate service in 1937, but numbered less than 1,200 personnel by September 1939. The Empire Air Training Scheme had resulted in about 100 RNZAF pilots being sent to Europe by the time the battle started. Unlike the other dominions, New Zealand did not insist on its aircrews serving with RNZAF squadrons, thereby speeding up the rate at which they entered service. An annual rate of 1,500 fully trained pilots was reached by January 1941.

The most prominent New Zealander in the battle was Air Vice Marshal Keith Park, a high scoring air ace in the First World War and a member of the RAF since its creation. At the time he was air officer commanding No. 11 Group, defending London and south-east England.

The RAF recognises 135 Fighter Command aircrew from New Zealand as having served in the battle. Several New Zealanders became high scorers, including Pilot Officer Colin Falkland Gray (No. 54 Squadron) with 14 claims, Flying Officer Brian Carbury (No. 603 Squadron) with 14 claims, and Pilot Officer Alan Christopher Deere (No. 54 Squadron), with 12 claims. Carbury shot down the first German aircraft over British territory since 1918, and was also one of two ace-in-a-day pilots of the battle.

=== Northern Rhodesia ===
In 1940, Northern Rhodesia (today Zambia) was a British protectorate in Southern Africa. One Northern Rhodesian, of British origin, is recognised as a participant in the Battle of Britain. Pilot Officer John Ellacombe was born in Livingstone in 1920 and was educated in South Africa. He joined the RAF in 1939 and served in No. 151 Squadron during the Battle of Britain, flying Hurricanes. During the Battle, Ellacombe shot down several German bomber aircraft and was himself shot down on two occasions. He enjoyed a successful career in the RAF after 1940, retiring as an Air Commodore in 1973. He died in 2014.

=== Poland ===
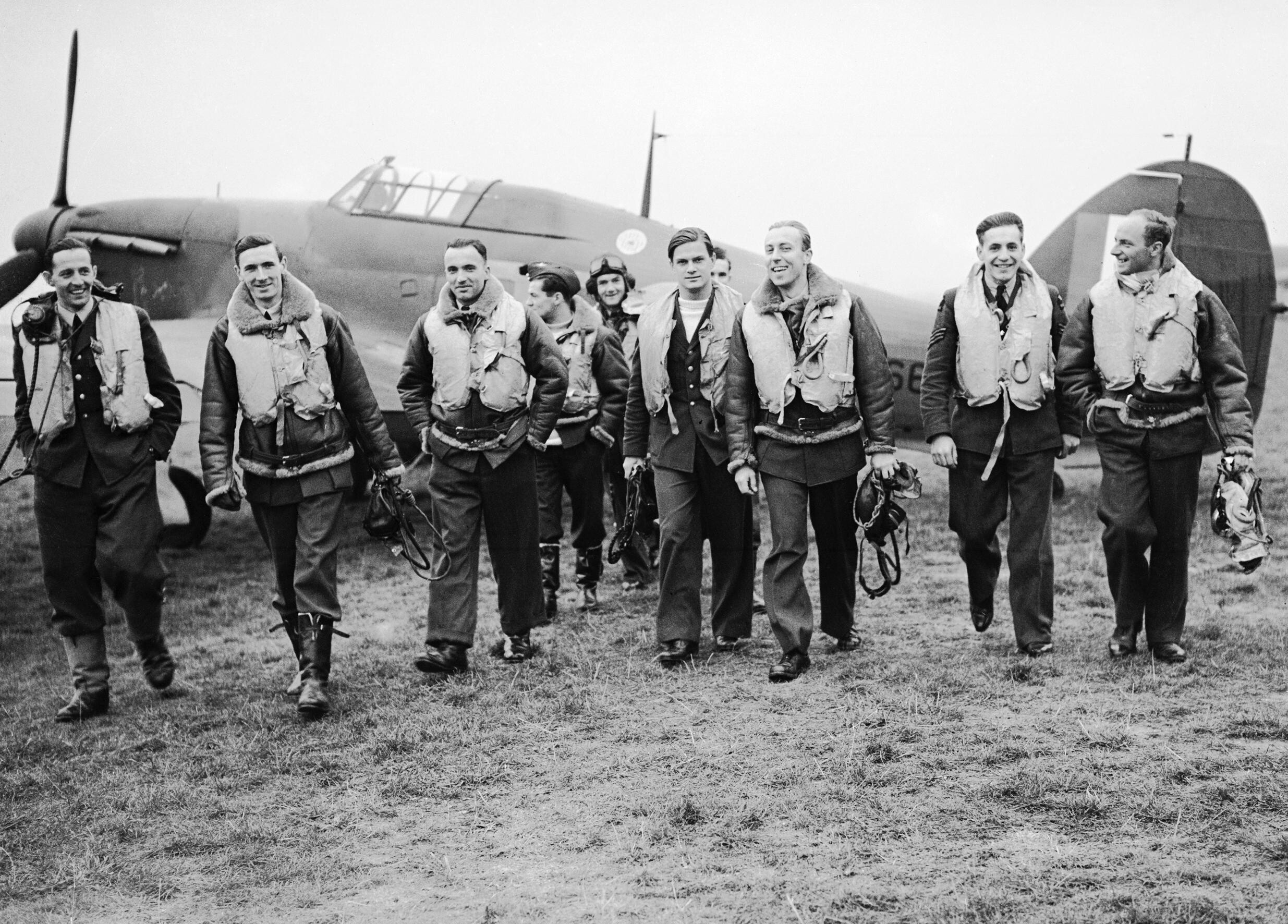
Polish pilots of No. 303 Squadron

Following the German invasion of Poland, many Polish pilots were evacuated and made their way to France and Britain. During the German invasion of France in May 1940, of the 1,600 Polish pilots available to the Armée de l'Air it is estimated that only about 150 took an active part in combat. By June 1940, the Poles had over 85,000 men in France, including pilots and ground troops. Many of these personnel escaped to the UK around the time of the fall of France.

By mid 1940, some 35,000 Polish airmen, soldiers and sailors had made their way to Britain, making up the largest foreign military force in the country after the French, as well as making it the largest Polish army ever formed abroad; of these some 8,500 were airmen. Many were members of the Polish Air Force which had fought the Luftwaffe. However, the Air Ministry and the RAF underestimated their potential value in fighting against the Luftwaffe, as they felt that the Polish defeat on home soil was due to incompetence and lack of training. Most of the Poles were initially posted either to bomber squadrons or the RAF Volunteer Reserve.

Another one of the biggest barriers the Poles had to face was that of language. The fact that the majority of the Poles could not speak English made them unreliable in battle in the eyes of British commanders. One of the commanders stated that he would not have "people crashing around the sky until they understand what they're told to do." The Poles had to go through English language training before the majority of them could see action. On 11 June 1940, the Polish government-in-exile signed an agreement with the British Government to form a Polish Air Force in Great Britain. Finally, in July 1940, the RAF announced that it would form two Polish fighter squadrons: No. 302 Squadron and No. 303 Squadron were composed of Polish pilots and ground crews, although their flight commanders and commanding officers were British. The two fighter squadrons went into action in August, with 89 Polish pilots. Another 50 Poles took part in the battle, in RAF squadrons.

Polish pilots were among the most experienced in the battle; most had hundreds of hours of pre-war flying experience and had fought in the Invasion of Poland or the battle of France. The Polish pilots had been well trained in formation flying and had learned from combat experience to fire from close range. By comparison, one Polish pilot referred to the close formation flying and set-piece attacks practiced in the RAF as "simply suicidal". The 147 Polish pilots claimed 201 aircraft shot down. No. 303 Squadron claimed the highest number of kills, 126, of any Hurricane squadron engaged in the battle of Britain.

Witold Urbanowicz of No. 303 Squadron was the top Polish scorer with 15 claims. Antoni Głowacki was one of two Allied pilots in the battle to shoot down five German aircraft in one day, on 24 August the other was New Zealander Brian Carbury. Stanisław Skalski became the top-scoring Polish fighter ace of the Second World War. With their combat experience, Polish pilots would have known that the quickest and most efficient way to destroy an enemy aircraft was to fire from close range, which often surprised their British counterparts: "After firing a brief opening burst at 150 to 200 yards, just to get on the enemy's nerves, the Poles would close almost to point-blank range. That was where they did their real work. "When they go tearing into enemy bombers and fighters they get so close you would think they were going to collide." In all, 30 Polish airmen were killed during the battle.

The close range tactics used by the Poles led to suggestions of recklessness, but there is little evidence for this view. For example, the death rate in No. 303 Squadron was lower than the average rate for other RAF squadrons, despite the squadron having been the highest-scoring Hurricane squadron during the battle. The Polish War Memorial on the outskirts of RAF Northolt was dedicated in 1948, as a commemoration of the Polish contribution to Allied arms.

=== South Africa ===
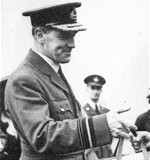
Air Vice Marshal Quintin Brand, a South African and Commander in the Battle of Britain

One of the RAF's leading aces, and one of the highest scoring pilots during the Battle of Britain was Adolph "Sailor" Malan DFC, an RAF pilot since 1936, who led No. 74 Squadron at the height of the Battle of Britain. Under his leadership No. 74 became one of the RAF's best units. Malan claimed his first two victories over Dunkirk on 21 May 1940, and had claimed five more by the time the Battle started in earnest. Between 19 July and 22 October he shot down six German aircraft. His "Ten Rules for Air Fighting" were printed and pinned up in crew rooms all over Fighter Command. He was part of a group of about 25 pilots from South Africa that took part in the Battle, eight or nine of whom (depending on sources) died during the Battle.

Other notable pilots included P/O Albert "Zulu" Lewis, who opened his account over France in May with No. 85 Squadron, shooting down three Messerschmitt Bf 109s in one action. With No. 85 in August, and then in September with No. 249 Squadron under Squadron Leader (later Air Chief Marshal) Sir John Grandy, at North Weald. Lewis flew three, four and five times a day and on 15 September 1940 got a He 111, and shared in the probable destruction of another. On 18 September he got his 12th confirmed enemy aircraft. By 27 September, flying GN-R, Lewis had 18 victories. He was shot down and badly burned on 28 September. Lewis missed the rest of the Battle and his recovery to flying fitness took over three months. Basil Gerald "Stapme" Stapleton, with several probables to his credit, survived a crash on 7 September, trying to stop bombers getting through to London. Both men would later command RAF squadrons.

The most senior officer of South African origin during the Battle was Air Vice-Marshal Sir Christopher J. Quintin-Brand KBE, DSO, MC, DFC, Air Officer Commanding No. 10 Group RAF covering the South-West; a long service RAF officer, he had joined the RFC in 1916.

=== Southern Rhodesia ===
Southern Rhodesia (today Zimbabwe) was a British self-governing colony in Southern Africa at the time of the Battle of Britain. Three pilots born in Southern Rhodesia took part in the Battle of Britain: Squadron Leader Caesar Hull, Pilot Officer John Chomley, and Flight Lieutenant John Holderness. Of these, Hull and Chomley lost their lives. Hull, the highest-scoring RAF ace of the Norwegian Campaign earlier in the year, was killed in a dogfight over south London on 7 September 1940, a week after taking command of No. 43 Squadron RAF. Chomley went missing in action over the Channel on 12 August 1940 and was never found.

=== United States ===
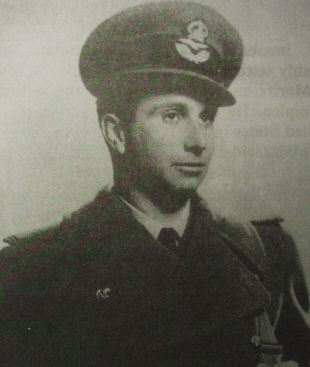
Billy Fiske, the first American pilot to be killed

The RAF recognises seven aircrew personnel who were from the United States as having taken part in the Battle of Britain. American citizens were prohibited from serving under the various U.S. Neutrality Acts; if an American citizen had defied strict neutrality laws, there was a risk of losing their citizenship and imprisonment. It is believed that another four Americans misled the British authorities about their origins, claiming to be Canadian or other nationalities.

Billy Fiske was probably the most famous American pilot in the Battle of Britain, although he pretended to be a Canadian at the time. Fiske saw service with No. 601 Squadron RAF and claimed one—unconfirmed—kill. He crashed on 16 August 1940, and died the following day.

- Alexander Zatonski, No. 79 Squadron RAF - missing in action North Africa 6 December 1941
- Andrew Mamedoff, No. 609 Squadron RAF - killed in crash 8 October 1941
- Art Donahue, No. 64 Squadron RAF - KIA 11 September 1942
- Carl Raymond Davis, (Note: British citizen from 1932, joined Royal Auxiliary Air Force in 1936) No. 601 Squadron RAF - KIA 6 September 1940
- De Peyster Brown, No. 401 Squadron RCAF
- Eugene Tobin, No. 609 Squadron RAF - KIA over France 7 September 1941
- John Kenneth Haviland, No. 152 Squadron RAF
- Phillip Leckrone, No. 616 Squadron RAF - killed in flying accident 5 January 1941
- Vernon Keough, No. 609 Squadron RAF - crashed during combat 15 February 1941
- Billy Fiske, No. 601 Squadron RAF - died of wounds 17 August 1940

== In popular culture ==
Arkady Fiedler wrote a book about Polish pilots flying in the RAF during the Second World War, which was published in August 1942. The 2018 Polish-British film Hurricane depicts the experiences of a group of Poles flying as part of the No. 303 Squadron RAF (Dywizjon 303) in the Battle of Britain during the war.

At the end of the 1969 film the Battle of Britain a list is shown containing the nationality of pilots that flew for the RAF. It incorrectly includes within this list a single person from Israel. This relates to George Goodman who was born in Haifa in 1920, which was at the time was part of a joint British, French and Arab military administration known as "Occupied Enemy Territory Administration" — it later became British military-administered Mandatory Palestine. Goodman was a British citizen and Israel did not become an independent country until 1948. In some lists he recorded as Palestinian - also incorrectly. He was killed in action in Libya in 1941.

During campaigning for the 2009 elections for the European Parliament, the far-right British National Party (BNP) used an image of a Spitfire, with the caption "Battle for Britain", in a publicity attempt to win support for the party's anti-immigration stance. The picture chosen, however, depicted a Spitfire flown by a Polish pilot from No. 303 (Polish) Squadron and the party was mocked in the British media as "absurd".

The song "Aces in Exile" from the 2010 album Coat of Arms by Swedish power metal band Sabaton is about foreign pilots serving in the battle of Britain. The song specifically references the No. 303 (Polish), No. 310 (Czechoslovak), and No. 401 (Canadian) Squadrons.

== See also ==
- List of RAF aircrew in the Battle of Britain
- No. 10 (Inter-Allied) Commando
- Emergency Powers (Defence) Act 1939
- Allied Forces Act 1940
