= Art Donahue =

American World War II flying ace

Arthur Gerald Donahue
- Born: 29 January 1913; St. Charles, Minnesota, United States
- Died: 11 September 1942 (aged 29); Over the English Channel
- Military career
- Allegiance: United Kingdom
- Branch: Royal Air Force
- Service years: 1940–1942
- Rank: Flight Lieutenant
- Nickname: Art
- Service number: 81624
- Units: No. 64 Squadron RAF; No. 71 Squadron RAF; No. 91 Squadron RAF; No. 258 Squadron RAF
- Conflicts: World War II: Battle of Britain; Battle of Singapore
- Awards: Distinguished Flying Cross
- Other work: Author

Arthur Gerald Donahue, DFC (29 January 1913 – 11 September 1942) was an American fighter pilot who volunteered to fly for the British Royal Air Force in World War II. He was one of 11 American pilots who flew with RAF Fighter Command between 10 July and 31 October 1940, thereby qualifying for the Battle of Britain clasp to the 1939–45 campaign star. He was killed in action in September 1942.

== Early life ==
Donahue was born to Frank and Ada Donahue on 29 January 1913 and was raised on a dairy farm near St. Charles, Minnesota. He learned to fly as a teenager at the Conrad Flying Service, operated by Max Conrad, an aviator known as the "Flying Grandfather" who had set numerous world records for distance and endurance. Becoming Minnesota's youngest commercially certificated pilot at the age of 19, Donahue helped Conrad run the flight school until he left to enlist in the Royal Air Force. He traveled to Canada, claimed to be Canadian, and was accepted.

== Royal Air Force service ==
After training with No. 7 Operational Training Unit, Donahue was assigned to No. 64 Squadron at RAF Kenley on 3 August 1940. Two days later, he saw combat against Messerschmitt Bf 109s off the French coast, and suffered serious damage to his aircraft, forcing him to land at RAF Hawkinge. Donahue thus became one of ten Americans to fly for the RAF in the Battle of Britain in 1940.

A week later, on 12 August, Donahue was wounded in combat over England's south coast in his Supermarine Spitfire Mk. I. He was forced to bail out of his burning aircraft, and suffered burns and leg injuries.

On 29 September 1940, Donahue was reassigned to No. 71 Squadron, one of three Eagle Squadrons, RAF units composed of American pilots, but did not see combat with that unit. Because of the lack of action, he requested to be reassigned to No. 64 Squadron, arriving back there on 23 October.

In February 1941, Donahue served with No. 91 Squadron, although in March he went on leave back to the USA. In October 1941 he was posted to No. 258 Squadron in the Far East, and participated in the Battle of Singapore, also seeing action over Sumatra in February 1942, where he was wounded by ground fire. After returning to England in mid-1942, he rejoined No 91 Squadron as a flight commander. He became the first American in RAF history to lead an all-British squadron. He was credited with downing two enemy aircraft, with two more probables and one damaged. He was awarded four medals, including the Distinguished Flying Cross on 27 March 1942. The citation for the award read:

This officer has carried out many low level reconnaissance sorties and.- has successfully attacked enemy shipping and ground objectives. On one occasion, whilst carrying out an attack against enemy troops attempting a landing, Flying Officer Donahue silenced the enemy's fire, thus enabling the rest of the formation to press home their attacks with impunity. He has destroyed several enemy aircraft.

— London Gazette

=== Death ===
Flight Lieutenant Donahue was killed in action on 11 September 1942, while a member of No. 91 Squadron. Attempting to intercept a Ju 88, his plane was hit by return fire and ditched in the English Channel. His body was never found. Donahue once wrote in a letter to his parents, "My life may not be long, but it will be wide." He is commemorated on the Air Forces Memorial at Runnymede in Surrey, England.

=== Author ===
Donahue wrote two books about his RAF service, Tally-Ho! Yankee in a Spitfire and Last Flight from Singapore.

== See also ==
- List of RAF aircrew in the Battle of Britain
- Non-British personnel in the RAF during the Battle of Britain § United States

== Bibliography ==
- Donahue, Arthur Gerald. (1944). Last Flight from Singapore. London: Macmillan & Company.
- Donahue, Arthur Gerald (1942). Tally-Ho! Yankee in a Spitfire. New York: McMillan & Company.
- Kershaw, Alex. (2006). The Few. Cambridge, Mass.: Da Capo Press. ISBN 978-0-306-81303-0
