= List of World War II aces credited with 8 victories =

Fighter aces in World War II had tremendously varying kill scores, affected as they were by many factors: the pilot's skill level, the performance of the airplane the pilot flew and the planes they flew against, how long they served, their opportunity to meet the enemy in the air (Allied to Axis disproportion), whether they were the formation's leader or a wingman, the standards their air service brought to the awarding of victory credits, et cetera.

== Aces ==
This background, along with the symbol "†", indicates that the pilot was killed in action, missing in action, died of wounds, or was killed in a flying accident during World War II.

Name	Country	Service(s)	Aerial victories	Other aerial victories	Notes
Charles E. Watts	United States	U.S. Navy	8.75		
John L. Banks	United States	U.S. Navy	8.5		
William E. Bryan, Jr.	United States	U.S. Army Air Forces	8.5		
Stanisław Brzeski	Poland	Polish Air Force; Royal Air Force	8.5		
James B. Cain	United States	U.S. Navy	8.5		
Charles J. Cesky	United States	U.S. Army Air Forces	8.5		
Oscar I. Chenoweth	United States	U.S. Navy	8.5		
Arthur Chin	United States	Chinese Nationalist Air Force	8.5		First American ace of WWII, flew biplane fighter
Frank A. Cutler	United States	U.S. Army Air Forces	8.5		(+3 ground kills)
Carl C. Foster	United States	U.S. Navy	8.5		
John F. Gray	United States	U.S. Navy	8.5		
Everett G. Hargreaves	United States	U.S. Navy	8.5		
Thomas L. Hayes, Jr.	United States	U.S. Army Air Forces	8.5		
Zdzisław Henneberg †	Poland	Polish Air Force; Royal Air Force	8.5		
John H. Hoefker	United States	U.S. Army Air Forces	8.5		
Otto D. Jenkins	United States	U.S. Army Air Forces	8.5		(+2 ground kills)
Arthur G. Johnson	United States	U.S. Army Air Forces	8.5		
George Noel Keith †	Canada	Royal Canadian Air Force	8.5		
Wacław Król	Poland	Polish Air Force; Royal Air Force	8.5		
Frank L. Lawlor	United States	American Volunteer Group	8.5		
Gregory K. Loesch	United States	U.S. Marine Corps	8.5		
Carl J. Luksic	United States	U.S. Army Air Forces	8.5		(+7 ground kills)
Donald McDowell	United States	U.S. Army Air Forces	8.5		
Bernard J. McGrattan	United States	U.S. Army Air Forces	8.5		
Sanford K. Moats	United States	U.S. Army Air Forces	8.5		
John L. Morgan, Jr.	United States	U.S. Marine Corps	8.5		
George W. Pigman	United States	U.S. Navy	8.5		
Claude W. Plant	United States	U.S. Navy	8.5		
Albert L. Schlegel	United States	U.S. Army Air Forces	8.5		
Dallas Schmidt	Canada	Royal Canadian Air Force	8.5		
Larry R. Self	United States	U.S. Navy	8.5		
Eugeniusz Szaposznikow	Poland	Polish Air Force; Royal Air Force	8 1/3		
John Fraser Drummond	United Kingdom	Royal Air Force	8 1/3		
Franklin T. Gabriel	United States	U.S. Navy	8 1/4		
George Bray McMillan	United States	U.S. Army Air Forces	8 1/4		(+1 ground kills)
Adolf Pietrasiak	Poland	Polish Air Force; Royal Air Force	8.1		
Witold Łokuciewski	Poland	Polish Air Force; Royal Air Force	8		
Helmut Lennartz	Germany	Luftwaffe	8+		Jet ace with 8 victories in Me 262
Erich Büttner	Germany	Luftwaffe	8		Jet ace with all victories in Me 262
John M. Ainlay	United States	U.S. Army Air Forces	8		possibly just 7
John R. Alison	United States	U.S. Army Air Forces	8		
David W. Allen	United States	U.S. Army Air Forces	8		
John Allen †	United Kingdom	Royal Air Force	8		
Wilfred Arthur	Australia	Royal Australian Air Force	8		
Cyril Babbage	United Kingdom	Royal Air Force	8		
Frederick A. Bardshar	United States	U.S. Navy	8		
Lloyd G. Barnard	United States	U.S. Navy	8		
Walter Beaumont †	United Kingdom	Royal Air Force	8		
Walter G. Benz, Jr.	United States	U.S. Army Air Forces	8		
Kenneth Blair	United Kingdom	Royal Air Force	8		
John Bisdee	United Kingdom	Royal Air Force	8		(+2 shared)
Derek Boitel-Gill †	United Kingdom	Royal Air Force	8		
William J. Bonneau	United States	U.S. Navy	8		
Robert J. Booth	United States	U.S. Army Air Forces	8		
Roy O. Burnett, Jr.	United States	U.S. Navy	8		
Andrew Bosman	South Africa	South African Air Force	8		(+ 3 shared)
Walter J. Carroll, Jr.	United States	U.S. Army Air Forces	8		
William N. Case	United States	U.S. Marine Corps	8		
J. D. Collinsworth	United States	U.S. Army Air Forces	8		possibly just 6
Arthur W. Cruikshank	United States	U.S. Army Air Forces	8		
Václav Cukr-Cooper	Czechoslovakia	Royal Air Force	8		
John Curchin †	Australia	Royal Air Force	8		
Robert Dafforn †	United Kingdom	Royal Air Force	8		
Fernley H. Damstrom	United States	U.S. Army Air Forces	8		
John F. Dobbin	United States	U.S. Marine Corps	8		
Landis E. Doner	United States	U.S. Navy	8		
Frederick J. Dorsch	United States	U.S. Army Air Forces	8		
Walter F. Duke	United States	U.S. Army Air Forces	8		
William C. Edens	United States	U.S. Army Air Forces	8		(+3 ground kills)
John L. Elder	United States	U.S. Army Air Forces	8		(+13 ground kills)
Eric A. Evenson	United States	U.S. Navy	8		
Arthur C. Fielder, Jr.	United States	U.S. Army Air Forces	8		
Francis M. Fleming	United States	U.S. Navy	8		
James M. Fowle	United States	U.S. Army Air Forces	8		
William A. Gardner	United States	U.S. Army Air Forces	8		
Frank Gaunt	United States	U.S. Army Air Forces	8		possibly just 7
Francis R. Gerard	United States	U.S. Army Air Forces	8		
Clement D. Gile	United States	U.S. Navy	8		
Denys Gillam	United Kingdom	Royal Air Force	8		
Maxwell H. Glenn	United States	U.S. Army Air Forces	8		possibly just 5 (+3 ground kills)
Mathew M. Gordon	United States	U.S. Army Air Forces	8		
Leroy V. Grosshuesch	United States	U.S. Army Air Forces	8		
Fred E. Gutt	United States	U.S. Marine Corps	8		
Mayo A. Hadden, Jr.	United States	U.S. Navy	8		
Leonard Haines †	United Kingdom	Royal Air Force	8		(+ 4 shared)
John Hall	United Kingdom	Royal Air Force	8		
Peter Hall	New Zealand	Royal New Zealand Air Force	8		
Aladár Heppes	Hungary	Royal Hungarian Air Force	8		
Frederick A. Harris	United States	U.S. Army Air Forces	8		
Kenneth F. Hart	United States	U.S. Army Air Forces	8		
Edwin J. Herman (or Hernan), Jr.	United States	U.S. Marine Corps	8		
George L. Hollowell	United States	U.S. Marine Corps	8		
Angus Horne	United Kingdom	Royal Air Force	8		
Jack M. Ilfrey	United States	U.S. Army Air Forces	8		
Mervyn Ingram †	New Zealand	Royal New Zealand Air Force	8		
Michael J. Jackson	United States	U.S. Army Air Forces	8		(+5.5 ground kills)
Byron M. Johnson	United States	U.S. Navy	8		
John M. Johnson	United States	U.S. Navy	8		
John L. Jones	United States	U.S. Army Air Forces	8		
Claiborne H. Kinnard	United States	U.S. Army Air Forces	8		(+17 ground kills)
Pál Kovács †	Hungary	Royal Hungarian Air Force	8		
Charles M. Kunz	United States	U.S. Marine Corps	8		
Wolfgang Kuthe †	Germany	Luftwaffe	8		Night fighter ace
William N. Leonard	United States	U.S. Navy	8		
Elvin L. Lindsay	United States	U.S. Navy	8		
Thomas E. Maloney	United States	U.S. Army Air Forces	8		possibly just 7
William R. Maxwell	United States	U.S. Navy	8		
Earl May, Jr.	United States	U.S. Navy	8		
Wallace McIntosh	United Kingdom	Royal Air Force	8		Avro Lancaster tail gunner
Francis Mellersh	United Kingdom	Royal Air Force	8		
Johnnie G. Miller	United States	U.S. Navy	8		
Erich Mix	Germany	Luftwaffe	8	+3 in World War I	possibly 13
William W. Momyer	United States	U.S. Army Air Forces	8		
Douglas W. Mulcahey	United States	U.S. Navy	8		
Alva C. Murphy	United States	U.S. Army Air Forces	8		
Joseph L. Narr	United States	U.S. Marine Corps	8		
George P. Novotny	United States	U.S. Army Air Forces	8		
John G. O'Neill	United States	U.S. Army Air Forces	8		
Edward M. Owen	United States	U.S. Navy	8		
Nathan T. Post	United States	U.S. Marine Corps	8		
Luther D. Prater, Jr.	United States	U.S. Navy	8		
Edward F. Roddy	United States	U.S. Army Air Forces	8		
Robert R. Rowland	United States	U.S. Army Air Forces	8		
Philip Sangermano (FO)	United States	U.S. Army Air Forces	8		
Charles W. Sawyer	United States	American Volunteer Group; U.S. Army Air Forces	8		victories with 2 air forces
Glenn D. Schiltz Jr.	United States	U.S. Army Air Forces	8		
David A. Scott	United States	U.S. Navy	8		possibly 9
Dale E. Shafer	United States	U.S. Army Air Forces	8		
Robert M. Shaw	United States	U.S. Army Air Forces	8		
William A. Shomo	United States	U.S. Army Air Forces	8		Ace in a day, awarded the Medal of Honor for this action
Irving Smith	New Zealand	Royal New Zealand Air Force	8		Transferred to the Royal Air Force after WWII
James Smith †	Canada	Royal Air Force	8		
Robert H. Smith	United States	U.S. Army Air Forces	8		
Gordon Arthur Stanley	United States	U.S. Navy	8		
Arland Stanton	United States	U.S. Army Air Forces	8		
John L. Sublett	United States	U.S. Army Air Forces	8		
Leopold Šrom	Czechoslovakia	Royal Air Force	8		
James B. Tapp	United States	U.S. Army Air Forces	8		
Philip Edward Tovrea Jr.	United States	U.S. Army Air Forces	8		
James O. Tyler	United States	U.S. Army Air Forces	8		
John Urwin-Mann	Canada	Royal Air Force	8	(+2 shared victories)	
Victor Verity	New Zealand	Royal Air Force	8		
John W. Vogt, Jr.	United States	U.S. Army Air Forces	8		
Boyd D. "Buzz" Wagner	United States	U.S. Army Air Forces	8		First U.S. Armed Forces ace, within nine days of Attack on Pearl Harbor
Victor E. Warford	United States	U.S. Army Air Forces	8		
Arthur T. Warner	United States	U.S. Marine Corps	8		
Charles E. Weaver	United States	U.S. Army Air Forces	8		(+3 ground kills)
Hans-Dieter Weihs	Germany	Luftwaffe	8		Jet ace with all victories in Me 262
Norman. F Williams	Australia	Royal Australian Air Force	8		Bomber rear gunner
Rex Kerslake Wilson	Australia	Royal Australian Air Force	8		
Theodore H. Winters, Jr.	United States	U.S. Navy	8		
Donald K. Yost	United States	U.S. Marine Corps	8		
Dan Scurtu	Kingdom of Romania	Royal Romanian Air Force	8		
Traian Dirjan	Kingdom of Romania	Royal Romanian Air Force	8		
Eugen Cameceanu	Kingdom of Romania	Royal Romanian Air Force	8		
Mihai Mihordea	Kingdom of Romania	Royal Romanian Air Force	8		
Ioan Panaite	Kingdom of Romania	Royal Romanian Air Force	8		
