= No. 152 Squadron RAF =

Defunct flying squadron of the Royal Air Force

No. 152 (Hyderabad) Squadron RAF
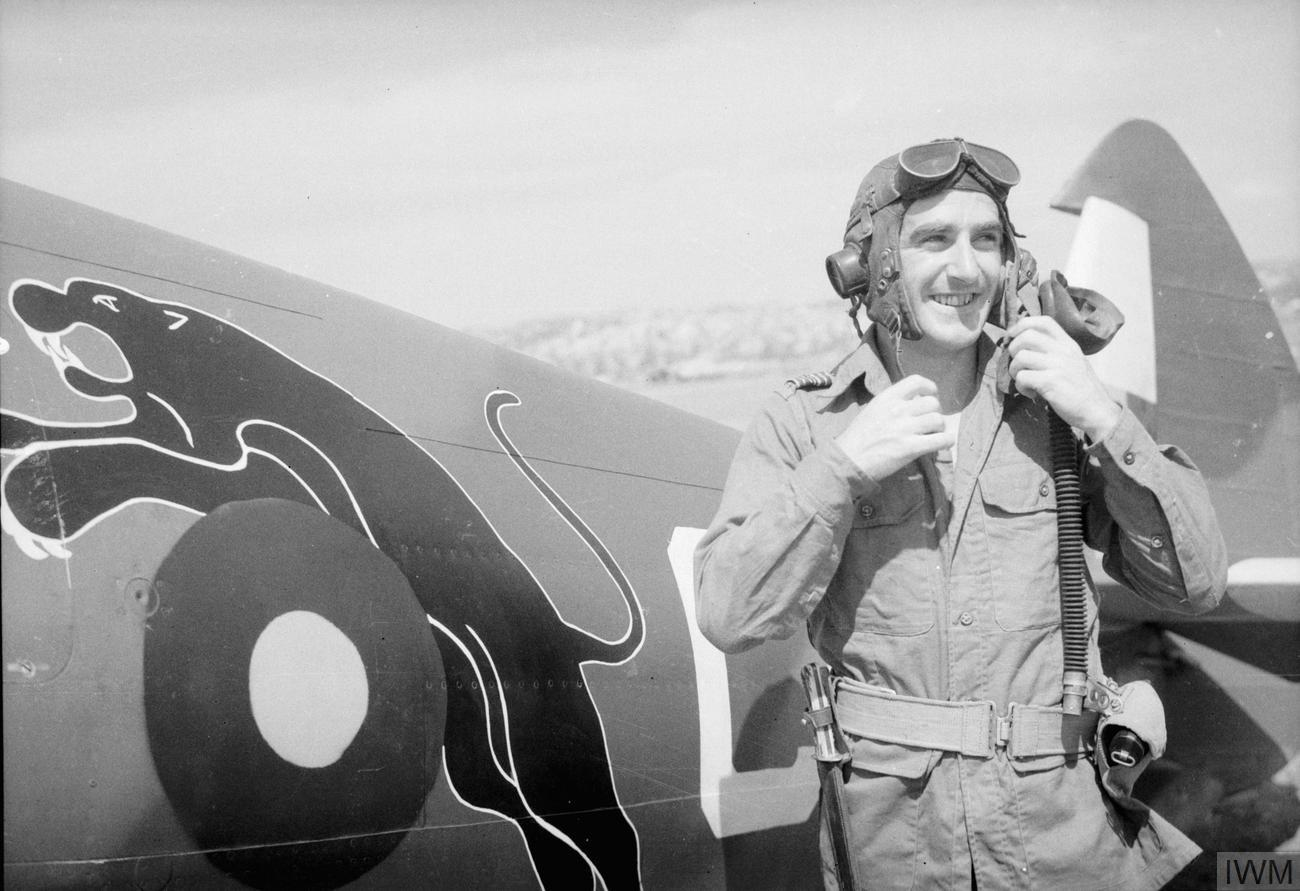
- 152 Squadron pilot and Spitfire in Burma during WWII, showing the distinctive leaping black panther emblem
- Active: 1918–1919; 1939–1947; 1954–1958; 1958–1967
- Country: United Kingdom
- Branch: Royal Air Force
- Role: Fighter squadron
- Nickname: Hyderabad; Black Panthers
- Motto: "Faithful Ally"
- Battle honours: Western Front 1918; Battle of Britain 1940; Home Defence 1940–1942; Channel and North Sea 1941; Atlantic 1941; Biscay Ports 1941; Fortress Europe 1941; North Africa 1942–1943; Sicily 1943; Salerno 1943; Italy 1943; Arakan 1944; Manipur 1944; Burma 1944–1945

Insignia
- Badge: A head-dress. (No 152 Squadron became the gift squadron of Hyderabad and took as its badge the head-dress of the Nizam of Hyderabad.)
- 1950s squadrons roundel

No. 152 (Hyderabad) Squadron RAF was an aircraft squadron of the Royal Air Force during both World War I and World War II.

== Squadron history ==
=== World War I ===
No 152 Squadron was first formed on 1 October 1918 at RAF Rochford as a Sopwith Camel night fighter unit. On 30 June 1919, the squadron was disbanded.

=== World War II ===
The squadron was reformed at RAF Acklington and became operational on 6 November 1939 flying the Gloster Gladiator. The squadron converted to Spitfires and while based at RAF Warmwell in 1940 they participated in the Battle of Britain defending the southern England sector which included Portland Naval Base. In April 1941, the squadron, now commanded by Derek Boitel-Gill, shifted to Portreath. From here it was engaged in flying protective patrols over shipping convoys and in June, began night-fighting duties.

From mid-November 1942 the squadron took part in the invasion of North Africa in Operation Torch. They continued to operate around the Mediterranean, including from bases in Malta and Sicily, during the invasions of Sicily in Operation Husky and mainland Italy in Operation Avalanche.

On 19 December 1943, under the command of Squadron Leader Mervyn Ingram, 152 Squadron moved to Burma and joined the RAF Third Tactical Air Force (TAF). During the Battle of Imphal, the squadron operated from front-line strips and supported the Fourteenth Army during its final conquest of Burma. It was disbanded on 10 March 1946 in Singapore where it had moved after the Japanese surrender.

=== Post-war ===
On 8 May 1946, No. 136 Squadron was renumbered No. 152 while in transit to Bombay, and began flying Spitfires in June pending the arrival of its Tempests. By early August it had received these, but spares problems led to its being disbanded on 15 January 1947.

The squadron was reformed at RAF Wattisham on 1 June 1954 as a night fighter unit flying the Meteor NF12 and NF14, until again disbanded at RAF Stradishall on 11 July 1958.

On 1 October 1958, No.152 Squadron was reformed, this time as a transport squadron in the Persian Gulf. It was disbanded on 15 November 1967.

== Aircraft operated ==
- Sopwith Camel F.1
- Gloster Gladiator I & II
- Spitfire Mk.I
- Spitfire Mk.IIA
- Spitfire Mk.VB
- Spitfire Mk.VC
- Spitfire Mk.IX
- Spitfire Mk.VIII
- Spitfire Mk.XIV
- Hawker Tempest F.2 (1946-47)
- Gloster Meteor NF.12 (1954-58)
- Armstrong Whitworth Meteor NF.14 (1954-58)
- Percival Pembroke C.1 (1958-67)
- Scottish Aviation Twin Pioneer CC.1 (1958-67)
- Scottish Aviation Twin Pioneer CC.2 (1963-67)

== See also ==
- List of Royal Air Force aircraft squadrons
