= Charles Peter O'Sullivan =

American fighter pilot and squadron commander

- Born: July 31, 1915; Eureka, Illinois
- Died: September 20, 2013 (aged 98)
- Military career
- Allegiance: United States Air Force
- Service years: 1941–1968
- Rank: Colonel
- Commands: 39th Fighter Squadron; 308th Strategic Missile Wing
- Conflicts: World War II; Cold War
- Awards: Silver Star; Legion of Merit; Distinguished Flying Cross

Charles Peter O'Sullivan (July 31, 1915 – September 20, 2013) was an American World War II veteran fighter pilot and squadron commander of the 39th Fighter Squadron, Army Air Forces while in New Guinea. He flew the Lockheed P-38 Lightning and was shot down on September 20, 1943, south of Wewak while escorting bombers. He evaded enemy capture in the jungles with just a pistol and a knife and finally rejoined his squadron on October 20, 1943, after 30 days missing in action.

== Early life and education ==
O'Sullivan was born July 31, 1915, in Eureka, Illinois. He attended Eureka College and graduated from Northwestern University with a degree in business administration in 1950.

== Military career ==
He joined the United States Army on February 12, 1941, as an aviation cadet. He was commissioned as a 2nd Lieutenant in the Army Air Forces on September 21, 1941, at Brooks Field and was subsequently transferred to Mitchel Air Force Base, New York. During World War II, he flew 178 combat missions with 400 combat hours, shot down five enemy aircraft and became a flying ace. He was stationed at Port Moresby.

He became the first commander of the 308th Strategic Missile Wing of the Strategic Air Command at Little Rock Air Force Base, Arkansas, which had oversight of 18 LGM-25C Titan II intercontinental ballistic missile launch sites. His unit was on heightened alert during the Cuban Missile Crisis.

He received the Silver Star, Legion of Merit and Distinguished Flying Cross. In 1968, he retired as a colonel. In 1998, he was inducted into the Arkansas Aviation Hall of Fame.

== See also ==
- List of solved missing person cases
