= Yankton High School =

Location
- 1801 Summit St; Yankton, South Dakota 57078; United States
- Coordinates: 42°53′09″N 97°24′36″W

Information
- Type: Public secondary school
- School district: Yankton School District
- Principal: Todd Dvoracek
- Teaching staff: 51.29 (on an FTE basis)
- Grades: 9-12
- Enrollment: 923 (2024-2025)
- Student to teacher ratio: 18.00
- Colors: Red and black
- Athletics conference: Eastern South Dakota Conference
- Nickname: Bucks (boys); Gazelles (girls)
- Website: yhs.ysd.k12.sd.us

Yankton High School is a public high school in Yankton, South Dakota, United States. It serves students in grades 9-12 for Yankton School District 63-3.

== Notable alumni ==
- Frank Biegelmeier, chief justice of the South Dakota Supreme Court
- Tom Brokaw, news anchor
- Leroy V. Grosshuesch, World War II flying ace
- Ray Hamann, professional basketball player
- Colton Iverson, professional basketball player
- Lillian Case Russell, silent movie screenwriter
- Layne Somsen, Major League Baseball pitcher.
- Robert H. Warren, World War II bomber pilot and fourth Superintendent of the U.S. Air Force Academy
