= Ray Hamann =

American basketball player and coach

Personal information
- Born: August 19, 1911 Yankton, South Dakota, U.S.
- Died: May 7, 2005 (aged 93) Yankton, South Dakota, U.S.
- Listed height: 6 ft 4 in (1.93 m)
- Listed weight: 205 lb (93 kg)

Career information
- High school: Yankton (Yankton, South Dakota)
- College: Wisconsin (1932–1935)
- Position: Guard / forward

Career history

Playing
- 1935–1940: Oshkosh All-Stars
- 1937–1938: Kimberly Athletic Association
- 1940–1941: Thorpe Gamble All-Stars
- 1941: Kimberly Pipe Makers

Coaching
- 1937–1938: Kimberly HS
- 19??–19??: Appleton HS
- 1942–1945: Lawrence

Career highlights
- As head coach: Midwest Conference champion (1943)

Raymond Henry Hamann (August 19, 1911 – May 7, 2005) was an American professional basketball player and college coach. By playing in the National Basketball League for the Oshkosh All-Stars during the 1937–38 and 1938–39 seasons, Hamann became the first South Dakotan to play organized professional basketball. He also competed for the All-Stars when they were a barnstorming independent team.

Hamann played college basketball at Wisconsin from 1932–33 to 1934–35 and helped guide the Badgers to a co-conference championship as a senior. During his professional career he coached basketball at Kimberly and Appleton high schools. He served in the Navy during World War II. When he returned, Hamann earned a master's degree from Lawrence University in Appleton, Wisconsin, while also serving as their head men's basketball coach from 1942–43 to 1944–45. Although he compiled a cumulative record of 11 wins and 15 losses, he led the Vikings to a Midwest Conference championship in his first season.

Hamann died on May 7, 2005, in his hometown of Yankton, South Dakota.
