= 39th Flying Training Squadron =

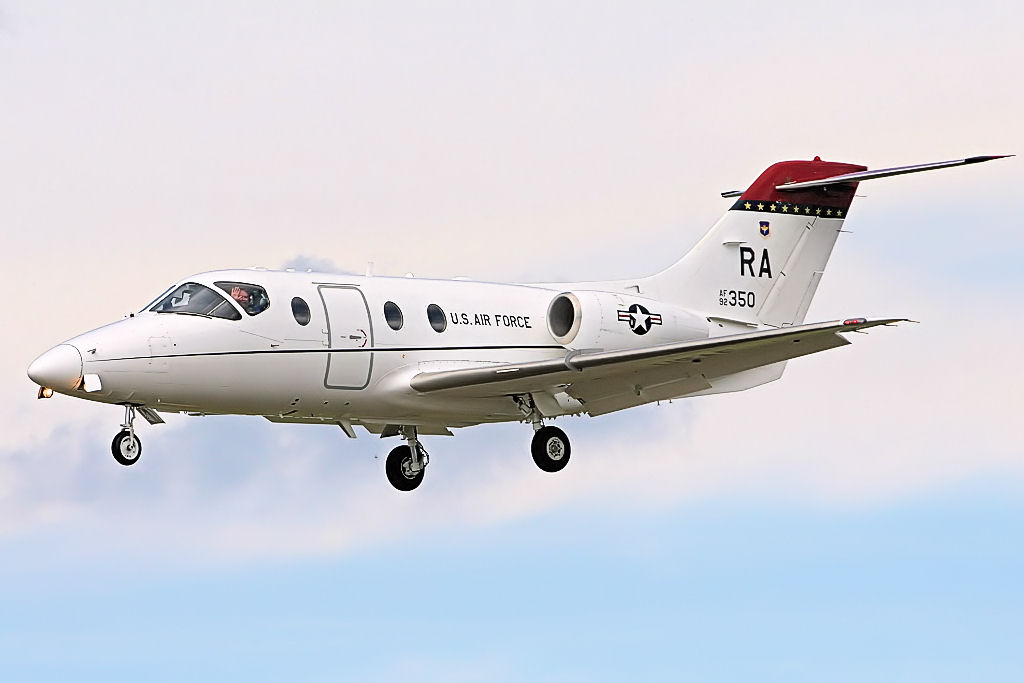
- T-1 Jayhawk from Randolph AFB
- Active: 1940–1957; 1969–1974; 1977–1984; 1990–1991; 1993–1999; 2001–2007; 2007–present
- Country: United States
- Branch: United States Air Force
- Role: Instructor Pilot Training
- Part of: Air Force Reserve Command
- Garrison/HQ: Randolph Air Force Base
- Engagements: Southwest Pacific Theater; Korean War
- Decorations: Distinguished Unit Citation; Air Force Outstanding Unit Award; Philippine Presidential Unit Citation; Republic of Korea Presidential Unit Citation

Commanders
- Notable commanders: Lt. Col. Thomas J. Lynch; Brig Gen. Robert F. Titus

Insignia
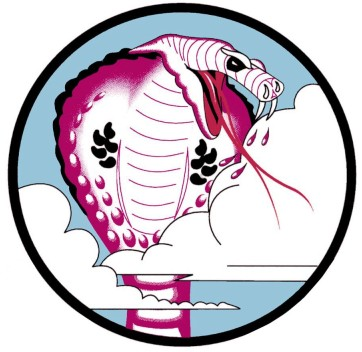
- 39th Flying Training Squadron emblem (approved 13 April 2009)

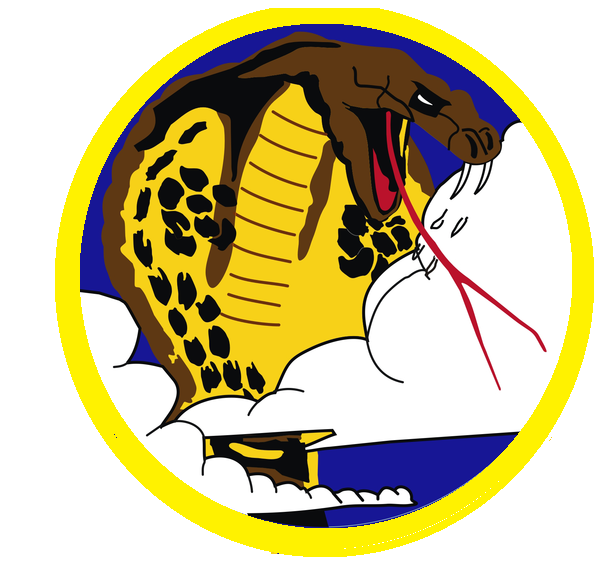
- 39th Pursuit Squadron emblem (approved 16 April 1941)

The 39th Flying Training Squadron is part of the 340th Flying Training Group and is the reserve associate to the 12th Flying Training Wing based at Randolph Air Force Base, Texas.

The squadron was first activated as the 39th Pursuit Squadron in the buildup of the United States Army Air Corps in response to the War in Europe. It moved to the Pacific Coast in response to the attack on Pearl Harbor and briefly flew antisubmarine patrols before deploying to the Southwest Pacific Theater, earning two Distinguished Unit Citations (DUC)s and a Philippine Presidential Unit Citation for its actions during the war.

The squadron remained in the Far East and as the 39th Fighter-Interceptor Squadron was part of the air defenses of Japan when North Korea invaded South Korea. The 39th earned two more DUCs and a Republic of Korea Presidential Unit Citation during combat in Korea. Following the 1953 truce, the squadron returned to Japan, serving as an air defense unit until inactivating in December 1957.

The squadron was activated as the 39th Tactical Reconnaissance Training Squadron in 1969 when Tactical Air Command replaced its Command controlled (4 digit) units with Air Force controlled units. It trained Douglas B-66 Destroyer aircrews until inactivating in 1974.

The squadron has been a flying training unit since 1990, except for a brief stint as a test squadron.

== Mission ==
It operates the Beechcraft T-6 Texan II, Raytheon T-1A Jayhawk and Northrop T-38 Talon aircraft conducting Pilot Instructor Training.

== History ==
=== World War II ===
Activated by Northeast Air District (later First Air Force) as the 39th Pursuit Squadron, a Bell P-39 pursuit squadron, at Selfridge Field, Michigan, where it was one of a number of units drawing its cadre from the 1st Pursuit Group, stationed there. The squadron moved to Baer Field, Indiana the day before the attack on Pearl Harbor, but was soon rushed to Bellingham Army Air Field, where it flew antisubmarine patrols off the coast of Washington until the middle of January 1942, when it was reassigned from the 31st Pursuit Group to the 35th Pursuit Group, which was preparing for deployment to Australia.

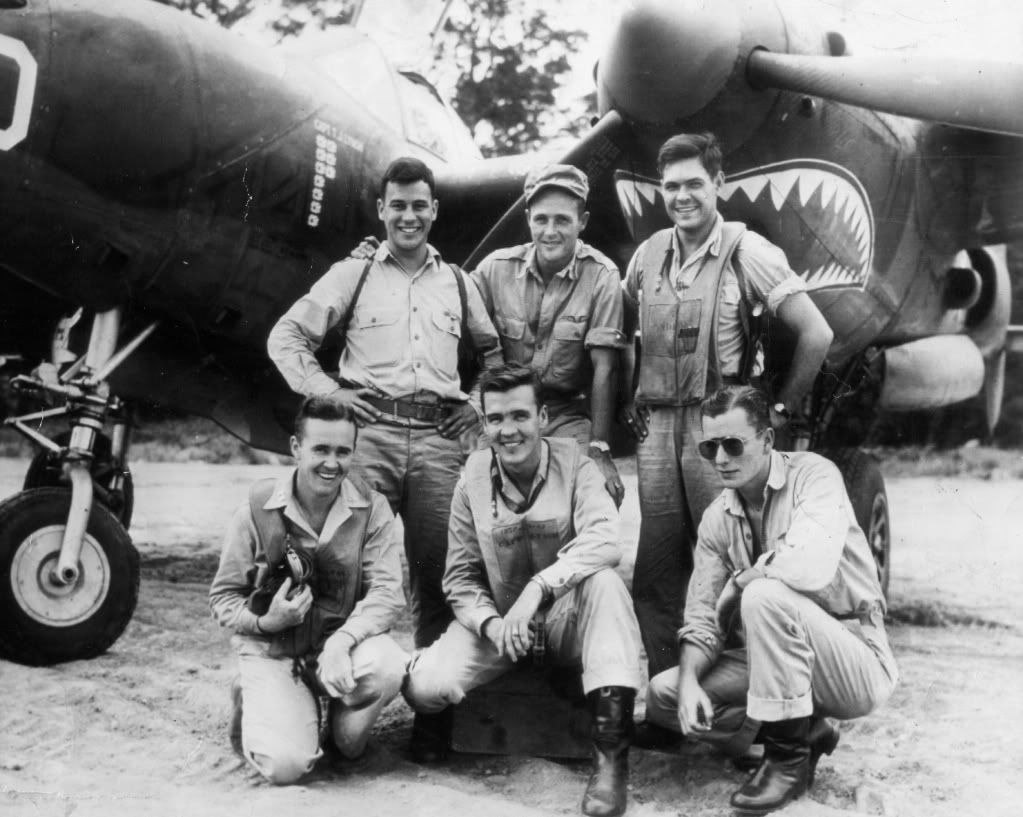
Aces of the 39th FS at Schwimmer Airfield, May 1943, in front of squadron commander Thomas J. Lynch's P-38 number 10. Kneeling, left to right: Captain Charles P. O'Sullivan, Captain Thomas J. Lynch, 1st Lieutenant Kenneth C. Sparks. Standing, left to right: Captain Richard C. Suehr, 1st Lieutenant John H. Lane, 1st Lieutenant Stanley O. Andrews

Re-equipped with long-range Lockheed P-38 Lightnings and deployed to Fifth Air Force in Australia, June 1942 under the command of the 35th Fighter Group. Began combat operations against the Japanese in the Lightning from their base in Sydney, Australia, 4 May 1942 them moving to Port Moresby, New Guinea, 22 Jul 1942. In late 1943 they converted to the Republic P-47 Thunderbolt. Participated in offensives in the Netherlands East Indies, New Guinea, Bismarck Archipelago, Philippines and the Battle of Okinawa.

=== Far East Air Forces ===
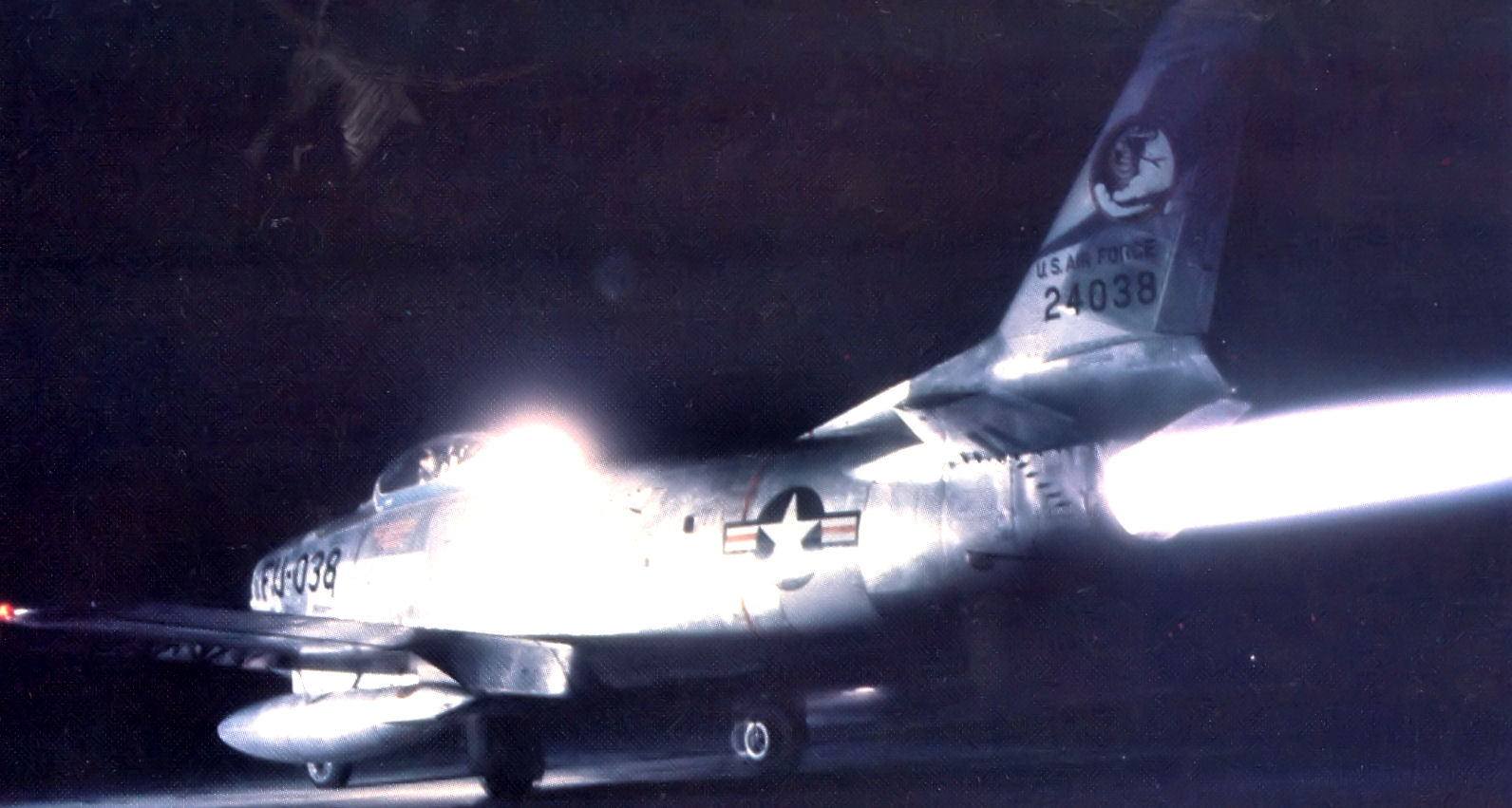
Squadron F-86D at Yokota AB (Note: Aircraft is North American F-86D Sabre serial 52-4038. Taken in 1955.)

Re-equipped with North American P-51 Mustangs and moved to Japan as part of the army of occupation, September 1945, remaining as part of the Far East Air Forces air defense mission throughout the postwar era. Engaged in combat, June 1950, during the initial actions of the Korean War. Re-equipped with Lockheed F-80 Shooting Star jets, fighting air-to-air combat against communist aircraft and engaging in ground support missions supporting United Nations Forces, 1950–1953. Returned to Japan after the 1953 armistice and upgraded to the purpose-built Lockheed F-94 Starfire interceptor flying air defense missions.

The squadron moved to Johnson Air Base on 20 July 1954 and established temporary air defense detachments on the same day at Komaki Air Base, (Note: Maurer, Combat Squadrons, p. 183. Haulman misspells this as Komati.) Japan to 4 August 1954 and at Misawa Air Base, Japan to 27 August 1954. The squadron was inactivated in December 1957.

=== Tactical Air Command ===
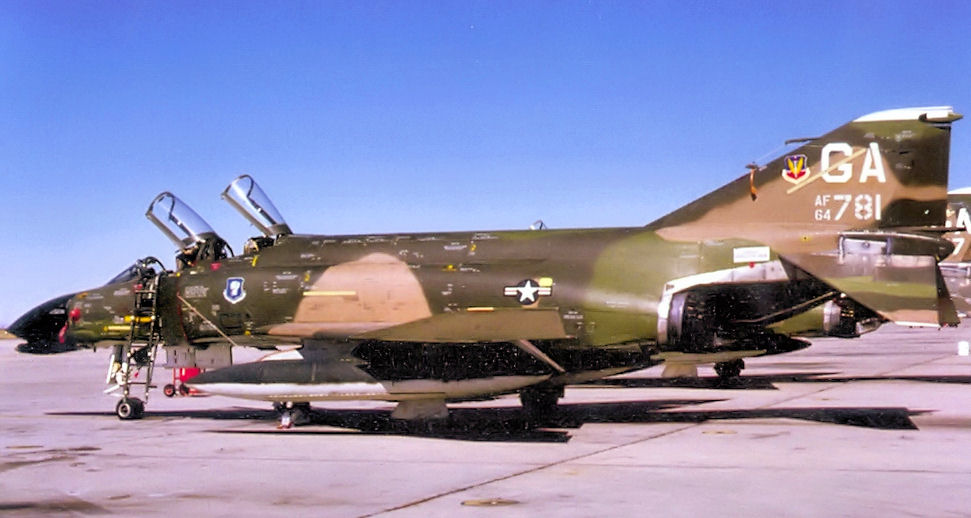
39th TFTS F-4C at George AFB (Note: Aircraft is McDonnell F-4C-23-MC, serial 64-781. Taken about 1980.)

Reactivated by Tactical Air Command in 1969 at Shaw Air Force Base, South Carolina, assuming the personnel and equipment of the 4417th Combat Crew Training Squadron. Equipped with reconnaissance and electronic warfare versions of the Douglas B-66 Destroyer and trained tactical reconnaissance and electronic warfare crews from, 1969–1974 when the B-66 was retired. Moved to George Air Force Base, California and equipped with McDonnell F-4E Phantom IIs. Trained Wild Weasel aircrews in surface to air missile suppression tactics from, 1977–1984. Inactivated when the F-4 was retired.

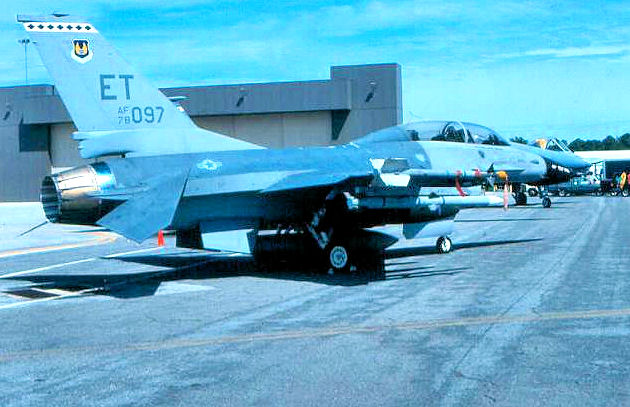
39th Test Squadron F-16 (Note: Aircraft is General Dynamics F-16B Block 1 Fighting Falcon serial 78-97, about 1995. The oldest active F-16 in the USAF inventory, originally delivered to the 388th Tactical Fighter Wing at Hill AFB in 1979.)

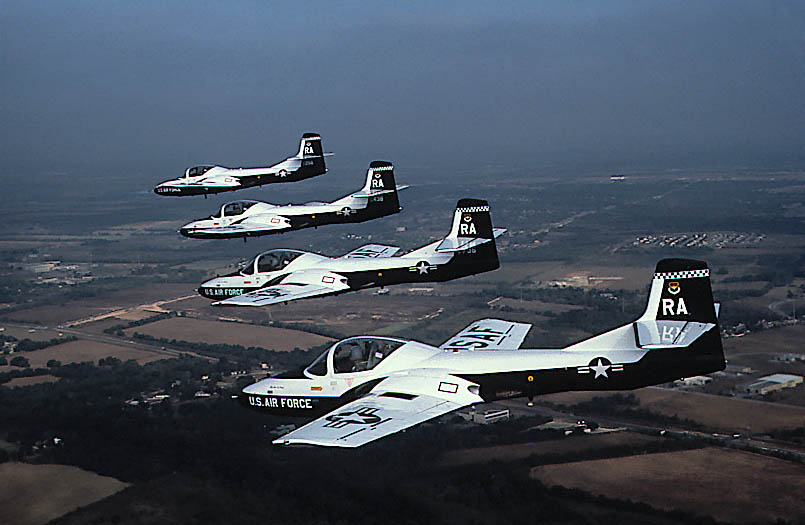
39th FTS formation flying

Reactivated by Air Training Command as an undergraduate pilot training squadron with Northrop T-38 Talons, 1990–1991. Transferred to Air Force Materiel Command, 1993 as a flight test squadron on various weapons systems from 1993 to 1999, then went back to Air Education and Training Command providing flying training from 2001 till 2007 where it was transferred to the Air Force Reserve Command.

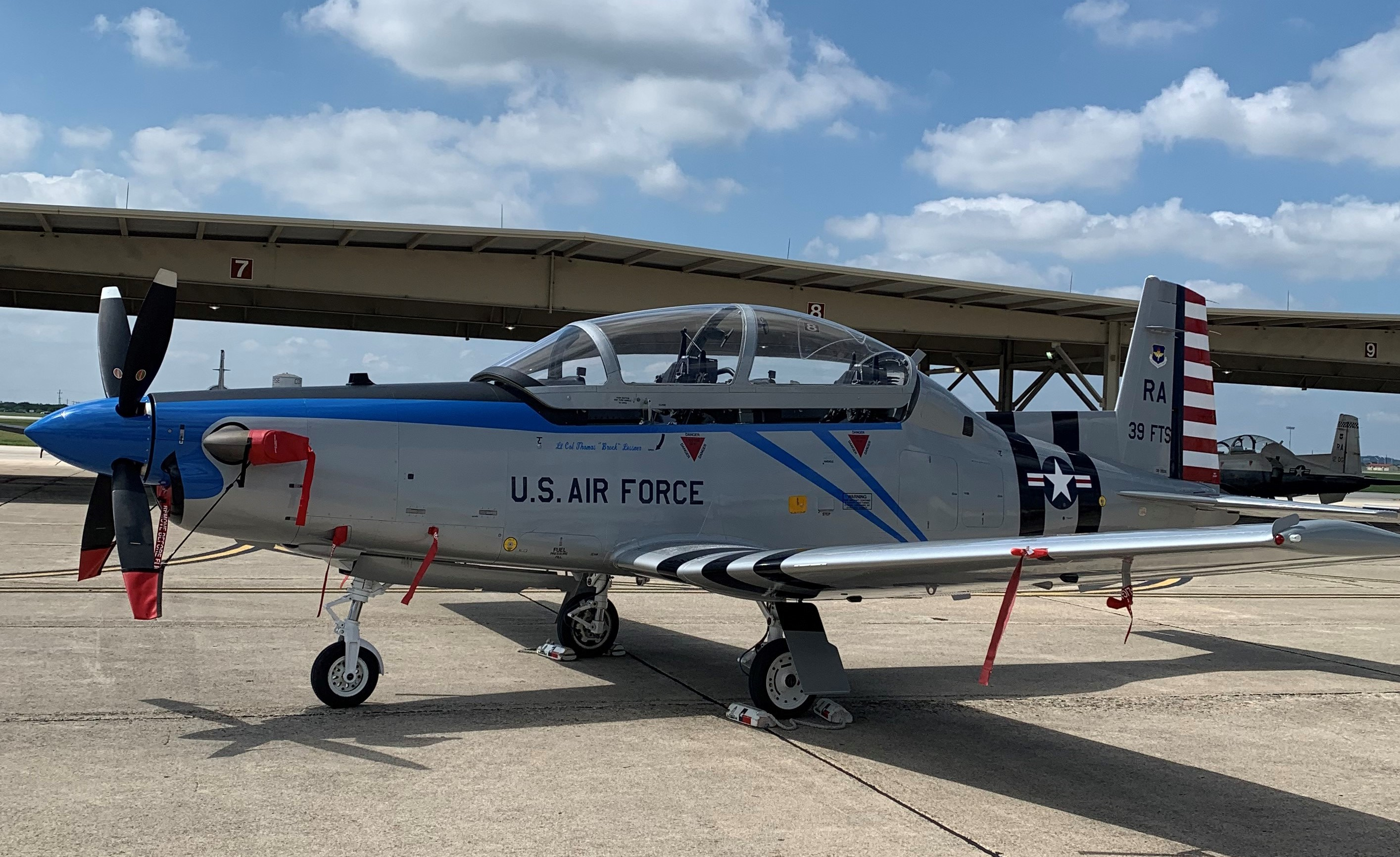
39th FTS T-6 painted in colors of former commander Leroy V. Grosshuesch's P-51, October 2020

== Lineage ==
- Constituted as the 39th Pursuit Squadron (Interceptor) on 22 December 1939

Activated on 1 February 1940
Redesignated 39th Fighter Squadron on 15 May 1942
Redesignated 39th Fighter Squadron (Twin Engine) on 27 October 1942
Redesignated 39th Fighter Squadron, Single Engine on 19 February 1944
Redesignated 39th Fighter-Interceptor Squadron on 20 January 1950
Inactivated on 8 December 1957

- Redesignated 39th Tactical Reconnaissance Training Squadron on 18 August 1969

Organized on 15 October 1969
Redesignated 39th Tactical Electronic Warfare Training Squadron on 15 February 1970 (Note: The 39th Tactical Electronic Warfare Training Squadron is not related to the 39th Tactical Electronic Warfare Squadron, which was constituted on 18 March 1969 and activated 1 April 1969 at Spangdahlem Air Base, and inactivated 1 January 1973.)
Inactivated on 15 March 1974

- Redesignated 39th Tactical Fighter Training Squadron on 1 June 1977

Activated on 1 July 1977
Redesignated 39th Tactical Fighter Squadron on 9 October 1980
Inactivated on 11 May 1984

- Redesignated 39th Flying Training Squadron on 9 February 1990

Activated on 2 April 1990
Inactivated on 15 December 1991

- Redesignated 39th Test Squadron on 31 August 1993

Activated on 8 September 1993
Redesignated 39th Flight Test Squadron on 15 March 1994
Inactivated on 1 September 1999

- Redesignated 39th Flying Training Squadron on 30 September 1999

Activated in the reserve on 2 April 2001

=== Assignments ===
- 31st Pursuit Group, 1 February 1940
- 35th Pursuit Group (later 35th Fighter Group, 35th Fighter-Interceptor Group), 15 January 1942 (attached to 18th Fighter-Bomber Wing, 7 May 1951; 51st Fighter-Interceptor Wing, 1 June 1952 – 14 July 1954)
- 41st Air Division, 1 October–8 December 1957
- 363d Tactical Reconnaissance Wing, 15 October 1969 – 15 March 1974 (attached to 36th Tactical Fighter Wing, 1 April 1969 – 31 December 1971)
- 35th Tactical Fighter Wing, 1 July 1977 – 11 May 1984
- 47th Flying Training Wing, 2 April 1990 – 15 December 1991
- 46th Operations Group, 8 September 1993 – 1 September 1999
- 340th Flying Training Group, 2 April 2001 – present

=== Stations ===
- Selfridge Field, Michigan, 1 February 1940
- Baer Field, Indiana, 6 December 1941
- Bellingham Army Air Field, Washington, 10 December 1941 – 23 January 1942
- Brisbane Airport, Australia, 25 February 1942
- Ballarat Airport, Australia, 8 March 1942
- Mount Gambier Airport, Australia, 16 March 1942
- RAAF Base Williamtown, Australia, 3 April 1942
- Donnington Airpark, Australia, 20 April 1942
- Port Moresby Airfield Complex New Guinea, 2 June 1942
- RAAF Base Townsville, Australia, 26 July 1942
- Port Moresby Airfield Complex New Guinea, 18 October 1942
- Nadzab Airfield, New Guinea, 15 December 1943
- Gusap Airfield, New Guinea, 27 January 1944
- Nadzab Airfield, New Guinea, 9 June 1944
- Kornasoren Airfield, Noemfoor, Schouten Islands, 7 August 1944
- Owi Airfield, Schouten Islands, Netherlands East Indies, 12 September 1944
- Wama Drome, Morotai, Moluccas Islands, Netherlands East Indies, 23 October 1944
- Mangaldan Airfield, Luzon, Philippines, 22 January 1945
- Lingayen Airfield, Luzon, Philippines, c. 10 April 1945
- Clark Field, Luzon, Philippines, 21 April 1945
- Yontan Airfield, Okinawa, 30 June 1945
- Irumagawa Air Base, Japan, 10 October 1945
- Yokota Air Base, Japan, c. 1 April 1950
- Ashiya Air Base, Japan, 8 July 1950
- Pohang Air Base, South Korea, 7 August 1950
- Tsuiki Air Base, Japan, 14 August 1950
- Pohang Air Base, South Korea, 3 October 1950
- Yonpo Airfield, North Korea, 19 November 1950
- Pusan Air Base, South Korea, 7 December 1950
- Chinhae Air Base, South Korea, 12 May 1951
- Suwon Air Base, South Korea, 1 June 1952
- Johnson Air Base, Japan, 20 July 1954
- Yokota Air Base, Japan, 31 July 1954
- Komaki Air Base, Japan, 25 August 1955 – 8 December 1957
- Shaw Air Force Base, South Carolina, 15 October 1969 – 15 March 1974
- George Air Force Base, California, 1 July 1977 – 11 May 1984
- Laughlin Air Force Base, Texas, 2 April 1990 – 15 December 1991
- Eglin Air Force Base, Florida, 8 September 1993 – 1 September 1999
- Moody Air Force Base, Georgia, 2 April 2001
- Randolph Air Force Base, (later, Joint Base San Antonio-Randolph), Texas, 13 September 2007 – present)

=== Aircraft ===
- Seversky P-35 Guardsman (1940–1941)
- Curtiss P-36 Hawk (1940–1941)
- Bell P-39 Airacobra (1941–1942)
- Lockheed P-38 Lightning (1942–1943)
- Republic P-47 Thunderbolt (1943–1944)
- North American P-51 Mustang (later F-51) (1944–1945, 1945–1952)
- Lockheed F-80 Shooting Star (1950)
- North American F-86D Sabre (1952–1957)
- Lockheed F-94 Starfire (1954)
- Douglas RB-66 Destroyer (1969–1970)
- Douglas WB-66 Destroyer (1969–1970)
- Douglas EB-66 Destroyer (1970–1974)
- McDonnell F-4 Phantom II (1977–1980, 1982–1984)
- Republic F-105 Thunderchief (1977)
- Cessna T-37 Tweet (1990–1991)
- Northrop T-38 Talon (1990–1991, 2001–present)
- General Dynamics F-16 Fighting Falcon (1993–1999)
- Boeing B-52 Stratofortress (1995–1999)
- Fairchild Republic A-10 Thunderbolt II (1999)
- Beechcraft T-6 Texan II (2001–present)
- Raytheon T-1A Jayhawk (2007–present)

== Notable members ==
- Charles Peter O'Sullivan, Squadron commander in World War II
