= Milton Crenchaw =

American Tuskegee Airman aviator (1919–2015)

- Crenshaw in a WWII era photo
- Born: Milton Pitts Crenchaw; January 13, 1919; Little Rock, Arkansas U.S.
- Died: November 17, 2015 (aged 96); Atlanta, Georgia U.S.
- Spouse: Ruby (née Hockenhull
- Relatives: Children: Dolores, Erwin, Countess and Milton
- Military career
- Allegiance: United States of America
- Branch: United States Army Air Force
- Service years: 1941-1972
- Unit: Tuskegee Army Air Field
- Commands: Flight instructor
- Awards: Congressional Gold Medal awarded to the Tuskegee Airmen; Arkansas Aviation Hall of Fame

Milton Pitts Crenchaw (January 13, 1919 – November 17, 2015) was an American aviator who served with the Tuskegee Airmen during World War II and was the first Arkansan to be trained by the federal government as a civilian licensed pilot. He served during World War II as a civilian flight instructor. He was one of the two original supervising squadron members. In 1998 he was inducted into the Arkansas Aviation Hall of Fame. The grandson of a slave, he was known as the "father of black aviation in Arkansas" who broke through color barriers in the military.

== Early life ==
Crenchaw was born to Reverend Joseph C. Crenchaw and Ethel Pitts Crenchaw at Little Rock, Arkansas, in 1919. His father was a local civil rights leader with the NAACP His grandfather was a slave. In 1937 he graduated from Dunbar High School in Arkansas. He enrolled at the Tuskegee Institute in 1939, to study auto mechanics.

Crenchaw and Ruby Hockenhull were married on December 22, 1942 in Tuskegee, Alabama. They had 3 children: Dolores, Countess, and their son Milton.

== Aviation career ==
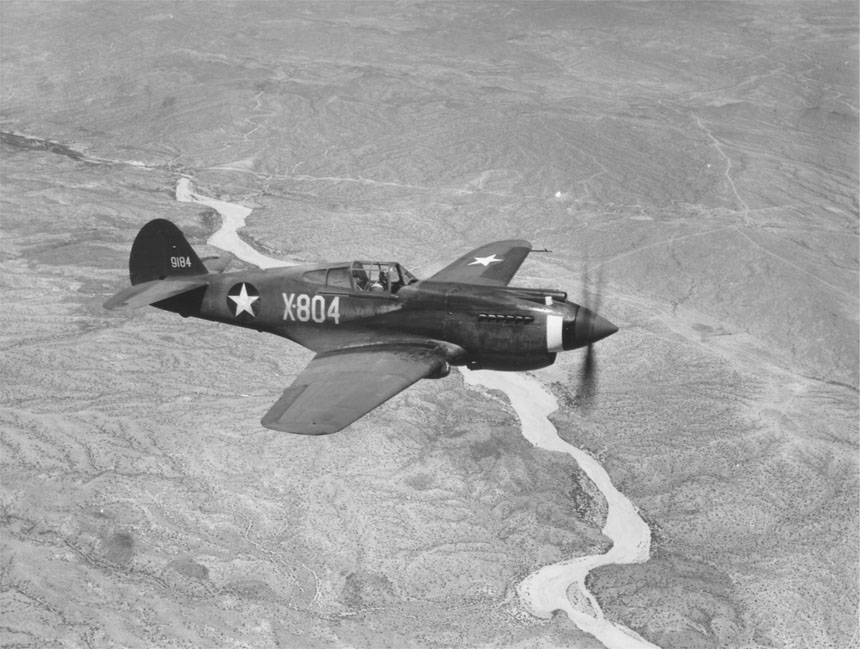
Crenchaw trained pilots on the P-40 aircraft. (Note: The Tuskegee Airmen trained with the P-40 aircraft. Later the Tuskegee Airmen became known for flying the P-51 aircraft with red markings that distinguished the Tuskegee Airmen included red bands on the noses of P-51s as well as a red rudder; their P-51B and D Mustangs flew with similar color schemes, with red propeller spinners, yellow wing bands and all-red tail surfaces.)

Crenchaw went from living the life of a college student to flying in the Civilian Pilot Training Program (CPTP). The CPTP was sponsored by the Army Air Corps under the auspices of the Civil Aeronautics Authority; after the start of WWII in Europe in 1939, there were very few combat pilots in the US and the AAC wanted to increase the number as insurance against any future conflict involving the United States. Crenchaw passed the CAA examination to become a licensed flight instructor on December 8, 1941, one day after the attack on Pearl Harbor. He soon after transferred to program at Moton Field, home of the Tuskegee Airmen.

Crenshaw was named Primary Flight Instructor in 1942 at Tuskegee Army Air Field in Tuskegee, Alabama. He was one of the two original supervising squadron members under Chief Pilot Charles A. Anderson. Anderson was the first African-American man to have a private pilot license.

Crenchaw was instrumental in the creation of the first flight program at Philander Smith College from 1947 to 1953 where he continued to teach pilots.

Crenchaw worked for the federal government for 40 years, from 1941 to 1983, first with the U.S. Army Air Corps, which transitioned to the U.S. Air Force. Toward the end of his career he was an equal-opportunity officer in the Department of Defense and as a race-relations officer at Fort Stewart in Georgia.

United States Senator John Boozman (Arkansas) honored Crenchaw with a citation in the Congressional Record in 2015. He said that "Crenchaw helped break the barriers that existed in the military", a pioneer who "paved the way for integration in the United States Military and impacted generations of aviators".

== Death ==
Crenchaw had a heart attack on November 14, 2015, he was transported to the hospital and he died from complications related to pneumonia and cardiovascular disease, Tuesday November 17, 2015. He was buried on December 1, 2015 at Arkansas State Veterans Cemetery in North Little Rock. A memorial ceremony was held at the state capital attended by Arkansas lawmakers and officials. His family were given citations from the House and Senate honoring his life, and a portrait of Crenchaw was displayed for one week at the capital.

== Awards and honors ==
- 1998 Arkansas Aviation Hall of Fame
- 2006 Congressional Gold Medal, awarded to Tuskegee Airmen
- 2007 Arkansas Black Hall of Fame
- 2017 The Technical wing of a high school in Little Rock was named after Milton Crenchaw

== See also ==
- Executive Order 9981
- Military history of African Americans
- List of Tuskegee Airmen Cadet Pilot Graduation Classes
- List of Tuskegee Airmen
- The Tuskegee Airmen (movie)
