= Arkansas Aviation Historical Society =

Arkansas Aviation Historical Society is a non-profit organization promoting aviation. It created the Arkansas Aviation Hall of Fame in 1980, and recently created college scholarships in hopes of encouraging young people to pursue aviation careers. The Aviation Hall of Fame honors individuals who played a great role in aviation and aerospace history on the national or Arkansas scene. Records are hosted by Butler Center for Arkansas Studies, Arkansas Studies Institute, Central Arkansas Library System, in Little Rock, Arkansas.

== History ==
New members to the Hall of Fame were inducted annually from 1980 to 2010, and again in 2015. Arkansas Aviation Hall of Fame inductees for 2015 were Jim Gaston, John Knight and James R. Risner. The hall of fame was based at the new Aerospace Education Center, 3301 East Roosevelt Road, Little Rock, Arkansas, near Little Rock National Airport, in 1995. When the Aerospace Education Center closed its doors on January 1, 2011, records were moved to the Butler Center for Arkansas Studies, Arkansas Studies Institute, which still hosts the records.

In 2015, the society awarded its first two scholarships, while expressing the need for aviators to support the dreams of potential young pilots. Two students at Arkansas' collegiate aviation school, Henderson State University in Arkadelphia, received scholarships of $2,000 each.

== Hall of Fame Inductees ==
1980 J. Caroll Cone, Nathan Gordon, Louise McPhetridge Thaden, James S. McDonnell Jr., Charles M. Taylor

1981 Leighton Collins, Case Hough, Robert Snowden Jr., Admiral John S. Thach

1982 Raymond J. Ellis, Captain Field Kindley, Claude Holbert

1983 Major General Earl T. Ricks Jr., Lynn Helms, Albert A. Vollmecke

1984 Brig. Gen. John D. Howe, Major General Winston P. Wilson, Eddie Holland

1985 Brigadier General William T. Seawell, General John Paul McConnell, Major Pierce W. McKennon

1986 Major General Frank A. Bailey, M.T. “Cy” Bond, Earl Rowland

1987 Major John H. White, Lucien M. Tallac

1988 Richard Collins, Lt. Wendel A. Robertson

1989 Captain E. Scott McCuskey, Sanford N. McDonnell

1990 Rear Admiral George M. "Skip" Furlong Jr., John Paul Hammerschmidt

1991 Rear Admiral F. Taylor Brown, Frederick Smith

1992 Adm. William Newell Small, Lieutenant Colonel Woodrow W. Crockett

1993 Emma W. Hall, Seth Ward

1994 Lieutenant Colonel Hugh Mills, James Rodgers, Jack Stephens

1995 Colonel Richard O. Covey USAF, Floyd Fulkerson, Gov. Winthrop Rockefeller

1996 Maj. Gen. Lewis E. Lyle, Lieutenant Roy Rushing, Issac T. Gilliam IV

1997 Houston J. Burford, Richard C. Butler, Harvey C. Couch Jr., Wheat Goss, Bart Gray, Dr. Lafayette Harris, Harry W. Pfeifer Jr., Arthur Phillips, Jack Pickens, John Potts, Raymond Rebsamen, J. V. Satterfield, Howard Stebbins III, Everett Tucker Jr., and Kenneth Pat Wilson

1998 Milton P. Crenchaw, J. Scott Hamilton, Colonel Charles Peter O'Sullivan

1999 Frank G. Tinker Jr., Fred K. Darragh Jr., Gen. Horace M. Wade

2000 Jim Burnett, Anthony DeSalvo, Lieutenant General Charles R. Hamm

2001 Alice Walton, Jim Younkin

2002 Rodney Slater, H.A. Thomas

2003 Thomas N. Smith Jr., Brigadier General William H. Webster, Captain Wilbur West

2004 Lieutenant Colonel Robert Hite, James Stamps, Robert M. Wilson

2005 Marlon D. Green, Virginia "Mary" Proctor, Daryl Riddell

2006 Richard N. Holbert, Donald L. Holbert, Robert A. Younkin

2007 Adolphus H. "Pat" Bledsoe Jr., Zemery Melvern "Jack" Stell, Dennis R. Gardisser Ph.D., P.E.

2008 Paul Irving "Pappy" Gunn, Scott E. Parazynski M.D.

2009 Greg Arnold, Colonel Billy G. Edens

2010 Brigadier General Paul Page Douglas Jr., James C. "Bud" Mars, Mary F. Silitch

2015 Jim Gaston, John Knight and James R. Risner

2016 Lynn C Hooper, David Wallace, Jesse Vincent

2017 Zane Anderson, Harold Johnson, General William Smith

2018 Gwen Batie Blue, Cornelius Robinson Coffey, Ernest Ambort, Dr. Jerry Robinson

2019 Ronald L. Herron, Russ Amos, J.O. Dockery, Don Clark Ruggles, Dennis F. Cantrell,
