= Leroy V. Grosshuesch =

American military officer (1920–2015)

- Born: May 6, 1920; Menno, South Dakota, US
- Died: May 7, 2015 (aged 95); Kailua, Hawaii, US
- Military career
- Allegiance: United States of America
- Branch: United States Army Air Forces; United States Air Force
- Service years: 1942-73
- Rank: Colonel
- Commands: 39th Fighter Squadron; 61st Fighter Squadron; 335th Fighter Squadron; 452nd Fighter-Day Squadron; 36th Fighter-Bomber Squadron
- Conflicts: World War II; Vietnam War
- Awards: Silver Star; Legion of Merit; Distinguished Flying Cross (2)

Colonel Leroy Victor Grosshuesch (May 6, 1920 – May 7, 2015) was a United States Air Force officer who served in World War II and the Vietnam War, achieving Flying ace status in the Pacific Theater with eight kills.

== Biography ==
Grosshuesch was born on 6 May 1920, in Menno, South Dakota. He graduated from Yankton High School and attended the University of Maryland.

Grosshuesch enlisted in the United States Army in January 1942 and was assigned to the Quartermaster Corps. In October 1942, he became an aviation cadet. He qualified as a pilot at Selma Army Airfield and was commissioned as a Second Lieutenant in the United States Army Air Forces on 28 July 1943. He was assigned to the 439th Fight Squadron at Dale Mabry Field converting to fly the P-47 Thunderbolt.

In November 1943, Grosshuesch was assigned to the 39th Fighter Squadron in New Guinea. On 21 November 1944, he achieved his first kill, shooting down a Mitsubishi Ki-46 over Negros Island. On 30 January 1945, he shot down two biplane trainers west of Taicha Airfield, Formosa. On 10 February, he shot down a further two biplane trainers and another Ki-46 over Formosa. On 25 February, he shot down another Ki-46 west of Formosa.

By late July 1945, the 39th Fighter Squadron had converted to flying the P-51 Mustang and the squadron was operating from Yontan Airfield on Okinawa. Multiple sources state that on 30 July Grosshuesch was credited with single-handedly sinking an Imperial Japanese Navy (IJN) Destroyer off Goto Retto island. However, the official joint U.S. Army/Navy records of IJN ship losses state that the only IJN ships sunk on 30 July were the Escort ship Okinawa sunk by Navy carrier aircraft near Maizuru and the Destroyer Hatsushimo sunk by USAAF aircraft, near Miyazu.

On 12 August, Grosshuesch made his eighth and final kill shooting down a Nakajima Ki-84. Grosshuesch was one of 25 pilots interviewed for the Fifth Air Force military monograph Fighter Combat Tactics in the Southwest Pacific Area, which was prepared to assist newer pilots arriving in the Pacific Theater.

After serving occupation duty in Japan, Grosshuesch returned to the U.S. in August 1946 and was assigned to the 61st Fighter Squadron at Selfridge Field. In April 1947, he transferred to the 335th Fighter Squadron at Andrews Field and converted to the P-80 Shooting Star.

From April 1949 to April 1951, Grosshuesch was assigned to the USAF Group, American Mission for Aid to Turkey, in Ankara.

In July 1954, Grosshuesch was given command of the 452nd Fighter-Day Squadron at Foster Air Force Base flying F-86 Sabres. In June 1955, he was appointed commander of the 36th Fighter-Bomber Squadron at Itazuke Air Base, flying F-86F Sabres and then F-100 Super Sabres.

Grosshuesch graduated from Air Command and Staff College in August 1959 and then from Air War College in 1964.

In July 1964, Grosshuesch was assigned to South Vietnam where served as commander of the Special Air Operations Group.

From August 1965 to July 1968, Grosshuesch served at Headquarters, Pacific Air Forces at Hickam Air Force Base, Hawaii as Deputy Director, Operations Plans. In July 1970, he returned to Hickam as Director, Operations Plans.

Grosshuesch retired from the Air Force in May 1973.

After retiring, Grosshuesch worked for the Weyerhaeuser in Honolulu, Hawaii, until retiring in July 1992. He and his wife lived in Kailua, until his death on May 7, 2015, aged 95.

== Decorations ==
His decorations included the Silver Star, Legion of Merit and Distinguished Flying Cross (2)
