= Pierce McKennon =

Pierce Winningham "Mac" McKennon
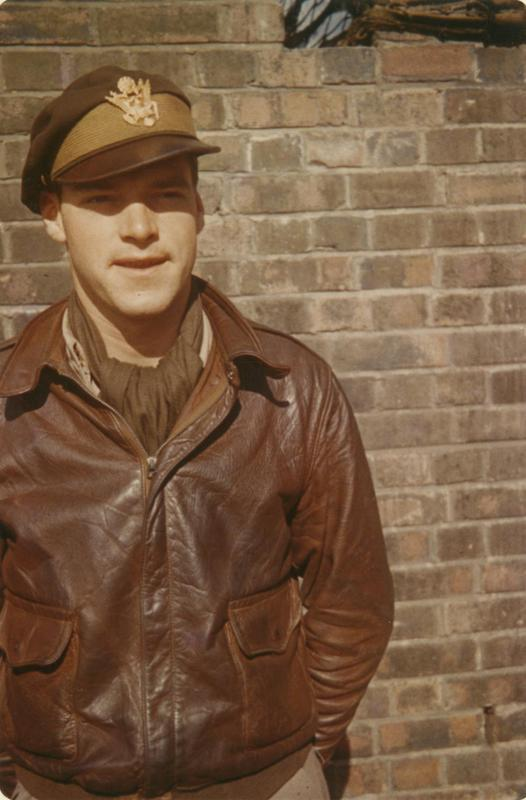
- Born: November 30, 1919; Clarksville, Arkansas, US
- Died: June 18, 1947 (aged 27); San Antonio, Texas, US
- Burial place: Forest Park Cemetery; Fort Smith, Arkansas
- Military career
- Allegiance: United States
- Branch: United States Army Air Forces
- Rank: Major
- Nickname: "Mac"
- Unit: 4th Fighter Group
- Commands: 335th Fighter Squadron
- Conflicts: World War II
- Awards: Distinguished Flying Cross (5); Air Medal (17); Purple Heart; Croix de guerre (France)

Pierce Winningham McKennon (November 30, 1919 – June 18, 1947) was an American flying ace of World War II with 12 aerial victories and 9.83 ground victories.

== Early life ==
Pierce McKennon was born in Clarksville, Johnson County, Arkansas, on November 30, 1919. He was a gifted musician and entered the University of Arkansas in 1938, but performed poorly and left a year later. He later returned to the university but never graduated.

== World War II ==
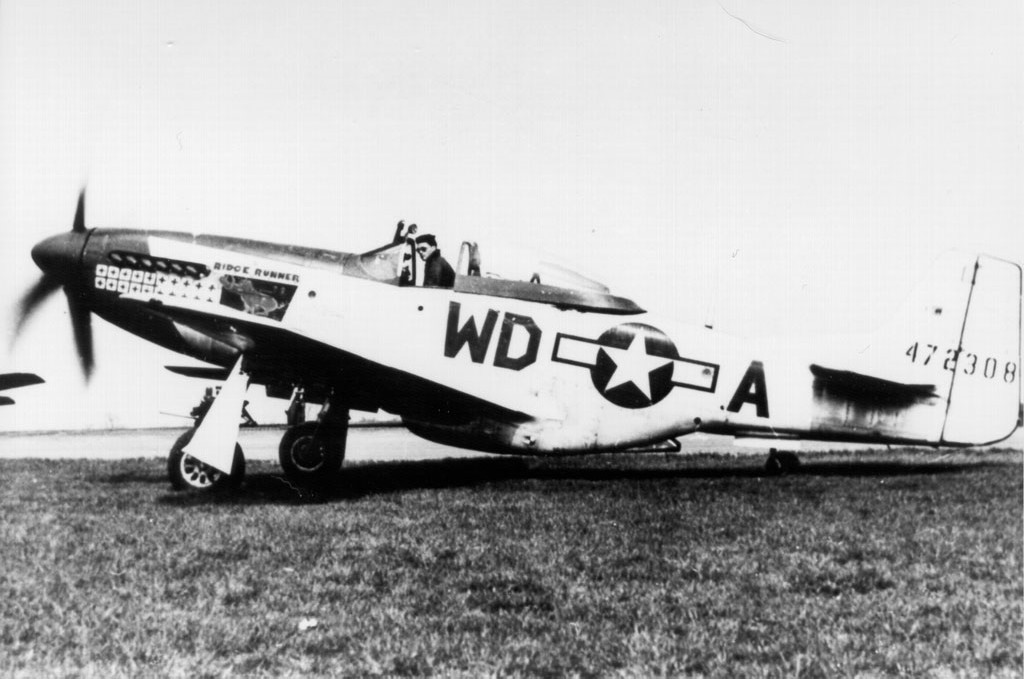
Pierce McKennon in his P-51D-20-NA Mustang 44-72308 nicknamed "Ridge Runner III"

McKennon entered the U.S. Army Air Corps in early 1941 hoping to become a pilot but was refused because of insufficient aptitude. He then enrolled in the Royal Canadian Air Force where he successfully underwent pilot training and became a sergeant pilot by the end of 1941. He was sent to England and became a member of the famous Eagle Squadron, training with the Royal Air Force throughout 1942. In November 1942, he was transferred back to the United States Army Air Force with the rank of second lieutenant.

He was assigned to the 335th Fighter Squadron of the 4th Fighter Group based at Debden near London. McKennon quickly proved his worth as a fighter pilot, shooting down four enemy aircraft while flying the P-47 Thunderbolt. His group then transitioned to the P-51 Mustang, in which on March 6, 1944, he downed a fifth enemy plane and earned his designation as an ace. McKennon subsequently served as flight commander and destroyed several other enemy aircraft.

After a promotion to captain, McKennon took command of the 335th Fighter Squadron. He was shot down by flak on August 28, 1944, near Niederbronn, France, and bailed out safely. With the help of the French resistance, he evaded capture and safely returned to London on September 24, 1944. This time a major, he was shot down again while attacking ground targets near Berlin on March 18, 1945. His wingman, Lt. George Green, landed in a nearby field to pick him up. The two pilots disposed of their parachutes to make room, and McKennon flew back to Debden sitting on Green's lap. During the strafing/escort mission on April 16, 1945, his aircraft was once again hit by enemy AA fire and wounded.

When the war ended, McKennon was credited with 12 aerial victories and 9.83 ground victories. This odd fraction is explained by the fact that McKennon shared one victory with another pilot (1/2 victory = .50) and another one with two other pilots (1/3 = .33).

== Post war ==
McKennon stayed in Europe until April 1946, and returned to the United States to become a flight instructor. He married Beulah Irene Sawyer on May 13, 1946, and the couple had one son. McKennon and a student pilot were killed in a training accident on June 18, 1947, when their airplane, AT-6D-NT, 44-81417, of the 2532d AAF Base Unit, Randolph Field, Texas, crashed 2 miles W of Marion, Texas, near San Antonio.

The Arkansas Aviation Historical Society inducted McKennon into the Arkansas Aviation Hall of Fame in 1985.

== Awards and decorations ==
USAAF pilot badge
Distinguished Flying Cross with four bronze oak leaf clusters
Purple Heart
Air Medal with three silver and one bronze oak leaf clusters
American Defense Service Medal
American Campaign Medal
European-African-Middle Eastern Campaign Medal with silver and bronze campaign stars
World War II Victory Medal
Army of Occupation Medal with 'Germany' clasp
Croix de Guerre with Palm (France)
1939–1945 Star (United Kingdom)
War Medal 1939–1945 (United Kingdom)
Canadian Volunteer Service Medal

Army Presidential Unit Citation
