= Derek Boitel-Gill =

British flying ace of WWII

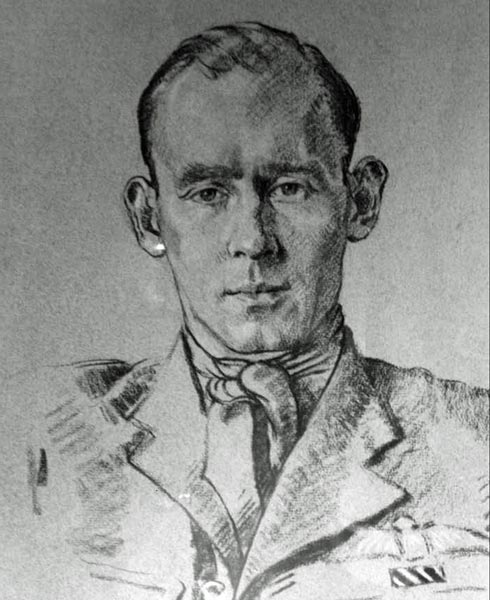
- Portrait of Boitel-Gill, made by Cuthbert Orde in 1940–41
- Born: 13 March 1911; Claygate, Surrey, England
- Died: 18 September 1941 (aged 30); Crosby-on-Eden, Cumbria, England
- Military career
- Allegiance: United Kingdom
- Branch: Royal Air Force
- Service years: 1929–1934; 1940–1941
- Rank: Wing commander
- Commands: No. 152 Squadron
- Conflicts: Second World War: Battle of Britain
- Awards: Distinguished Flying Cross

Derek Piette Aumale Boitel-Gill, DFC (13 March 1911 – 18 September 1941) was a British flying ace who served with the Royal Air Force (RAF) during the Second World War. He is credited with having shot down at least eight aircraft.

Born in Claygate, Surrey, Boitel-Gill joined the RAF in 1929 and served for five years before going onto the reserve. He then worked in civil aviation until he was called up for military service in April 1940, six months after the outbreak of the Second World War. He was posted to No. 152 Squadron and achieved a number of aerial victories during the Battle of Britain. The recipient of the Distinguished Flying Cross in October, he was appointed the commander of the squadron the following month. In June 1941, he was posted to No. 59 Operational Training Unit at Crosby-on-Eden. He was killed on 18 September in a flying accident.

== Early life ==
Derek Pierre Aumale Boitel-Gill was born in Claygate in Surrey, England, on 13 March 1911. He went to Milbourne Lodge School before going on to Steyne School in Worthing. He joined the Royal Air Force (RAF) in 1929, training at No. 5 Flying Training School at Sealand before being posted to No. 3 Squadron. At the time, the squadron was based at Upavon and operated the Bristol Bulldog biplane aircraft in both a day and night fighter role. He was promoted to flying officer in March 1931. He ended his service in the RAF in 1934, going onto the Reserve of Air Force Officers (RAFO).

Boitel-Gill pursued a career in civil aviation, flying for Imperial Airways. In March 1937 his twin-engined de Havilland DH.89 Dragon Rapide suffered an engine failure over the English Channel while flying in poor weather to Paris with a load of newspapers. He safely returned to England, landing at Lympne Airport instead of his port of origin, Croydon, but his radioman had to jettison much of the aircraft's cargo in order to maintain flying altitude. Another aircraft that departed Croydon with a cargo of newspapers at the same time as Boitel-Gill crashed, killing its crew. Later in the year he piloted the first flight for Northern Airways between London and Aberdeen. He subsequently went to British India, working for an Indian air line and also becoming the personal pilot of Mir Osman Ali Khan, the Nizam of Hyderabad. By this time he was married, to Katharine Buckley, and had at least one son.

== Second World War ==
In early April 1940, several months after the outbreak of the Second World War, Boitel-Gill was called up for service in the RAF as a flight lieutenant, having been promoted to this rank in April 1937 while in the RAFO. He was posted to No. 152 Squadron as one of its flight commanders. He was only here for a few weeks before being sent to No. 5 Operational Training Unit (OTU) at Ashton Down for familiarisation with the Supermarine Spitfire fighter. Once he completed his conversion course, he was put on the instructing staff at the OTU to help train pilots on the Boulton-Paul Defiant two-man fighter.

=== Battle of Britain ===
Boitel-Gill returned to No. 152 Squadron in late July. The squadron was heavily engaged in the Battle of Britain, operating Spitfires from Warmwell and tasked with interception duties over the English Channel and along the southern coast of England. Boitel-Gill achieved his first aerial victory on 12 August, when he destroyed a Junkers Ju 88 medium bomber over the Isle of Wight. This was followed three days later with his destruction of a Junkers Ju 87 dive bomber and a pair of Messerschmitt Bf 110 heavy fighters in the Portland region. In the afternoon of 18 August, now known as The Hardest Day, he was leading the squadron to the southeast of the Isle of Wight to intercept Ju 87s that had just attacked the airfield at Gosport and were flying back to France; he engaged and shot down one Ju 87, seeing it crash into the sea.

On 25 September Boitel-Gill destroyed a Ju 88 near Bournemouth and a Messerschmitt Bf 109 fighter over Portland. The next day he shot down a Ju 88 over the Isle of Wight. His last aerial victory was achieved on 19 October, when he and another pilot damaged a Ju 88 over Dorchester on 19 October. Three days later he was recognised for his successes in the fighting over England with an award of the Distinguished Flying Cross (DFC). The citation, published in The London Gazette, read:

In August, 1940, this officer, as leader of his squadron, intercepted an enemy formation consisting of thirty bombers which were escorted by some ninety fighters. As a result of his skilful leadership five of the enemy aircraft were destroyed, of which number Flight Lieutenant Boitel-Gill destroyed three. A further three enemy aircraft were damaged in the conflict. On a previous occasion Flight Lieutenant Boitel-Gill destroyed a Junkers 88.

— London Gazette, No. 34976, 22 October 1940

=== Later war service ===
In November, Boitel-Gill was appointed commander of No. 152 Squadron. He was subsequently promoted to temporary squadron leader on 1 December. Although by this time the Luftwaffe's offensive campaign against England had slowed, the squadron continued in a defensive role until April 1941, at which time it shifted to Portreath. From here it was engaged in flying protective patrols over shipping convoys. In June, it began night-fighting duties but mid-month Boitel-Gill was posted away.

Assigned to No. 59 OTU at Crosby-on-Eden on instructing duties, Boitel-Gill was promoted to wing commander. On 18 September 1941, he fatally crashed a Hawker Hurricane fighter while performing circuits of the airfield at the OTU to provide its anti-aircraft gunners with target practice. According to a witness, he may not have allowed sufficient clearance when pulling out of a dive.

Cremated at West Norwood Cemetery, Boitel-Gill's remains were interred in the screen wall there. He is credited with the destruction of eight German aircraft, with a share in one damaged.
