= 335th Fighter Squadron =

335th Fighter Squadron

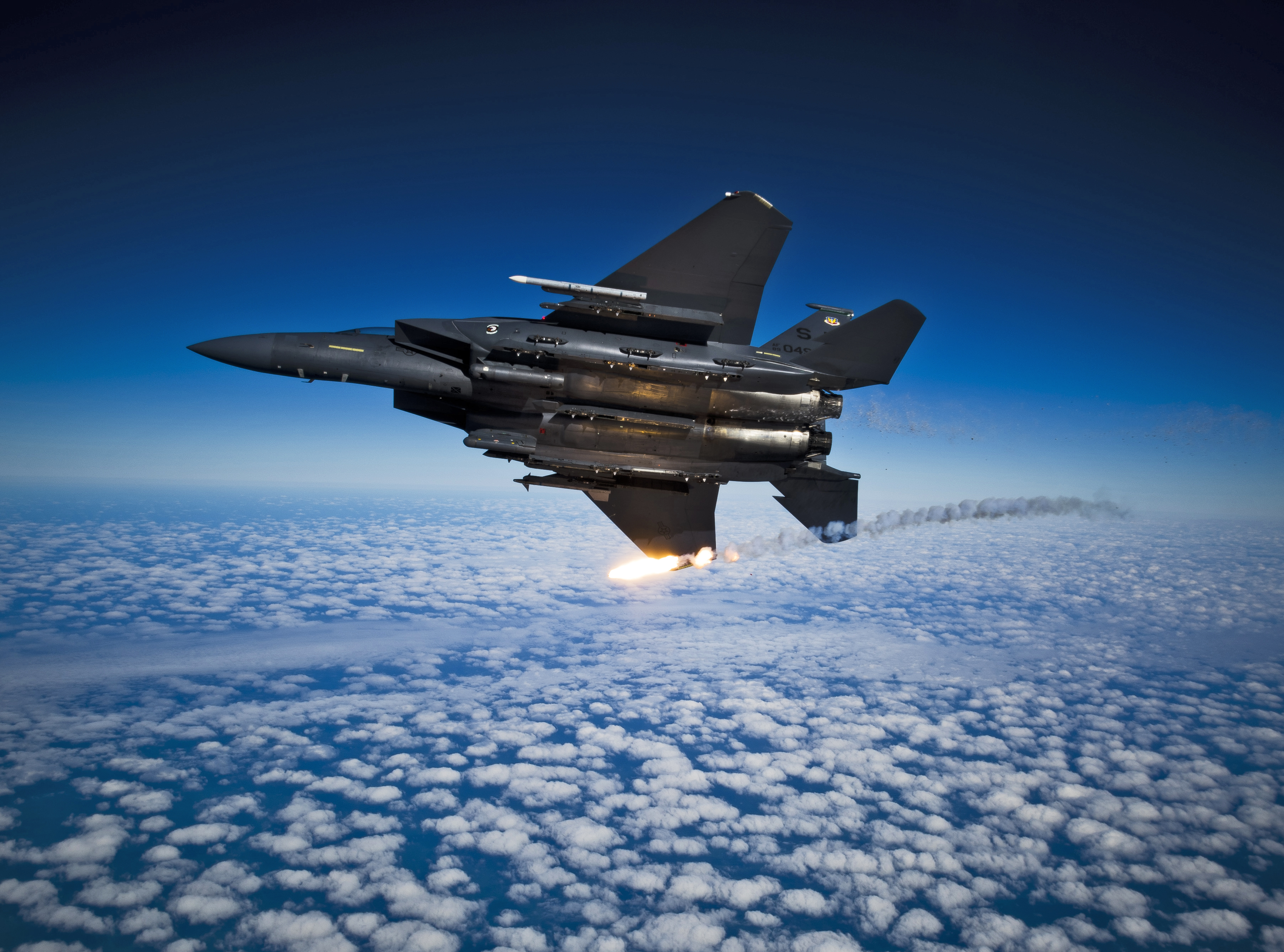
- 335th Fighter Squadron F-15E Strike Eagle releases flares during a training mission
- Active: 1942–1945; 1946–present
- Country: United States
- Branch: United States Air Force
- Role: Fighter
- Part of: Air Combat Command
- Garrison/HQ: Seymour Johnson Air Force Base
- Nickname: Chiefs
- Colors: Green
- Engagements: European Theater of Operations; Korean War; Vietnam War; Operation Desert Shield; Operation Desert Storm; Operation Southern Watch; Iraq War; Operation Enduring Freedom; Operation Inherent Resolve; April 2024 Iranian strikes against Israel
- Decorations: Distinguished Unit Citation; Presidential Unit Citation; Air Force Outstanding Unit Award with Combat "V" Device; Air Force Outstanding Unit Award; Republic of Korea Presidential Unit Citation; Republic of Vietnam Gallantry Cross with Palm

Commanders
- Current commander: Lt Col Andrew "Capone" Griffin
- Notable commanders: Pierce McKennon; Richard Myers; Robert R. Scott; Vermont Garrison

Insignia
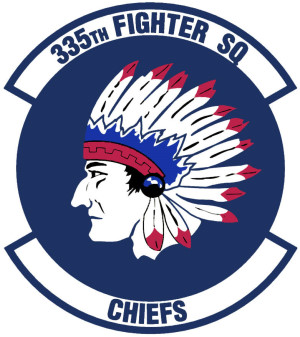
- 335th Fighter Squadron emblem (approved 17 November 1958

The 335th Fighter Squadron is a United States Air Force unit. It is assigned to the 4th Operations Group and stationed at Seymour Johnson Air Force Base, North Carolina.

The 335th was constituted on 22 August 1942 as an incorporation of the No. 121 (Eagle) Squadron of the Royal Air Force, formed on 14 May 1941 as the second of three Eagle Squadrons of the Royal Air Force. These squadrons were composed of American volunteers, recruited by the RAF as a result of the heavy loss of pilots during the Battle of Britain in 1940; the volunteers were ineligible to join the USAAF. In this capacity, the squadron operated Supermarine Spitfires and Hawker Hurricanes.

Its current emblem contains the head of an American Indian chief, which dates back to the original emblem of 121 Squadron RAF.

== Overview ==
The "Chiefs" fly the McDonnell-Douglas (now Boeing) F-15E Strike Eagle. The squadron has an authorized strength of 24 aircraft and around 65 personnel. Its aircraft are identified by the "SJ" tail code and green fin flash.

The squadron provides deployable aircraft and personnel capable of fighting worldwide.

The 335th is known as the "World's Leading MiG Killers" for destroying 218.5 MiGs in aerial combat.

== History ==
=== World War II ===
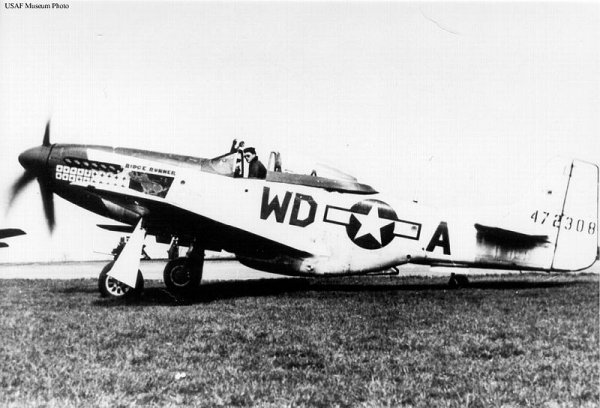
335th Fighter Squadron P-51D (Note: Aircraft is North American P-51D-20-NA Mustang serial 44-72308.)

In 1942, the Royal Air Force Eagle Squadrons were turned over to the United States Army Air Forces, with No. 121 Squadron being constituted as the 335th Fighter Squadron on 22 August, activated on 12 September and the same day assigned to the 4th Fighter Group of the VIII Fighter Command. Coming into USAAF service, the squadron was re-equipped with Republic P-47 Thunderbolts and later North American P-51 Mustangs. They destroyed 262 enemy aircraft – 165 in the air and 97 on the ground.

They remained with the group until they were returned to the United States and inactivated at Camp Kilmer, New Jersey on 10 November 1945.

=== 1940s ===
After less than a year, the 335th was reactivated on 9 September 1946 at Selfridge Field, Michigan, and has remained on active duty since. In 1947, the squadron was redesignated as the 335th Fighter Squadron, Jet Propelled, as it received the new Lockheed P-80 Shooting Stars.

They flew out of Andrews Air Force Base, Maryland, until 1949, when they moved to Langley Air Force Base, Virginia and received the North American F-86 Sabre.

=== 1950s ===
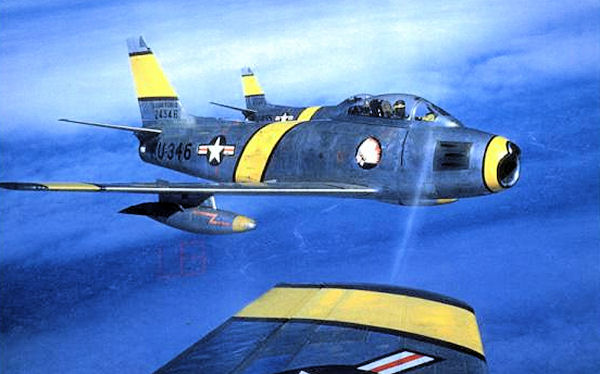
335th FIS F-86Fs over North Korea (Note: Aircraft are North American F-86F-25-NH Sabres. Aircraft with serial 52-5346 is identifiable.)

On 10 November 1950 they took their Sabres to Korea as the 335th Fighter-Interceptor Squadron of the Fifth Air Force. By the end of the Korean War, the 335th led all squadrons with 218.5 kills (for around forty losses) and had become a part of the "MiG Killer" legend with 12 aces.

The 335th remained in the Far East until 8 December 1957, when they moved to their current base at Seymour Johnson Air Force Base, North Carolina, and converted to the North American F-100 Super Sabre.

In May 1958, the squadron deployed to Eglin Air Force Base, Florida, tasked with operational testing of the new Republic F-105 Thunderchief for the next three years. In May 1959, the 335th became the first squadron in the Air Force to receive the F-105 Thunderchief, and the transition from F-100s to F-105s began. The squadron returned to Seymour Johnson AFB in November 1961.

=== 1960s ===
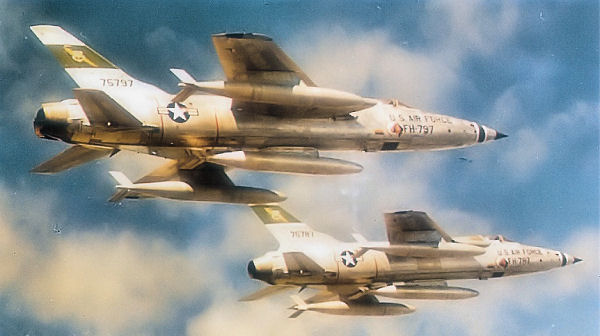
Two 335th Tactical Fighter Squadron F-105B Thunderchiefs (Note: Aircraft are Republic F-105B-15-RE Thunderchiefs serials 57-5797 and 57-5787.)

The squadron saw action in Southeast Asia in November 1965, flying the F-105 out of Takhli Royal Thai Air Force Base, Thailand. In 1969, the 335th transitioned to the airframe its aircrew would fly for the next twenty-three years—the McDonnell F-4 Phantom II; later this year, they briefly deployed to South Korea.

=== 1970s ===
In 1972, the squadron again saw action in Vietnam, from July to December, flying out of Ubon Royal Thai Air Force Base, Thailand.

Later in the 1970s, they became the first operational squadron to qualify with the GBU-15 guided bomb, and in doing so, exceeded 100,000 consecutive accident-free hours. They deployed briefly to Ramstein Air Base, Germany in 1978 and 1979, for a month each time.

=== 1990s ===
On 1 March 1990, in conjunction with the fifty-first change of command, the squadron's final F-4 sortie and first McDonnell Douglas F-15E Strike Eagle sortie were flown. The 335th was the second fighter squadron in the Air Force to receive the Strike Eagle.

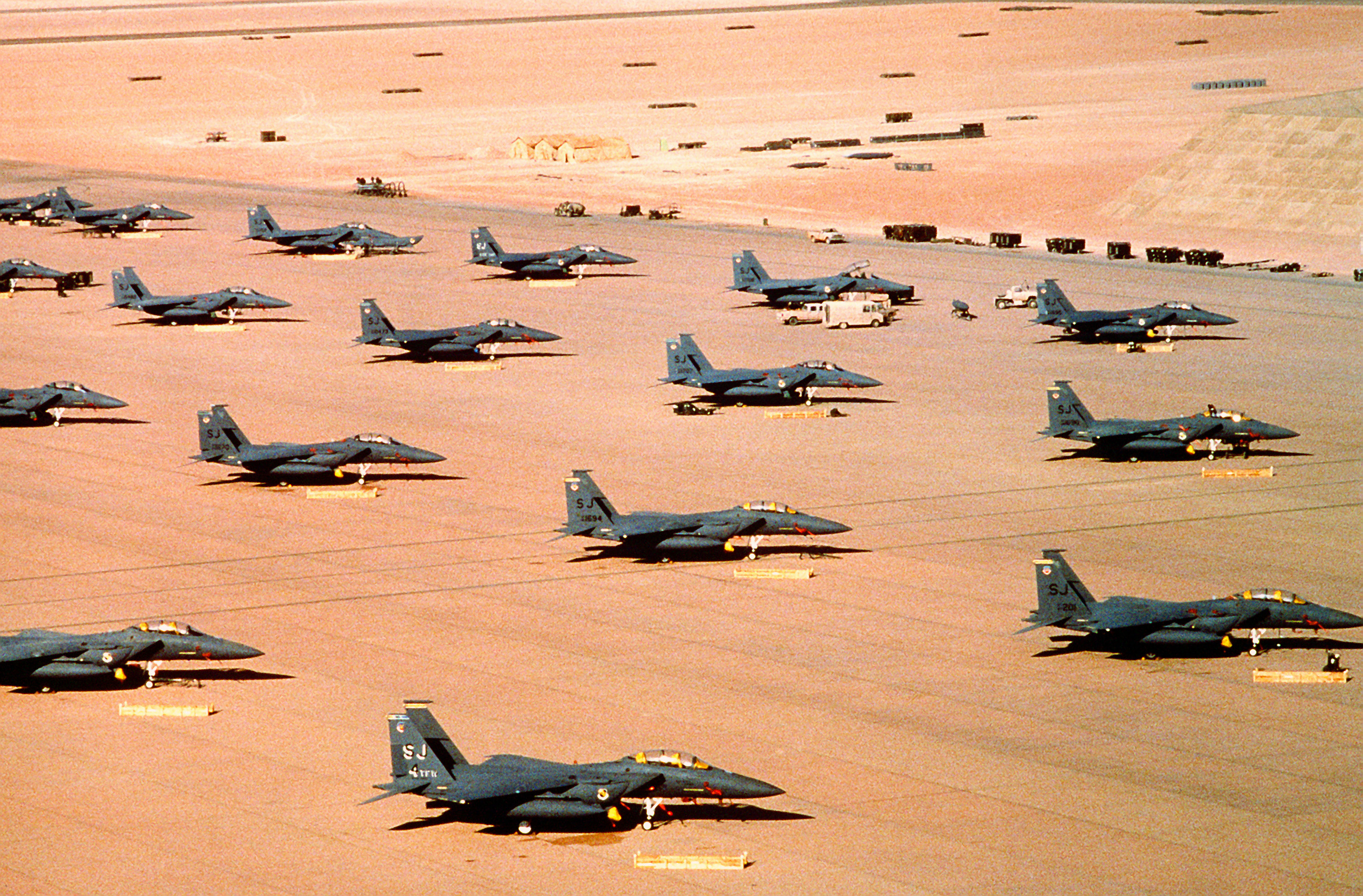
F-15Es from the 4th FW parked during Operation Desert Shield.

On 27 December 1990, the 335th deployed twenty-four F-15Es along with support personnel and equipment to Al Kharj Air Base in central Saudi Arabia. On the night of 16 January 1991, the 335th participated in the initial assault on Iraq, hitting communications, power networks, and airfields around Baghdad. The 335th made aerial warfare history by downing an Iraqi helicopter in the air using a laser-guided bomb. During the war, the squadron flew 1,097 combat missions over Iraq and occupied Kuwait, dropping over 4.8 million pounds of ordnance.

After the war, the 335th continued to fly combat air patrol missions over Iraq and Kuwait until relieved by the 334th Fighter Squadron, departing on 24 June 1991. Since then, the 335th has returned to Southwest Asia several times; three times to Dhahran, Saudi Arabia, and twice to Doha, Qatar, as an Air Expeditionary Force. On 13 January 1993, the ten F-15Es from the 335th took part in a night strike on Air Defence targets inside Southern Iraq as part of Operation Southern Watch. The AEF-III deployment in 1996 was the first for an Air Force unit to Doha after the Desert Storm deployment of the 614th Tactical Fighter Squadron's F-16's during 1990–1991.

=== 2000s ===
In January 2002, the 335th deployed to Al Jaber Air Base, Kuwait in support of Southern Watch and Operation Enduring Freedom. 12 F-15Es deployed, accomplishing 500 sorties comprising 3,000 flying hours. During this time the 335th dropped almost 300 laser guided and dumb bombs, and expended 1200 rounds of 20mm ammunition. The 335th received numerous awards and accolades from Operation Enduring Freedom; four Silver Stars were awarded as well as eight Distinguished Flying Crosses.

In February 2003 the 335th again deployed to Southwest Asia for Operation Iraqi Freedom. During Iraqi Freedom and Operation Southern Watch the squadron deployed 24 F-15Es, and flew 1,500 sorties, totaling 7,000 flying hours. They dropped over one million pounds of precision and non-precision munitions on numerous targets such as key Iraqi leadership, command and control bunkers, artillery Republican Guard units and many others.

F-15E serial number 89-0487, known as "America's Aircraft", has the most hours of any F-15 model (C, D, E), and it has one air to air kill (the only air-to-air kill by F-15Es).

Throughout the 2000s, 2010s and 2020s the 335th conducted multiple deployments including combat deployments to the Middle East.

=== 2020s ===
In early April 2024, the 335th's F-15Es were urgently deployed to the CENTCOM AOR to bolster US military presence in the region due to possible Iranian military action against US military personnel and Israel tied to the Israel-Hamas War.

On April 13-14, 2024, 335th F-15Es assisted in the defense of Israel against an onslaught of drones and surface to air missiles launched from Iran. The 335th's F-15Es, operating with F-15Es from the 494th FS, were credited with over +70 kills of Iranian drones during combat air patrols.

Following the April 13-14 operation, the President of the United States called the Commanding Officers of both the 335th FS and 494th FS. The President commended the F-15E squadrons for their excellent airmanship and piloting skills in defense of Israel and US military personnel in the AOR.

== Lineage ==
- Constituted as the 335th Fighter Squadron on 22 August 1942

Activated on 12 September 1942
Redesignated 335th Fighter Squadron, Single Engine on 20 August 1943
Inactivated on 10 November 1945

- Activated on 9 September 1946

Redesignated 335th Fighter Squadron, Jet Propelled on 23 April 1947
Redesignated 335th Fighter Squadron, Jet on 14 June 1948
Redesignated 335th Fighter-Interceptor Squadron on 20 January 1950
Redesignated 335th Fighter-Bomber Squadron on 8 March 1955
Redesignated 335th Fighter-Day Squadron on 25 April 1956
Redesignated 335th Tactical Fighter Squadron on 1 July 1958
Redesignated 335th Fighter Squadron on 1 November 1991

=== Assignments ===
- 4th Fighter Group, 12 September 1942 – 10 November 1945
- 4th Fighter Group (later 4th Fighter-Interceptor Group, 4th Fighter-Bomber Group, 4th Fighter-Day Group), 9 September 1946
- 4th Fighter-Day Wing (later 4th Tactical Fighter Wing), 8 December 1957

Attached to Tactical Air Command 1 May 1960 – 22 November 1961, Seventeenth Air Force c. 16 November 1964 – 21 February 1965, 6441 Tactical Fighter Wing 3 July–c. 6 November 1965, 355th Tactical Fighter Wing c. 6 November–6 December 1965, 354th Tactical Fighter Wing 4 December 1969 – c. 25 May 1970, 8th Tactical Fighter Wing 6 July–, 22 December 1972, 86th Tactical Fighter Wing 2 September–2 October 1978 and 28 August–29 September 1979, 4th Tactical Fighter Wing, Provisional, 27 December 1990 – 12 March 1991, 4404th Tactical Fighter Wing, Provisional after 13 March 1991)

- 4th Operations Group, 22 April 1991 – present (remained attached to 4404th Tactical Fighter Wing, Provisional until 27 June 1991)

=== Stations ===
- RAF Bushey Hall (AAF-341), England, 12 September 1942
- RAF Debden (AAF-356), England, 29 September 1942
- RAF Steeple Morden (AAF-122), England, c. 23 July–4 November 1945
- Camp Kilmer, New Jersey, 9–10 November 1945
- Selfridge Field, Michigan, 9 September 1946
- Andrews Field (later Andrews Air Force Base), Maryland, 26 March 1947
- Langley Air Force Base, Virginia, 1 May 1949
- Dover Air Force Base, Delaware, 13 August–11 November 1950
- Johnson Air Base, Japan, 13 December 1950
- Suwon Air Base (K-13), South Korea, 1 May 1951
- Kimpo Air Base (K-14), South Korea, 24 August 1951
- Johnson Air Base, Japan, 20 September 1951
- Kimpo Air Base (K-14), South Korea, 4 November 1951
- Chitose Air Base, Japan, c. 26 November 1954 – 8 December 1957
- Seymour Johnson Air Force Base, North Carolina, 8 December 1957 – present

Operated from

Eglin Air Force Base, Florida, 1 May 1960 – 22 November 1961
McCoy Air Force Base, Florida, 21 October–29 November 1962
Incirlik Air Base, Turkey, 16 November 1964 – 21 February 1965
Yokota Air Base, Japan, 3 July–c. 6 November 1965
Takhli Royal Thai Air Force Base, Thailand, c. 6 November–c. 8 December 1965
Kunsan Air Base, South Korea, 24 December 1967 – c. 25 June 1968
Ubon Royal Thai Air Force Base, Thailand, 6 July–22 December 1972
Ramstein Air Base, Germany, 2 September–2 October 1978 and 28 August–29 September 1979
Al Karj Air Base, Saudi Arabia, 27 December 1990 – 24 June 1991

=== Aircraft ===
- Supermarine Spitfire, 1942–1943
- Republic P-47 Thunderbolt, 1943–1944; 1947
- North American P-51 (later F-51) Mustang, 1944–1945, 1948–1949
- Lockheed P-80 Shooting Star, 1947–1949
- North American F-86 Sabre, 1949–1958
- North American F-100 Super Sabre, 1958–1960
- Republic F-105 Thunderchief, 1959–1966
- McDonnell F-4 Phantom II, 1967–1989
- McDonnell Douglas F-15E Strike Eagle, 1990–present

=== Emblems ===
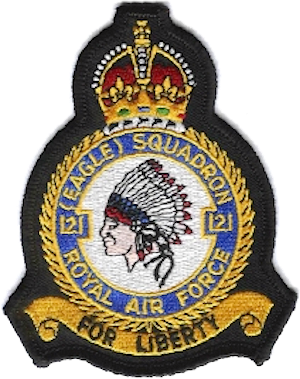
121 Eagle Squadron, RAF, 1940

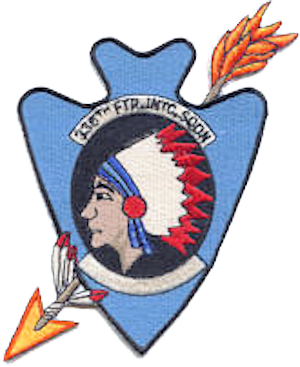
335th Fighter Squadron Korea

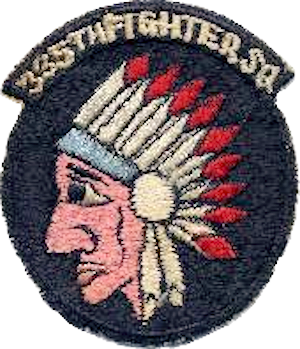
USAF 335th Fighter-Interceptor Squadron (ADC)
