= Mervyn Ingram =

New Zealand flying ace (1921–1944)

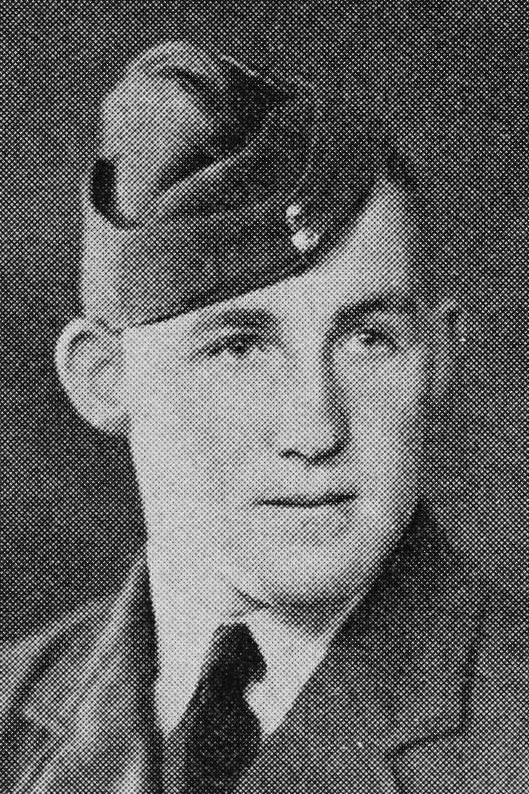
- Born: 13 December 1921; Dunedin, New Zealand
- Died: 11 July 1944 (aged 22); Imphal, India
- Military career
- Allegiance: New Zealand
- Branch: Royal New Zealand Air Force (1940–1944)
- Rank: Squadron leader
- Commands: No. 152 Squadron
- Conflicts: Second World War; Channel Front; Siege of Malta; Western Desert campaign; Invasion of Sicily; Italian campaign; Burma campaign
- Awards: Distinguished Flying Cross

Mervyn Robert Bruce Ingram, DFC (13 December 1921 – 11 July 1944) was a New Zealand flying ace of the Royal New Zealand Air Force (RNZAF) during the Second World War. He is credited with at least eight aerial victories.

Born in Dunedin, Ingram joined the RNZAF in 1940. After completing his flight training, the latter part of which was received in the United Kingdom, he was posted to the Royal Air Force's No. 66 Squadron in June 1941 and then onto No. 611 Squadron. He was an original member of No. 486 Squadron when it was formed in March 1942. A month later he was dispatched to the Mediterranean theatre to fly with No. 601 Squadron as part of Malta's aerial defences. During his period of service on Malta he claimed his first aerial victories. The squadron later shifted to Egypt and he participated in the Western Desert campaign until the end of 1942. After a period of duty as an instructor, he returned to operations with No. 232 Squadron in June 1943 before being given command of No. 152 Squadron, equipped with Supermarine Spitfires and operating over Sicily. He took his command to India in November 1943, and it soon began participating in flight operations over India and Burma. He died several days after crashing his aircraft on landing at Imphal, having contracted malaria and tetanus while in hospital.

== Early life ==
Mervyn Robert Bruce Ingram was born on 13 December 1921 in Dunedin, New Zealand. His father, C. Ingram, was the chief of the local fire station. Ingram was educated at Dunedin North Intermediate School and then went onto Otago Boys' High School. He was active in sports, playing rugby union and represented the Otago Province at junior level in 1939. He was also a competitive swimmer, winning a number of age-group titles in the sport. After completing his schooling, he worked as a clerk for the local branch of Shell Oil.

== Second World War ==
Following the outbreak of the Second World War, Ingram applied to join the Royal New Zealand Air Force (RNZAF). He was called up in July 1940, proceeding to the RNZAF station at Levin as an airman pilot for his initial training before going on to No. 1 Elementary Flying Training School. He made his first solo flight on 12 September and the following month went to No. 1 Flying Training School at Wigram. He earned his pilot's badge on 16 January 1941, less than a week after he had to make a forced landing due to engine failure. Promoted to sergeant in early February, at the end of that month he was sent to the United Kingdom on attachment to the Royal Air Force (RAF).

=== Channel Front ===
After a period of time at No. 53 Operational Training Unit (OTU), learning to fly the Supermarine Spitfire fighter, in June 1941 he was posted to No. 66 Squadron, with which he flew 23 sorties. The following month he was transferred to No. 611 Squadron. He was credited with damaging a Messerschmitt Bf 109 fighter on 20 September. Commissioned a pilot officer in November, he flew over 80 sorties with the squadron before being posted to No. 486 Squadron in March 1942. His new unit was a newly formed fighter squadron based at Kirton-in-Lindsey, equipped with Hawker Hurricanes, and staffed mainly with RNZAF flying personnel; Ingram was one of the more experienced pilots. However, he was not there long as he was selected as a reinforcement pilot for Malta and joined No. 601 Squadron.

=== Service with No. 601 Squadron ===
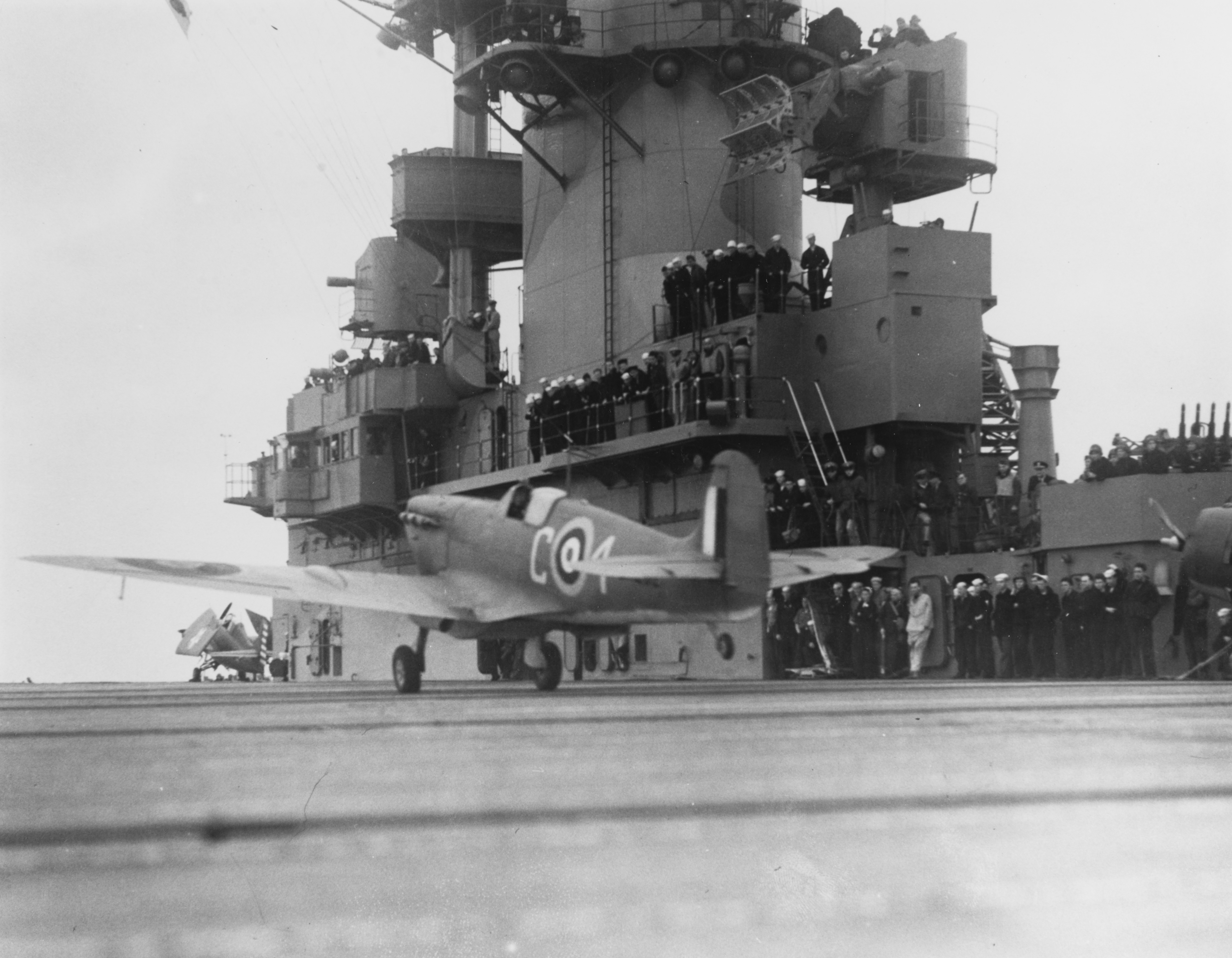
A Spitfire, bound for Malta, taking off from the flight deck of the USS Wasp

The island of Malta, in the Mediterranean Sea, was under sustained attack by the Luftwaffe and Regia Aeronautica and its aerial defenders were hard pressed. Nos. 601 and 603 Squadrons, equipped with Spitfire Vcs, were selected as reinforcements to be transported to the island in a mission that was to be designated as Operation Calendar. Due to non-availability of a suitable British aircraft carrier, they sailed aboard the United States aircraft carrier USS Wasp, embarking on 14 April 1942 from Glasgow. Passing through the Strait of Gibraltar on 19 April, Ingram and the other pilots flew their Spitfires off the deck of the Wasp the following day. He and the rest of No. 601 Squadron safely landed at Luqa.

Ingram was soon in action and by 14 May was credited with his first aerial victory, a half share in a destroyed Junkers Ju 88 medium bomber, which was part of a raid targeting the Ta Kali airfield. On 15 June, with another pilot, he was credited with a half share in a Junkers Ju 87 dive bomber of the Regia Aeronautica that was attacking a supply convoy destined for Malta. On a subsequent sortie the same day, he destroyed a Ju 88 that was targeting the same convoy.

Later in the month, No. 601 Squadron moved to Egypt and began operations in support of the campaign in the Western Desert. On 14 July, he was one of three pilots that combined to destroy a Bf 109 and a week later had the sole credit for destroying another of the same type. He destroyed a Ju 88 near El Alamein on 24 July and repeated his success the next day. In the course of completing an air test on 9 August he crashed his aircraft. Injured in the crash, he was hospitalised for several days and did not return to the squadron until 1 September. Quickly back on operations, and by this time a flight lieutenant, he was credited with the probable destruction of a Bf 109 the next day, damaged a second Bf 109 on 4 September, and shot down a third on 7 September, all in the area around El Alamein. Another Bf 109 was claimed as probably destroyed on 18 September. He was subsequently awarded the Distinguished Flying Cross, the announcement being made in The London Gazette on 6 October 1942.

On 19 October, Ingram claimed a Bf 109 as probably destroyed. Another was damaged a week later, following the commencement of the Second Battle of El Alamein. At the end of the month, he was one of six pilots who engaged and destroyed a Junkers Ju 52 transport over Mersa Matruh. The following week while flying to the west of Mersa Matruh he shot down a Bf 109 and had a half share in a Ju 87 destroyed. His final aerial victory while flying with No. 601 Squadron was on 8 December, when he shot down a Bf 109. Shortly afterwards, he was rested from operations, having flown over 130 sorties with the squadron.

Posted to No. 244 Wing Base Training Pool where he remained until February 1943, Ingram then performed instructing duties at the No. 1 Middle East Training School. In March he proceeded onto No. 73 OTU, again as an instructor. In late June, he was posted to No. 232 Squadron, at the time based in Malta and operating along the coast of Sicily in preparation for the Allied invasion of the island. He had a brief stay with the unit after flying only 14 sorties, he was transferred again, this time to No. 243 Squadron, also based in Malta, in July. The squadron's role was primarily to escort heavy bombers to targets in Sicily and Italy. His time with the squadron was also relatively brief, flying only 30 operations. On one of these, escorting Kittyhawk P-40 fighter bombers on 3 August, Ingram engaged a Bf 109 near Mount Etna and claimed it as damaged.

=== Squadron commander ===
On 10 August 1943, Ingram, having been promoted to acting squadron leader, was appointed commander of No. 152 Squadron, yet another unit based in Malta and which was flying patrols over the Sicilian invasion beaches. Once the Allied invasion of Italy began, the squadron carried out similar patrolling duties. On 18 September, near Salerno, he damaged a Focke-Wulf Fw 190 fighter and the next day was credited with the destruction of another aircraft of the same type in the same area. A few days later, he had a half share in a destroyed Fw 190. By October, the pace of the squadron's operations over Italy had declined and the next month it was transferred to India.

Becoming operational in December, the squadron initially performed defensive patrols over Calcutta and then started flying to central Burma. From March 1944 it began flying to Imphal, carrying out low level operations against the Japanese and escorting bombers and transport aircraft. On 21 June, returning to Imphal after an attack on Japanese supply lines, Ingram crashed his Spitfire while landing. Due to a broken nose, he was hospitalised. During his recovery period, he contracted malaria and tetanus. Despite nurses being flown to Imphal with medication to help in his treatment, Ingram died on 11 July 1944. He is buried at the Imphal War Cemetery in India. The DFC that Ingram had been awarded in 1942 was formally presented to his parents on 27 February 1948 by New Zealand's Governor-General, Bernard Freyberg, in a private ceremony for families of military personnel who had died while on active service.

At the time of his death, Ingram was credited with having shot down eight enemy aircraft, with shares in another six aircraft destroyed. He is also credited with three probably destroyed and five damaged.
