= April 1915 =

Month of 1915

<<	April 1915					>>
Su	Mo	Tu	We	Th	Fr	Sa
				1	2	3
4	5	6	7	8	9	10
11	12	13	14	15	16	17
18	19	20	21	22	23	24
25	26	27	28	29	30

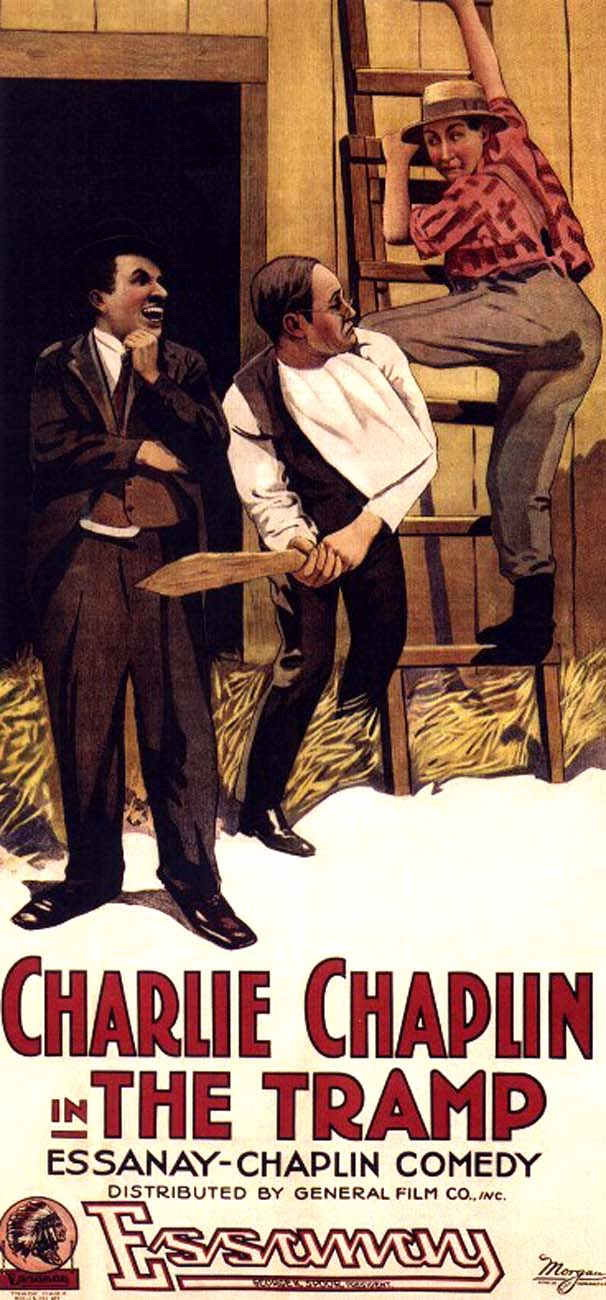
Movie poster of The Tramp

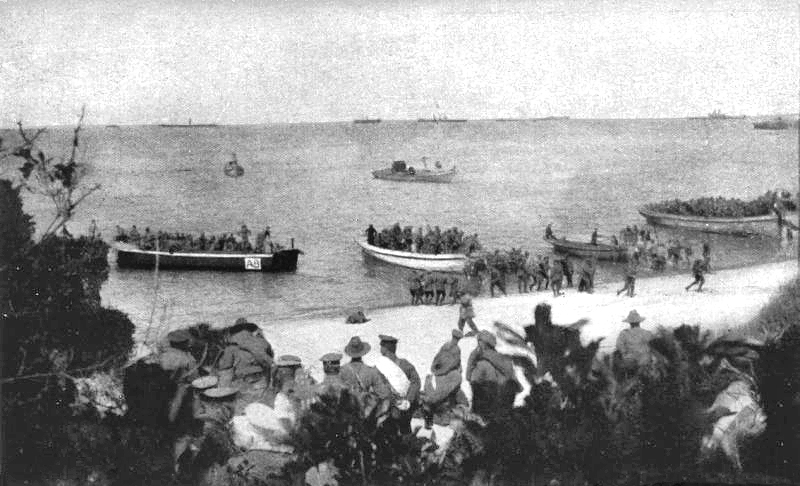
Australian troops landing at Anzac Cove, 25 April 1915.

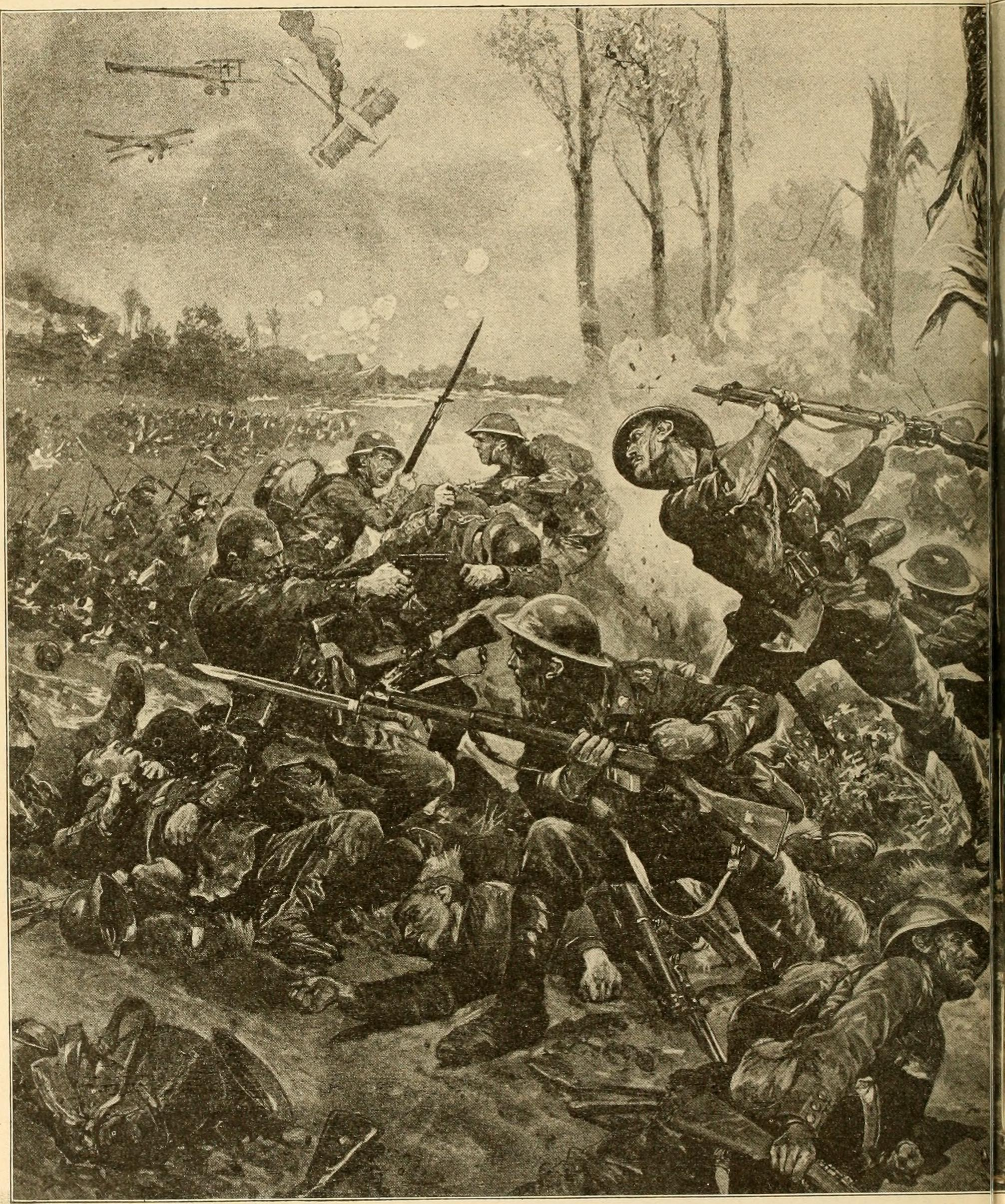
Canadian and German soldiers clash at Kitcheners' Wood during the Second Battle of Ypres.

The following events occurred in April 1915:

== April 1, 1915 (Thursday) ==
French war ace Jean Navarre.

- In a Morane-Saulnier airplane, French fighter pilot Jean Navarre and his observer/gunner Jean Robert attacked a German Aviatik over Merval, France. Robert used a carbine to damage the enemy plane and wound the pilot, forcing him to land behind French lines and surrender. It is Navarre's first victory and would set him on course to becoming a flying ace.
- French fighter pilot Lieutenant Roland Garros scored the first kill achieved by firing a machine gun through a tractor propeller of an enemy observation plane. Garros would score two more victories in this way later in the month.
- Baldwin Locomotive Works delivered the first of 280 Péchot-Bourdon locomotives for the French trench railways on the Western Front.
- The 29th, 30th, 31st, 32nd, 34th, 35th, 37th, and 39th Infantry Divisions of the British Army were established.
- The 123rd Infantry Division of the Imperial German Army was established as part of a new wave of German infantry divisions formed in the spring of 1915.
- The Australian Flying Corps established a squadron to provide aerial support for ground troops in the Mesopotamian campaign.
- The New Zealand Army Ordnance Section of the New Zealand Army was established.
- The Kokura Railway extended the Hitahikosan Line in the Fukuoka Prefecture, Japan, with stations Ishida serving the line. As well, the Tojo Railway extended the Tōbu Tōjō Line in the Saitama Prefecture with stations Kawagoe serving the line.
- The Majestic Theater opened in Detroit. Designed by architect C. Howard Crane, it was listed on the National Register of Historic Places in 2008.
- The Museum of Oltenia was established in Craiova, Romania.
- Born:
  - R. B. Freeman, British biologist and historian, known for compiling complete manuscript records of Charles Darwin and Philip Henry Gosse; as Richard Broke Freeman, in London, England (d. 1986)
  - Walter Fricke, German mathematician and astronomer, director of the Astronomical Calculation Institute from 1954 to 1985, recipient of the Order of Merit of the Federal Republic of Germany; in Leimbach-Mansfeld, German Empire (present-day Germany)) (d. 1988)
  - Arthur C. Lundahl, American intelligence officer, chief organizer of the imagery intelligence that detected missiles being built in Cuba in 1962; in Chicago, United States (d. 1992)
  - Jeff Heath, Canadian-born American baseball player, left fielder for the Cleveland Indians, St. Louis Browns and Boston Braves from 1936 to 1949; as John Geoffrey Heath, in Fort William, Ontario, Canada (d. 1975)

== April 2, 1915 (Friday) ==
- Close to 2,500 Australian and New Zealand soldiers rioted while on leave in Cairo, resulting in property damage and burned businesses costing several hundred thousand pounds.
- The 115th and 117th Infantry Divisions of the Imperial German Army were established.
- A football match between Manchester United and Liverpool at Old Trafford, Manchester was fixed to favor a 2–0 victory for United, with players on both teams involved in rigging the game.
- The French Parliament adopted the bill to create the military decoration Croix de guerre for combatants who displayed exceptional service during World War I.
- Born: Soia Mentschikoff, Russian American lawyer, first woman to teach at Harvard Law School; in Moscow, Russian Empire (present-day Russia) (d. 1984)

== April 3, 1915 (Saturday) ==
- French fighter pilot Adolphe Pégoud scored his fifth aerial victory, becoming the first flying ace.
- Ottoman cruiser Mecidiye struck a mine and sank in the Gulf of Odessa. She was later salvaged by the Russians and entered service with the Imperial Russian Navy as Prut.
- The Don Bosco Preparatory High School was established by the Catholic institute Salesians of Don Bosco in Ramsey, New Jersey.
- The first edition of the newspaper Antelope Valley Press was published in Antelope Valley, California as the Palmdale Post.
- Born:
  - Axel Axgil, Danish gay rights activist, co-founder of Forbundet af 1948 (The Association of 1948), Denmark's first gay rights organization, now the Danish National Association of Gays and Lesbians; as Axel Lundahl-Madsen (d. 2011)
  - İhsan Doğramacı, Turkish physician and academic, first chairman and president of the Board of Trustees for the World Health Organization; in Abril, Ottoman Syria (present-day Iraq) (d. 2010)
  - Piet de Jong, Dutch politician, 43rd Prime Minister of the Netherlands; as Petrus Jozef Sietse de Jong, in Apeldoorn, Netherlands (d. 2016)
- Died:
  - Nadežda Petrović, 41, Serbian painter, noted female painter with the Fauvism movement; died of typhoid fever (b. 1873)
  - Mary Garrett, 61, American philanthropist, endowed the Johns Hopkins School of Medicine while ensuring women had equal access to its study programs; died of leukemia (b. 1854)

== April 4, 1915 (Sunday) ==
- The 7th Army for France was established to defend the southern borders of the country.
- Using the statue of Charles Stewart Parnell on Sackville Street as a symbolic political statement, Irish Member of Parliament John Redmond saluted 25,000 National Volunteers assembled at the Phoenix Park, Dublin.
- The first services were held in St. Andrew's Episcopal Church in Birmingham, Alabama. The church would be listed in the National Register of Historic Places in 1986.

== April 5, 1915 (Monday) ==
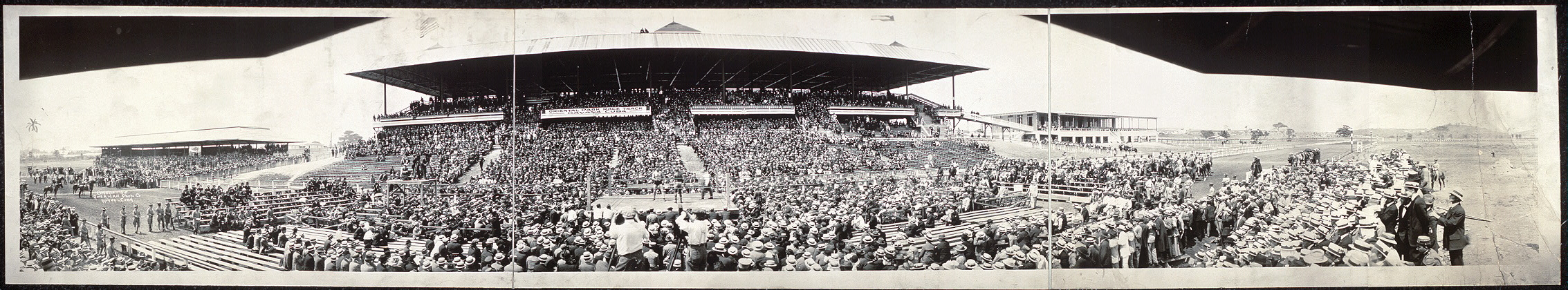
Panorama of title fight between Jack Johnson and Jess Willard in Havana.

- Boxer Jess Willard, the latest "Great White Hope", defeated Jack Johnson with a 26th-round knockout in sweltering heat at Havana. Willard became very popular among white Americans for "bringing back the championship to the white race".
- The Daily Mail published Teddy Tail, the first daily cartoon strip in a British newspaper.
- Born:
  - John McLendon, American basketball coach, head of various basketball teams starting with the North Carolina Central Eagles men's basketball team in 1941 to the Cleveland State Vikings men's basketball team in 1969, first African American to coach a professional sports team with the Denver Rockets in 1969; in Hiawatha, Kansas, United States (d. 1999)
  - Johnny Sylvester, American business executive, best known for being the sick boy baseball star Babe Ruth promised to hit a home run for during the 1926 World Series which resulted in a miraculous recovery; as John Dale Sylvester, in Caldwell, New Jersey, United States (d. 1990)

== April 6, 1915 (Tuesday) ==
- Battle of Celaya — A Constitutional Army of 15,000 cavalry and infantry under command of Álvaro Obregón repelled Pancho Villa's assault of 22,000 men on the city of Celaya in Guanajuato, Mexico. It was the first of several battles between the two leaders that would eventually lead to Villa losing his position as a national contender in Mexico.
- Battle of Hartmannswillerkopf — The French tried and failed to take German defense positions on the lower slopes of the Hartmannswillerkopf, thus slowing their advance into in the Alsace region between France and Germany.
- British publisher Charles Elkin Mathews released American poet Ezra Pound's poetry collection Cathay.
- The borough Woodbury Heights, New Jersey was incorporated.

== April 7, 1915 (Wednesday) ==
- Perry Engineering acquired James Martin & Co and its foundry in Gawler, South Australia, Australia.
- The Burke Hospital opened to accept patients in White Plains, New York.
- Born: Billie Holiday, American jazz singer, creator of many hit songs including "God Bless the Child", author of the autobiography Lady Sings the Blues; as Eleanora Fagan, in Philadelphia, United States (d. 1959)

== April 8, 1915 (Thursday) ==
- Born: Kirby Higbe, American baseball player for the Brooklyn Dodgers, in Columbia, South Carolina, United States (d.1985)
- Died: Louis Pergaud, 33, French writer, author of War of the Buttons; killed from friendly fire by French artillery barrage (b. 1882)

== April 9, 1915 (Friday) ==
- Born:
  - Daniel Johnson Sr., Canadian politician, 20th Premier of Quebec; as Francis Daniel Johnson, in Danville, Quebec, Canada (d. 1968)
  - Leonard Wibberley, Irish-American author, best known for his "Mouse" series of novels including The Mouse That Roared; in County Dublin, Ireland (d. 1983)
  - Bob Quinn, Australian association football player, champion player for the Port Adelaide Football Club from 1933 to 1947; as Robert Quinn, in Birkenhead, South Australia, Australia (d. 2008)
  - Bill Clement, Welsh rugby player, played for Llanelli and captained six times for the Wales national rugby union team; as William Clement, in Llanelli, Wales (d. 2007)
- Died:
  - Friedrich Loeffler, 62, German microbiologist, discovered the bacteria that causes diphtheria (b. 1852)
  - James Moorhouse, 88, Australian clergy, Anglican Bishop of Melbourne and of Manchester, and Chancellor of the University of Melbourne (b. 1826)
  - Léopold Louis-Dreyfus, 82, French business leader, founder of the Louis Dreyfus Company (b. 1833)

== April 10, 1915 (Saturday) ==
- The Knights of Saint Columbanus was established in Belfast to provide charitable service to Irish citizens, expanding to 38 councils throughout Ireland.
- The film magazine Picture Play published its first edition.
- The last edition of the weekly newspaper Boston Courier was published, after being a mainstay in Boston since 1824.
- Born:
  - Muhammad Ibrahim Khan, Pakistani state leader, first President of Azad Jammu and Kashmir; in Poonch district, British India (present-day Pakistan) (d. 2003)
  - Harry Morgan, American actor, best known for his leading roles as Officer Bill Gannon in the 1967 TV revival of Dragnet and Colonel Sherman T. Potter in M*A*S*H; as Harry Bratsberg, in Detroit, United States (d. 2011)

== April 11, 1915 (Sunday) ==
- Charlie Chaplin's film The Tramp was released. Although Chaplin had portrayed the character in earlier films, it was the first film that nailed down the character's trademarks, by placing less on slapstick and more on story, such as the Tramp's willingness to be kind and help others. It was also the fifth and final film Chaplin made with Essanay Studios.

== April 12, 1915 (Monday) ==
- British, Australian and New Zealand forces assembled on the Greek island of Lemnos and conducted practice landings in preparation for the Gallipoli campaign.
- Battle of Shaiba — Ottoman commander Süleyman Askerî organized 4,000 regular Ottoman troops and 14,000 irregular Arab and Kurd fighters to retake the city of Basra back from a British force of 6,000 men in what is now southern Iraq.
- The Vienna Socialist Conference was held in the Austrian city for representatives from socialist parties in Germany, Austria and Hungary, the only such conference ever held within the Central Powers.
- The North Coast line was extended in New South Wales, Australia, with stations Kendal and Wauchope opened to serve the line.
- The association football club Campinense was formed in Campina Grande, Paraíba, Brazil.
- Stage actress Pauline Frederick made her film debut in The Eternal City, first released in Great Britain in April and later released in the United States on December 15.
- Born: Emil Petaja, American science fiction writer, first Author Emeritus of the Science Fiction and Fantasy Writers of America, author of Stardrift and Other Fantastic Flotsam; in Milltown, Montana, United States (d. 2000)

== April 13, 1915 (Tuesday) ==
- Battle of Shaiba — British soldiers under command of General Charles Melliss repelled a night attack by Ottoman forces and routed many of the Arab irregulars the following day, thereby reducing the attacking force to a fourth of its size.
- Battle of Celaya — Pancho Villa attempted a second assault on Celaya, Mexico to oust the Constitutional Army under command of Álvaro Obregón. Villa nearly succeeded in taking the city by the second day until a well-timed shipment of ammunition by train re-mobilized the city's defenders to drive off the attack.
- Ed Overholser became the 16th mayor of Oklahoma City.
- The Kearny Scots won their first American Cup, beating the Brooklyn Celtic 1–0 before a crowd of 5,000 spectators at Bartell's Park in Newark, New Jersey.
- A replica of the Thomas Jefferson statue by sculptor Karl Bitter was unveiled at the University of Virginia, days after he was struck and killed by a vehicle in New York City.
- Born: Bob Devaney, American football coach, head of the Wyoming Cowboys football team from 1957 to 1961, and the Nebraska Cornhuskers football team from 1962 to 1972, two-time NCAA champion; as Robert Devaney, in Saginaw, Michigan, United States (d. 1997)
- Died: William Rockhill Nelson, 74, American real estate developer and publisher, founder of The Kansas City Star newspaper (b. 1841)

== April 14, 1915 (Wednesday) ==
- Battle of Shaiba — British infantry cornered the remaining Ottoman force in a wood outside the Iraqi city of Basra, which surrendered after a full day of intense fighting. The Ottomans lost close to 2,500 casualties, including commander Süleyman Askerî who committed suicide, while the British sustained around 1,500 casualties. The British victory ensured Basra would remain under Allied control for the remainder of the war.
- German Navy Zeppelins bombed England a second time, resulting in two casualties.
- Defense of Van — An Armenian group known as Druzhina seized the lake side city of Van, Turkey from local government control, forcing local Ottoman troops to enter the city and contain the group.
- Ernest Shackleton, leader of the Imperial Trans-Antarctic Expedition, wrote in his log that the polar exploration ship Endurance was at risk of being "crushed like an eggshell" by the piling mass of ice that encased the ship for more than three months as it drifted north away from the Antarctic coast.
- The 9th Cavalry Brigade for the British Army was established.
- The newly opened Queen Mary's Military Hospital in Whalley, Lancashire, England began accepting injured servicemen. By the end of World War I, the military hospital treated over 56,000 patients. In 1921, it was transformed into a mental health facility known as Calderstones Hospital.
- The new clubhouse for the Sarasota Woman's Club opened in Sarasota, Florida on the club's second anniversary.
- The borough Magnolia, New Jersey was incorporated.

== April 15, 1915 (Thursday) ==
- Battle of Celaya — Pancho Villa retreated in defeat without taking the city Celaya in Mexico. He lost close to 9,000 men including 120 officers who were captured and executed. The resulting losses would put Villa on the defensive in future battles. In a telegram to Constitutionalist leader Venustiano Carranza, Constitutional Army commander Álvaro Obregón announced his victory with a sarcastic evaluation of the battle: “Fortunately, Villa led the attack personally”.
- Russia defeated Ottoman forces at the Battle of Dilman in what is now Salmas, Iran, with 3,500 Ottoman soldiers killed.
- Defense of Van — Governor Djevdet Bey of the Van Province in Turkey ordered local military forces to use violent means to suppress unrest among Armenian villages surrounding Van, Turkey following an uprising in the village of Erciş.
- The Royal Flying Corps grouped No. 8 Squadron and No. 13 Squadron of the Royal Air Force together at Fort Grange, Gosport, England to form the No. 5 Wing under command of Major Lionel Charlton, former commander of the No. 8 Squadron.
- A second consecutive German airship bombing mission occurred over England but little damage was inflicted.
- The international trade union Industrial Workers of the World held a conference in Kansas City, Missouri and established the Agricultural Workers Organization.
- A fire destroyed the Luna amusement park roller-coaster in Arlington, Virginia. With its main attraction gone and its finances already too precarious to rebuild, owner Frederick Ingersoll was forced to close and dismantle the amusement park.
- Musashino Railway opened the Musashino railroad in the Kantō region of Japan, with stations Higashi-Nagasaki, Nerima, Shakujii, Hōya, Higashi-Kurume, Kotesashi, Moto-Sayama, Toyooka-machi, Bushi, and Hannō serving the line.
- Born:
  - Elizabeth Catlett, American sculpture, best known for the African-American influenced work of wood, metal and marble, including the "Students Aspire" sculpture at Howard University; as Alice Elizabeth Catlett, in Washington, D.C., United States (d. 2012)
  - Walter Washington, American politician, first Mayor of the District of Columbia; in Dawson, Georgia, United States (d. 2003)
- Died: Urban A. Woodbury, 76, American politician, 45th Governor of Vermont (b. 1838)

== April 16, 1915 (Friday) ==
- Defense of Van — American physician and missionary Clarence Ussher met with Djevdet Bey, governor of Van Province in Turkey, following violent actions to quell unrest in the village of Shadakh near the city of Van (where Ussher had been stationed since 1899). Ussher had seen the effects of the Hamidian massacres in the region in the 1890s and was concerned another one was imminent. Although the meeting was cordial and the governor seemed to agree not to send Ottoman forces into the village, Ussher claimed in his memoir it was actually a ruse and soldiers were instead deployed to massacre Armenians in neighboring villages.
- British submarine HMS E15 ran aground at Kepez, Çanakkale, Turkey and was shelled by Ottoman forces while stranded, killing seven crew including the sub's commander. The surviving crew were captured and taken to Istanbul where six crew members died during imprisonment.
- British cargo ship SS Eglantine ran aground at Filey, Yorkshire, England. There was no loss of lives but the ship was a total loss.
- The United States Navy conducted the first aircraft catapult launch from a floating platform at Naval Air Station Pensacola in Pensacola, Florida.
- The silent film The Actor and the Rube, starring Riley Chamberlin and Boyd Marshall, was released to widely positive reviews for its lower key humor and less reliance on slapstick comedy.
- Died: Nelson W. Aldrich, 73, American politician, U.S. Senator from Rhode Island from 1881 to 1911 (b. 1841)

== April 17, 1915 (Saturday) ==
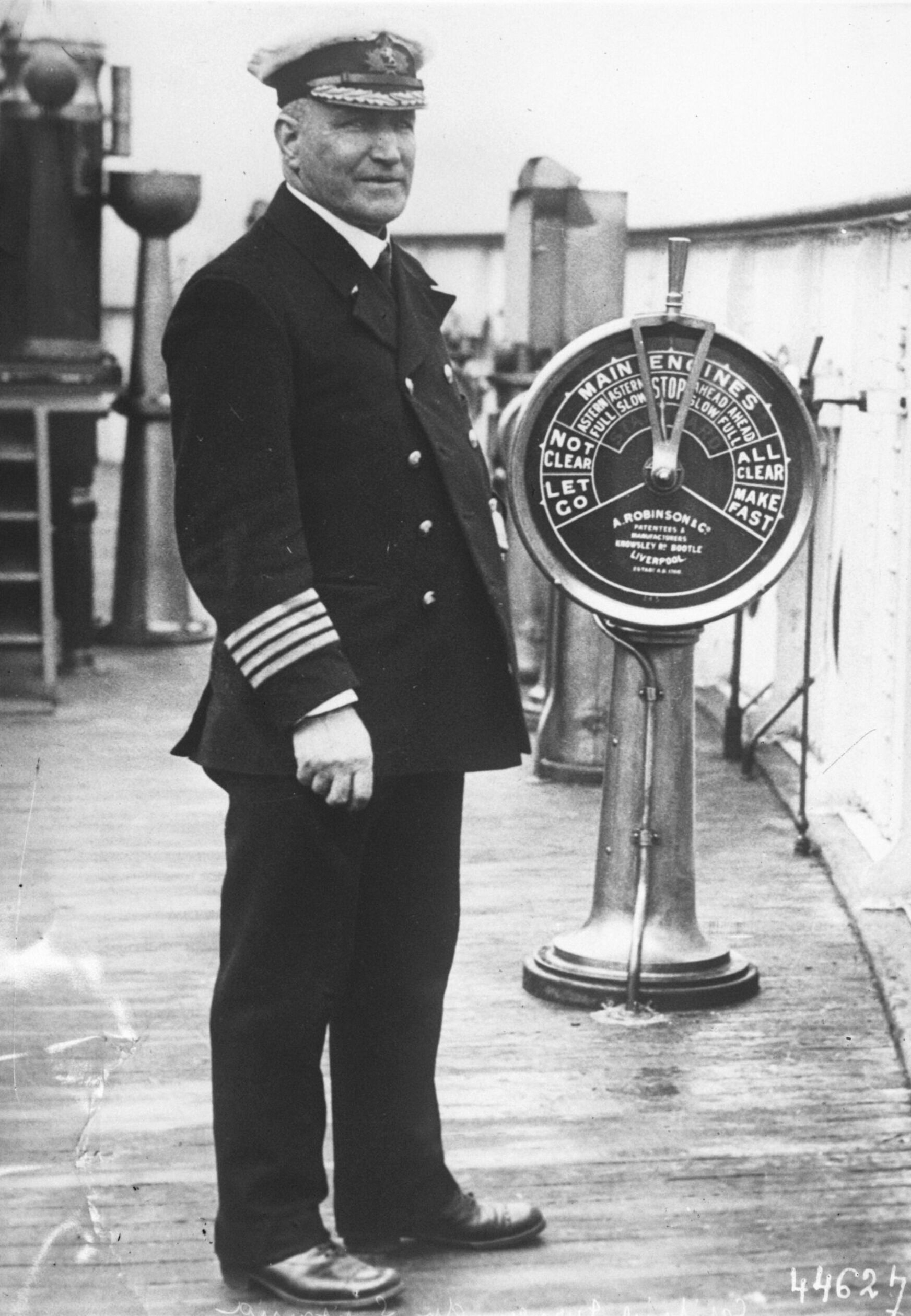
Captain William Thomas Turner, newly assigned to the ocean liner Lusitania.

- Battle of Hill 60 — British forces attempted to recapture the strategic hill on the Western Front from the Germans. British engineers from the 173rd Tunnelling Company dug excavations and filled them with explosives before detonating, killing and wounding many of the hill's German defenders. The 13th Brigade then moved in and overwhelmed the surviving defenders to capture the hill.
- British ocean liner RMS Lusitania departed from Liverpool on her 201st trans-Atlantic voyage, with recently appointed ship captain William Thomas Turner at the helm. Turner had replaced Captain Daniel Dow who had been exhibiting signs of stress and unusual judgement over the last weeks, likely due to news of Germany mounting unrestricted submarine warfare around Great Britain.
- Royal Naval Air Service airplanes attempted to destroy stranded British submarine HMS E15 in Turkey before it could fall into Ottoman hands but failed to hit their targets. Battleships Triumph and Majestic were ordered in to destroy the sub but intense fire from Ottoman shore batteries prevented them from getting near the abandoned sub.
- The first German prisoners of war arrived at Amherst Internment Camp, the largest POW camp in Canada during World War I, in Amherst, Nova Scotia.
- The South Wales Brigade of the British Army was disbanded.
- Born:
  - Joe Foss, American marine corps air officer and politician, commander of the VMFA-121 and VMFA-115 during World War II, 20th Governor of South Dakota, recipient for the Medal of Honor, Distinguished Flying Cross, and three Air Medals; as Joseph Jacob Foss, in Sioux Falls, South Dakota, United States (d. 2003)
  - Martin Clemens, Scottish colonial officer, organized the resistance to Japanese occupation on the Solomon Islands during World War II; as Warren Frederick Martin Clemens, in Aberdeen, Scotland (d. 2009)
  - Bertram James, British air force officer, commander of the No. 9 Squadron and member of the escape team from the German POW camp Stalag Luft III during World War II; in British India (present-day India) (d. 2008)

== April 18, 1915 (Sunday) ==
- Battle of Hill 60 — German forces attempted to retake the hill and actually held it for a few hours before the British 13th Brigade counterattacked in the early evening and retook all of the hill.
- The Royal Navy was finally able to scuttle British submarine HMS E15 that had run aground two days later when two picket boats from nearby battleships were able to navigate close to the abandoned sub despite being under fire by Ottoman shore batteries and torpedo the vessel. However, one the picket boats was hit and sunk, killing one crew member, while the rest were rescued by the sister boat.
- French fighter pilot Roland Garros was shot down and captured by the Germans.
- British fighter pilot Lanoe Hawker attacked German Zeppelin sheds at Gontrode, Belgium, destroying one and shooting down a nearby observation balloon. The attack forced the Germans to cease using Gontrode as an airship base. As a result, Hawker was awarded the Distinguished Service Order.
- The 30th Battalion was established to reinforce the Canadian Corps on the Western Front.
- Japanese National Railways extended the Rikuu East Line in the Miyagi Prefecture, Japan with station Narugo serving the line.
- The musical To-Night's the Night, by Paul Rubens with lyrics by Percy Greenbank, made its British premier at the Gaiety Theatre in London, running for a very successful 460 performances.
- German astronomer Max Wolf discovered asteroid 806 Gyldénia at the Heidelberg Observatory.
- Born:
  - Edmond Leburton, Belgian state leader, 42nd Prime Minister of Belgium; in Waremme, Belgium (d. 1997)
  - Joy Davidman, American poet, second wife to C. S. Lewis, author of Smoke on the Mountain: An Interpretation of the Ten Commandments; as Helen Joy Davidman, in New York City (d. 1960)

== April 19, 1915 (Monday) ==
- Battle of Hartmannswillerkopf — German forces shelled and then stormed French defenses on the Hartmannswillerkopf summit, but were pushed back.
- Battle of Hill 60 — The British 15th Brigade relieved most of the 13th Brigade on the hill at dawn.
- Defense of Van — Violent crackdowns on Armenian unrest around Van, Turkey peaked when 2,500 Armenian men in the village of Erciş were executed.
- During the Gallipoli campaign, the Royal Navy balloon ship Manica lofted her observation balloon for the first time in combat. The air observer in the balloon directed fire against Ottoman positions for the armored cruiser Bacchante. Manica's work during the campaign encouraged the British Admiralty to order additional balloon ships.
- The U.S. Supreme Court denied an appeal in a 7–2 vote for the new trial for Leo Frank in the murder of Mary Phagan.
- William Barnes Jr. sued former U.S. President Theodore Roosevelt for libel, following public accusations of corruption made by Roosevelt in 1914 when Barnes was chairman of the New York Republican State Committee. Over five weeks, Roosevelt testified and provided evidence that the corruption charges were true, including testimony on his behalf from future U.S. President Franklin D. Roosevelt. The jury eventually ruled in favor of Roosevelt and voted to acquit him, effectively ending Barnes influence within the Republican Party.
- Born: Harry Craft, American baseball player, center fielder for the Cincinnati Reds from 1937 to 1942, 1940 World Series champion; in Ellisville, Mississippi, United States (d. 1995)
- Died: Thomas Playford, 77, Australian politician, 17th Premier of South Australia (b. 1837)

== April 20, 1915 (Tuesday) ==
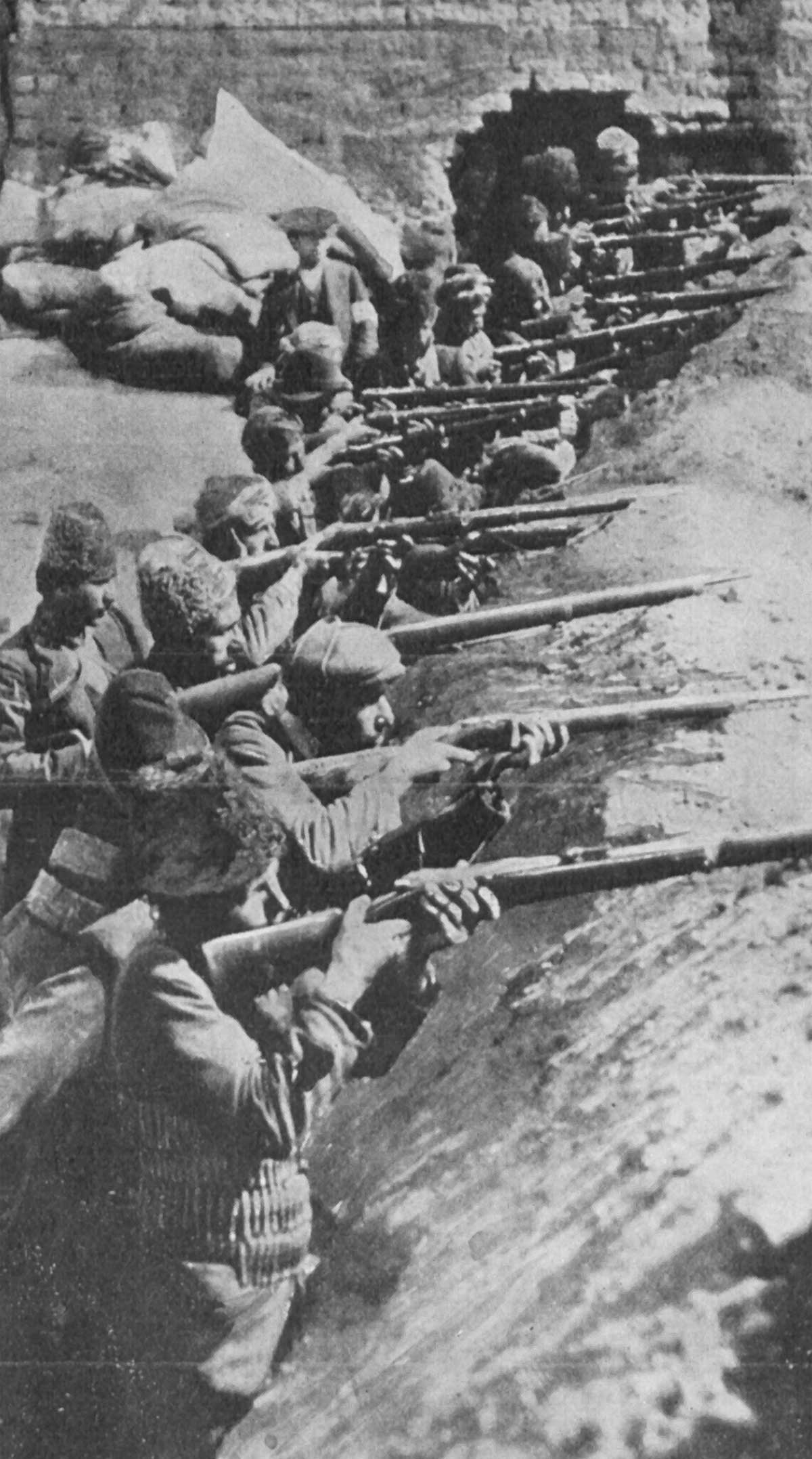
Armenians in the trenches defending Van, Turkey from Ottoman forces.

- A rail station was opened in Wauchope, New South Wales as part of the North Coast railway line in Australia.
- Defense of Van — Tensions from Ottoman forces trying to suppress militia in the city of Van, Turkey escalated when an altercation at a sentry post resulted in Ottoman soldiers shooting two Armenian civilians. Resulting violence from the shootings resulted in Ottoman forces formally laying siege to the city.
- Battle of Hill 60 — German forces bombarded British defenses throughout the day before attacking with infantry in the evening.
- The 58th and 61st Battalions were established to reinforce the Canadian Corps on the Western Front.
- During an aerial reconnaissance mission along the U.S.-Mexican border in a Martin biplane, American pilot Byron Q. Jones and observer Thomas D. Milling were fired upon by Mexican forces on the ground. Their plane was hit, but they were uninjured. This was the first time U.S. military air servicemen came under enemy fire.
- The Chicago, Rock Island and Pacific Railroad entered receivership.
- Born: Alvin M. Weinberg, American physicist, director of the Oak Ridge National Laboratory during the Manhattan Project; in Chicago, United States (d. 2006)

== April 21, 1915 (Wednesday) ==
- Battle of Hill 60 — German artillery barrages turned the hill into a moonscape. The British II Corps and V Corps practiced battle simulations over the next two days but soon were diverted north as the Second Battle of Ypres began.
- The opera house Theatre Circo opened to the public in Braga, Portugal with a performance of Ruggero Leoncavallo's operetta La reginetta delle rose.
- Finnish composer Jean Sibelius saw sixteen swans over Lake Tuusula in Finland, which immediately inspired him to write the theme that became the finalé to his Symphony No. 5.
- Born: Anthony Quinn, Mexican actor, known for his film roles in La Strada, Zorba the Greek, and Lawrence of Arabia, recipient for Academy Award for Best Supporting Actor in Viva Zapata! and Lust for Life; as Manuel Antonio Rodolfo Quinn Oaxaca, in Chihuahua City, Mexico (d. 2001)
- Died: Adèle Hugo, 84, French matron, youngest child to Victor Hugo (b. 1830)

== April 22, 1915 (Thursday) ==
- Second Battle of Ypres — The Germans launched the first large scale use of poison gas on the Western Front, launching grenades carrying chlorine gas into French and Canadian trenches. The Allies sustained massive casualties, but Canadian forces who bore the brunt of the chemical attacks at Kitcheners' Wood managed to devise makeshift gas masks of urine-soaked rags and so were able to hold their ground.
- Gorlice–Tarnów Offensive — General August von Mackensen was given command of a combined German-Austro-Hungarian force of 170,000 men in Galicia (now western Poland), named Army Group Mackensen, to break through the Russian front line defended by 60,000 Russian troops.
- An application to commute the death sentence of Leo Frank was submitted to the Georgia Prison Commission.
- The historical romance film The Captive, directed by Cecil B. DeMille and starring Blanche Sweet, was released. The film was considered lost until 1970 and it is now preserved in the Library of Congress.
- Born: Charles Bond, American air force officer, commander of the Twelfth Air Force, 28th and 25th Air Divisions during World War II, two-time recipient of the Legion of Merit, Air Force Distinguished Service Medal, Distinguished Flying Cross, and Order of the Cloud and Banner; in Dallas, United States (d. 2009)
- Died: Yane Sandanski, 42, Bulgarian revolutionary leader, member of the Supreme Macedonian-Adrianople Committee; assassinated (b. 1872)

== April 23, 1915 (Friday) ==
- The Australian weekly newspaper The Murrumbidgee Irrigator distributed its first issue in Leeton, New South Wales, Australia. It would be renamed The Irrigator in 2001.
- Born: George Smith, British association football player, played centre half for clubs including the Queens Parks Rangers from 1938 to 1950, and managed teams from 1950 to 1970 including Portsmouth; in Bromley-by-Bow, England (d. 1983)
- Died:
  - Rupert Brooke, English poet, author of The Soldier and other war poems; died of sepsis (b. 1887)
  - Jimmy Duffy, Irish-born Canadian distance runner and soldier, winner of the 1914 Boston Marathon; killed in action during the Second Battle of Ypres (b. 1890)

== April 24, 1915 (Saturday) ==
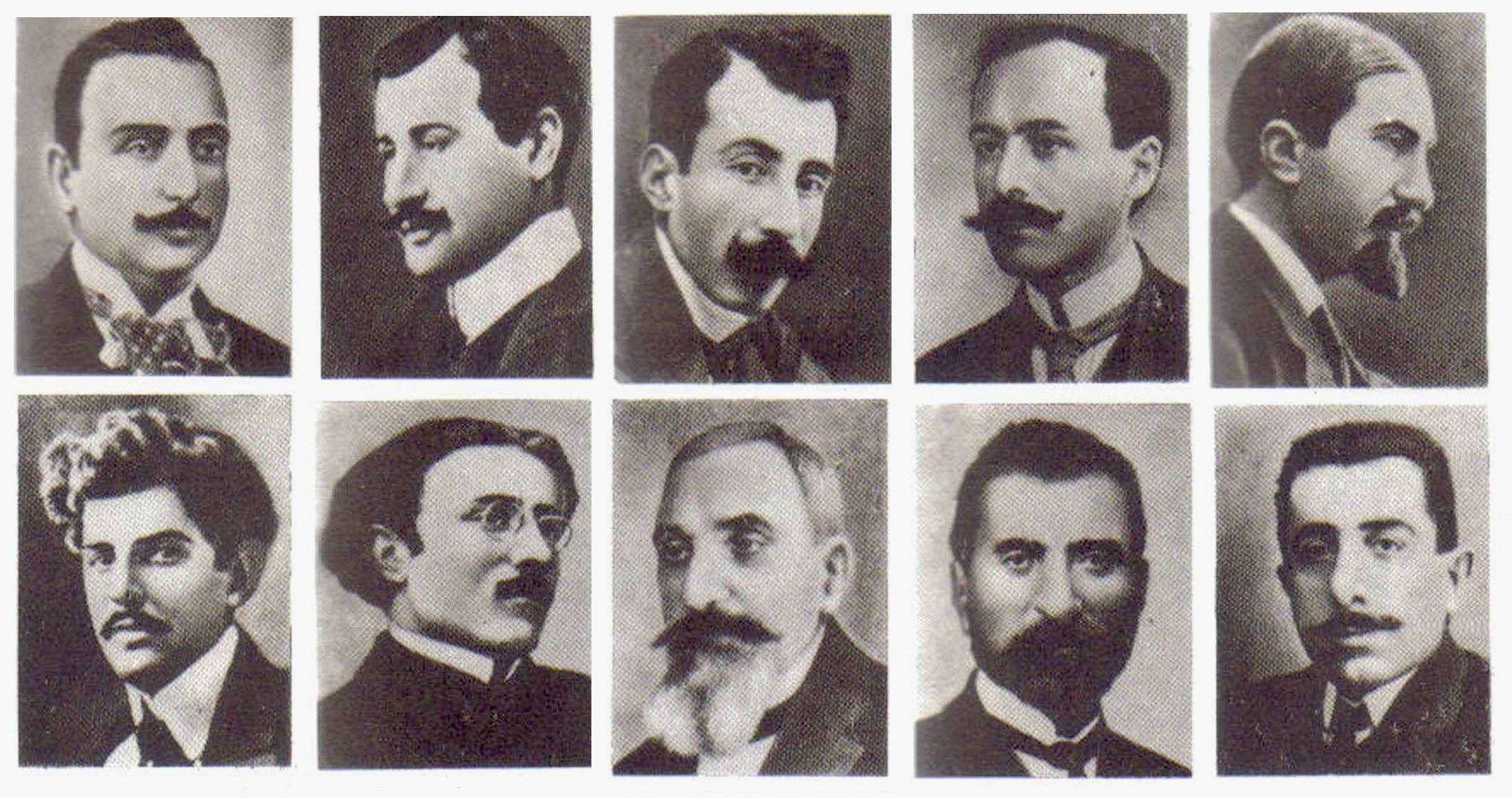
Some of the Armenian intellectuals detained on April 24. Most would be deported and eventually killed during the Armenian genocide.

- The Armenian genocide began with the deportation of Armenian notables from Constantinople. Among literary deportees who perished in the coming genocide were Dikran Chökürian, Armen Dorian, Melkon Giurdjian, Ardashes Harutiunian, Jacques Sayabalian, Ruben Sevak, Siamanto, Rupen Zartarian and actor Yenovk Shahen. Survivors included Yervant Odian and Alexander Panossian.
- Australian submarine HMAS AE2 sneaked through the Dardanelles and sank an Ottoman Navy cruiser at Chanak.
- Second Battle of Ypres — German forces launched a poison gas attack on Canadian forces around the village of St. Julien, allowing them to take the village.
- The Black Watch Brigade of the British Army was disbanded.
- The last FA Cup to be held before all future football championships were cancelled due to World War I was played at Old Trafford, Manchester, England before a large ground of over 49,000 spectators. Sheffield defeated Chelsea 3–0 to win the championship.
- Torquay Girls' Grammar School was established in Torquay, Devon, England.
- The musical Betty, by Frederick Lonsdale and Gladys Buchanan Unger with music by Paul Rubens and lyrics by Adrian Ross, made its second British run at the Daly's Theatre in London.
- British ocean liner RMS Lusitania arrived in New York City. Around the same time, the German embassy in Washington D.C. issued a public warning that the waters around Great Britain were now considered a war zone and ships flying a British flag would be considered targets by German U-boats.
- The Society of Midland Authors was established in Chicago to provide a literary association for writers in twelve states in the Midwestern United States. Noted members have included Jane Addams and Carl Sandburg.
- Born:
  - Michael Carver, British army officer, Chief of the Defence Staff from 1973 to 1976, recipient of the Order of the Bath, Order of the British Empire, Military Cross, and Distinguished Service Order; as Richard Michael Power Carver, in Bletchingley, England (d. 2001)
  - William Goyen, American writer, author of The House of Breath; as Charles William Goyen, in Trinity, Texas, United States (d. 1983)
- Died: Erasmus Darwin, 33, British businessman and soldier, grandson to Charles Darwin; killed in action during the Second Battle of Ypres (b. 1881)

== April 25, 1915 (Sunday) ==
New Zealand troops landing at Gallipoli.

- Gallipoli campaign — The Australian and New Zealand Army Corps landed at Anzac Cove while British and French troops landed at Cape Helles to begin the Allied invasion of the Gallipoli peninsula in the Ottoman Empire.
  - Ottoman troops attacked to prevent French troops from landing at Kumkale, Çanakkale in Gallipoli. The French were able to make a beachhead but could not push further into Ottoman-held territory. The Ottomans suffered 1,735 casualties while the French lose 786 men killed or wounded.
  - The 57th Regiment of the Ottoman Fifth Army charged to defend Anzac Cove staged a bayonet charge against landing ANZAC forces after running out of ammunition. Every man in the regiment was killed or wounded. In respect to their sacrifice, the modern Turkish Army retired the 57th Regiment designation.
  - Casualties for the first day of the campaign alone estimate between 300 and 400 dead among Anzac forces. Among the noted casualties during the landing at Anzac Cove included William Henry Strahan, author of the poem The Bugle Call, former association football players Rupert Balfe, Alan Cordner, Claude Crowl, Charlie Fincher, Fen McDonald, and Joe Pearce, and former rugby players Edward Larkin and Blair Swannell. Turkish casualties were estimated to be around 2,000.
- Second Battle of Ypres — Canadian forces counter-attacked but failed to recapture St. Julien.
- Defense of Van — The first few hundred Armenian refugees fleeing massacres in villages around Van, Turkey arrived into the city.
- Battle of Hartmannswillerkopf — German forces stormed and surrounded nearly 1,000 French troops defending the Hartmannswillerkopf summit. French artillery barrages later in the day forced them to pull back, finally rendering the mountain a sort of no man's land until the end of December.
- Born:
  - Henry J. McAnulty, American clergy and academic, 9th president of Duquesne University; in Pittsburgh, United States (d. 1995)
  - Mort Weisinger, American comic book editor, co-creator of the Aquaman, Green Arrow, and Johnny Quick; as Mortimer Weisinger, in New York City, United States (d. 1978)
- Died: Frederick W. Seward, 84, American politician, 6th and 11th United States Assistant Secretary of State, son of William H. Seward (b. 1830)

== April 26, 1915 (Monday) ==
- China rejected the Twenty-One Demands document sent by Japan, resulting in Japan taking out its most controversial section that contained demands to install Japanese advisers in China's finance and police sectors, build three new railroads, and take control of the province of Fujian.
- German colonial forces assaulted the South African-held town of Trekkopje during the Battle of Trekkopjes but were repulsed by a unit of armored cars equipped with machine guns.
- At the Second Battle of Ypres, Canadian forces renewed attacks on St. Julien but were forced back with the loss of more than 1,940 casualties.
- British fighter pilot William Barnard Rhodes-Moorhouse, 27, of the No. 2 Squadron was mortally wounded while carrying out a bombing attack on a railway junction at Kortrijk, Belgium, and died the next day. He became the first airman to receive the Victoria Cross posthumously.
- Treaty of London — Italy secretly agreed to leave the Triple Alliance with Germany and Austria-Hungary and join with the Triple Entente in exchange for territories of Austria-Hungary on its borders.
- Died: John Bunny, 51, American silent film comedian, known for bumbling comedies such as Bunny Dips Into Society and Bunny as a Reporter; died from Bright's disease (b. 1863)

== April 27, 1915 (Tuesday) ==
- Gallipoli campaign — Allied forces were able to advance about 2 miles (3.2 km) up the Turkish peninsula towards Krithia despite a counterattack by Ottoman troops.
- French cruiser Léon Gambetta was sunk in the Mediterranean Sea off Santa Maria di Leuca, Apulia, Italy by Austro-Hungarian submarine SM U-4 with the loss of 684 of her 821 crew, including Rear Admiral Victor-Baptistin Senès and all his commissioned officers. The captain of the submarine was Georg von Trapp (later to be known as patriarch of the Von Trapp Family Singers).
- The University of Illinois Board of Trustees voted to establish the UIUC College of Business for courses in economics, business management and transportation.
- The Church of Jesus Christ of Latter-day Saints began encouraging a church-wide practice among Mormon families to have a Family Home Evening once a week, usually on Mondays, for family members to spend time together in prayer, study and other activities as a way to strengthen familial and spiritual bonds.
- Born:
  - Eric Kemp, British clergy, bishop for the Church of England from 1974 to 2001; in England (d. 2009)
  - Hovhannes Shiraz, Armenian poet, best known for "The Armenian Dante-esque" about the Armenian genocide; as Onik Tadevosi Karapetyan, in Alexandropol, Russian Empire (present-day Gyumri, Armenia) (d. 1984)
- Died: Alexander Scriabin, 43, Russian composer, known for symphonic compositions such as The Poem of Ecstasy; died of sepsis (b. 1872)

== April 28, 1915 (Wednesday) ==
- First Battle of Krithia — Despite the use of 14,000 French and British troops, the Allies failed to capture Krithia from the Ottoman Empire on Gallipoli peninsula and suffered 2,000 British and 1,001 French casualties.
- Defense of Van — With news of unrest growing in Van, Turkey, General Nikolai Yudenich for the Imperial Russian Army dispatched a Cossack brigade and Armenian volunteer units to the city.
- The 1915 International Congress of Women was held over three days at The Hague, with 1,136 delegates from 12 countries in attendance. Using much of the platform put forward by the Woman's Peace Party from the United States, the congress established the International Committee of Women for Permanent Peace with American suffrage leader Jane Addams as president. The committee's mandate was to extend women's suffrage internationally and advocate the end of the World War I by diplomatic means. The committee eventually formed the Women's International League for Peace and Freedom.
- Malay tribal leader Tok Janggut resisted arrest in his home village for tax evasion, as part of his protest against British colonial rule in Kelantan, Malaysia. In a resulting riot between locals and colonial, Janggut was alleged to have stabbed one of the arresting officers to death. Janggut fled and organized an armed rebellion that went for two months before his death on June 25.
- Manhattan retailer and financial company J.B. Greenhut & Company filed for bankruptcy after its private bank experienced a crippling bank run earlier in April.
- The Geibi Railway opened the Geibi Line in the Okayama Prefecture, Japan, with stations Shiwachi, Kamikawatachi, Kōtachi, Yoshidaguchi, Mukaihara, Ibaraichi, Shiwaguchi, Nakamita, Karuga, Shimofukawa, Kumura, and Akiyaguchi serving the line.
- The Footlights theater group debuted in Honolulu. The group renamed itself the Honolulu Community Theatre in 1934, and then in 1990 to its present name Diamond Head Theatre. The theater is now the third-oldest continuous-running performing arts organization in the United States.

== April 29, 1915 (Thursday) ==
- Battle of Gurin — A British fort manned by 42 colonial troops managed to hold off a larger German force between 300 and 400 soldiers in British Nigeria near German Cameroon. The British unit sustained 13 casualties while the Germans had 45.
- Senussi campaign — An Italian force was defeated by Senussi rebels at Gasr Bu Hadi, Libya, with casualties estimated between 3,000 and 4,000.
- American destroyer USS Wadsworth was launched at Bath Iron Works in Bath, Maine and would eventually participate in World War I.
- British monitor ships HMS Havelock and HMS Raglan were launched untitled at Harland and Wolff in Belfast (both would not be named until June 20) and were assigned to the Gallipoli campaign.
- Survivors of the German marine landing party originally stranded in the Indian Ocean after their ship SMS Emden was destroyed in the Battle of Cocos arrived in Al Wajh, a port city on the Red Sea. They marched inland to the Hejaz railway where they traveled to Constantinople.
- The 9th Battalion was established to reinforce the Canadian Corps on the Western Front.
- The Asheville Masonic Temple officially opened in Asheville, North Carolina and is now listed in the National Register of Historic Places.
- Born: Donald Mills, American singer, lead tenor of The Mills Brothers; in Piqua, Ohio, United States (d. 1999)

== April 30, 1915 (Friday) ==
- The Royal Naval Division, under Major General Archibald Paris, landed at Gallipoli.
- Defense of Van — Around 15,000 Armenian refugees from the countryside were allowed into Van, Turkey, adding to the 30,000 Armenians already living there. Van Province Governor Djevdet Bey hoped by concentrating so many refugees in one place, it would overwhelm the city's food supply and cause starvation, thus lowering armed resistance against Ottoman forces.
- Australian submarine HMAS AE2 sustained battle damage during naval operations in the Dardanelles campaign in the Sea of Marmara and was scuttled. All the crew were captured by Ottoman forces and imprisoned, with four dying during internment.
- German submarine SM U-37 struck a mine and sank in the English Channel.
- The Yugoslav Committee was established in London to promote the idea of unifying the Balkan regions where many Serbs, Croats, and Slovenes resided into a single state, leading to the creation of Yugoslavia in 1918.
- Born:
  - Elio Toaff, Italian rabbi, Chief Rabbi of Rome from 1951 to 2002; in Livorno, Kingdom of Italy (present-day Italy) (d. 2015)
  - Bruce Henderson, American entrepreneur, founder of Boston Consulting Group; in Nashville, Tennessee, United States (d. 1992)
