= Greenhut =

Greenhut is a surname. Notable people with the surname include:

- Joseph B. Greenhut (1843–1918), American military officer
- Robert Greenhut (born 1942), American film producer

== See also ==
- J.B. Greenhut & Company, former New York business
