= March 1915 =

Month of 1915

<<	March 1915					>>
Su	Mo	Tu	We	Th	Fr	Sa
	1	2	3	4	5	6
7	8	9	10	11	12	13
14	15	16	17	18	19	20
21	22	23	24	25	26	27
28	29	30	31

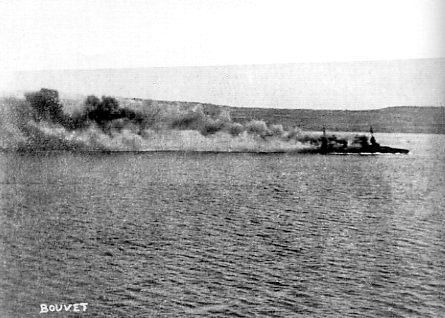
The last moments of the French battleship Bouvet, 18 March 1915.

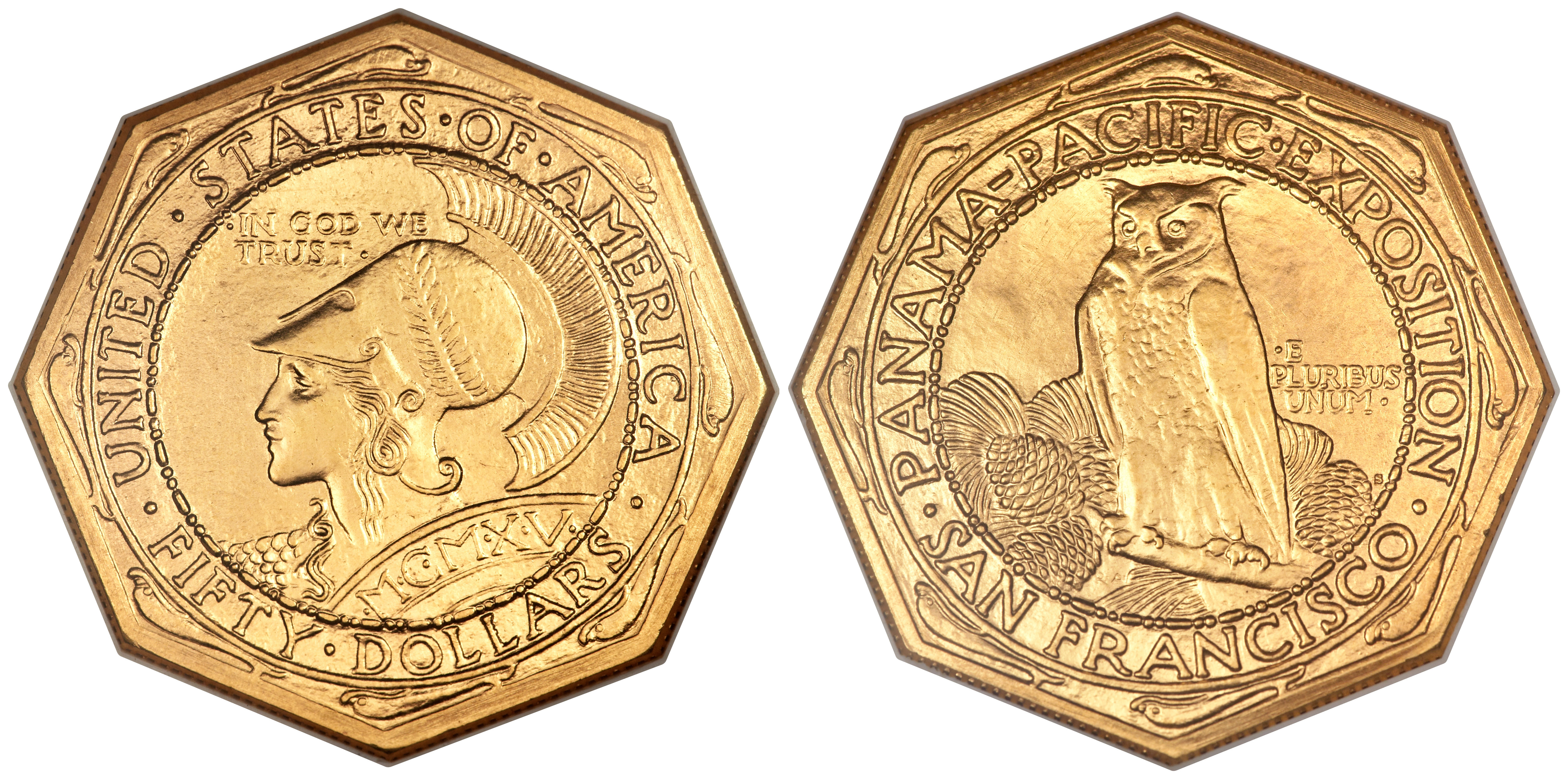
Commemorative $50 coins by Robert Aitken for the Panama–Pacific International Exposition.

The following events occurred in March 1915:

== March 1, 1915 (Monday) ==
- The Imperial Russian Navy's Black Sea Fleet began seaplane carrier raids against the Bosporus and the Ottoman Empire's European Black Sea coast. The raids, which continue until May, were history's first in which battleships play a subsidiary role while operating with aviation ships, foreshadowing the aircraft carrier-battleship task forces of World War II.
- A virulent locust infestation broke out in Palestine and would continue until October.
- The Royal Flying Corps established the No. 15 Squadron at Farnborough Airport, Farnborough, Hampshire, England as a training unit under command of Philip Joubert de la Ferté.
- The 11th, 12th, and 13th Light Horse Regiments of the First Australian Imperial Force were established to serve at the upcoming Gallipoli campaign.
- John Martin Poyer relieved Lieutenant Charles Armijo Woodruff to become the 12th naval governor of the American Samoa.
- The Institute of Arbitrators was established in London (later renamed Chartered Institute of Arbitrators) to represent the interests of alternative dispute resolution (ADR) practitioners. The organization presently has 14,000 members in 130 countries.
- The Fuji Minobu Railway extended the Minobu Line in the Shizuoka Prefecture, Japan with station Shibakawa serving the line.
- The Old Wan Chai Post Office opened on Queen's Road East in Hong Kong, and remains the oldest surviving post office in the city. It was declared a Hong Kong monument in 1990.

== March 2, 1915 (Tuesday) ==
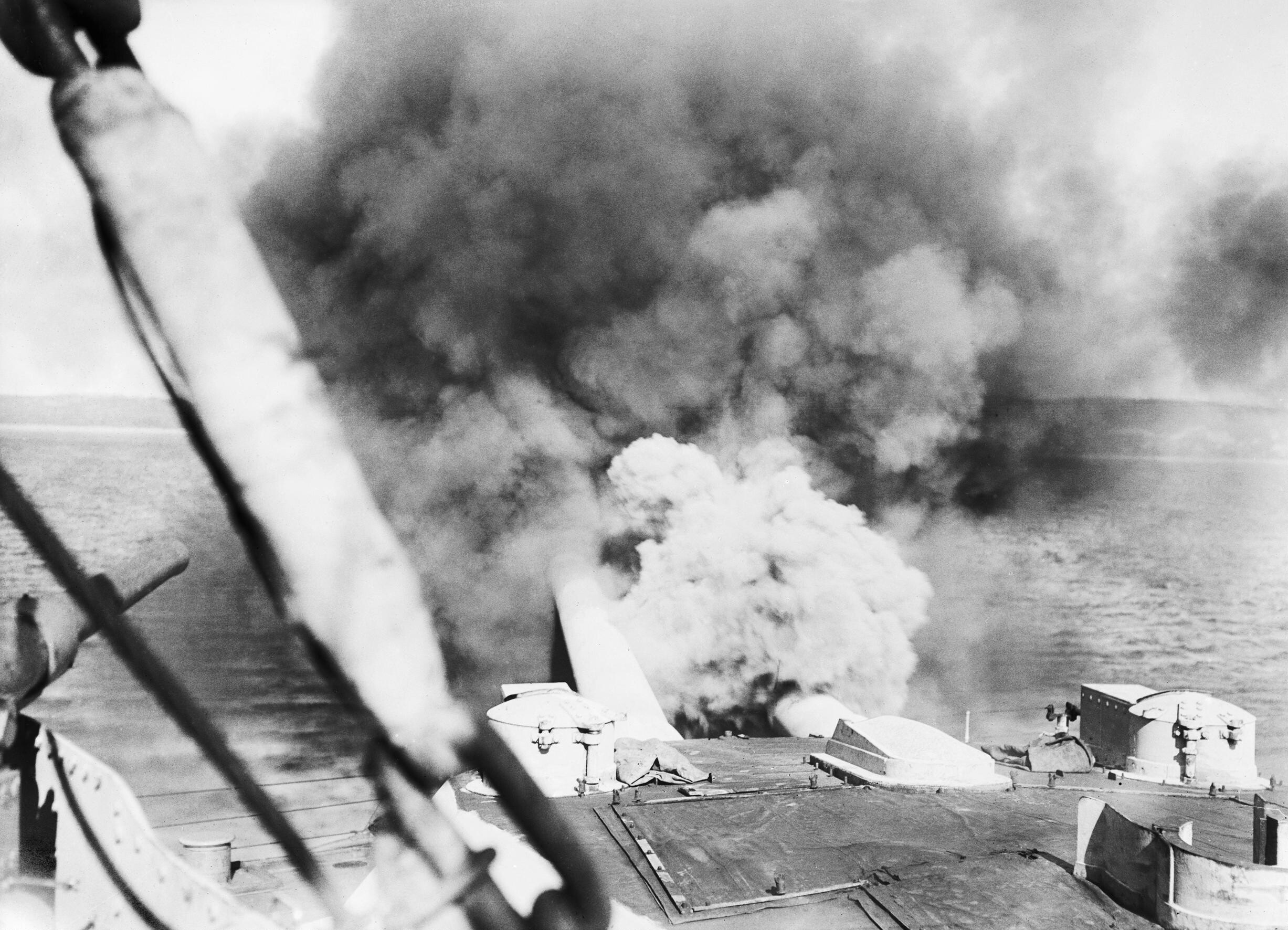
HMS Canopus fires a salvo from her 12 in (300 mm) guns against Ottoman forts in the Dardanelles.

- British battleship HMS Canopus joined in assault missions on the Dardanelles.
- 1915 Vanceboro international bridge bombing — German saboteur Werner Horn was indicted by a federal grand jury at the United States District Court for the District of Massachusetts for transporting explosives on a public train that were later used in an attempt to blow up the Saint Croix–Vanceboro Railway Bridge that crossed the U.S.-Canada border between New Brunswick and Maine. He was sentenced to serve 18 months at the Atlanta Federal Penitentiary in Georgia before he was extradited to Canada where he was tried for sabotage by the Court of Queen's Bench of New Brunswick in Fredericton. He was found guilty and sentenced to serve 10 years at Dorchester Penitentiary in New Brunswick, but was deemed to be insane by prison authorities in 1921, whereby he was released and deported to Germany.
- The United States Motion Picture Corporation was established to produce film comedies, with its main office in Wilkes-Barre, New Jersey and its film studio in Forty Fort, Pennsylvania. The company produced 27 films that became known as the "Black Diamond Comedies" until 1919, after which the studio was sold to another film production company.
- Born: Anthony Lewis, English composer and music educator, principal of Royal Academy of Music from 1968 to 1982; in Bermuda (d. 1983)

== March 3, 1915 (Wednesday) ==
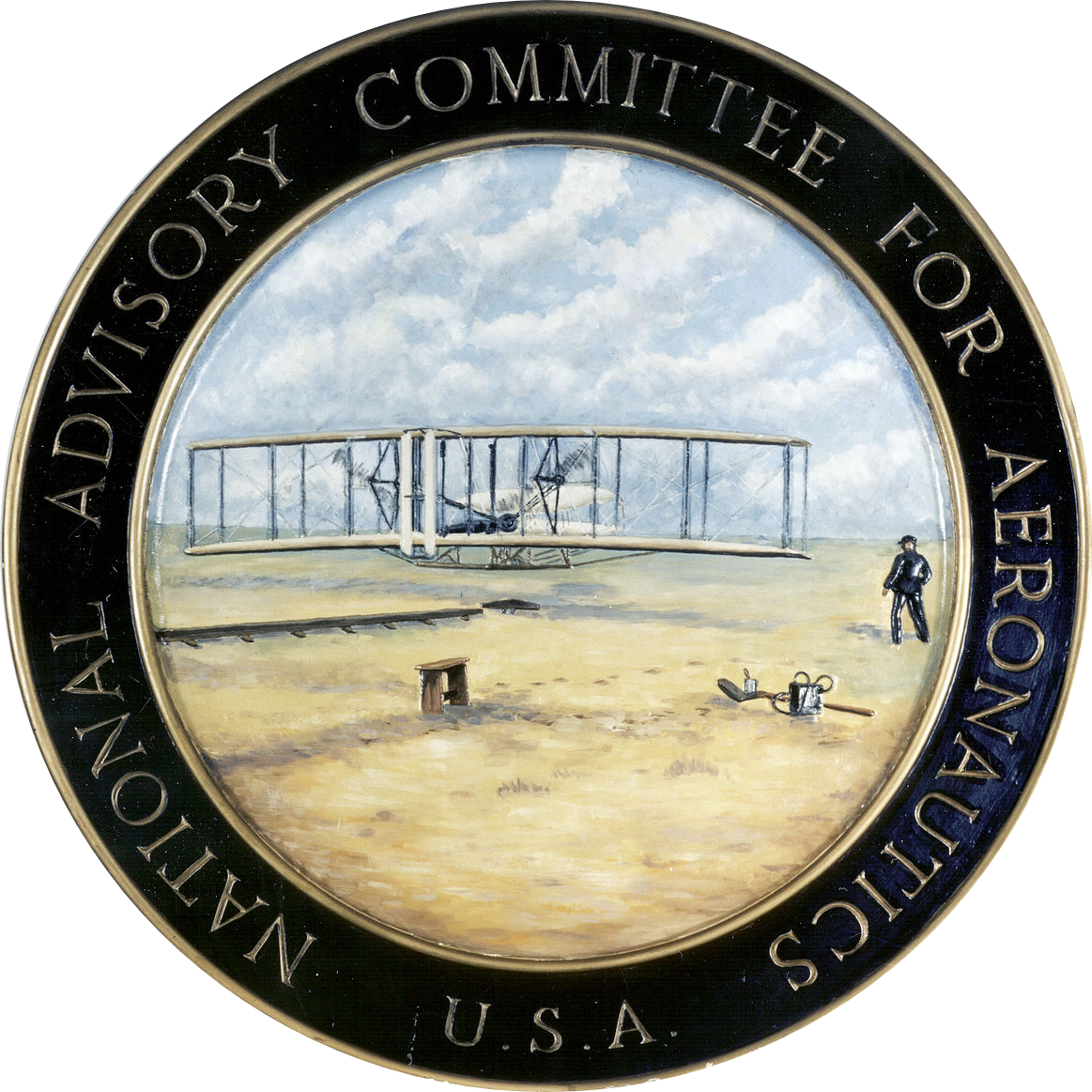
Official seal for the National Advisory Committee for Aeronautics.

- The National Advisory Committee for Aeronautics, the predecessor of NASA, was founded in the United States.
- Mount Mitchell State Park was established in Yancey County, North Carolina, the first state park in that U.S. state.
- The 10th Bavarian Infantry Division and 54th Infantry Division of the Imperial German Army were established, and would see major action at Verdun, Somme and Passchendaele.
- The Ocean to Ocean Bridge that spanned the Colorado River opened in Yuma, Arizona.
- The Great Western Railway closed the Oldbury railway station in Oldbury, West Midlands, England.
- Born:
  - Manning Clark, Australian historian, author of the six-volume A History of Australia, published between 1962 and 1987; as Charles Manning Hope Clark, in Sydney, Australia (d. 1991)
  - Wood B. Kyle, American marine corps officer, commander of the 1st Battalion, 2nd Marines during World War II and 3rd Marine Division during the Vietnam War, two-time recipient of the Silver Star, Legion of Merit, and Distinguished Service Medal; in Pecos, Texas, United States (d. 2000)

== March 4, 1915 (Thursday) ==
- Sessions for the 64th United States Congress began in Washington D.C.
- Admiral Sackville Carden of the Royal Navy cabled Winston Churchill, First Lord of the Admiralty, with revised plans at Churchill's request with an objective for the Mediterranean British fleet to reach Constantinople in 14 days.
- The third German attempt to bomb England using airships failed when a lone naval Zeppelin encountered a gale over the North Sea and was blown out of control over Nieuwpoort, Belgium where Belgian antiaircraft gunners shot her down.
- German submarine SM U-8 was scuttled by the crew after it was ensnared by nets in the English Channel.
- The Zeppelin airship LZ 37 began flying for the Imperial German Navy on bombing raids throughout 1915. It was downed in February 1916 by a British fighter plane.
- The U.S. Government passed the Seamen's Act to preserve the security and safety of workers in the merchant shipping industry, but its ineffectiveness lead to the Merchant Marine Act in 1920.
- The Hardinge Bridge officially opened for rail crossings over the Padma River in British India (now Bangladesh). Named after Baron Hardinge, who was Governor-General of India at the time, the bridge spans 1.8 kilometres (1.1 mi).
- The Yukon Territory in Canada held a general election for 10 seats on the Yukon Territorial Council.

== March 5, 1915 (Friday) ==
- Battle of Hartmannswillerkopf — French forces staged renewed attacks on German defenses on the Hartmannswillerkopf summit on the French-German border, running one German position but stopped by new German defense lines close to the summit. The Germans counterattacked but were repulsed, sustaining 200 casualties in the process. A second attack two days later also failed the push the French off the mountain.
- The 56th Infantry Division of the Imperial German Army was established and fought key battles on the Eastern Front including Gorlice–Tarnów Offensive.
- British destroyer HMS Tipperary was launched by J. Samuel White at East Cowes, Isle of Wight. It served for one year before being sunk in the Battle of Jutland.
- Born: Laurent Schwartz, French mathematician, pioneered the theory of distributions; as Laurent-Moïse Schwartz, in Paris, France (d. 2002)
- Died:
  - Thomas R. Bard, 73, American politician, U.S. Senator for California from 1900 to 1905 (b. 1841)
  - Jim Donnelly, 49, American baseball player, third baseman for the Washington Nationals, Kansas City Cowboys, and the Baltimore Orioles from 1884 to 1899 (b. 1865)

== March 6, 1915 (Saturday) ==
- British destroyers HMS Louis and Laverock were assigned to escort RMS Lusitania to Liverpool, but when the ships tried to contact Lusitania by radio, Captain Daniel Dow only gave his position by code and continued to Liverpool unescorted.
- The 52nd Infantry and 58th Infantry Divisions of the Imperial German Army were established to fight on the Western Front, although the 58th was transferred to the Eastern Front to participate in the Gorlice–Tarnów Offensive.
- British racing driver Dario Resta won his second racing championship title of 1915 in the 10th running of the Vanderbilt Cup at San Francisco while driving a Peugeot EX3.
- Born:
  - Per Vilhelm Brüel, Danish physicist, leading researcher on sound and co-founder of electronics company Brüel & Kjær; in Copenhagen, Denmark (d. 2015)
  - Friedrich Guggenberger, German naval officer, commander of U-boat U-81 when it sank British aircraft carrier HMS Ark Royal, recipient of the Knight's Cross of the Iron Cross; in Munich, Kingdom of Bavaria, German Empire (present-day Bavaria, Germany) (d. 1988)
  - Pete Gray, American baseball player, left fielder of the St. Louis Browns in 1945, first player with one arm to compete in professional baseball; as Peter Wyshner, in Nanticoke, Pennsylvania, United States (d. 2002)
  - Bob Swift, American baseball player, catcher for the St. Louis Browns, Philadelphia Athletics and Detroit Tigers from 1940 to 1953, 1945 World Series champion; as Robert Swift, in Salina, Kansas, United States (d. 1966)

== March 7, 1915 (Sunday) ==
- British collier Bengrove was sunk by torpedo in the Bristol Channel 5 nautical miles (9.3 km) northeast of Ilfracombe, Devon, England by SM U-20, with all 33 crew rescued.
- German noble Bernhard III established the Cross for Merit in War medal for officers that displayed outstanding merit in World War I.
- Born:
  - Jacques Chaban-Delmas, French politician, Prime Minister of France from 1969 to 1972; as Jacques Michel Pierre Delmas, in Paris, France (d. 2000)
  - Johannes Wiese, German air force officer, commander of Jagdgeschwader 52 and Jagdgeschwader 77 for the Luftwaffe during World War II, recipient of the Knight's Cross of the Iron Cross; in Breslau, Kingdom of Prussia, German Empire (present-day Wrocław, Poland) (d. 1991)

== March 8, 1915 (Monday) ==
- San Diego Union Station officially opened, ushering in a new era of rail transport for the city.
- British pilot Eric Gordon England flew the prototype for the White & Thompson Bognor Bloater reconnaissance plane, which was used in 1915 by the Royal Naval Air Service for training and coastal patrols.
- New York City Fire Department Rescue Company 1 was established as the first New York City Fire Department unit designed for specialized rescue operations. The company lost half of its crew when the World Trade Center North Tower collapsed during the September 11 attacks in 2001.
- The Princess Theatre opened in Edmonton with 660 seats and the largest live performance stage in a cinema west of Winnipeg. It is the oldest surviving movie theater in the city.
- Born: Tapio Rautavaara, Finnish field athlete, gold medalist at the 1948 Summer Olympics; as Kaj Tapio Rautavaara, in Prikkala, Grand Duchy of Finland, Russian Empire (present-day Nokia, Finland) (d. 1979)

== March 9, 1915 (Tuesday) ==
- The German 11th Army was established, initially for the Western Front was soon transferred to the Eastern Front where it took part in the Serbian Campaign. The army was dissolved briefly in September before it was reformed, and permanently dissolved in 1919.
- The cargo ship SS Aberdon was torpedoed and sunk in the North Sea off St Abb's Head, Berwickshire, Scotland by German submarine SM U-12 with the loss of fifteen crew.
- German astronomer Karl Wilhelm Reinmuth discovered 799 Gudula, a minor planet, at the Heidelberg Observatory.
- Born:
  - Johnnie Johnson, British air force pilot, commander of Air Forces Middle East from 1963 to 1965, recipient of the Order of the British Empire, Order of the Bath, Legion of Honour, and Legion of Merit; as James Edgar Johnson, in Barrow upon Soar, England (d. 2001)
  - Francisco Matos Paoli, Puerto Rican poet and politician, nominee of the Nobel Prize in Literature, leader of the Nationalist Party of Puerto Rico; in Lares, Puerto Rico (d. 2000)

== March 10, 1915 (Wednesday) ==
- Battle of Neuve Chapelle — Four divisions of Indian Corps troops managed to force a hole in German defenses at Neuve-Chapelle, France.
- In retaliation for sinking merchant ship Aberdon, German submarine U-12 was shelled by Royal Navy ships Ariel and Attack then rammed by Acheron in the North Sea off Eyemouth, Berwickshire, Scotland. The sub sank with the loss of 19 of her 29 crew.
- The 50th Infantry Division of the Imperial German Army was established, and would be heavily engaged in battles at Verdun and Aisne.
- The choral composition All-Night Vigil by Russian composer Sergei Rachmaninoff was first performed by the Moscow Synodal Choir in Moscow as part of a benefit for the Russian war effort.
- Born: Charles Groves, English conductor, musical director for the Royal Liverpool Philharmonic from 1963 to 1967 and the Royal Philharmonic Orchestra from 1967 to 1992; in London, England (d. 1992)
- Died: Charles T. Hinde, 82, American industrialist, co-founder of the Hotel del Coronado in San Diego (b. 1832)

== March 11, 1915 (Thursday) ==
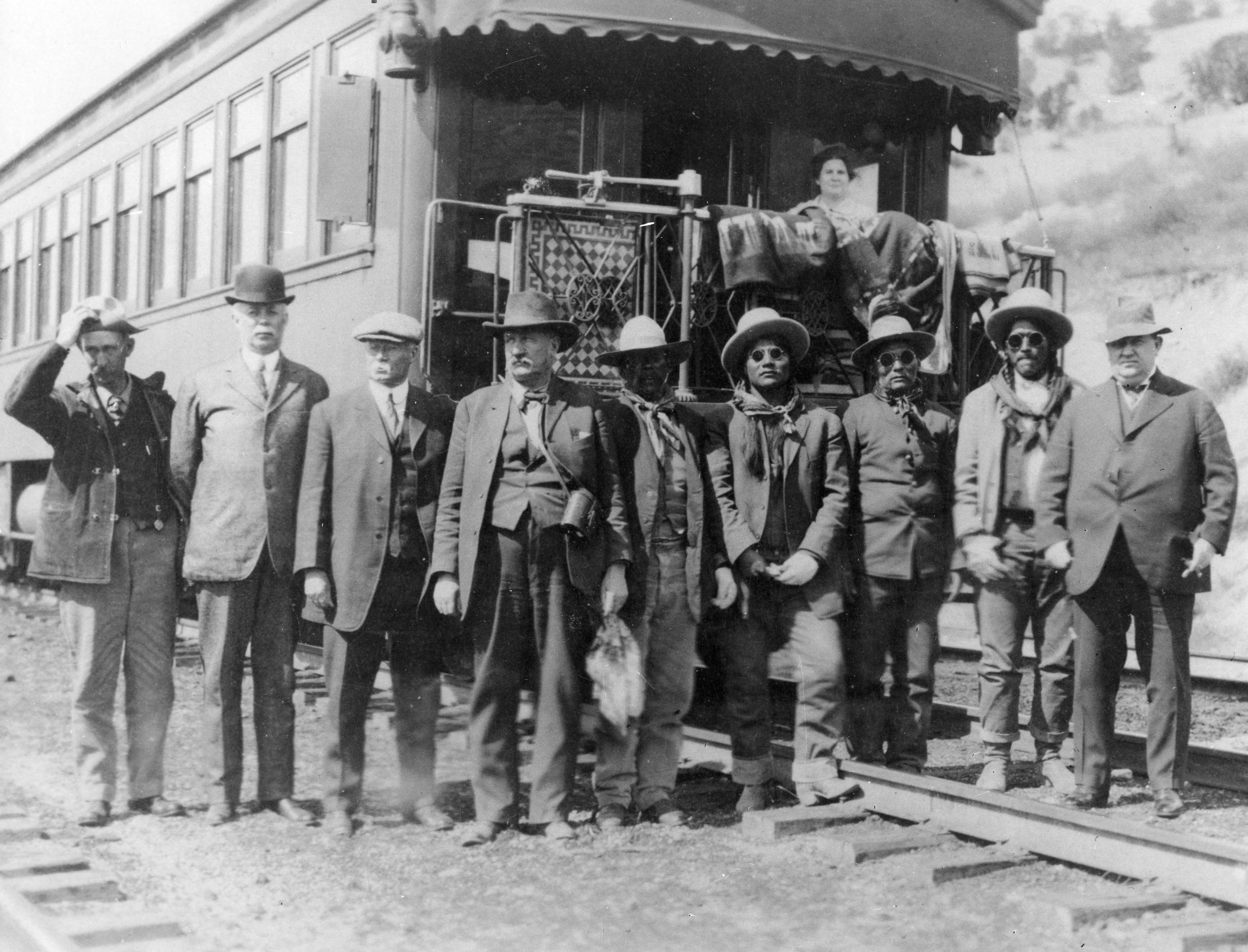
Prisoners of the Bluff War in Thompson, Utah, waiting to board a train for their trial in Salt Lake City.

- British armed merchant cruiser HMS Bayano was sunk in the North Channel off the coast of Scotland by a German U-boat U-27. About 200 crew were lost, with a number of bodies being washed up on the Isle of Man. Only 26 men were saved.
- The Royal Navy converted cargo ship Manica into the first British balloon ship, HMS Manica, the only navy during World War I to design ships that handled observation balloons.
- German auxiliary cruiser SMS Prinz Eitel Friedrich reached port in Newport News, Virginia to be interned after its engine began to wear out, as the United States was still neutral during World War I. The ship spent the last seven months in the Pacific and South Atlantic and sank 11 ships.
- Bluff War — One of the last official armed conflicts between the United States and Native Americans ended when two Paiute chiefs willfully surrendered to the United States Army in Bluff, Utah.
- The first Queen carnival was held in Whanganui, New Zealand as a fundraiser for veteran soldiers.
- Born:
  - Vijay Hazare, Indian cricketer, batsman for the India national cricket team from 1946 to 1953, and for clubs including the Madhya Pradesh cricket team from 1934 to 1961; in Sangli, British India (present-day India) (d. 2004)
  - J. C. R. Licklider, American computer scientist, developed the concept of interactive computing that laid the groundwork for the Internet; as Joseph Carl Robnett Licklider, in St. Louis, United States (d. 1990)
- Died: Thomas Alexander Browne, 88, Australian writer, author of Robbery Under Arms and A Modern Buccaneer (b. 1826)

== March 12, 1915 (Friday) ==
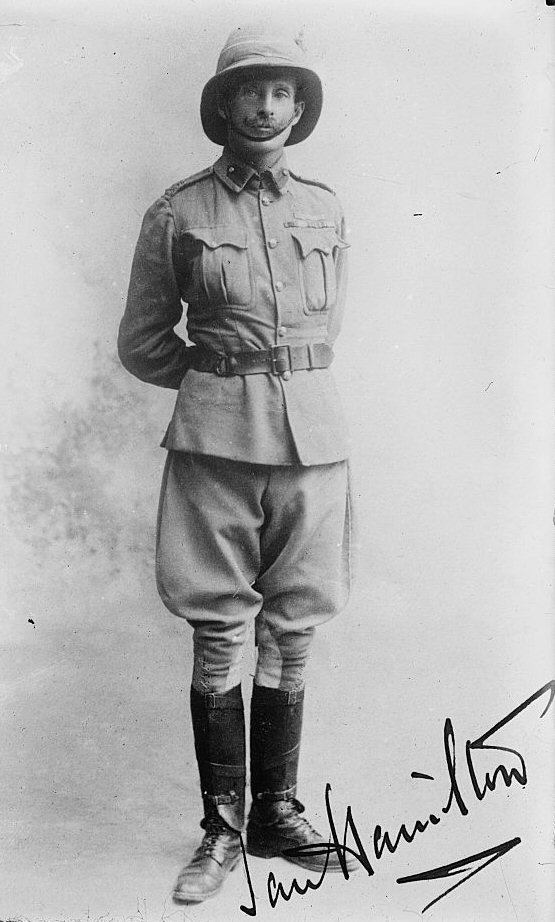
General Ian Hamilton.

- Field Marshal Herbert Kitchener appointed General Ian Hamilton to command an Allied force of 78,000 men to assault Gallipoli near the Dardanelles and open a third front against the Central Powers.
- Battle of Neuve Chapelle — German forces counter-attacked at Neuve-Chapelle, France and while they were unable to recapture territory, their attacks further disrupted uncoordinated British actions to supply troops with ammunition and supplies.
- Born:
  - Alberto Burri, Italian artist, member of the Neo-Dada and Arte Povera movements in Italy; in Città di Castello, Kingdom of Italy (present-day Italy) (d. 1995)
  - Heinrich Setz, German air force officer, commander of Jagdgeschwader 77 and Jagdgeschwader 27 for the Luftwaffe during World War II, recipient of the Knight's Cross of the Iron Cross; in Gundelsdorf, Kingdom of Bavaria, German Empire (present-day Bavaria, Germany) (killed in action, 1943)
- Died: Laura Spelman Rockefeller, 75, American matriarch of the Rockefeller family, wife to John D. Rockefeller (b. 1839)

== March 13, 1915 (Saturday) ==
- Battle of Neuve Chapelle — Ineffective supply lines to arm front line troops forced British command to postpone an offensive and ultimately abandon the plan two days later, ending the battle.
- A British mine-sweeping squadron led by cruiser HMS Amethyst under command of Commodore Roger Keyes attempted to clear minefields around the Dardanelles but shore bombardments from the Ottomans forced them to back off.
- Twenty-One Demands — United States Secretary of State William Jennings Bryan issued a letter revealing the American government's concerns over Japan's rejection of the Open Door Policy and further encroachments on Chinese sovereignty.
- An ongoing feud between Oregon river boat companies Myrtle Point Transportation Company and Coquille River Company continued when Myrtle Point steamboat Telegraph collided with Coquille River steamboat Charm in Coquille City port. The crew of the Charm claimed they made audible warning to Telegraph before the collision, but the crew of the other denied such warnings were heard. Charm was laid up for three days for repairs before returning to service.
- Died: Sergei Witte, 65, Russian state leader, first Prime Minister of Russia; died of meningitis or a brain tumor (b. 1849)

== March 14, 1915 (Sunday) ==
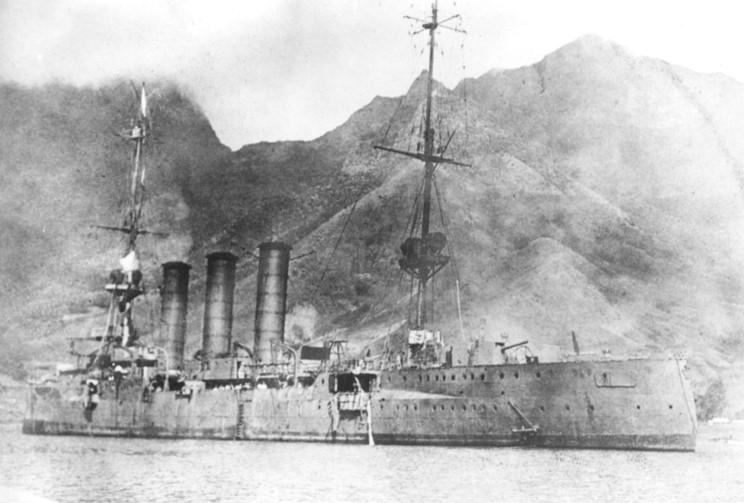
Dresden, flying a white flag, moments prior to her scuttling

- Battle of Más a Tierra — Off the coast of Chile, the British Royal Navy forced the Imperial German Navy light cruiser SMS Dresden to scuttle, effectively destroying the German East Asia Squadron.
- Constantinople Agreement — Britain, France and the Russian Empire agreed to give Constantinople and the Bosporus to Russia in case of victory (the treaty was later nullified by the October Revolution in Russia in 1917).
- Parliamentary elections were held in Chile with the Conservative Party receiving the most votes in the Chamber of Deputies of Chile.
- After having no better luck in securing a ship to Europe, stranded German marines from the defunct SMS Emden returned to the Arabian port of Hodeida and hired two sambuk sailboats to travel up the Arabian coast.
- Ross Sea party — The polar ship Aurora arrived at McMurdo Sound in the Antarctic where it was to anchor for the winter while waiting for the sledge parties to return from their supply depot set-ups for the main Imperial Trans-Antarctic Expedition.
- American aviator Lincoln Beachey was killed in an airplane crash in front of a crowd of 50,000 at the Panama–Pacific International Exposition in San Francisco. Beachey miscalculated his height during a stunt over San Francisco Bay and plunged into the water where he drowned.
- The first edition of the British daily tabloid Sunday Pictorial was published in London. The paper's name was changed in 1963 to its present name Sunday Mirror.
- The Renwick Generating Plant began producing power for Renwick, Iowa. It was added to the National Register of Historic Places in 1995.
- Born: Roy Kellerman, American special agent, member of the United States Secret Service team when President John F. Kennedy was assassinated; in Macomb County, Michigan, United States (d. 1984)
- Died: Walter Crane, 69, English artist, known for his illustrations for classic children's literature including the William Morris fantasy The Story of the Glittering Plain and Oscar Wilde's The Happy Prince and Other Tales (b. 1845)

== March 15, 1915 (Monday) ==
- Universal Studios opened Universal City on 230-acre ranch in the San Fernando Valley, the site of the current Universal Studios Lot.
- The Chicago, Indianapolis and Louisville Railway, later known as the Monon Railroad, acquired control of the Chicago and Wabash Valley Railroad.
- Rail stations Bingham Road, Deptford, Southwark Park, Spa, and Spencer Road were closed in England as part of wartime measures.
- Gem County, Idaho was established with its county seat in Emmett.
- Born:
  - Robert E. Stiemke, American engineer, director of the Georgia Tech Research Institute from 1961 to 1963; in Wisconsin, United States (d. 1979)
  - Carl Emil Schorske, American historian, recipient for the Pulitzer Prize for General Nonfiction for Fin-de-siècle Vienna, a study on modern European history; in New York City, United States (d. 2015)
  - Benjamin Steinberg, American conductor, founder of the Symphony of the New World; in Baltimore, United States (d. 1974)
- Died: George Llewelyn Davies, 21, English soldier, inspiration for the "Lost Boys" of Peter Pan; killed in action at Sint-Elooi, Belgium (b. 1893)

== March 16, 1915 (Tuesday) ==
- Admiral Sackville Carden resigned from his command of the Dardanelles Campaign due to failing health and was replaced with Vice-Admiral John de Robeck.
- The 17th, 18th, 20th, 25th, and 27th Battalions of the First Australian Imperial Force were established for the planned Gallipoli campaign.
- U.S. Navy battleship Pennsylvania was launched by Newport News Shipbuilding in Newport News, Virginia. It would stay out of World War I but play a major role during the Pacific War during World War II.
- A report of the collision between Oregon river boats Telegraph and Charm reached the U.S. Steamboat Inspection Service office in Portland, Oregon.
- The men's fraternity for mechanical engineering students Pi Tau Sigma was established at University of Illinois. Another fraternity with the same Greek letters was formed independently later that year, and the two merged to form a national collegiate in 1916.
- The U.S. Treasury approved the final design and production of the $1 and $50 commemorative coins by for the Panama–Pacific International Exposition.
- Born: Ormond R. Simpson, American marine officer, commander of the 1st Marine Division during the Vietnam War, two-time recipient of the Distinguished Service Medal and four-time recipient of the Legion of Merit; in Corpus Christi, Texas, United States (d. 1998)

== March 17, 1915 (Wednesday) ==
- The Imperial German Army attempted its first airship raid against Great Britain but could not locate targets to drop bombs due to cloud cover.
- Four French soldiers with the rank of corporal were executed by firing squad at Souain-Perthes-lès-Hurlus, France after convicted by courts-martial on charges on insubordination against General Géraud Réveilhac. Critics of the affair argued the charges were made through a "kangaroo court" and the men were scapegoated for the leadership failings of the French Army senior staff. All four soldiers were later pardoned posthumously. The incident later inspired the Stanley Kubrick film Paths of Glory.
- While sailing up the Arabian coast, a sambuk carrying German marines from the lost SMS Emden grounded on a coral reef and sank with no lost crew. However, it forced marine commander Hellmuth von Mücke to hire a larger vessel when the group reached Al Qunfudhah. They sailed to Al Lith, where one of the Germans died from typhus.
- The men's fraternity for biological students Phi Sigma was established at Ohio State University.
- The association football club Yambol was established in Yambol, Bulgaria.
- The Canyon Diablo Bridge opened to traffic in Coconino County, Arizona. It was replaced in 1938 by the Interstate 40 bridge.
- The town of Bentley, Alberta was incorporated.
- Born:
  - Hans Namuth, German-American photographer, best known for his portraits including artist Jackson Pollock; in Essen, German Empire (present-day Germany) (d. 1990)
  - Bill Roycroft, Australian equestrian, Olympics gold medal winner at the 1960 Summer Olympics, and bronze medal winner at the 1968 and 1976 Summer Olympics; as James William George Roycroft, in Melbourne, Australia (d. 2011)
  - Gale W. McGee, American politician, Senator for Wyoming from 1959 to 1977; in Lincoln, Nebraska, United States (d. 1992)

== March 18, 1915 (Thursday) ==
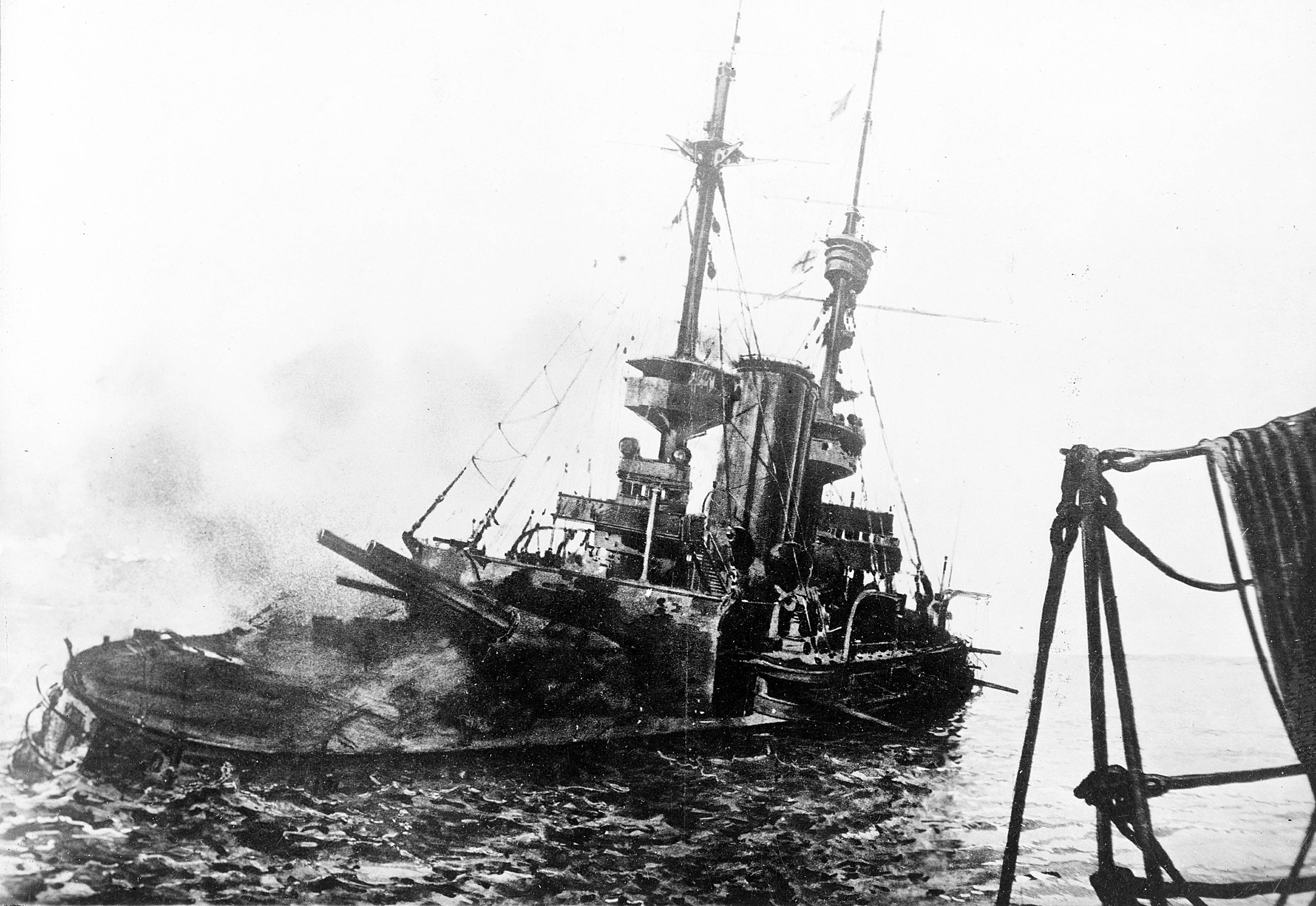
HMS Irresistible abandoned and sinking.

- Naval operations in the Dardanelles campaign failed when three Allied ships struck mines and sank, including the French battleship Bouvet with the loss of 660 of her 710 crew, British battleship HMS Irresistible with the loss of about 150 of her 780 crew, and HMS Ocean which had the fortune of having most of her crew rescued. French battleship Gaulois was luckier; she was beached after striking a mine but was refloated on 22 March. She was repaired and returned to service.
- Royal Navy battleship HMS Dreadnought sank U-29 with all 32 crew aboard in the Pentland Firth by ramming her, the only time this tactic was known to have been successfully used by a battleship.
- Royal Navy battleship Malaya was launched by Armstrong Whitworth in Newcastle upon Tyne, England and would service in the Battle of Jutland.
- Russian fighter pilot Alexander Kazakov used a grapnel to hook his aircraft to a German Albatros two-seater aircraft in mid-air, hoping to destroy the Albatros by detonating a small bomb fixed to the grapnel. When the grapnel mechanism jammed as he unreeled it, Kazakov opted to down the Albatros by ramming it with his undercarriage.
- The Burrell Memorial Hospital opened in Roanoke, Virginia. It was listed on the National Register of Historic Places in 2003.
- The town of Verónica, Buenos Aires, Argentina was established.
- Born: Richard Condon, American novelist, author of The Manchurian Candidate; in New York City, United States (d. 1996)

== March 19, 1915 (Friday) ==
- The Defence of India Act was enacted to provide the colonial government in British India wide-spread powers to enforce criminal law, especially in curtailing nationalist and revolutionary activities in the country during and after World War I.
- Pluto was photographed for the first time but was not classified as a planet.
- The Campeonato Uruguayo Federal de Básquetbol was established along with the Uruguayan Basketball Championship series under the governing body of the Uruguayan Basketball Federation (formed the same year). It was replaced by the Liga Uruguaya de Basketball in 2003 while retaining the championship series.
- Born:
  - Gordon Brettell, British air force officer, member of No. 92 Squadron and of the escape team from the German POW camp Stalag Luft III during World War II; as Edward Gordon Brettell, in Chertsey, England (executed, 1944)
  - Sam Lesser, British journalist and soldier, member of the International Brigades during the Spanish Civil War and reporter for the Morning Star; as Manassah or Manasseh Lesser, in London, England (d. 2010)
  - Patricia Morison, US actress and singer, best known for lead title roles in Kiss Me, Kate and The King and I; as Eileen Patricia Augusta Fraser Morison, in New York City, United States (d. 2018)
  - Norman Yardley, English cricketer, batsman for the England cricket team from 1938 to 1950, and the Marylebone Cricket Club from 1938 to 1952; in Gawber, England (d. 1989)
- Died: Alice Haldeman, 61, American philanthropist, founder of the Girard Public Library and first US woman to be president of a bank (State Bank of Girard), sister to feminist leader Jane Addams and mother to feminist Anna Marcet Haldeman (b. 1853)

== March 20, 1915 (Saturday) ==
- The 3rd and 4th Mounted Divisions of the British Army were established.
- The Puławy Legion of the Imperial Russian Army was established as a counteract against the Polish Legions.
- German cruiser SMS Frankfurt was launched by Kaiserliche Werft Kiel in Kiel, Germany, and would participate the following year in the Battle of Jutland.
- Torpedo boat 87 F was launched by Ganz Works in Fiume, Austria-Hungary to serve in the Austro-Hungarian Navy. After World War I, the newly formed Yugoslavia purchased the ship and renamed it T5 to serve as its naval defense.
- The Kyushu Railway extended the Nippō Main Line in the Miyazaki Prefecture, Japan with stations Kiyotake and Sosanji serving the line.
- The tragic opera Fedra by Italian composer Ildebrando Pizzetti premiered at the La Scala in Milan.
- Spanish astronomer Josep Comas i Solà discovered minor planet 804 Hispania at the Fabra Observatory in Barcelona, the first of its kind discovered by a Spaniard.
- Born:
  - Rudolf Kirchschläger, Austrian politician, eighth President of Austria; in Niederkappel, Austria-Hungary (present-day Austria) (d. 2000)
  - Sviatoslav Richter, Russian pianist, known for virtuoso performances on many compositions by Bach, Handel and others; in Zhytomyr, Russian Empire (present-day Ukraine) (d. 1997)
  - Sister Rosetta Tharpe, American gospel singer, best known for her gospel recordings in the 1930s and 1940s that influenced early rock musicians such as Elvis Presley and Chuck Berry; as Rosetta Nubin, in Cotton Plant, Arkansas, United States (d. 1973)

== March 21, 1915 (Sunday) ==
- Power tools manufacturer Makita was established in Nagoya, Aichi, Japan.
- Japanese Government Railways extended the Ban'etsu East Line in Fukushima Prefecture, Japan with stations Ononiimachi, Kanmata, Ōgoe and Funehiki serving the line.
- Born: Alykul Osmonov, Kyrgyz poet, promoted modernism; in Kaptal-Aryk, Kyrgyzstan (d. 1950)
- Died: Frederick Winslow Taylor, 59, American engineer and economist, one of the leaders of the Efficiency movement (b. 1856)

== March 22, 1915 (Monday) ==
- Siege of Przemyśl — Russian forces captured the fortress in Galicia (now south-eastern Poland), ending the longest siege of the war. The Russians took over 117,000 Austro-Hungarian soldiers prisoner including nine generals, 93 senior staff officers, and 2,500 other officers.
- The London Underground extended the Metropolitan line with a new tube station at North Harrow.
- Rail stations Abingdon Road, Brentford, Combe Hay, Dunkerton Colliery, Garsington Bridge, Hallen, Henbury, Hinksey, Horspath, Iffley, Madeley, Midford, Monkton Combe, North Filton, Radford and Timsbury, and Trumpers Crossing were closed in England as part of wartime measures.
- Born:
  - John McConnell, American activist, founder of Earth Day; in Davis City, Iowa, United States (d. 2012)
  - Erling Kongshaug, Norwegian sharpshooter, gold medalist at the 1952 Summer Olympics; in Oslo, Norway (d. 1993)

== March 23, 1915 (Tuesday) ==
- Battle of Hartmannswillerkopf — Renewed French attacks on Hartmannswillerkopf got them within 150 metres of the summit and were able to hold their ground from further German counterattacks.
- The modern-day University of Murcia was established in Murcia, Spain.
- Born:
  - Nehemiah Levanon, Latvian-Israeli intelligence officer, head of Nativ from 1970 to 1982; in Rūjiena, Governorate of Livonia, Russian Empire (present-day Latvia) (d. 2003)
  - Vasily Zaytsev, Soviet sniper, best known for making 225 confirmed kills of enemy German soldiers during the Battle of Stalingrad in World War II; in Yeleninka, Russian Empire (present-day Russia) (d. 1991)

== March 24, 1915 (Wednesday) ==
- The Fifth Army of the Ottoman Empire was established under the command of German military adviser Otto Liman von Sanders to defend the Dardanelles from the Allies. It was dissolved in 1918.
- Five Royal Naval Air Service Avro 504s of No. 1 Squadron bombed the German submarine depot at Hoboken in Antwerp, Belgium, starting a fire in the shipyard that destroyed two German submarines.
- The No. 30 Squadron of the Royal Flying Corps officially received its designated squadron number when it mobilized to defend airspace over Egypt, even though it had been established in October 1914.
- The 11th Bavarian Infantry Division was established, and would serve in the Gorlice–Tarnów Offensive in the coming spring.
- Born:
  - John Rogers Cox, American artist, member of the regionalism and magic realism movements in the United States; in Terre Haute, Indiana, United States (d. 1990)
  - Gorgeous George, American wrestler, known for patenting the flamboyant persona to wrestling; as George Raymond Wagner, in Butte, Nebraska, United States (d. 1963)
- Died:
  - Margaret Lindsay Huggins, 66, Irish astronomer, pioneered with husband astronomer William Huggins the field of spectroscopy and co-author of Atlas of Representative Stellar Spectra (b. 1848)
  - Mary Anna Jackson, 83, American matriarch, wife and widow to Confederate General Stonewall Jackson (b. 1831)

== March 25, 1915 (Thursday) ==
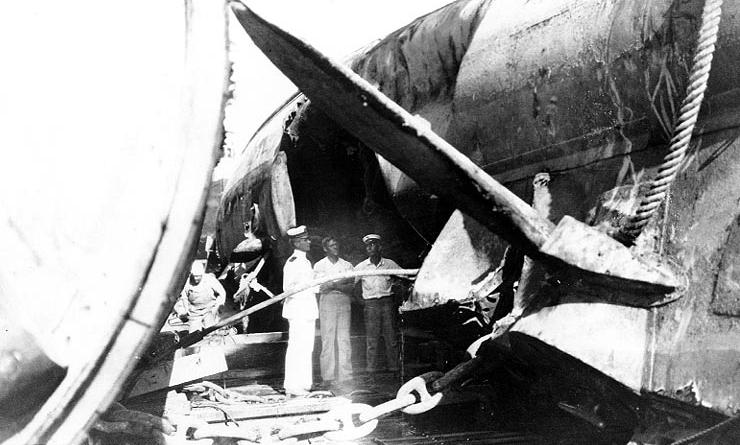
U.S. Navy inspection team examining the large implosion hole in the port side of submarine USS F-4 after it was raised and towed to Honolulu, August 1915.

- General elections were held in Japan, with the Rikken Dōshikai party winning the majority in the House of Representatives with 153 of the 381 seats.
- The U.S. submarine USS F-4 sank off Hawaii, killing all 21 sailors on board. It was the first commissioned submarine of the United States Navy to be lost at sea.
- The British cargo ship SS Tamar was shelled and sunk in the Atlantic Ocean 500 nautical miles (930 km) northeast of Pernambuco, Brazil by German warship SMS Kronprinz.
- The Royal Flying Corps established the No. 4 Squadron at Dover, England but was absorbed into the naval air force by October.
- The 111th, 113th, 119th and 121st Infantry Divisions of the Imperial German Army were established, and fought on both the Western and Eastern fronts.
- In a letter exchange between German and Ottoman ambassadors, it was reported the Armenian Zeitun militia resistance ended after Ottoman forces captured the city (now Süleymanlı).
- Ross Sea party — Sledge parties that laid out supply depots across Ross Ice Shelf in the Antarctic for the main party of the Imperial Trans-Antarctic Expedition rendezvoused at Hut Point Peninsula on Ross Island. While most of the depots had been laid out, teams of dogs had been lost, many of the men suffered from frostbite and exhaustion, and ice conditions made it impossible to return to the shore base in Cape Evans until June 1. As a result, morale of the men under command of Aeneas Mackintosh was low.
- The association football club Melgar was formed in Arequipa, Peru, and remains one of the oldest active Peruvian sports clubs in the Peruvian Primera División.
- Born:
  - Dorothy Squires, Welsh singer, best known for popular hits such as "I'm in the Mood for Love"; as Edna May Squires, in Pontyberem, Wales (d. 1998)
  - Anton Hackl, German air force officer, commander of the Jagdgeschwader 26, Jagdgeschwader 76, and Jagdgeschwader 11 for the Luftwaffe during World War II, recipient of the Knight's Cross of the Iron Cross; in Regensburg, German Empire (present-day Germany) (d. 1984)

== March 26, 1915 (Friday) ==
- Battle of Hartmannswillerkopf — After a three-hour bombardment, the French captured the Hartmannswillerkopf summit from the Germans. The French now had a key observation post for German military movements in the Alsace region between France and Germany.
- The third of the International Socialist Women's Conferences was held in Bern, Switzerland, following a seven-month delay from its original planned conference in Vienna for August 1914. The outbreak of war forced the conference to be relocated and wartime conditions allowed only 30 delegated to attend.
- The 21st, 22nd, 23rd, 24th, and 26th Battalions of the First Australian Imperial Force were established for the planned Gallipoli campaign.
- British passenger ship SS Viking was acquired by the Royal Navy and outfitted to become a seaplane carrier christened as HMS Vindex.
- A hearing held by the U.S. Steamboat Inspection Service on the collision between Oregon river boats Telegraph and Charm concluded evidence supported the collision being "largely in the nature of an accident."
- The Vancouver Millionaires won the Stanley Cup over the Ottawa Senators three games to zero.
- Thoroughbred racehorse Ally Sloper won the 77th renewal of the Grand National by two lengths at a price of 100/8 and in a time of 9 mins, 47.8 secs.
- Virginia Woolf published her first novel The Voyage Out through Gerald Duckworth and Company, which introduced her most famous character Clarissa Dalloway.
- The town of Miami Beach, Florida was established.

== March 27, 1915 (Saturday) ==
- British intelligence received a message that Germany had broken the code used to communicate between British merchant ships.
- Crawford Vaughan was elected Premier of South Australia, defeating incumbent Archibald Peake when his Labor Party captured 10 more seats than Peake's Liberal Union party.
- After infecting 25 people with typhoid fever at Sloane Hospital for Women in New York City while working under an assumed name, Mary Mallon, cited in the press as "Typhoid Mary," was placed in quarantine for life until her death in 1938.
- The Tennessee Polytechnic Institute was established in Cookeville, Tennessee. In 1965, it would gain university status and become Tennessee Technological University.
- Born: Robert Lockwood Jr., American blues musician, best known for being a direct pupil of Robert Johnson and his long-time collaborative work with Sonny Boy Williamson; in Turkey Scratch, Arkansas, United States (d. 2006)
- Died: Marty Walsh, 30, Canadian hockey player, won the Stanley Cup three times while playing with the Ottawa Senators; died from complications of tuberculosis (b. 1884)

== March 28, 1915 (Sunday) ==
- Thrasher incident — British ocean liner Falaba was sunk by torpedo in St George's Channel by German submarine U-28 with the loss of 104 lives. Those killed included US passenger Leon Chester Thrasher, a 31-year-old mining engineer from Massachusetts. This stirred public pressure in the United States to enter World War I, but the US Government confined itself to a diplomatic response.
- Captain Charles Fryatt of the British ferry Brussels ordered his ship to ram German submarine U-33 after it tried to stop and board her. The German submarine was forced to crash dive. The aggressive action was in full compliance orders issues by Winston Churchill, First Lord of the Admiralty to treat U-boats as felons rather than prisoners of war because of Imperial German Navy policy to wage unrestricted submarine warfare. For his actions, Fryatt was awarded a gold watch by the Admiralty.
- The first Catholic liturgy was celebrated by Archbishop John Ireland at the newly consecrated Cathedral of Saint Paul in Saint Paul, Minnesota.
- Italian rider Ezio Corlaita won the 9th Milan–San Remo bicycle race in a time of 10 hours, 36 minutes and 3 seconds, or a pace of 27.26 km/h.
- The Gestriklands Fotbollförbund (Gestrikland Football Association) was established in Gävle, Sweden as the governing body for association football in the Swedish province of Gästrikland. It currently has 46 member clubs.
- Several major all-male academic organizations in Estonia united under the League of Estonian Corporations "to strengthen the relationship between the organizations" and "to enhance its members' spiritual upbringing of Estonian history, language and literature through learning."

== March 29, 1915 (Monday) ==
- The Society of British Aircraft Constructors (Society of British Aerospace Companies since 1964) was established to create a standards body for aircraft built in Great Britain. Among the noted founding participants were Herbert Austin, Frederick Handley Page, H.V. Roe of Avro, and E.B. Parker of Short Brothers.
- The first suffrage meeting was held in Dublin, leading to the formation of the Irish Catholic Women's Suffrage Association in November.
- The Great Western Railway closed the rail station in Stourbridge, England as a wartime measure.
- Born: Kenneth Arnold, American pilot, famous for spotting nine UFOs near Mount Rainier, Washington in 1947; in Sebeka, Minnesota, United States (d. 1984)
- Died: William Wallace Denslow, 58, American artist, illustrator for many of L. Frank Baum's Oz series; died of pneumonia (b. 1856)

== March 30, 1915 (Tuesday) ==
- A German party of marines stranded after the SMS Emden was destroyed were escorted to Jeddah on the Arabian Peninsula with a party of Turkish and Arab guards. They were surprised by a party of Bedouin raiders and forced to fight, where two of the party were killed and third wounded before a relief force arrived to escort them to the city.
- Royal Navy minesweeper HMS Foxglove was launched at Barclay Curle in Glasgow, where it went on to serve in both world wars.
- The men's fraternity Sigma Gamma Epsilon was formed at University of Kansas for students involved in the earth sciences.
- The first edition of the weekly Canadian trade magazine The Northern Miner was published in Cobalt, Ontario, featuring news and articles on the Canadian mining industry, particularly in northern Ontario.
- Born: Arsenio Erico, Paraguayan association football player, all-time highest goalscorer in the Argentine Primera División, with 295 goals according to Argentine Football Association; as Arsenio Pastor Erico Martínez, in Asunción, Paraguay (d. 1977)

== March 31, 1915 (Wednesday) ==
- The Texas Legislature chartered the Department of Forestry to manage the American state's forests, now named the Texas A&M Forest Service.
- Born:
  - Robert C. Stebbins, American biologist known for his field guides to reptiles and amphibians; in Chico, California, United States (d. 2013)
  - Shoichi Yokoi, Japanese soldier, one of the last of the three Japanese holdouts after the end of World War II, found in Guam in 1972; in Saori, Aichi, Empire of Japan (present-day Japan) (d. 1997)
- Died: Wyndham Halswelle, 32, Scottish track athlete, gold medalist in the 1908 Summer Olympics; killed in action at the Battle of Neuve Chapelle in France (b. 1882)
