= Kumkale, Çanakkale =

Village in Turkey

Kumkale
- Village
- Location within Turkey Location within Marmara
- Coordinates: 39°58′51″N 26°14′5″E
- Country: Turkey
- Province: Çanakkale
- District: Çanakkale
- Population (2021): 1,016
- Time zone: UTC+3 (TRT)

Kumkale is a village in Çanakkale Province, Turkey. Its population is 1,016 (2021). Before the 2013 reorganisation, it was a town (belde).

== Geography ==
Kumkale is located within the National Park of Troy. (Troy is an ancient city included in the World Heritage Sites in Turkey.) Its distance to Çanakkale is 27 kilometres (17 mi).

== History ==
According to some historians this village might be the starting place of Alexander the Great's campaign in Anatolia against the Persian Empire in the 4th century BC.

Kumkale was a prosperous village before the First World War. But during the early phases of the Gallipoli Campaign, the village was evacuated because of French troops landing on the beach of the village. (See Battle of Kumkale.) After the war the village was not repopulated. However in 1928 some people began to settle in a location slightly to the east of the former village. The former name of this new village was Mısırlık, But then the name Kumkale came into use. When the Turkish minority in Bulgaria was expelled from Bulgaria a number of families were settled in Kumkale and the town was declared the seat of its township in 1992. However during the 2013 Turkish local government reorganisation its stature was changed to that of a village.

== Economy ==
The major economic activity of the settlement is agriculture. Tomatoes are the most important product. Cotton and sunflowers are also produced.
