= Battle of Kumkale =

1915 WWI battle of the Gallipoli campaign

Landing at Kumkale
- Part of the Gallipoli campaign
- Kum Kale at bottom left: Orographical map of the Dardanelles reduced from captured Ottoman maps
Date	25 April 1915
Location	Kumkale, Çanakkale, Ottoman Empire 39°58′50″N 26°14′13″E
Result	Inconclusive

Belligerents
France	Ottoman Empire

Commanders and leaders
Colonel Ruef	Lieutenant Colonel Nurettin Bey

Strength
1 regiment and one battalion	1 regiment

Casualties and losses
786 casualties	1,735 casualties
- Map of modern Turkey showing Kum Kale

The Battle of Kumkale was a World War I battle fought between Ottoman and French forces. It was a part of the Gallipoli Campaign fought on the Anatolian (Asian) part of the Dardanelles Strait as a diversion from the main landings on the Gallipoli peninsula (European side of the strait). Kumkale is the name of a village which now is a part of Troy national park.

== Kumkale during the naval campaign ==
On 17 February 1915, a British seaplane from HMS Ark Royal flew a reconnaissance sortie over the Straits. Two days later, the first attack on the Dardanelles began when a strong Anglo-French task force, including the British battleship HMS Queen Elizabeth, began a long-range bombardment of Ottoman artillery along the coast. A period of bad weather slowed the initial phase but by 25 February the outer forts had been reduced and the entrance cleared of mines. Royal Marines were landed to destroy guns at Kum Kale on the northern Asian coast and at Sedd el Bahr on the southern tip of the Gallipoli Peninsula, while the naval bombardment shifted to batteries between Kum Kale and Kephez.

On 18 March 1915, the main attack was launched, the fleet, comprising 18 battleships with a supporting array of cruisers and destroyers, sought to target the narrowest point of the Dardanelles, where the straits are 1 mile (1.6 km) wide. Despite some damage sustained by ships engaging the Ottoman forts, minesweepers were ordered to proceed along the straits. According to an account by the Ottoman General Staff, by 2:00 p.m. "all telephone wires were cut, all communications with the forts were interrupted, some of the guns had been knocked out ... in consequence the artillery fire of the defence had slackened considerably". The Bouvet was sunk by a mine, causing it to capsize with her crew of over 600 still aboard. Minesweepers manned by civilians, under the constant fire of Ottoman shells, retreated, leaving the minefields largely intact.

HMS Irresistible and HMS Inflexible were badly damaged by mines, although there was confusion during the battle about the cause of the damage, some blamed torpedoes. HMS Ocean, sent to rescue the Irresistible, was also damaged by an explosion, and both ships eventually sank. The French battleships Suffren and Gaulois were also damaged; the ships had sailed through a new line of mines placed secretly by the Ottoman minelayer Nusret ten days before. The losses forced de Robeck to sound the "general recall" to save what remained of his force. The defeat of the British fleet had given the Ottomans a morale boost and planning to capture the Turkish defences by land began.

== Prelude ==
=== Ottoman preparations ===
The Ottoman side was aware of the landing plans and the landing force which was waiting in the island of Lemnos. A new Ottoman army (5th Army) was established. The German general Liman von Sanders, the military advisor of the Ottoman headquarters (later the commander of the 5th Army) determined that the main landing would be made in the Anatolian side as well as in Bolayır, a narrow isthmus in the European side. So most of the 5th Army troops were situated in Anatolian side and in Bolayır. Although Mustafa Kemal, then the commander of the 19th Division saw the Gallipoli peninsula in the European side as the main landing area, he couldn't persuade the headquarters. Thus three Ottoman divisions of the 5th Army (3, 5 and 11) were situated in the Anatolian side of the strait.

=== Allied preparations ===
General Ian Hamilton, the commander of the Allied landing forces decided to land in two points, both in Gelibolu peninsula. But he also decided to make lesser landings in two places just as von Sanders anticipated. The purpose of these two lesser landings was to deceive the Ottoman side and delay any support to the Ottoman forces in the main landing sites. Another purpose of the Anatolian side campaign was to prevent the Ottoman Anatolian artillery to bombard the Allied troops in the Landing at Cape Helles (Seddülbahir) in Gelibolu peninsula. Hamilton commissioned the French troops for this task. However, there was disagreement about the exact location of the landing site. Albert d'Amade, commander of the French forces proposed a larger scale operation with landing in Edremit, situated far to the south. Hamilton however insisted on a landing closer to the strait. The commander of the landing forces was Colonel Ruef. He had the three battalions of the 6th Mixed Colonial Regiment (from the Corps expéditionnaire d'Orient) as well as a battalion and auxiliary units under his command. The naval forces which supported this regiment consisted of 3 cruisers and 9 destroyers. While HMS Prince George was tasked to bomb the artilleries at the Anatolian side of the strait, the French battleships supported the landing.

== Battle ==
=== Landing at Kumtepe ===
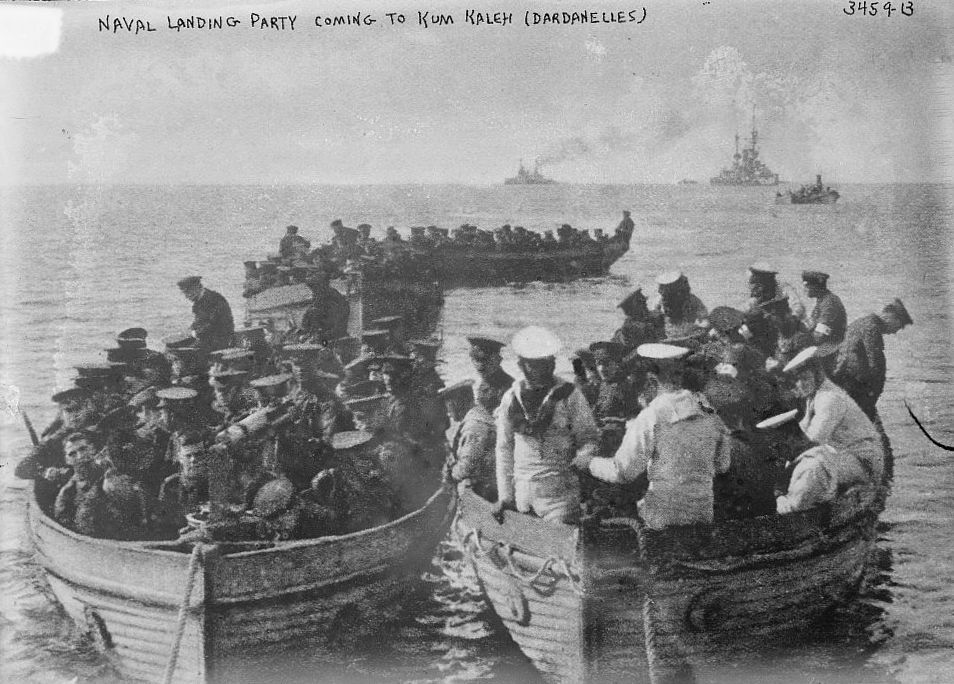
Naval landing party coming to Kumkale on 25 April 1915

The naval bombardment began at 5.15 on 25 April 1915 by the French battleships Jauréguiberry and Henri IV, the French armoured cruiser Jeanne d’Arc and the Russian cruiser Askold. The target of the bombardment was the village of Kumkale at 39°59′N 26°11′E. Kumkale is situated at the southern end of the Anatolian side of the strait. At 10.00 the first French troops (10th and 11th Senegalese companies) landed at Kumkale. In Kumkale there was only one Ottoman platoon. Towards the night the French regiment formed a bridgehead at Kumkale.

=== Clashes in Kumkale ===
Because of Beşige bombardment (see below), and fear of another landing in Beşige, another possible landing site to the south, most of the 11th Ottoman division was unable to deploy in Kumkale. But Lieutenant Colonel Nurettin Bey, the commander of the 39th Ottoman regiment, counterattacked two times during the night, which resulted in failure, mostly due to friendly fire. Towards the morning, 39th regiment finally defeated the French forces. The French side sued for surrender. However, during negotiations, which were hampered by the language barrier, the sun rose and the navy opened fire, resulting in heavy casualties on the Ottoman side. The Ottoman regiment withdrew to reorganise. On the other hand, after the French withdrawal from Beşige, 11th division also prepared to attack. Hamilton ordered retreat from Anatolian positions and on the night of 26/27 April, Kumkuyu was evacuated by the French forces.

=== Beşige/Besika Bay ===
On the night of 25/26 April, six French troop transports, with two destroyers and a torpedo boat, appeared off Besika Bay (now Beşik Bay, Çanakkale), about 10 kilometres (6.2 mi) south of Kumkale. The warships commenced a bombardment and boats were lowered from the transports, to simulate a disembarkation. At 8:30 a.m., the cruiser Jeanne d'Arc arrived and joined in the bombardment, before the force was recalled to Bozcaada at 10:00 a.m.

== Aftermath ==
=== Analysis ===
The Ottoman garrison was detained in the area until 27 April, although the Turkish Official Account recorded that the landings at Kum Kale and the demonstration at Besika Bay had been recognised as ruses. Transfers of troops from the Asiatic shore was delayed by lack of boats and the fear of Allied submarines, rather than apprehension about landings on the Asiatic side. It was not until 29 April, that troops from the area appeared on the Helles front. After the landings, the Ottoman commander, General Weber Pasha was criticised for being caught unprepared, poor tactics, failures of communication and leadership, although the flat terrain had made accurate bombardment from offshore much easier.

=== Casualties ===
Casualties of the Ottoman side (including missing) were 1,735 men and French casualties were 786.
