= Renwick Generating Plant =

- U.S. National Register of Historic Places
- U.S. Historic district
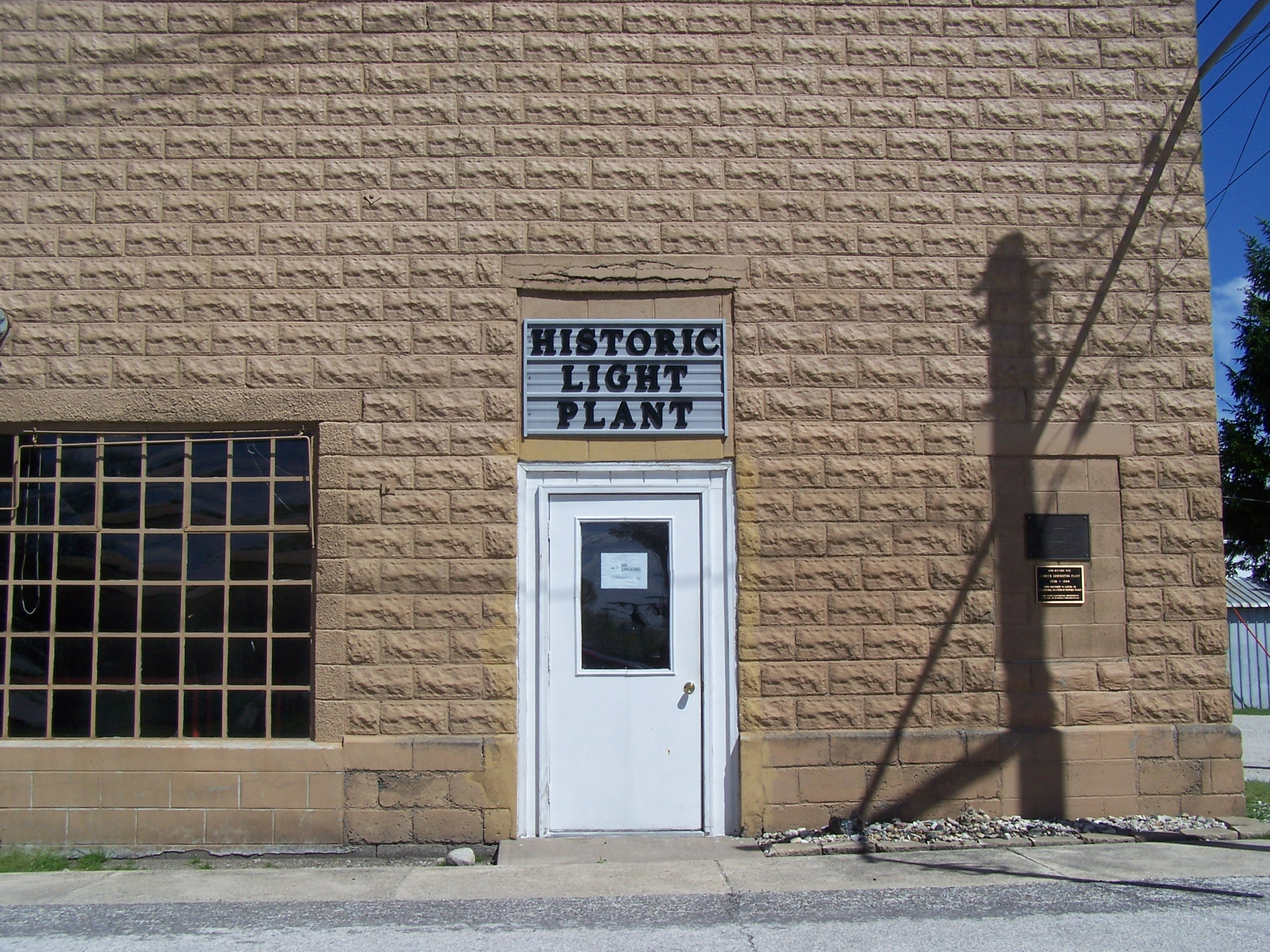

- Location within Iowa Location within the United States
- Location: 103 N. Field St. Renwick, Iowa
- Coordinates: 42°49′43″N 93°58′42″W
- Area: less than one acre
- Built: 1915
- Architect: G.L. Long
- NRHP reference No.: 95000099
- Added to NRHP: February 17, 1995

Renwick Generating Plant, also known as the Municipal Steam Light Plant, is a historical industrial facility located in Renwick, Iowa, United States. G.L. Long was an engineer who was contracted in 1914 to design a steam-powered electrical light plant. It first distributed energy on March 14, 1915, at 6:00 p.m. The steam engines were replaced by a 75-horsepower, two-cylinder, semi-diesel engine and generating equipment manufactured by Fairbanks-Morse in 1922. A 125-horsepower diesel engine manufactured by Worthington Pump and Machinery Corporation was added in 1936. At that time the plant started to supply power to a newly formed rural electric cooperative that was funded by the Rural Electrification Act of 1936. A Faribanks-Morse 300-horsepower, four-cylinder diesel was added in 1939, and the 75-horsepower and 40-horsepower engines were replaced in 1942 by another 300-horsepower diesel. An addition was added onto the north side of the building the same year. It housed the local fire department and city hall. The facility was listed as a historic district on the National Register of Historic Places in 1995.

The plant is a single-story, rectangular building that was built of concrete block manufactured in Renwick. It is a contributing building in the historic district. Contributing structures include the three engines, a transformer substation bank, a cooling tower, a water tower, and a utility shed.
