= Asheville Masonic Temple =

- U.S. Historic district – Contributing property
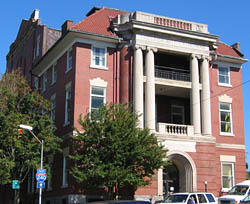

- Location within North Carolina
- Map showing the location of Asheville Masonic Temple
- Location: 80 Broadway, Asheville, North Carolina
- Coordinates: 35.598106°N 82.552435°W
- Built: 1913
- Architect: Smith and Carrier
- Part of: Downtown Asheville Historic District (ID79001676)
- MPS: Asheville Historic and Architectural MRA
- Designated CP: April 26, 1979

The Asheville Masonic Temple is a Masonic Temple located in Asheville, North Carolina. Designed by British American architect and Freemason Richard Sharp Smith, the building was opened in April 1915. It is listed in the United States National Register of Historic Places as a contributing building in the Downtown Asheville Historic District.

It is a four-story pressed brick building with limestone and grey brick trim, upon a granite foundation. It has a red tile hipped roof above its front portion. The Broadway facade has a two-story portico with paired Ionic columns.

== History ==
Architect Smith was originally from England and was working in New York City for Richard Morris Hunt who hired him to supervise the construction of the Biltmore House.

On July 1, 1909, Mount Hermon Lodge No. 118 and the Royal Arch Masons Asheville Chapter, jointly purchased the lot at 80 Broadway in Asheville on which the Asheville Masonic Temple currently stands. In April 1912 a meeting was held between Mount Hermon Lodge #118 and the Scottish Rite Valley of Asheville's Lodge of Perfection to devise a plan for the building of a new Masonic Temple.

The plan was to organize a building company composed of members of both bodies. It was suggested that the basement and first floor would include a reading room, library, secretaries’ offices, lobby, banquet hall, and a kitchen. The second floor would be used by Mount Hermon Lodge and other appendant bodies, such as the Order of the Eastern Star and the York Rite. The third and fourth floors were to be used by the Valley Of Asheville Scottish Rite. In May 1913 a contract was signed with McPherson Construction Company to construct the building for a price of $56,260. Almost two years later, on April 29, 1915, the Masonic Temple Company accepted the building from the contractor. The original plans, deeds and survey plats are still among the Temple's records.

== Notable members ==
There have been several prominent Masons whose Masonic careers originated from the Asheville Masonic Temple.

- Robert Brank Vance was Master of Mount Hermon Lodge #118 in 1866, 1867 and 1873, and Grand Master of Masons of North Carolina in 1868 and 1869.

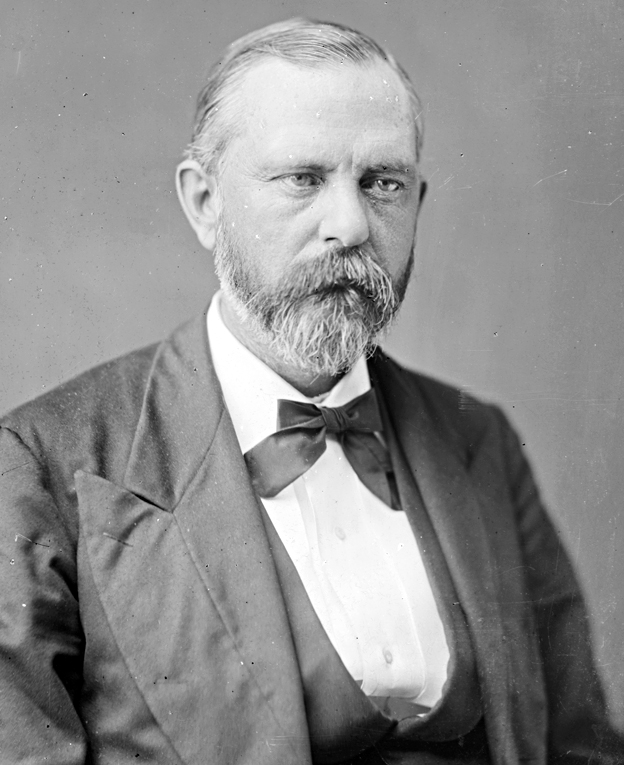
Robert Brank Vance, N.C. Grand Master in 1868 and 1869.

- Zebulon Baird Vance was a member of Mount Hermon Lodge #118. On February 4, 1853, at the age of 23, Vance petitioned Mt. Hermon Lodge #118 in Asheville. He received both the Second and Third Degrees on June 20, 1853. Vance was the 37th and 43rd Governor of North Carolina.

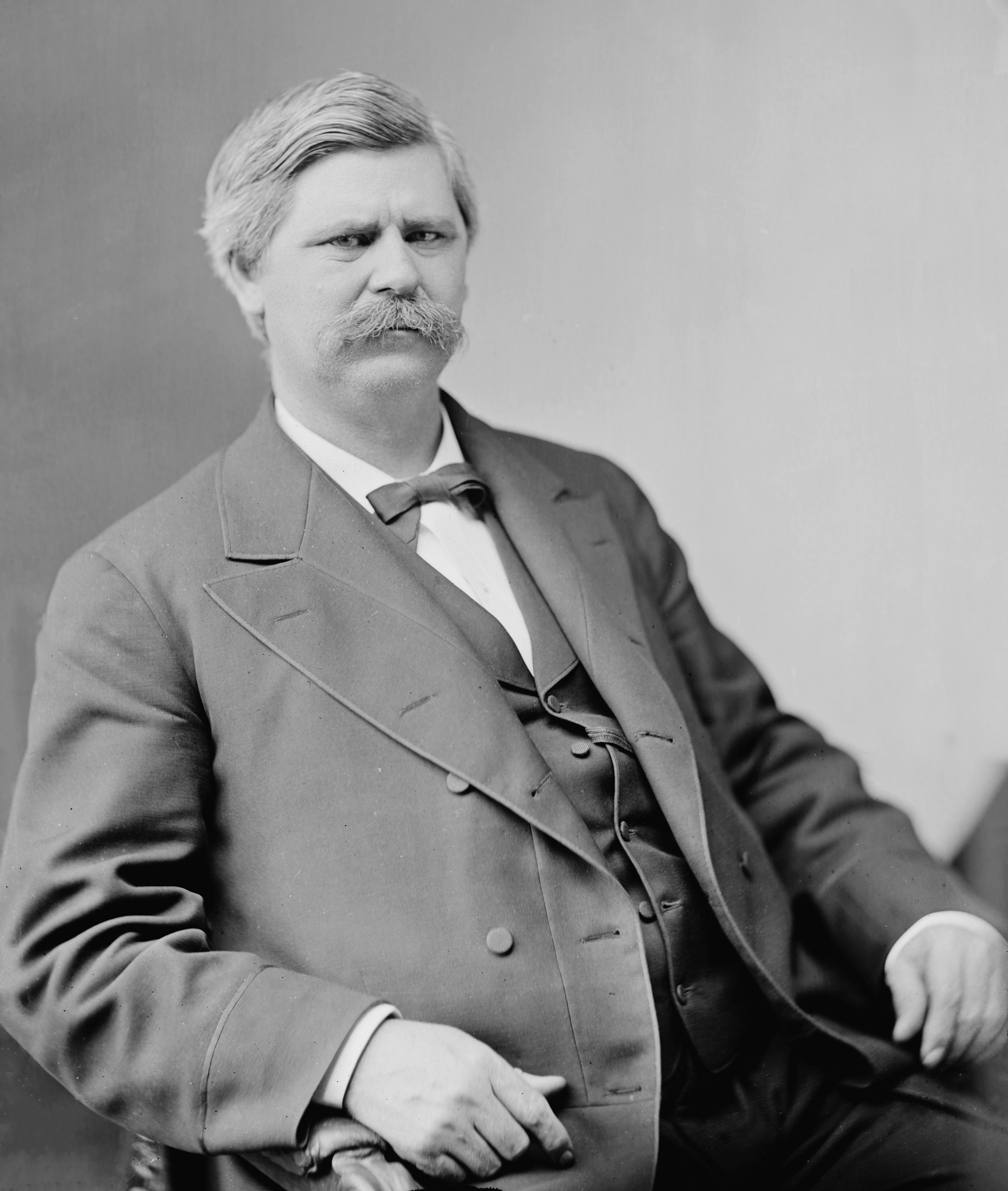
Zebulon Baird Vance, 37th and 43rd Governor of N.C.

- Norburn Creighton Hyatt was Master of Mount Hermon #118 in 1969, and Grand Master of Masons of North Carolina in 1985.

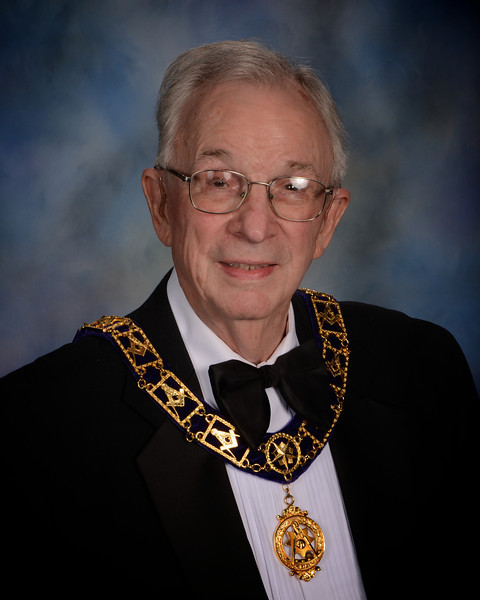
Norburn Creighton Hyatt, N.C. Grand Master in 1985.
