= J.B. Greenhut & Company =

J.B. Greenhut & Company was a Manhattan business which operated two department stores. It became bankrupt in 1915. The firm maintained property located at 6th Avenue and 17th Street, prior to its failure. The company faced depreciation of its property in the lower 6th Avenue section and a mortgage debt of $3,200,000. One of the primary reasons for the insolvency of J.B. Greenhut & Company was its operation of a private financial institution, the Greenhut bank, which experienced a crippling bank run.

== Bankruptcy proceedings ==
The corporation was placed in receivership after an equity suit was instituted against it by the Monmouth Securities Company, a New Jersey holding company. The assets of J.B. Greenhut & Company amounted to $18,179,964 and its liabilities were a total of $12,703,364. The business's largest creditor was William Waldorf Astor, the lessor of the real estate on which J.B. Greenhut & Company's primary building was located. The lease was due to expire in 1925 and amounted to $562,069 (~$7.78 million in 2023). Two subsidiaries of the business, the Joseph Benedict Company and the Manhattan Laboratories Company, were named co-defendants in the equity suit on April 13, 1915. On April 28, 1915 Judge Learned Hand ruled J.B. Greenhut & Company bankrupt in United States District Court.
