= June 1915 =

Month of 1915

<<	June 1915					>>
Su	Mo	Tu	We	Th	Fr	Sa
		1	2	3	4	5
6	7	8	9	10	11	12
13	14	15	16	17	18	19
20	21	22	23	24	25	26
27	28	29	30

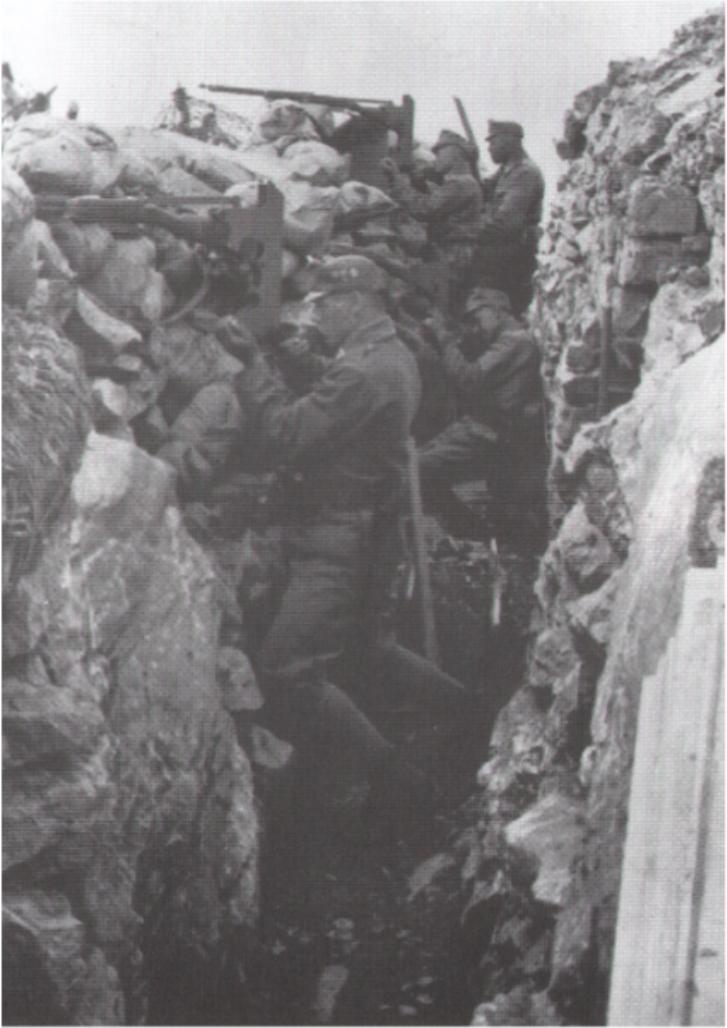
Austro-Hungarian troops defend against an Italian attack during the First Battle of the Isonzo.

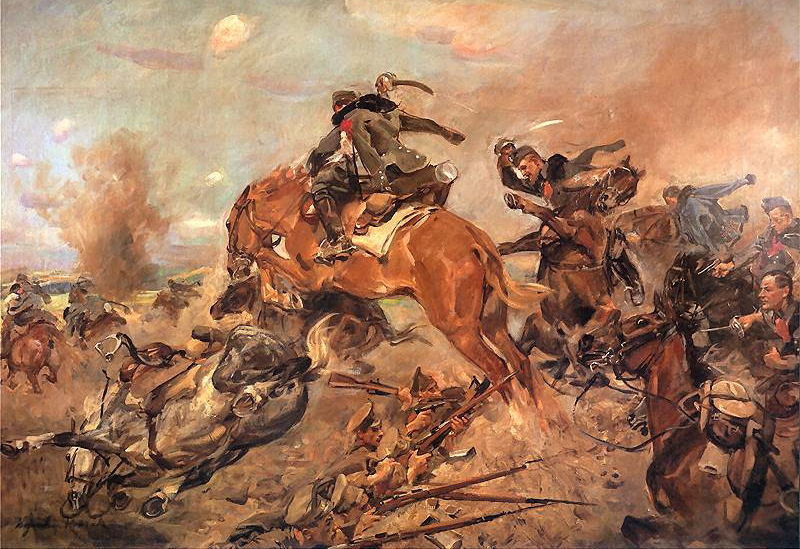
Polish cavalry charge Russian troops at Rokytne, Austria-Hungary.

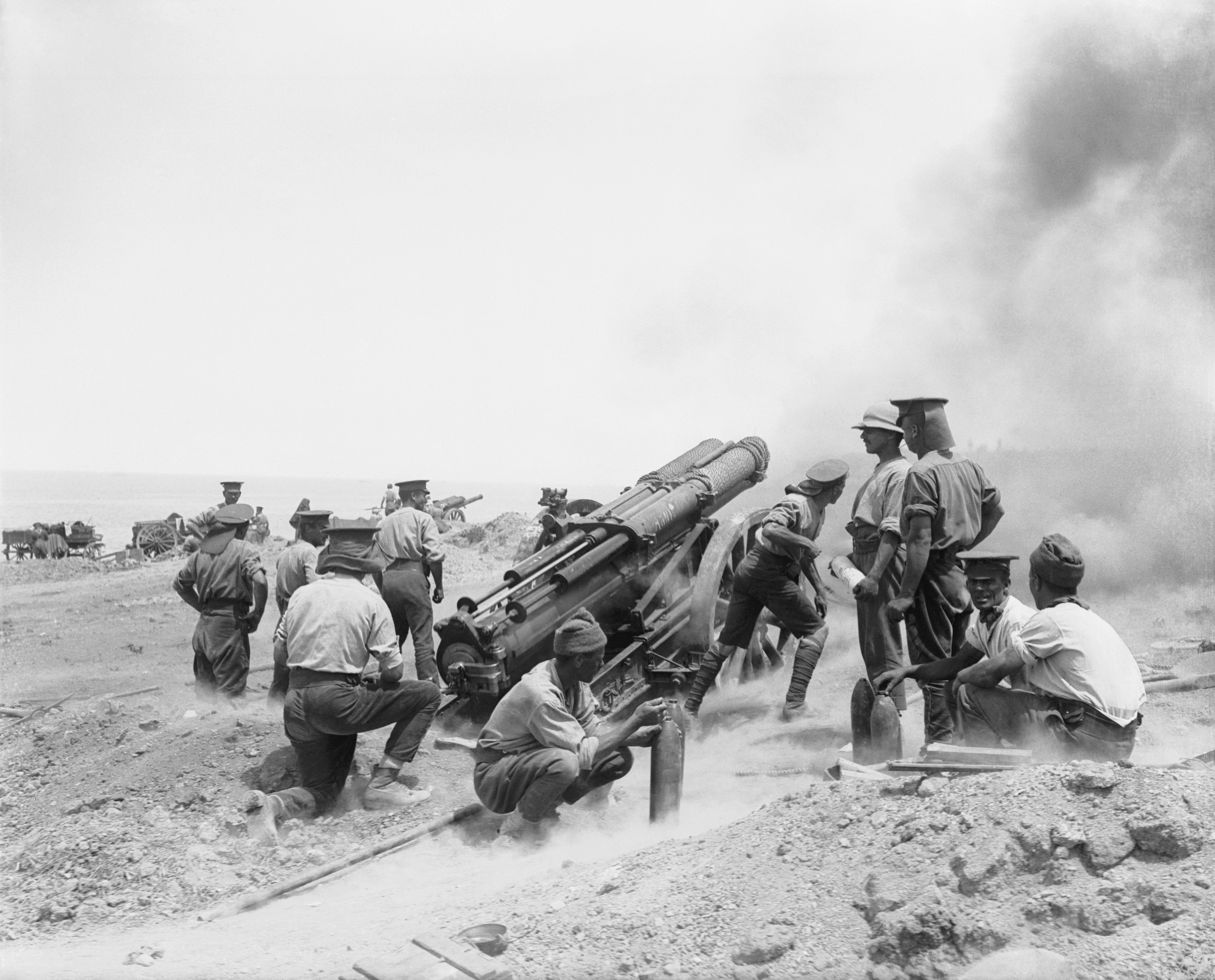
British artillery barrage Turkish positions during the Third Battle of Krithia.

The following events occurred in June 1915:

== June 1, 1915 (Tuesday) ==
- Gorlice–Tarnów Offensive — German infantry occupied three large forts around Przemyśl after a Russian counterattack failed.
- British light cruiser HMS Arethusa encountered a German airship on the North Sea and quickly launched a Sopwith seaplane to intercept. However, the pilot mistook smoke from British destroyers as a recall signal and abandoned the chase, ending one of the most promising early opportunities for the interception of an airship by a shipborne aircraft.
- The 107th Infantry Division of the Imperial German Army was established.
- The United States Department of the Navy awarded its first contract for an airship to the Connecticut Aircraft Company.
- Shinano Railway extended the Ōito Line in the Nagano Prefecture, Japan, with station Hakuyachō serving the line. As well, the Geibi Railway extended the Geibi Line in the Okayama Prefecture, Japan, with station Miyoshi serving the line.
- The second part of the Mandra–Bhaun Railway opened in British India (now Pakistan), connecting Mandra with Bhaun.
- The Sunset Beach Hotel opened in Glenwood Township, Pope County, Minnesota. It was added to the National Register of Historic Places in 1982.

== June 2, 1915 (Wednesday) ==
- Second Battle of Artois — The French bombarded German defenses around Neuville-Saint-Vaast, France for three days before launching an attack.
- Shabin-Karahisar uprising — An Armenian militia of 250 began a month-long resistance against the Ottoman Empire in response to the Armenian genocide using a fort in the Giresun Province of Turkey.
- Ceylon Governor Robert Chalmers declared martial law in the colony (now Sri Lanka) after violent unrest between Muslim and Buddhist broke out in Kandy and spread to other towns and cities.
- The Imperial German Army established the 83rd and 84th Infantry Divisions.
- Born:
  - Walter Tetley, American voice actor, best known as the voice of "Sherman" in the TV cartoon Mr. Peabody; as Walter Campbell Tetzlaff, in New York City, United States (d. 1975)
  - Lester del Rey, American science fiction writer and publisher, editor with wife Judy-Lynn del Rey of Del Rey Books; as Leonard Knapp, in Saratoga Township, Winona County, Minnesota, United States (d. 1993)
  - Li Lili, Chinese actress, known for film roles in Little Toys and The Big Road; as Qian Zhenzhen, in Beijing, Republic of China (present-day China) (d. 2005)
- Died:
  - George Randell, 84, Australian politician, Member of the Western Australian Legislative Council from 1873 to 1875 and 1880 to 1890 (b. 1830)
  - Dave Orr, 55, American baseball player, first baseman for various teams including the New York Metropolitans and the Brooklyn Bridegrooms from 1883 to 1890 (b. 1859)

== June 3, 1915 (Thursday) ==
- Gorlice–Tarnów Offensive — The Fourth and Seventh armies of Austria-Hungary struck the flank of the Russian Eleventh Army and drove them back to the River Dniester.
- Mexican Revolution — Troops of Álvaro Obregón and Pancho Villa clashed at León, Guanajuato in Mexico. Obregón lost his right arm in a grenade attack but Villa was decisively defeated.
- Battle of Amara – The British Indian Army defeated Ottoman forces on the Tigris between the towns of Amara and Qurna, Mesopotamia (now Iraq), inflicting 120 casualties and capturing over 1,700 prisoners.
- The Imperial German Army established the 5th Ersatz Division.
- The first match of the New Zealand West Coast Rugby League team was held in Victoria Park, Greymouth, New Zealand against Canterbury.
- Born: Milton Cato, Saint Vincentian state leader, first Prime Minister of Saint Vincent and the Grenadines, on British Windward Islands; as Robert Milton Cato, in Saint Vincent, British Windward Islands (d. 1997)

== June 4, 1915 (Friday) ==
- Third Battle of Krithia — British, French, and Indian forces made a third and last attempt to capture Achi Baba, the main position for Ottoman defenses on the Gallipoli peninsula but were beaten back, sustaining some 6,500 casualties. Ottoman casualties were higher, ranging between 9,000 and 10,000 men.
- The LZ 40, the first Zeppelin P Class airship of the Imperial German Navy, was flown to bomb targets in London.
- The Royal Norwegian Navy Air Service test flew the M.F.1 floatplane in Horten, Norway, the first Marinens Flyvebaatfabrikk model based on a design by Maurice Farman.
- The fraternity Alpha Sigma Nu was founded at Marquette University as an honor society for Jesuit colleges.
- Born:
  - Modibo Keïta, Malian statesman, first President of Mali; in Bamako Coura, French Sudan (present-day Bamako, Mali) (d. 1977)
  - Walter Hadlee, New Zealand cricketer, batman for the New Zealand national cricket team from 1937 to 1951; in Lincoln, New Zealand (d. 2006)

== June 5, 1915 (Saturday) ==
British submarine HMS E11 returning from the Dardanelles after successfully infiltrating and attacking Turkish ships at Istanbul.

- Women's suffrage was introduced in Denmark and Iceland.
- Gorlice–Tarnów Offensive — German forces recaptured the Austro-Hungarian fortress Przemyśl from the Russians on the Eastern Front after a three-week siege.
- Third Battle of Krithia — Ottoman forces counter-attacked after the Allies failed to capture Achi Baba on the Gallipoli peninsula and drive them back to the sea. The attack nearly broke British defenses, but British officer Lieutenant George Moor managed to rally retreating troops and order them to retake a critical lost trench. The action motivated the rest of the force to stand their ground, subsequently Moore was awarded the Victoria Cross for his actions.
- German submarine SM U-14 was shelled and sunk in the North Sea by Royal Navy ship HMT Oceanic II with the loss of one of her 28 crew.
- French destroyer Fantassin was accidentally rammed and damaged in the Ionian Sea by Mameluck. She was consequently scuttled by Fauconneau.
- British submarine HMS E11 slipped past the Dardanelles again and returned to Allied water, after a successful mission that infiltrated Istanbul and the sinking of 11 ships over a three-week period. Submarine commander Martin Dunbar-Nasmith was awarded a Victoria Cross for the mission.
- The prototype of the Sigrist Bus airplane by the Sopwith Aviation Company was given a test flight and achieved a new altitude record. The model was then used to develop the 1½ Strutter biplane which became available by mid-December.
- Died:
  - Henri Gaudier-Brzeska, 23, French artist and sculptor, member of the Vorticism movement; killed in action at Neuville-Saint-Vaast (b. 1891)
  - John C. Rice, 58, American actor, best known for performing the first onscreen kiss with May Irwin in 1896 for the Thomas Edison film The Kiss; died of Bright's disease (b. 1857)

== June 6, 1915 (Sunday) ==
- Third Battle of Krithia — British general Aylmer Hunter-Weston managed to reorganize the Allied forces into an effective defense on the coast of Gallipoli and beat back the Ottoman defense, inflicting 3,000 casualties and forcing a stalemate.
- Second Battle of Artois — The French captured the main road leading to Neuville-Saint-Vaast, France.
- British carrier SS Immingham was lost in the Mediterranean Sea.
- Switzerland held a referendum on a war tax with most voters, over 450,000 (94 percent of electorate), in favor on implementing the one-off tax and over 27,000 against (about 6 percent). It was the first time a referendum has passed in every Swiss canton.
- The BHP Newcastle Steelworks opened in Newcastle, New South Wales, Australia.
- The London Underground extended the Bakerloo line with a new tube station at Maida Vale.
- The Icelandic sports club Þór Akureyri was established, and now encompasses teams for association football, basketball, handball and taekwondo.

== June 7, 1915 (Monday) ==
- Battle of Hébuterne — The French 2nd Army attacked German positions around Hébuterne, France to support the 10th Army efforts further north at Artois. French troops were able to overrun the first two German lines during the opening day.
- The Dardanelles Committee met in London decided to reinforce the Mediterranean Expeditionary Force of General Ian Hamilton with three divisions from Kitchener's Army in an attempt to reinvigorate the Gallipoli campaign.
- The first German Army Zeppelin airship was destroyed in air-to-air combat by British pilot Reginald Warneford of No. 1 Squadron over Ghent, Belgium. The airship crashed in Sint-Amandsberg, Belgium, killing one person on the ground and all but one of the crew. Warneford received the Victoria Cross for the action.
- The LZ 38, the first Zeppelin P Class airship of the Imperial German Army, was destroyed when British planes bombed the shed it was housed in near Evere, Belgium.
- The first airship flew out of Friedrichshafen-Löwental airfield near Friedrichshafen, Germany.
- Born:
  - Dominic Bruce, British air force officer, member of the No. 9 and No. 214 Squadrons during World War II, noted escapee from German POW camp Oflag IV-C at Colditz Castle, recipient of the Order of the British Empire, Order of St. Gregory the Great, Military Cross, and Air Force Medal; in Hebburn, England (d. 2000)
  - Graham Ingels, American comic book artist, best known for his work for EC Comics; in Cincinnati, United States (d. 1991)
- Died: Charles Reed Bishop, 93, American businessman and philanthropist in Hawaii, founder of the Kamehameha Schools and First Hawaiian Bank (b. 1822)

== June 8, 1915 (Tuesday) ==
- Battle of Hébuterne — The Germans regrouped to slow the French advance and recaptured their second line by the end of the day.
- Born:
  - Kayyar Kinhanna Rai, Indian poet, known for his poems and activism work for an independent India; in Kayyar, British India (present-day India) (d. 2015)
  - Ruth Stone, American poet, recipient of 2002 National Book Award and 2002 Wallace Stevens Award for the poetry collection In the Galaxy; in Roanoke, Virginia, United States (d. 2011)

== June 9, 1915 (Wednesday) ==
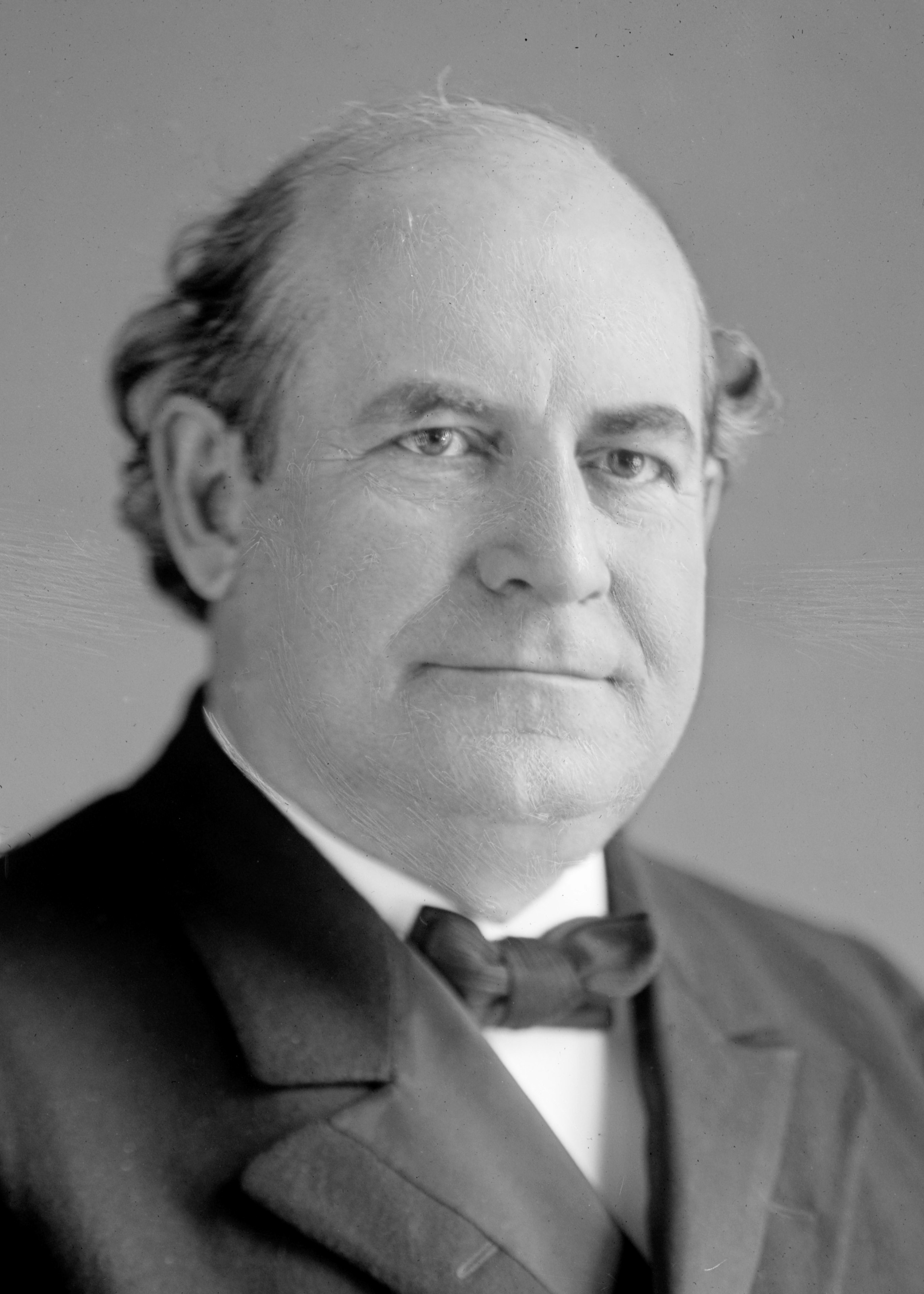
U.S. Secretary of State William Jennings Bryan

- Battle of Hébuterne — French attacks on the southern flanks became disorganized, with one German patrol able to take 100 French prisoners.
- U.S. President Woodrow Wilson sent Germany the second of three letters related to the sinking of the RMS Lusitania in May, rejecting Germany's argument the British blockade was illegal and that the Lusitania was carrying munitions.
- United States Secretary of State William Jennings Bryan resigned over disagreement regarding his nation's handling of the RMS Lusitania sinking.
- Second Battle of Garua — After nearly 10 days of siege from British and French forces, close to half of the native colonial troops under German command in forts around Garua, German Cameroon began to mutiny or desert their posts.
- British colonial force cracked down on rioters in Ceylon, resulting in 116 dead.
- British cruiser HMS Dublin was torpedoed and damaged in the Adriatic Sea off Albania by Austro-Hungarian submarine SM U-4 with the loss of 12 of her 440 crew. HMS Dublin was subsequently repaired and returned to service.
- The Georgia Prison Commission denied an application to commute the death sentence of Leo Frank in a 2–1 vote, who was convinced in 1913 for the murder of 13-year old Mary Phagan.
- British naval forces occupied the island of Kamaran in the Red Sea off the coast what is now Yemen.
- The French Army established the Marine Infantry Tank Regiment.
- Born: Les Paul, American musician, inventor of the solid body electric guitar; as Lester William Polsfuss, in Waukesha, Wisconsin, United States (d. 2009)

== June 10, 1915 (Thursday) ==
- Francisco Lagos Cházaro became acting president of Mexico under convention of the Convention of Aguascalientes.
- Battle of Hébuterne — The French secured more trenches from the Germans on the southern flank.
- Second Battle of Garua — The remaining 249 German and native troops stationed in garrisons around Garua, Kamerun surrendered to British and French forces.
- British seaplane carrier HMS Ben-my-Chree arrived at Lesbos to provide a full squadron of fighter planes and bombers for the Allied landing forces at Gallipoli.
- Royal Navy torpedo boats HMS TB 10 and HMS TB 12 both struck mines in the North Sea, with a total 45 men lost.
- Filmmakers Edwin S. Porter and William E. Waddell tested the first 3D film to an audience at the Astor Theatre in New York City.
- The only Vorticist exhibition ever staged opened at the Doré Gallery in London.
- The popular Italian sports magazine Hurrà Juventus was first published for players and fans of the Juventus association football club in Turin.
- Born:
  - Saul Bellow, Canadian-American writer, recipient of the Nobel Prize in Literature; as Solomon Bellows, in Lachine, Quebec, Canada (d. 2005)
  - Inia Te Wiata, New Zealand Māori opera singer, known for his performances in The Marriage of Figaro, La bohème, Billy Budd and Gloriana; as Inia Morehu Tauhia Watene Iarahi Waihurihia Te Wiata, in Ōtaki, New Zealand (d. 1971)
- Died: William Hayman Cummings, 83, English organist and singer, founder of the Purcell Society and credited for creating the melody known today for the Christmas carol "Hark! The Herald Angels Sing" (b. 1831)

== June 11, 1915 (Friday) ==
- Second Battle of Artois — Despite the Germans inflicting major casualties, French advanced 500 metres (550 yd) on a 300-metre (330 yd) front towards Neuville-Saint-Vaast, France.
- Battle of Hébuterne — The German launched the first of two counterattacks, with the first failing to dislodge the French.
- Second Battle of Garua — British and French forces formally took control of all garrisons around Garua, German Cameroon.
- Friar Leonard Melki and hundreds of other Christians are driven out of Mardin and massacred by Ottoman troops.
- Born: Magda Gabor, Hungarian actress, eldest sister of the Gabor sisters which included Eva and Zsa Zsa; as Magdolna Gábor, in Budapest, Austria-Hungary (present-day Hungary) (d. 1997)

== June 12, 1915 (Saturday) ==
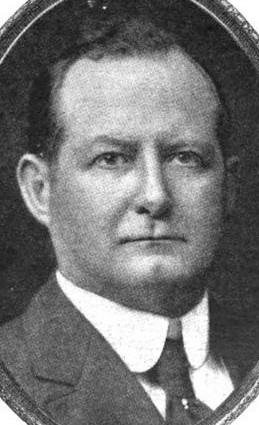
Georgia Governor John M. Slaton

- Battle of Hébuterne — A second German counterattack was also repulsed by the French.
- British tanker Desabla was torpedoed, shelled, and sunk in the North Sea by German submarine SM U-17.
- Georgia Governor John M. Slaton opened hearings on the Leo Frank case in which he accepted both trial and new evidence, which included over 10,000 pages of documents and visits to the crime scene. When the hearing wrapped, Stanton produced a 29-page report that concluded there was sufficient new evidence not available at the original trial that cast doubt on Frank's guilt and ordered the death sentence to be commuted to life imprisonment.
- The University of Georgia established a school for journalism, now known as the Henry W. Grady College of Journalism and Mass Communication.
- Tennis pro Molla Mallory won the women's singles at the U.S. National Championships, beating Hazel Hotchkiss Wightman 4–6, 6–2, 6–0.
- American writer Alice Duer Miller released her satirical poetry collection Are Women People? in hardcover by the George H. Dorman company, following a weekly run through the newspaper New-York Tribune.
- Born:
  - David Rockefeller, American banker, chairman of the Chase Manhattan Bank from 1969 to 1981, member of the Rockefeller family; in New York City, United States (d. 2017)
  - Priscilla Lane, American actress and singer, best known for lead roles in The Roaring Twenties, Saboteur, and Arsenic and Old Lace; as Priscilla Mullican, in Indianola, Iowa, United States (d. 1995)
  - Barbara Leonard Reynolds, American activist, co-owner with husband Earle L. Reynolds of the Phoenix of Hiroshima, a protest ship against nuclear arms; as Barbara Dorrit Leonard, in Milwaukee, United States (d. 1990)

== June 13, 1915 (Sunday) ==
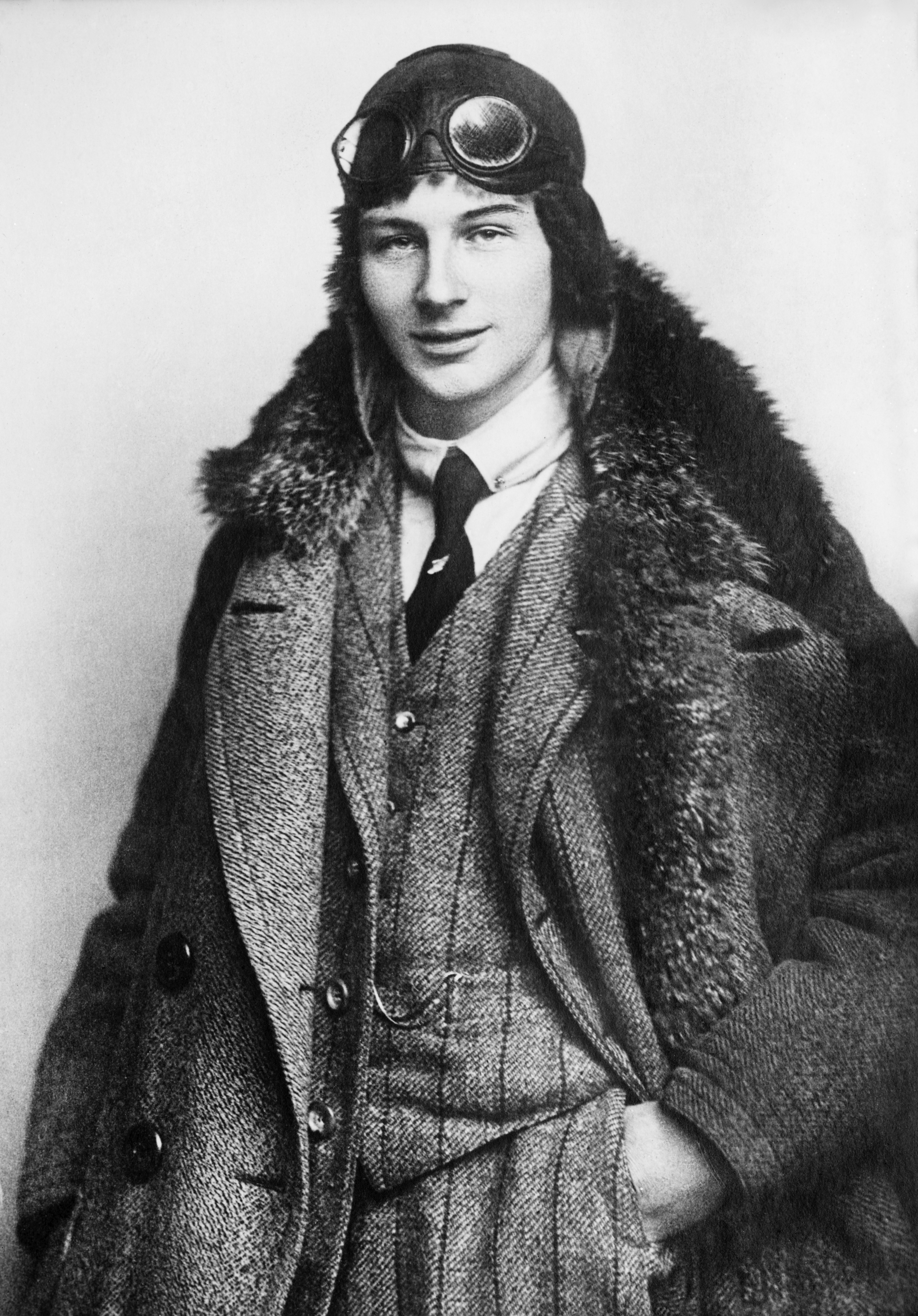
Dutch aviator Anthony Fokker.

German war ace Otto Parschau.

- Gorlice–Tarnów Offensive — The Central Powers attacked Lemberg, the Galician capital and sent the Russians into a headlong retreat.
- Second Battle of Artois — French forces under command of General Victor d'Urbal launched renewed artillery bombardments and infantry assaults against the German line on the Western Front south of German-held Souchez, France.
- Battle of Hébuterne — The battle concluded with the French holding on to their line, but at a cost of over 10,000 casualties. The Germans lost around 4,000 including 651 prisoners.
- Charge of Rokitna — A cavalry squadron of 70 men led by Rittmeister Zbigniew Dunin-Wasowicz with the 2nd Polish Brigade charged Imperial Russian Army positions at the village of Rokytne in the Austrian-Hungarian province of Bukovina (now part of Ukraine). The charge broke through three lines of Russian trenches, but resulted in 40 casualties among the squadron including the commanding officer. The Austro-Hungarian infantry failed to capitalize on the break.
- Greece held legislative elections under the Old Style calendar, with Eleftherios Venizelos and his Liberal Party winning by a landslide, gaining 187 of the 316 seats in the Greek Parliament.
- Legislative elections were held in Portugal, with the Democratic Party winning 106 of the 163 seats in the House of Representatives and 45 of the 69 seats in the Senate.
- General elections were held in San Marino to elect the fourth Grand and General Council.
- Dutch air craft designer Anthony Fokker and German pilot Otto Parschau demonstrated the E.II model of the Fokker Eindecker fighters to the German military command, including Crown Prince Wilhelm at Stenay, France. The command recognized the advantage the fighters would have in air combat, and used several Fokker aircraft over 1915 including the E.I, E.II, E.III, E.IV, and K.I models.
- Okaloosa County, Florida was established, with its county seat in Crestview.
- Born: Don Budge, American tennis player, World No. 1 champion from 1937 to 1941; as John Donald Budge, in Oakland, California, United States (d. 2000)
- Died: Nabeshima Naoyoshi, 71, Japanese noble, 13th and final daimyo (lord) of Kashima Domain in Hizen Province, Kyushu, Japan, first governor of the Okinawa Prefecture (b. 1844)

== June 14, 1915 (Monday) ==
- Second Battle of Artois — Despite advances by French forces on the southern flank of the front towards Souchez, France, it was discovered Germans had put up barbed wire in front of the entire front line, making it difficult for French soldiers to break through.
- The Clallam County Courthouse was officially dedicated to replace an older courthouse in Port Angeles, Washington.

== June 15, 1915 (Tuesday) ==
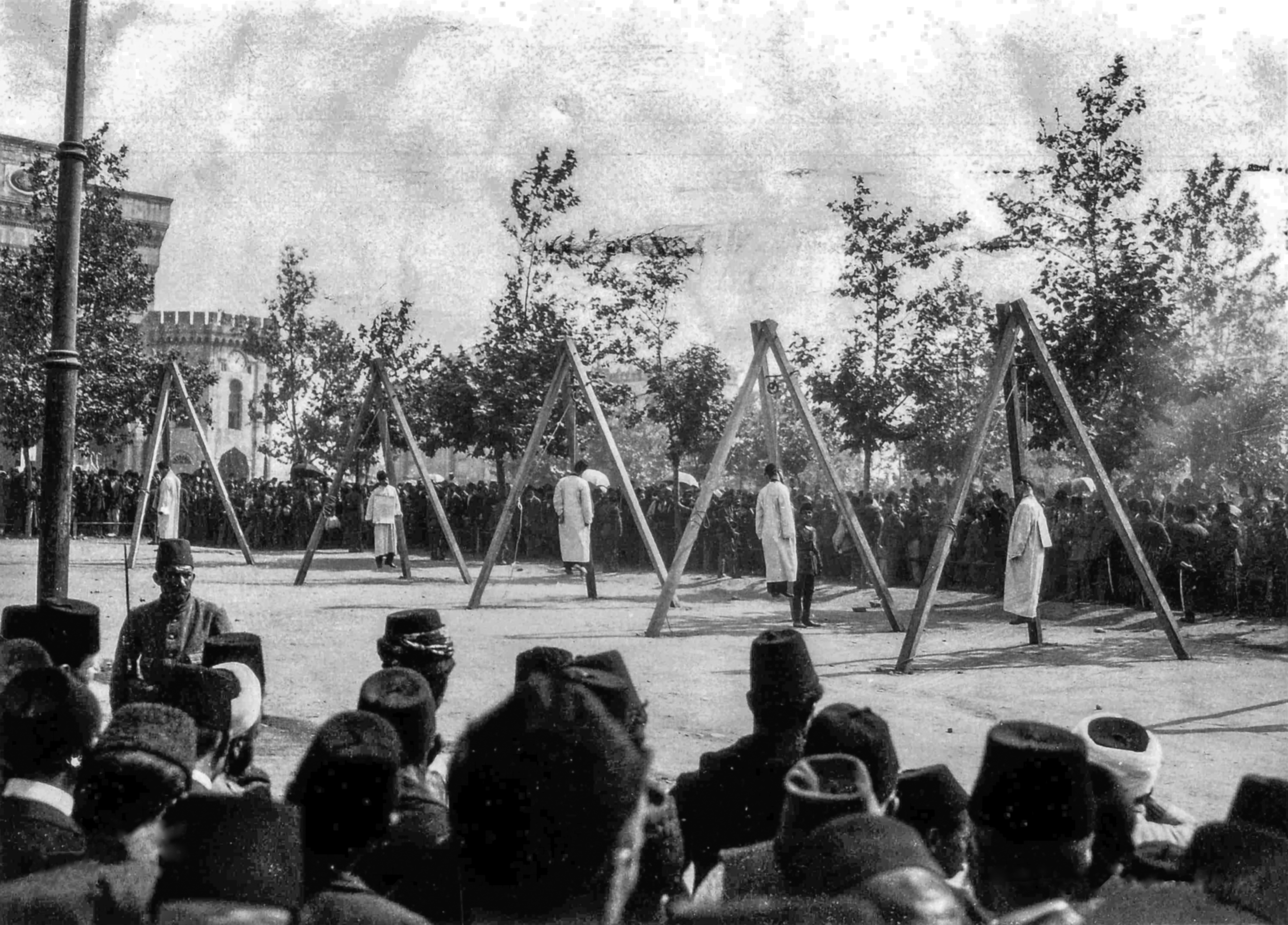
Armenian activists being executed by hanging in Constantinople.

- Second Battle of Artois — In what was referred to as the Second Action of Givenchy, British and Canadian forces attacked northwest of La Bassée, France and captured the front line, but were pushed back by German grenades and a shortage of ammunition.
- An official inquiry led by Lord Mersey into the sinking of the RMS Lusitania began at Methodist Central Hall in Westminster, London.
- French airplanes raided Baden and Karlsruhe, Germany.
- Armenian genocide — A group of 20 activists with the Social Democrat Hunchakian Party were hanged in the Sultan Beyazıt Square of Constantinople. Among those executed were Armenian leaders Paramaz, Aram Achekbashian, and Kegham Vanigian. Other Armenian leaders who were executed that same day while en route to Severek, Turkey included Harutiun Jangülian, Rupen Zartarian, Sarkis Minassian, Khachatur Malumian, and Nazaret Daghavarian.
- Japanese Government Railways extended the Echigo Line in the Niigata Prefecture, Japan, with station Arahama serving the line.
- The Cornish Library opened in Winnipeg. It received damage from flooding in 1918 and was repaired.
- The sports club Magni Grenivík was established in Grenivík, Iceland.
- The village of Denmark, Wisconsin was established.
- Born: Thomas Huckle Weller, American virologist, recipient of the Nobel Prize in Physiology or Medicine for his research into poliomyelitis viruses; in Ann Arbor, Michigan, United States (d. 2008)
- Died: Konstantin Konstantinovich, 56, Russian noble, grandson of Nicholas I of Russia (b. 1862)

== June 16, 1915 (Wednesday) ==
- Second Battle of Artois — French soldiers pushed towards Vimy Ridge but were held up as many German defense positions survived bombardment. British and Canadian forces launched a second attack north of La Bassée, France and a new attack on Bellewaarde, France, but failed to reach both objectives.
- Bussa rebellion — A revolt broke out in the town of Bussa, Nigeria following British Northern Nigeria Protectorate's decision to replace the Emir of Bussa with a bayt al-mal (native administration). The colonial capital received word that 600 rebels led by a local prince had attacked and killed half of the members of bayt al-mal and occupied the town. Despite a shortage of British colonial troops, the revolt was suppressed quickly with minimal casualties.
- The British Women's Institute was established.
- The association football club Lemense was founded in Leme, São Paulo, Brazil. The club was dissolved and revived twice in its history, first in 1967 and again in 2005.
- Born:
  - Mariano Rumor, Italian state leader, 39th Prime Minister of Italy; in Vicenza, Kingdom of Italy (present-day Italy) (d. 1990)
  - Lucy Dawidowicz, American historian, popular expert on modern Jewish history including The Holocaust, author of The War Against the Jews; as Lucy Schildkret, in New York City, United States (d. 1990)
  - Jack Ridley, American air force officer and test pilot, flew the Bell X-1 jet craft on its inaugural flight; as Jackie Lynwood Ridley, in Garvin, Oklahoma, United States (killed in plane crash, 1957)
- Died: Scotty Davidson, 24, Canadian hockey player, right wing for the Toronto Blueshirts in 1912 to 1914, helped Toronto win its first Stanley Cup (killed in France) (b. 1892)

== June 17, 1915 (Thursday) ==
- Second Battle of Artois — French forces launched a second attack on Vimy Ridge but failed to take it.
- British pilot Reginald Warneford died along with American journalist Henry Beach Newman after crashing a new Farman biplane during takeoff from Buc, France, just shortly after a ceremony in Paris in which he received the French Legion of Honour for shooting down a German airship.
- Former U.S. President William Howard Taft became president of the League to Enforce Peace when it was established during a peace convention at Independence Hall in Philadelphia. Other founding members of the organization included Elihu Root, Alexander Graham Bell, Rabbi Stephen Samuel Wise, U.S. Chamber of Commerce executives James Gibbons and Edward Filene, Harvard University President A. Lawrence Lowell, and former U.S. Cabinet member and diplomat Oscar Straus.
- The baseball stadium Bosse Field officially opened in Evansville, Indiana, the first municipally owned stadium in the United States. It is the third oldest operating ballpark after Fenway Park and Wrigley Field.
- Born:
  - Mario Echandi Jiménez, 33rd President of Costa Rica from 1958 to 1962; in San José, Costa Rica (d. 2011)
  - David "Stringbean" Akeman, American country musician, member of band for the TV variety show Hee Haw and a member of the Grand Ole Opry; in Annville, Kentucky, United States (d. 1973, murdered)
- Died: Thomas Jordan Jarvis, 79, American politician, 44th Governor of North Carolina (b. 1836)

== June 18, 1915 (Friday) ==
- Second Battle of Artois — The Allies halted the main offensive after repeated failures to break through the German line on the Western Front. Despite the French advancing about 3 kilometres (1.9 mi) towards Vimy Ridge on an 8-kilometre (5.0 mi) front, it was to the cost of over 2 million expended shells and loss of 102,500 casualties. The British suffered 27,809 casualties while the Germans lost 73,072 casualties.
- An official inquiry into the sinking of the RMS Lusitania wrapped after three days of interviews, including 35 testimonies from survivors. During closed sessions, the First Lord of the Admiralty tried to lay blame on Captain William Thomas Turner for being negligent in protecting the ship. However, testimony from surviving ship officers confirmed Turner had considered all risks of submarine attacks prior to and during the voyage. Lord Mersey, who headed the inquiry, concluded Captain Turner "exercised his judgment for the best" and that the blame for the disaster "must rest solely with those who plotted and with those who committed the crime".
- Four-time U.S. Amateur golfing champion Jerome Travers captured his only U.S. Open title at the tournament, one stroke ahead of runner-up Tom McNamara.
- The Motion Picture Directors Association (MPDA) was formed by 26 film directors in Los Angeles.
- Born:
  - Red Adair, American firefighter, notable innovator in extinguishing oil well fires and blowouts, noted battles included the infamous "Devil's Cigarette Lighter" oil well fire in Algeria in 1962 and the 1991 Kuwaiti oil fires; as Paul Neal Adair, in Houston, United States (d. 2004)
  - Alice T. Schafer, American mathematician, founding member of the Association for Women in Mathematics; as Alice Elizabeth Turner, in Richmond, Virginia, United States (d. 2009)
  - Robert Kanigher, comic book editor, known for managing the Wonder Woman franchise, creator of Sgt. Rock and The Flash; in New York City, United States (d. 2002)

== June 19, 1915 (Saturday) ==
- A royal decree from Denmark allowed Iceland, still a Danish colony, to get its own flag.
- Born: Pat Buttram, American actor, best known for the role of Mr. Haney in the TV series Green Acres; as Maxwell Emmett Buttram, in Addison, Alabama, United States (d. 1994)
- Died:
  - Benjamin F. Isherwood, 92, American naval officer, rear admiral and Engineer-in-Chief of the United States Navy, co-founder of the Bureau of Steam Engineering (b. 1822)
  - Sergei Taneyev, Russian pianist and composer, best known for his opera Oresteia; died of a heart attack (b. 1856)

== June 20, 1915 (Sunday) ==
- The town of South Omaha, Nebraska was annexed by the larger city of Omaha, adding 40,000 residents to the city's population.
- Born: Terence Young, British film director, directed the James Bond films Dr. No, From Russia with Love and Thunderball; as Stewart Terence Herbert Young, in Shanghai International Settlement, Republic of China (present-day Shanghai, China) (d. 1994)

== June 21, 1915 (Monday) ==
- Gorlice–Tarnów Offensive — Grand Duke Nicholas Nicholaevitch ordered Russian forces to abandon Galicia.
- Gallipoli campaign — French artillery bombarded Ottoman 2nd Division holding Kereves Spur (Kervizdere), causing 6,000 casualties. French attacked and captured part of the crest but didn't break through to capture the second part until nine days later, at a cost of 2,500 casualties.
- Battle of Bukoba — British colonial forces from Kisumu in British East Africa raided Bukoba, German East Africa in an attempt to destroy its wireless station.
- Georgia Governor John M. Slaton released a 29-page report on the hearing of Leo Frank where he concluded there was sufficient new evidence not available at the original trial that cast doubt on Frank's guilt on the murder of Mary Phagan and ordered the death sentence to be commuted to life imprisonment.
- The U.S. Supreme Court ruled that separate state laws in Oklahoma and Maryland that exempted voters from literacy tests or poll taxes were unconstitutional since they were designed to be discriminating against black voters, and therefore in violation of the Fifteenth Amendment to the United States Constitution.
- Born: Ernest Llewellyn, Australian violinist and music educator, founding director of the ANU School of Music; in Kurri Kurri, New South Wales, Australia (d. 1982)
- Died: Addai Scher, 48, Turkish clergy, archbishop for the Chaldean Catholic Church in Siirt; killed in the Assyrian genocide (b. 1867)

== June 22, 1915 (Tuesday) ==
- Gorlice–Tarnów Offensive — German and Austro-Hungarian forces captured Lemberg, effectively ending the offensive as most of Galicia was now back under control of the Central Powers. The Central Powers sustained between 87,000 and 90,000 casualties while Russia sustained eight times that, including 250,000 soldiers taken prisoner.
- The Imperial German Army created the army groups Centre and East to serve on the Western Front.
- The Airco DH.2 fighter plane was given an evaluative flight before the model was assigned to the No. 5 Squadron for operational test flights in France.
- The New York City Subway added three new lines in Brooklyn and Queens:
  - BMT Sea Beach Line with stations Eighth Avenue, Fort Hamilton Parkway, New Utrecht Avenue, 18th Avenue, 20th Avenue, Bay Parkway, Kings Highway, Avenue U, and 86th Street.
  - BMT Fourth Avenue Line in Brooklyn with train stations at Myrtle Avenue, DeKalb Avenue, Atlantic Avenue, Union Street, Ninth Street, Prospect Avenue, 25th Street, 36th Street, and 59th Street.
  - IRT Flushing Line from Vernon Boulevard–Jackson Avenue station in Queens to Grand Central in Manhattan.
- Ishikawa Electric Railway began operating the Ishikawa Line in the Ishikawa Prefecture, Japan, with stations Shin-Nonoichi, Oshino, Nuka-Jūtakumae, Shijima, Sodani, Dōhōji, Oyanagi, and Tsurugi serving the line.
- The Leichhardt Bus Depot opened in Sydney as a tram depot before it was converted to a bus depot in 1937.

== June 23, 1915 (Wednesday) ==
- First Battle of the Isonzo — Italy launched its first major military campaign in World War I with an army of 225,000 under command of Luigi Cadorna attacking Austro-Hungarian defense positions above the Isonzo River (now Soča) in the Alps.
- Battle of Bukoba — British colonial troops captured the German fort in Bukoba, German East Africa and destroyed the wireless station.
- Two magnitude 6.3 earthquakes struck within an hour of each other in the Imperial Valley, California. Six deaths were reported in Mexicali, Baja California, Mexico and damage costs were estimated at $900,000.
- German submarine SM U-40 was torpedoed and sunk in the North Sea by Royal Navy submarine HMS C24 with the loss of 38 of her 41 crew.
- The Royal Flying Corps decreed all aircraft with covered fuselages were to use the tricolor roundel, previously used on just the wings, on fuselage sides.
- Born: Aaron Robinson, American baseball player, catcher for the New York Yankees, Chicago White Sox, Detroit Tigers and Boston Red Sox from 1943 to 1951; in Lancaster, South Carolina, United States (d. 1966)
- Died: Ellen Hardin Walworth, 82, American historian, founder of the Daughters of the American Revolution (b. 1832)

== June 24, 1915 (Thursday) ==
- The Harry Elkins Widener Memorial Library was dedicated on Commencement Day at Harvard University, in memory of Harvard graduate and book collector Harry Elkins Widener, who died during the sinking of the RMS Titanic on April 15, 1912.
- Born: Fred Hoyle, British astronomer, leading theorist on stellar nucleosynthesis and the rejection of the Big Bang theory; in Gilstead, England (d. 2001)

== June 25, 1915 (Friday) ==
- Juan Luis Sanfuentes won the presidential election in Chile by a single vote over his rival Javier Ángel Figueroa. However, allegations of fraud and electoral intervention forced the National Congress of Chile to confirm the result, leading to a more decisive decision with 77 votes for Sanfuentes and 41 for Figueroa.
- Malay rebel leader Tok Janggut and an army of Malay warriors attempted a siege on the Malaysian territory of Pasir Puteh in Kelantan, Malaysia after proclaiming it to be independent from British colonial rule. The siege ended in a battle with colonial forces where Janggut was killed, effectively ending the rebellion.
- Born: Whipper Billy Watson, Canadian professional wrestler, heavyweight world champion in 1942 and 1956; as William John Potts, in East York, Ontario, Canada (d. 1990)
- Died: John James Clark, 77, Australian architect, best known for designing major landmarks in Melbourne including the Old Treasury Building and City Baths (b. 1838)

== June 26, 1915 (Saturday) ==
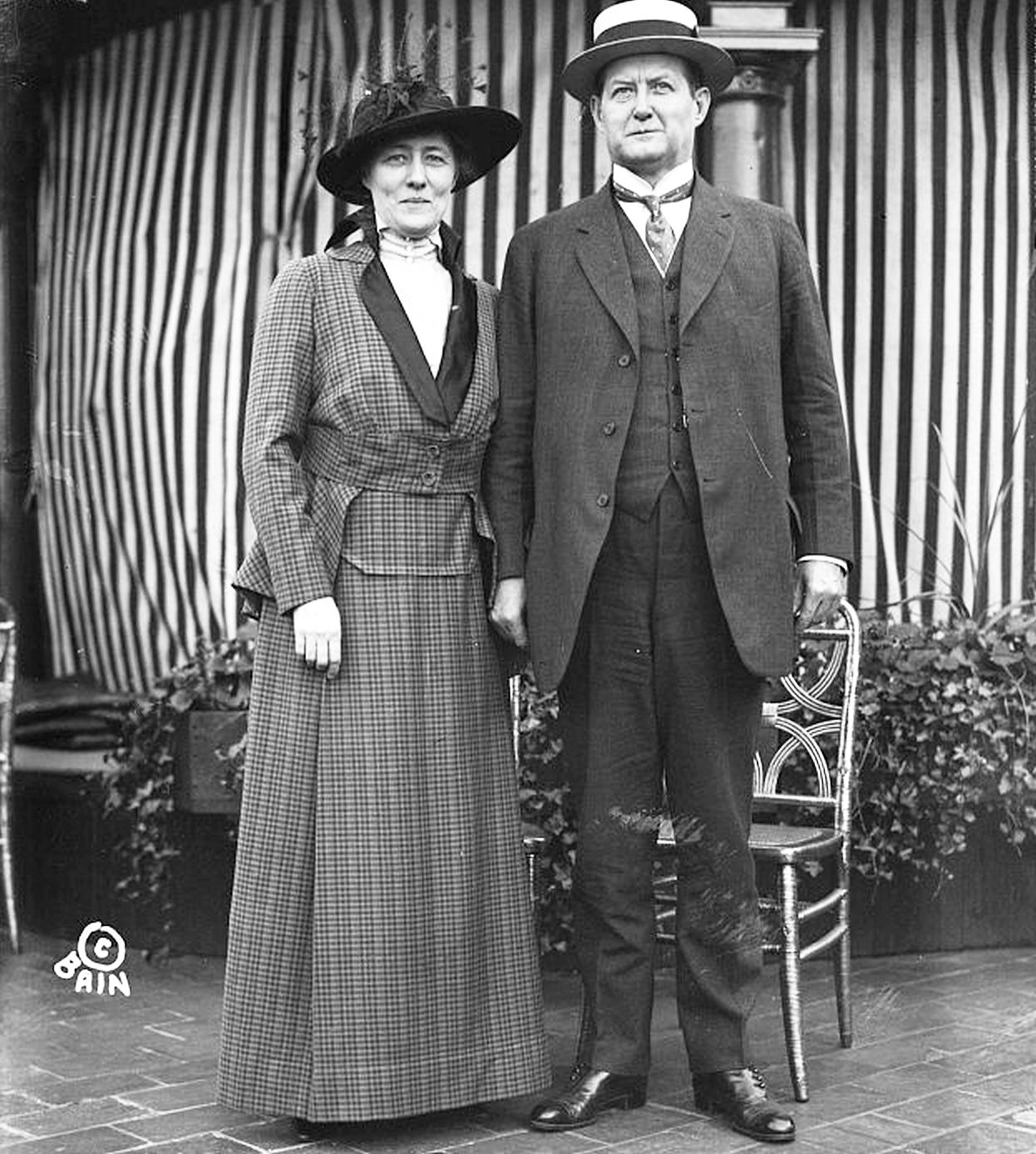
Georgia Governor John M. Slaton and wife Sarah Frances Grant

- Georgia Governor John M. Slaton and his wife Sarah Frances Grant left the state under security of the United States National Guard after a mob of people angered by his decision to commute Leo Frank's sentence to life imprisonment threatened them at their home in Atlanta.
- Armenian genocide — Rafael de Nogales Méndez, a Venezuelan serving with the Ottoman Empire, met with Mehmed Reshid, Governor of the Diyarbekir province, and learned the governor had received telegraphs directly from Interior Minister Talaat Pasha with orders to "Burn-Destroy-Kill" all Armenians in the area.
- Willis Carrier, who patented the modern air conditioner in 1914, formed Carrier Engineering Corporation with six other engineers to manufacturer and market the technology. They opened their first factory in Newark, New Jersey in 1920.
- By drawing 4.8 (32) each with Port Adelaide, South Adelaide ended the Magpies' run of 29 consecutive victories, including one against Carlton and one against a combined team from the other six SAFL clubs.
- The Saturday Evening Post began publishing P. G. Wodehouse's serialized novel Something Fresh, introducing the character Lord Emsworth of Blandings Castle.
- The village of Beachwood, Ohio was established. It became a city in 1960.
- Born:
  - Paul Castellano, American gangster, head of the Gambino crime family from 1976 to 1984; as Constantino Paul Castellano, in New York City, United States (d. 1985)
  - Willard Brown, American baseball player, outfielder for the Kansas City Monarchs and the St. Louis Browns from 1936 to 1950; in Shreveport, Louisiana, United States (d. 1996)
  - Walter Farley, American young adult writer, known for The Black Stallion series; in Syracuse, New York, United States (d. 1989)

== June 27, 1915 (Sunday) ==
- Born: Grace Lee Boggs, American author and social activist, author of The Invading Socialist Society and The Next American Revolution; as Grace Chin Lee, in Providence, Rhode Island, United States (d. 2015)

== June 28, 1915 (Monday) ==
- British cargo ship Armenian was torpedoed and sunk in the Atlantic Ocean by German ship SM U-24 with the loss of 29 crew. Survivors were rescued by a Belgian cargo ship.
- Battle of Gully Ravine — British forces attacked and captured key defense positions from the Ottoman Empire in Gallipoli that advanced the left flank of the British line closest to the Aegean Sea.
- Rapid snow melt in the Rockies and heavy rain caused the North Saskatchewan River to overflow in Alberta. River levels in Edmonton were reported to be rising over 10 feet. In the order to prevent the Low Level Bridge — the only available crossing over the river at the time — from being broken apart by river debris, Canadian Northern Railway parked several train cars on the bridge to bolster its weight. Some housing and several lumber mills in the river valley were swept away by the flooding.
- Died:
  - Guillermo Billinghurst, 63, Peruvian state leader, third President of Peru (b. 1851)
  - Victor Trumper, 37, Australian cricketer, batsman for the Australia national cricket team from 1898 to 1912 and the New South Wales cricket team from 1894 to 1914; died of Bright's disease (b. 1877)
  - Charles Spagnoletti, 82, British engineer, first superintendent for the Great Western Railway telegraph; died of pneumonia (b. 1832)

== June 29, 1915 (Tuesday) ==
- Battle of Ngaundere — British colonial forces captured the German-held town of Ngaoundéré, German Cameroon) during the Kamerun campaign.
- The association football club ABC was established in Natal, Rio Grande do Norte, Brazil and remains the oldest active club in the Brazilian state.
- The association football Serrano was formed Petrópolis, Rio de Janeiro state, Brazil.
- Born: Dizzy Trout, American baseball player, pitcher for the Detroit Tigers from 1939 to 1952; as Paul Howard Trout, in Sandcut, Indiana, United States (d. 1972)
- Died: Jeremiah O'Donovan Rossa, 83, Irish American Fenian leader, advocate for Irish independence through the Fenian Brotherhood and Irish Republican Brotherhood (b. 1831)

== June 30, 1915 (Wednesday) ==
- Shabin-Karahisar uprising — Out of ammunition, the remaining men of the Armenian militia in the Giresun Province of Turkey engaged Ottoman troops in hand-to-hand combat. Ottoman soldiers defeated the militia and entered the fort the resistance had holed up in to massacre Armenian women, children and elderly inside.
- British destroyer HMS Lightning struck a mine in the Thames Estuary of England. She broke in two, the bow section sinking with the loss of fifteen of her crew. The stern section was towed to Sheerness, Kent where it was later scrapped.
- French commander Henri Gouraud was wounded at Gallipoli and replaced by his divisional commander, Maurice Bailloud.
- German submarine SM UC-2 struck a mine and sank in the North Sea.
- The Hay Gaol prison closed in Hay, New South Wales, Australia due to its small inmate population (it had only three prisoners).
- Born: Harry Weese, American architect, designer of the Washington Metro; in Evanston, Illinois, United States (d. 1998)
- Died: Preston Watson, 35, Scottish aviator, designer of aircraft that could be airborne under their own power; killed in a plane crash (b. 1880)
