= 1926 San Marino general election =

National election

- 12 December 1926
- All 60 seats in the Grand and General Council; 31 seats needed for a majority
- Turnout: 56.79% (▲21.32pp)
Party	Leader	Vote %	Seats	+/–
Fascist Party	Giuliano Gozi	100%	60	+31
This lists parties that won seats. See the complete results below.
Secretary for Foreign Affairs before	Secretary for Foreign Affairs after election
Giuliano Gozi; Fascist Party	Giuliano Gozi; Fascist Party

General elections were held in San Marino on 12 December 1926 to elect the eighth term of the Grand and General Council. It was a sham election, all opposition being prevented to participate by internal and Italian threats. After it had taken over the country in April 1923, the Sammarinese Fascist Party was the only party to contest the elections, winning all 60 seats, while the official report spoke of a sole dissident ballot. A new electoral law guaranteed safe undisputed seats to the two incumbent Captains Regents.

== Background ==
After the Patriotic Bloc victory in 1923, San Marino had effectively become a puppet of Fascist Italy.

Benito Mussolini did not waste time to show his industriousness with propaganda goals, beginning the construction of a Rimini-San Marino railway which would become the visible symbol of his leadership over the small country.

== Electoral system ==
The new electoral law of 11 November 1926, abolished universal suffrage to restore householders' ancient rights, established a copy of the Acerbo law, and extended the Council term to six years. More, even if this bloc voting system theorically allowed a small delegation of opposition candidates, Italian menaces prevented any other list outside the Sammarinese Fascist Party, which ran undisputed the snap election that was immediately called. San Marino consequently became a one-party state.

Voters had to be citizens of San Marino, male, 24 years old and meet at least one of the following requirements:

- the head of the family,
- a graduate,
- belong to the militia,
- have an annual income above 55 lire.

== Results ==
Party	Votes	%	Seats
Sammarinese Fascist Party	2,444	100.00	60
Total	2,444	100.00	60
Valid votes	2,444	99.96	
Invalid/blank votes	1	0.04	
Total votes	2,445	100.00	
Registered voters/turnout	4,305	56.79	
Source: Sammarinese Parliament

== See also ==
- List of MPs elected in the 1926 Sammarinese general election
