= Sammarinese Democratic Union =

Sammarinese Democratic Union Unione Democratica Sammarinese
- Leader: Manlio Gozi
- Founded: 1920
- Dissolved: 1925
- Ideology: Conservatism; Liberalism; Conservative liberalism
- Political position: Centre-right
- National affiliation: Patriotic Bloc (1923–1925)
- Italian counterpart: Italian Liberal Party
- Colours: Blue

The Sammarinese Democratic Union was a conservative political movement in San Marino and a counterpart of the liberal coalition which ruled Italy before the fascist era.

== History ==
During the early 20th century, the Sammarinese Democrats were a free group of liberal politicians which supported the democratic reforms introduced by the Meeting of 1906, and that were the moderate alternative to the leftist Sammarinese Socialist Party. The progressive political wind blowing in the small republic, and the plurality-at-large electoral system, banned any type of consistent Conservative activism in the Sammarinese political life for quite a dozen of years.

The situation heavily changed due to World War I. Even if the country was officially neutral, many volunteers supported the Italian struggle alongside the democratic world, and the inflation striking the Italian lira hugely touched the Sammarinese economy, and finally the social and political life. Strikes and violence exacerbated the political situation, with the landowners taking strength in a match of respective extremisms.

The Democratic Union was founded in the summer of 1920. It was not a political party, but a political movement effectively claiming the return to the pre-1906 institutional asset. Despite the Union's third-place finish in the now-proportional elections of 1920 behind the centrist Sammarinese People's Party and the Socialists, it began to be heavily helped by its Italian counterpart and, later, directly by some Fascist squads led by Italo Balbo, and by a Carabinieri garrison called by the Sammaninese government after the murder of Fascist activist Bosi on May 21, 1921.

A Union member, Giuliano Gozi, founded the Sammarinese Fascist Party as a Union spin-off on August 26, 1922. The Socialists were banned from the elections of 1923, during which the Union joined the Fascist-led Patriotic Bloc with all other centre-right forces. San Marino became an authoritarian, fascist state, and the Union disbanded itself in 1925.
