= 1938 San Marino general election =

National election

- 29 May 1938
- All 60 seats in the Grand and General Council; 31 seats needed for a majority
- Turnout: 78.49% (▲12.77pp)
Party	Leader	Vote %	Seats	+/–
Fascist Party	Giuliano Gozi	100	60	0
This lists parties that won seats. See the complete results below.
Secretary for Foreign Affairs before	Secretary for Foreign Affairs after election
Giuliano Gozi; Fascist Party	Giuliano Gozi; Fascist Party

General elections were held in San Marino on 29 May 1938. After it had taken over the country in April 1923, the Sammarinese Fascist Party was the only party to contest the elections, winning all 60 seats.

== Electoral system ==
Voters had to be citizens of San Marino, male, 24 years old and meet at least one of the following requirements:

- the head of the family,
- a graduate,
- belong to the militia,
- have an annual income above 55 lire.

== Results ==
Party	Votes	%	Seats
Sammarinese Fascist Party	2,916	100.00	60
Total	2,916	100.00	60
Valid votes	2,916	100.00	
Invalid/blank votes	0	0.00	
Total votes	2,916	100.00	
Registered voters/turnout	3,715	78.49	
Source: Nohlen & Stöver
