= 1920 San Marino general election =

National election

- 14 November 1920
- All 60 seats in the Grand and General Council; 31 seats needed for a majority
- Turnout: 59.17%
Party	Leader	Vote %	Seats
PPS		47.75	29
PSS		29.58	18
UDS	Manlio Gozi	22.67	13
This lists parties that won seats. See the complete results below.

General elections were held in San Marino on 14 November 1920 to elect the sixth term of the Grand and General Council. It was the country's first snap election, and the first election to use a form of proportional representation. The result was a victory for the Sammarinese People's Party, which won 29 of the 60 seats.

== Electoral system ==
Following Italy, San Marino adopted a party-list proportional representation electoral system on 15 October 1920. The three-class division was eliminated, and councillors' terms limited to four years.

Voters had to be citizens of San Marino, male, the head of the family and 24 years old.

== Campaign ==
The Sammarinese People's Party made its debut, after Pope Benedict's abolition of the non expedit had allowed the foundation of its twin, the Italian People's Party. By their part, landowners created a conservative party, the Sammarinese Democratic Union, campaigning for the return to pre-1906 institutions to restore order against strikes and political violence.

== Results ==
Party	Votes	%	Seats
Sammarinese People's Party	1,125	47.75	29
Sammarinese Socialist Party	697	29.58	18
Sammarinese Democratic Union	534	22.67	13
Total	2,356	100.00	60
Valid votes	2,356	98.54	
Invalid/blank votes	35	1.46	
Total votes	2,391	100.00	
Registered voters/turnout	4,041	59.17	
Source: Nohlen & Stöver

== Aftermath ==
The Socialists refused to join the newly elected council, following a revolutionary political strategy. On 11 January 1921, all Socialist seats were declared vacant due to absence and a by-election was held on 10 April, in which ten Christian democrats and eight conservatives were elected.
