= 1923 San Marino general election =

National election

- 4 March 1923
- All 60 seats in the Grand and General Council; 31 seats needed for a majority
- Turnout: 35.47% (▼23.70pp)
Party	Leader	Vote %	Seats	+/–
Patriotic Bloc	Giuliano Gozi	100	60	New
This lists parties that won seats. See the complete results below.
Secretary for Foreign Affairs before	Secretary for Foreign Affairs after election
Giuliano Gozi; Fascist Party–BP	Giuliano Gozi; Fascist Party–BP

General elections were held in San Marino on 4 March 1923 to elect the seventh term of the Grand and General Council. It was a snap election that marked the beginning of fascist rule in the republic. Left-wing parties were prevented from participating, while all centre-right forces ran as a single "Patriotic Bloc". Of the 60 seats, 29 were taken by the Sammarinese Fascist Party, 20 by the Sammarinese People's Party, 9 by the Sammarinese Democratic Union and two by the Fascist-puppets Volunteers of War. Later the country was taken over by the Fascist Party.

== Background ==
San Marino had been close to a civil war in 1921, with Socialist red forces on one side, and Christian Democratic white forces on the opposite side together with the Conservatives. The situation was so explosive that the government introduced a six-month censorship, and called a carabinieri garrison to restore order, while Fascist brigades from Italy entered San Marino without invitation. Meanwhile, Sammarinese authorities became closer to Italy, as underlined by the adoption of the anniversary of Italian victory in World War I as a public holiday.

When Benito Mussolini rose to power in Rome, he immediately managed to take control over the small republic of San Marino. The old Council was forcibly disbanded on 27 January 1923, and a snap election was consequently called. Fascist threats obtained their goal: the Socialist Party did not take part to the election and a sole, centre-right list called Patriotic Bloc ran undisputed. The Bloc was obviously dominated by the Sammarinese Fascist Party, which obtained the majority of seats together with their puppets Volunteers of War. The turnout was very low, with leftist electors boycotting the vote.

Twenty-nine year old Giuliano Gozi became the first Fascist Captain Regent in April 1923. The party political program was to dismantle all democratic reforms of the Meeting of 1906, and to emulate the Italian regime. A Sammarinese carabinieri corps was created, the anniversary of the March on Rome became a public holiday, and the Captains of the Castles of San Marino became appointed by the Captains Regents.

== Electoral system ==
Voters had to be citizens of San Marino, male, the head of the family and 24 years old.

== Results ==
Party or alliance		Votes	%	Seats
Patriotic Bloc	Sammarinese Fascist Party	1,437	100.00	29
Patriotic Bloc	Sammarinese People's Party	1,437	100.00	20
Patriotic Bloc	Sammarinese Democratic Union	1,437	100.00	9
Patriotic Bloc	Volunteers of War	1,437	100.00	2
Total		1,437	100.00	60
Valid votes		1,437	96.83	
Invalid/blank votes		47	3.17	
Total votes		1,484	100.00	
Registered voters/turnout		4,184	35.47	
Source: Nohlen & Stöver
