= Sammarinese People's Party =

Sammarinese People's Party Partito Popolare Sammarinese
- Leader: Carlo Balsimelli; Egisto Morri
- Founded: 1919
- Dissolved: 1925
- Succeeded by: Sammarinese Christian Democratic Party (not official)
- Newspaper: La Libertà
- Ideology: Christian democracy Popolarismo
- Political position: Centre
- National affiliation: Patriotic Bloc (1923–1925)
- Italian counterpart: Italian People's Party
- Colours: White

The Sammarinese People's Party (PPS) was a Christian democratic political party in San Marino, forerunner of the current Sammarinese Christian Democratic Party, and counterpart of the Italian People's Party.

== History ==
The PPS was founded in December 1919 by Egisto Morri, Carlo Balsimelli and some socially engaged priests. The party was backed by Pope Benedict XV to oppose the Sammarinese Socialist Party, after the abrogation of the non expedit act. During midsummer 1920, the PPS organized some farmers' strikes and called for general elections, which took place on November 14, 1920. Elections were held under party-list proportional electoral system; it was a narrow victory, the party obtaining 29 of the 60 seats, just two seats short of an absolute majority. However, the revolutionary, and finally self-disruptive, political line of the Socialists, which abandoned the Grand and General Council to organize continuous strikes, left the Populars alone against their other opponents, the rightist Sammarinese Democratic Union which was led by the new-born Sammarinese Fascist Party.

During the general election of 1923, the PPS was part of the Fascist-led Patriotic Bloc. Benito Mussolini's agents worked to lead the small republic toward a dictatorship. The PPS was finally disbanded by the Fascists in 1925, a few days after the closure of the PPI in Italy.
