= Patriotic Bloc (San Marino) =

Patriotic Bloc Blocco Patriottico
- Abbreviation: BP
- Leader: Giuliano Gozi
- Founded: 1923
- Dissolved: 1926
- Headquarters: City of San Marino
- Ideology: Italian fascism Authoritarianism; Factions: Christian democracy Popolarismo; Social conservatism Conservative liberalism
- Political position: Far-right; Factions: Centre to centre-right

The Patriotic Bloc was a far-right coalition of parties which ran undisputed in the Sammarinese election of 1923.

The Bloc was dominated by the Sammarinese Fascist Party, and was also composed of the Sammarinese People's Party, the Sammarinese Democratic Union, and the Fascist-puppet Volunteers of War. Threats by Italian fascists prevented any opposition presence, so the Bloc won all the seats to the Grand and General Council. By this means the Fascists took over the country in 1926, with San Marino becoming a one-party state.

== Results ==
Party or alliance		Votes	%	Seats
Patriotic Bloc	Sammarinese Fascist Party	1,437	100.00	29
Patriotic Bloc	Sammarinese People's Party	1,437	100.00	20
Patriotic Bloc	Sammarinese Democratic Union	1,437	100.00	9
Patriotic Bloc	Volunteers of War	1,437	100.00	2
Total		1,437	100.00	60
Valid votes		1,437	96.83	
Invalid/blank votes		47	3.17	
Total votes		1,484	100.00	
Registered voters/turnout		4,184	35.47	

== See also ==
- Sammarinese general election, 1923
