= Hakuyachō Station =

Railway station in Azumino, Nagano Prefecture, Japan

Ōito Line33 Hakuyachō Station 柏矢町駅
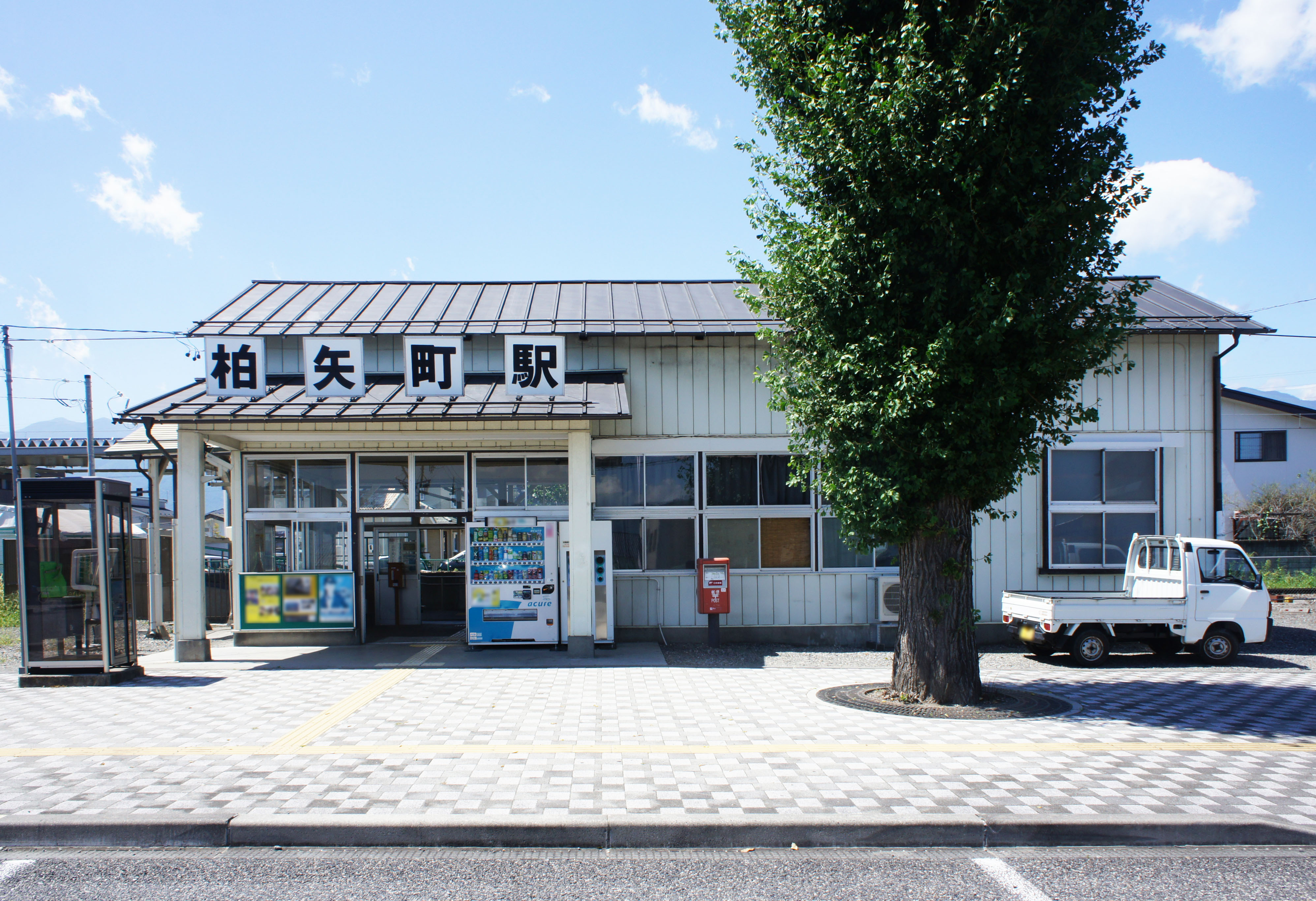
- Hakuyachō Station, August 2021

General information
- Location: 1034-1 Hotaka-Kashiwabara, Azumino-shi, Nagano-ken 399-8304; Japan
- Coordinates: 36°19′23.462″N 137°53′17.927″E
- Elevation: 545.2 meters
- Operator: JR East
- Line: ■ Ōito Line
- Distance: 14.2 km from Matsumoto
- Platforms: 1 side platform

Other information
- Status: Staffed
- Station code: 33
- Website: Official website

History
- Opened: 1 June 1915

Passengers
- FY2015: 521

Services
Preceding station	JR East	Following station
Hotaka One-way operation	Ōito Line Rapid	Toyoshina 34 towards Matsumoto
Hotaka 32 towards Minami-Otari	Ōito Line Local	Toyoshina 34 towards Matsumoto
Location
- Location within Nagano Prefecture Location within Japan

Hakuyachō Station (柏矢町駅, Hakuyachō-eki) is a train station in the city of Azumino, Nagano Prefecture, Japan, operated by East Japan Railway Company (JR East).

== Lines ==
Hakuyachō Station is served by the Ōito Line and is 14.2 kilometers from the terminus of the line at Matsumoto Station.

== Station layout ==
The station consists of one ground-level side platform serving a single bi-directional track. The station is a Kan'i itaku station.

== History ==
Hakuyachō Station opened on 1 June 1915. With the privatization of Japanese National Railways (JNR) on 1 April 1987, the station came under the control of JR East.

== Passenger statistics ==
In fiscal 2015, the station was used by an average of 521 passengers daily (boarding passengers only).

== See also ==
- List of railway stations in Japan
