= List of MPs elected in the 1926 Sammarinese general election =

List of MP elected during the Sammarinese election of 1926.

== List ==
Members by right as Captain Regents

1. Gozi Giuliano fu Gemino

2. Morri Ruggero fu Luigi

Members elected

3. Angeli Gino fu Giuseppe

4. Balducci Ezio di Nullo

5. Balducci Giuseppe fu Ezio

6. Barbieri Argio di Pietro

7. Belloni Protogene di Gaetano

8. Belluzzi Giuliano fu Lodovico

9. Braschi Arrigo fu Guido

10. Burgagni Nelson fu Antonio

11. Busignani Aldo di Vincenzo

12. Ceccoli Gino di Marino

13. Fattori Francesco di Luigi

14. Fattori Marino fu Federico

15. Filippi Melchiorre fu Pietro

16. Foschi Turiddu di Romualdo

17. Franchini Tassini Pier Giovanni fu Cesare

18. Gattei Donato di Matteo

19. Gozi Federico di Marino

20. Gozi Gino fu Gemino

21. Gozi Girolamo fu Gemino

22. Gozi Manlio fu Gemino

23. Grossi Gelasio di Agostino

24. Lonfernini Marino fu Sante

25. Manzoni Borghesi Angelo fu Bartolomeo

26. Marcucci Marco di Giacomo

27. Marcucci Vincenzo fu Marino

28. Michetti Mario fu Raffaele

29. Morri Francesco fu Luigi

30. Morri Marino fu Luigi

31. Mularoni Filippo fu Secondo

32. Mularoni Francesco fu Primiano

33. Mularoni Giuseppe di Marino

34. Mularoni Luigi fu Secondo

35. Nicolini Antonio fu Roberto

36. Pasquali Francesco fu Filippo

37. Pasquali Valerio fu Filippo

38. Reffi Rufo fu Francesco

39. Rossi Marino fu Silvestro

40. Santolini Francesco di Gregorio

41. Suzzi Valli Domenico di Battista

42. Valentini Luigi di Davide

43. Valentini Sanzio di Filippo

44. Valli Domenico di Marino

45. Zani Lorenzo di Oreste

46. Fattori Onofrio fu Marino

47. Francini Alberto fu Pietro

48. Morri Moro fu Vincenzo

49. Morri Egisto fu Andrea

50. Balsimelli Carlo fu Marino

51. Reffi Eugenio di Leone

52. Michelotti Simone fu Marino

53. Della Balda Marino fu Antonio

54. Michelotti Virgilio fu Marino

55. Della Balda Filippo fu Antonio

56. Righi Giuseppe fu Michele

57. Arzilli Giuseppe di Aldo

58. Lanci Giuseppe fu Alberico

59. Terenzi Lazzaro fu Lorenzo

60. Ciavatta Giovanni fu Elia

== Sources ==
- Republic of San Marino Web Site (Italian)
