= 1915 Swiss war tax referendum =

Referendum in Switzerland

6 June 1915
- Federal Decree concerning the enactment of an article of the Federal Constitution for the levying of a one-off war tax

Results
Choice	Votes	%
Yes	452,117	94.27%
No	27,461	5.73%
Valid votes	479,578	98.24%
Invalid or blank votes	8,589	1.76%
Total votes	488,167	100.00%
Registered voters/turnout	871,476	56.02%

A referendum on a war tax was held in Switzerland on 6 June 1915. Voters were asked whether they approved of amending the constitution to introduce a one-off war tax during the First World War, which Switzerland remained neutral. It was approved by a large majority of voters and all cantons, the first time a referendum had been passed in every canton.

== Background ==
The referendum was a mandatory referendum, which required a double majority; a majority of the popular vote and majority of the cantons. The decision of each canton was based on the vote in that canton. Full cantons counted as one vote, whilst half cantons counted as half.

== Results ==
Choice	Popular vote		Cantons		
Choice	Votes	%	Full	Half	Total
For	452,117	94.3	19	6	22
Against	27,461	5.7	0	0	0
Blank votes	5,646	–	–	–	–
Invalid votes	2,943	–	–	–	–
Total	488,167	100	19	6	22
Registered voters/turnout	871,476	56.0	–	–	–
Source: Nohlen & Stöver
