= Battle of Hébuterne =

1915 battle of World War I in France

- Part of Second Battle of Artois on the Western Front in the First World War
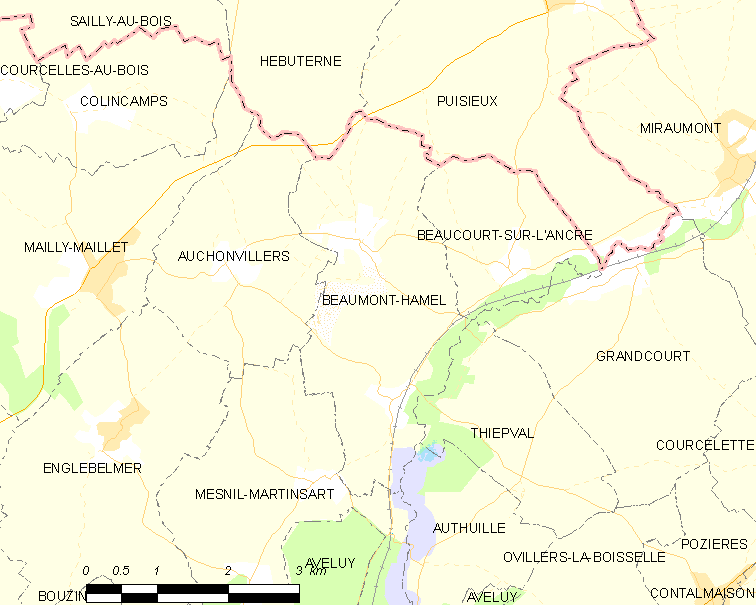
- Modern map of the municipality Beaumont-Hamel. Serre is on the Mailly-Maillet–Puisieux road.
Date	7–13 June 1915
Location	Hébuterne, France 50°07′34″N 02°38′11″E
Result	Indecisive

Belligerents
France	German Empire

Commanders and leaders
(French Third Republic) Noël de Castelnau	(German Empire) (Kingdom of Bavaria) Rupprecht of Bavaria

Strength
Second Army	6th Army

Casualties and losses
1,760 killed/missing 8,590 wounded Total: 10,351; 25 guns	c. 4,000; 1,200 killed (partial); 651–1,016 prisoners of war
- Hébuterne, a commune in the Pas-de-Calais department in the Hauts-de-France region.

The Battle of Hébuterne, (La Bataille de Toutvent, La 2e Bataille d'Hébuterne, La bataille de Serre-Hébuterne) took place from 7 to 13 June 1915 on the Western Front in Picardy, during the First World War. The French Second Army (General Noël de Castelnau) conducted the attack as part of a general action by several French armies, to hinder the movement of German reserves to Vimy Ridge, during the decisive action of the Tenth Army in the Second Battle of Artois (9 May – 18 June).

The village of Hébuterne is north of Albert and south of Gommecourt. After the fighting of 1914, the French and German lines ran between the village and Serre-lès-Puisieux (Serre) to the east, a village on the D 919 road, north of Beaumont-Hamel. About halfway from Hébuterne to Serre was Ferme Toutvent (Windy Farm) just inside a bulge in the German front line.

After several weather delays, the Second Army attacked on 7 June, overran the German first and second lines on a 3,900 ft (1,200 m) front and captured Toutvent Farm. From 7 to 13 June, both sides attacked and counter-attacked but the initial French gains were held and the new positions were consolidated. The French suffered 10,351 casualties and the Germans about 4,000. Two German trenches jutting into the new French position were fortified and called the Heidenkopf (pagan's head; Quadrilateral to the British).

== Background ==
=== Hébuterne and Serre ===
North of the Ancre river, the Auchonville Spur, the Beaucourt Spur from Colincamps and Grandcourt Spur, with the village of Serre-lès-Puisieux (Serre) on its summit to the north, point south-west down to the river. The Colincamps–Beaucourt Spur has a slight east–west rise to the north of Beaumont-Hamel, later known to the British as Redan Ridge. In the shallow valley between the Auchonvillers and Beaucourt spurs lies Beaumont-Hamel and the road to Auchonvillers. Hébuterne is 9 mi (14 km) north of Albert and Gommecourt lies further north. After the fighting of 1914, the front line ran between the village and Serre to the east, a village on the D 919 road, south of Hébuterne and north of Beaumont-Hamel, south-west of Puisieux and to the north-east of Mailly-Maillet. About half-way along the Rue de Serre from Hébuterne to Serre lay Ferme Toutvent (Windy Farm), just inside the German front line.

=== Battle of Albert (1914) ===
Course of the river Somme

On 21 September 1914, General Erich von Falkenhayn, Chief of Staff of Oberste Heeresleitung (the German army supreme command), ordered the 6th Army (Crown Prince Rupprecht of Bavaria) near Amiens, to attack westwards and envelop the French northern flank, which was south of the Somme. An offensive by the French Second Army (General Noël de Castelnau) forced Falkenhayn to divert two corps as soon as they arrived. The troops extended the front northwards from Chaulnes to Péronne on 24 September, to drive the French back over the Somme (from Ham to Péronne, the river runs north). On 26 September, the French dug in south of the Somme and on 27 September, the German II Cavalry Corps (Höhere Kavallerie-Kommando 2) drove back two French reserve divisions, clearing the front for the XIV Reserve Corps (General Hermann von Stein).

General Louis de Maud'huy found that instead of making another attempt to get round the German northern flank, his forces were menaced by a German offensive north of the Somme going in the opposite direction. From 25 to 27 September, the French XXI Corps and X Corps north of the Somme, with four Territorial divisions and the French II Cavalry Corps on the right flank, defended the approaches to Albert. On 28 September, the French were able to stop the German advance on a line from Maricourt to Fricourt and Thiepval south of the Ancre. The Germans could see French troops in Beaumont-Hamel and Serre on the far side of the valley. On 29 September, Joffre reorganised the command of the French forces north of the Somme into a new Tenth Army. By 5 October, the German Guard Corps had reached Serre; by October, the front line on which the French and then British Armies faced the Germans around Serre had been formed, little to change until the big German retreat of Operation Alberich (9 February – 20 March 1917).

=== 1915 ===
==== Strategic developments ====
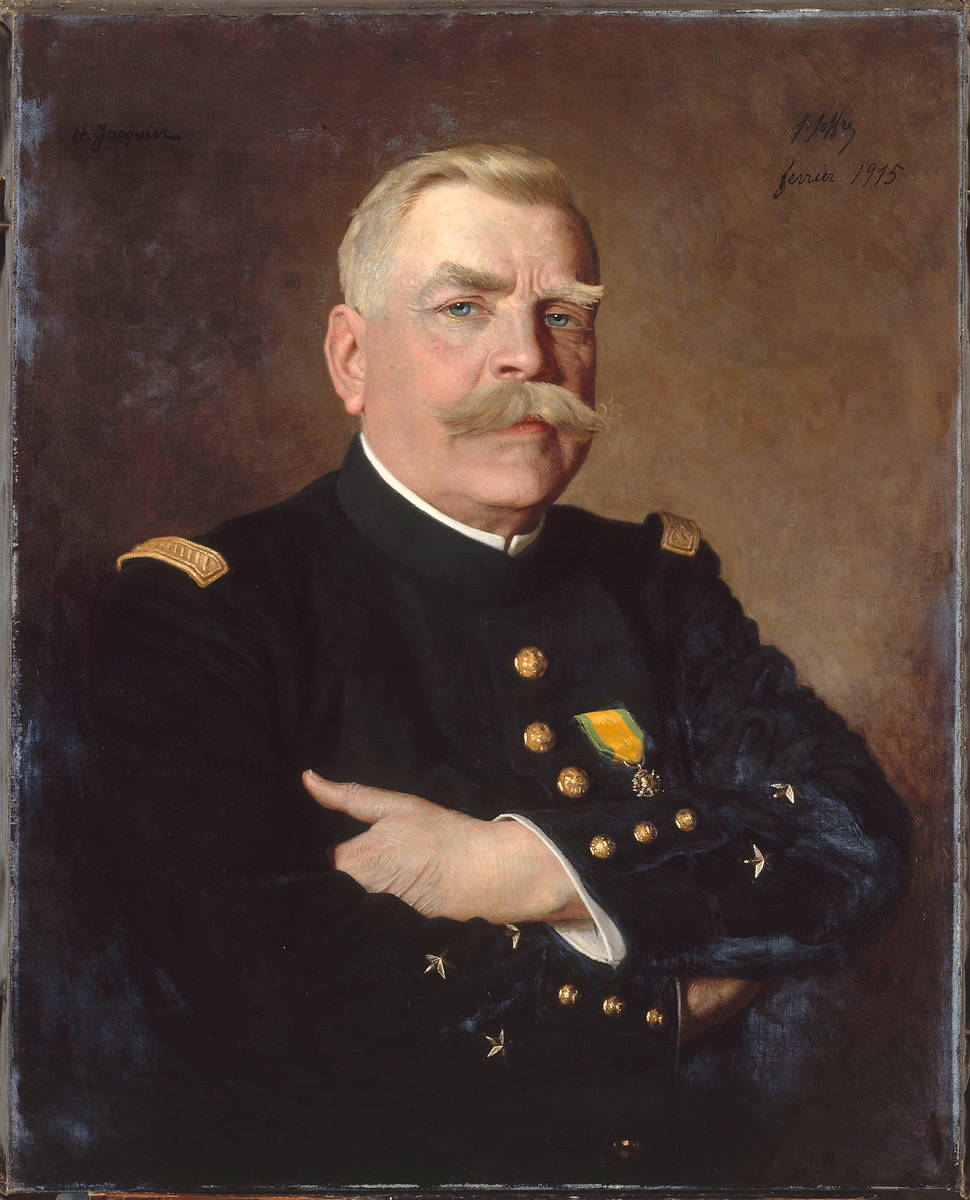
Portrait of General Joseph Joffre by Henri Jacquier

In March 1915, General Joseph Joffre, head of Grand Quartier Général (GQG) the supreme commander of the French armies, realised that the dire state of the Russian army made a defensive strategy in France impossible. Inactivity would benefit the Germans, even though the French had only begun to replace the industrial plant and raw materials overrun in 1914. Increasing the output of munitions was also in its infancy. General Ferdinand Foch proposed a "general action" on the Western Front to confuse the defenders and pin down reserves, then a "decisive action" at a place where the Germans would not be able to establish a new front after a breakthrough with only a short retirement. Joffre accepted a plan to capture Vimy Ridge and exploit eastwards into the Douai plain.

The French army had not completed its adaptation to siege warfare and much of the equipment necessary, particularly heavy artillery, did not exist. Joffre favoured continuous battle involving all resources but advocates of methodical battle like Foch, wanted a series of attacks, with pauses to reorganise and consolidate. Analysis of after-action reports received since 1914 led to the publication of But et conditions d'une action offensive d'ensemble (Objectives and Conditions of General Offensive Action, 16 April 1915) and Note 5779, a version circulated to divisional commanders. The note contained instructions on infiltration tactics, "rolling" barrages and the use of poison gas, which were to be used systematically for the first time. Joffre persuaded the British to attack on the northern flank of the Tenth Army. (Note: French doubts about the efficiency of the BEF had not diminished after the Battle of Neuve Chapelle and British doubts about the French had increased after the débâcle at Ypres on 22 April; Joffre had to agree to place reserves in Flanders to secure British co-operation.)

==== Tactical developments ====
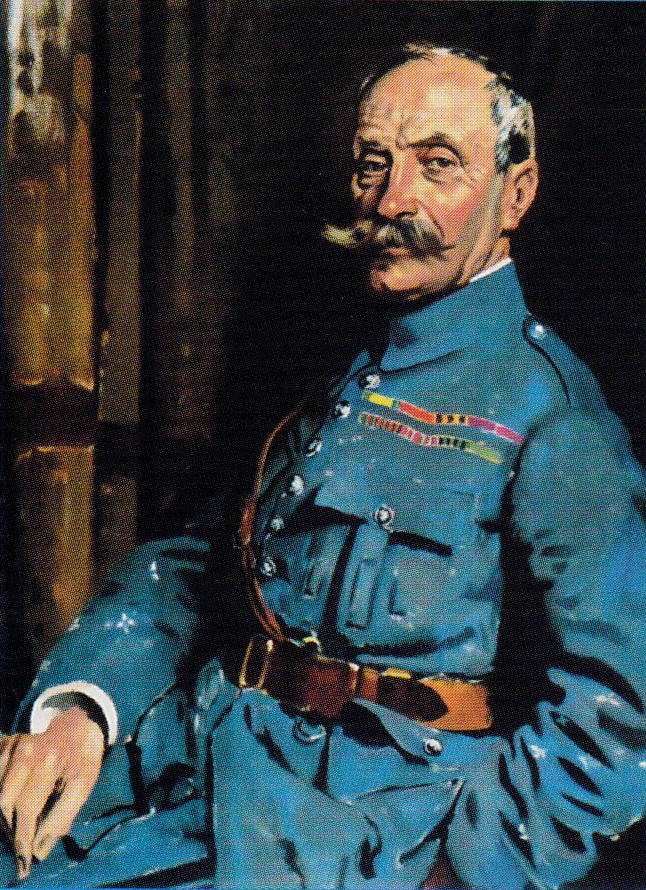
Ferdinand Foch by William Orpen

Over the winter lull, the German army began to reduce divisions from twelve to nine infantry battalions, to make it easier to shuffle whole divisions from quiet sectors. A German western offensive was cancelled in April, due to the deteriorating situation on the Eastern Front, where the Austro-Hungarian army faced collapse. The new 11th Army, which had been assembled from divisions raised in Germany over the winter and several other new divisions were sent east. The initiative in the west was left with the Entente armies, apart from the Second Battle of Ypres (22 April – 25 May 1915) and attacks in the Forest of Argonne during the summer. The defences of the German army in the west had been improvised since late 1914 but in many places were vulnerable to the growing number of French heavy guns. In the spring, the Westheer began to implement a standard defensive scheme and to build a second position, far enough behind the first position to require an attacker to pause to move field artillery into range. The front-line trench was elaborated into a front position with three wired-in trenches and camouflaged strong points; a line of concrete machine-gun nests designed for all-round defence were sited between the front and second positions.

Joffre canvassed the French army commanders for proposals for local offensives to assist the main effort by the Tenth Army but on 14 April rejected all but the plans submitted by the Second Army. Because of the manpower shortage in the Second Army, Castelnau suggested a limited attack to capture the German first position but Joffre wanted a more ambitious plan to break through the German defences, even if this narrowed the attack front. Joffre provided the 53rd Division, the XVII Corps and used the new 151st Division and the 154th Division to increase the XI and XIV Corps to three divisions each. Preparations were to begin immediately, ready for late April and early May. When the Germans began the Second Battle of Ypres on 22 April, Joffre had to alter his offensive plans. Flanders was reinforced by three divisions from the Tenth Army and replaced by XVII Corps and the 53rd Division from the Second Army, which made the double attack by the Tenth and Second armies impossible to achieve. From 15 May, Joffre began preparations for the second big attack by the Tenth Army. It was even more important than during the first attack on 9 April for the other French armies to divert German attention from the Tenth Army front. On 17 May, Joffre ordered the commanders of the Second, Fourth, Fifth and Sixth armies to carry out spoiling attacks and to produce schemes for a larger effort.

== Prelude ==
=== Plan ===
Deprived of the XVII Corps and the 53rd Division, Castelnau continued to work on the plan to support the main effort by the Tenth Army, assuming that the divisions would be replaced; if not the resources would have to come from within the Second Army. XI Corps (Général Maurice Baumgarten) was to attack with the 21st Division (Général Dauvin) comprising the 64th, 65th, 93rd and 137th Infantry Regiments and the 97th Territorial Infantry Regiment. The division was so understrength that Castelnau set only the German front line and the second trench as the objective but later became more optimistic that a German collapse might occur. XI Corps was reinforced with a brigade from XIV Corps and a battalion of the 56th Division; Joffre agreed to the I Cavalry Corps moving closer to the front, ready to exploit success. Castelnau kept command of the army artillery, the 53rd Infantry Brigade, a battalion of the 56th Division and the I Cavalry Corps, ready to exploit opportunities. Preparations had to be complete by 30 May and on 28 and 29 May, Castelnau issued orders for the attack to begin on 1 June. Toutvent Farm was to be attacked after two days' artillery preparation and then the troops were to dig in facing Serre to the south-east and La Louvière Farm to the north-east. Once the objectives had been achieved, Castelnau would decide if reserves were to continue the attack towards La Louvière Farm and Serre, then swing north. The 21st Division was reinforced by a 75 mm field gun group, heavy artillery batteries of XI Corps and part of the artillery of the 56th Division.

To disguise the point of attack, the other Second Army corps were to simulate preparations on 30 and 31 May, especially with artillery-fire. On 6 June, Castelnau altered the plan to accommodate Joffre's late changes. The 21st Division with the 53rd Brigade and a battalion of the 56th Division under command, was to attack at 5:00 a.m. on 7 June, with the support of 22 batteries of 75 mm field guns, eight batteries of heavy artillery and 30 58 mm Crapouillot (toad) mortars; the 56th Divisional artillery was to bombard Gommecourt further north. The 51st Division was near Marieux in army reserve and the I Cavalry Corps assembled around Villers-Bocage. The deceptions on the rest of the front ordered on 28 May continued. The artillery preparation begun on 5 June had proceeded satisfactorily and by 2:00 a.m. on 7 June, the 21st Division with the battalion of 56th Division on its left flank, was east of the Hébuterne–Auchonvilliers road, opposite Toutvent Farm and the 53rd Brigade formed the second line on the west side of the road. The 51st Division in reserve, echeloned its brigades back from Bayencourt, Courcelles and Beaussart, its rear elements at Marieux and Sarton; the divisions of I Cavalry Corps gathered to the north of its billeting area.

=== French preparations ===
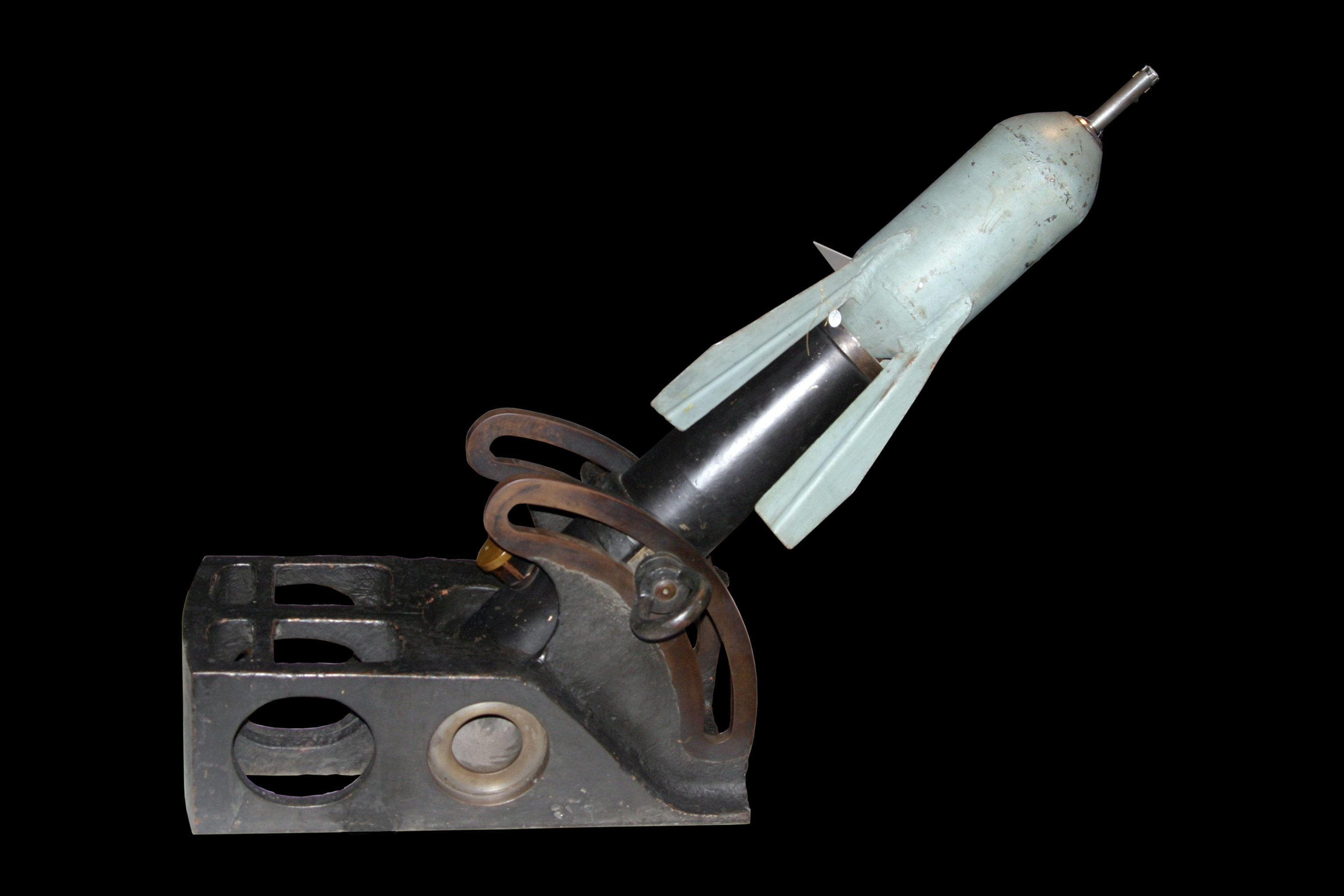
Example of a loaded Mortier de 58 mm type 2 Crapouillot (toad) at the Musée de l'Armée, Paris

An attack on Toutvent Farm, 1.9 mi (3 km) from Beaumont-Hamel was a secondary effort for the larger scheme. The Second Army could conduct the attack if Joffre allotted more ammunition; surplus heavy artillery was transferred to Lorraine front and Crapouillot mortars to the Tenth Army, which left the Second Army with sixty heavy guns for the attack; Castelnau asked for more ammunition to be sure of destroying the German fortifications. As the preliminaries were complete, the attack could begin in four days and on 24 May, Joffre approved the plan, granted the extra ammunition and another 24 Crapouillot mortars. French reconnaissance found no sign of German troop or artillery transfers from the 2nd Army, which had eleven German divisions opposite, from Berles-au-Bois to the Oise, to the 6th Army at Arras.

The Second Army comprised twelve divisions in the XIII, XIV and XI Corps and the independent 62nd Division, 56th Division and the 86th Division. The I Cavalry Corps (Général Louis Conneau), with three divisions, was concentrated to the west of Amiens from 12 May. The 21st Division was withdrawn from the front line from 24 to 26 May and replaced by Territorial troops. On 29 May, Joffre transferred the 51st Division from the Fifth Army to the Second Army to permit Castelnau to commit all of the Second Army reserve if the Germans collapsed; the attack of the Tenth Army on Vimy Ridge was postponed because of poor weather until 7 June. Joffre moved a division of the Colonial Corps into the Second Army area, in case the attack was more successful than expected; Joffre also offered the 6th Division, which was in reserve behind the Tenth Army but Castelnau declined.

=== German preparations ===
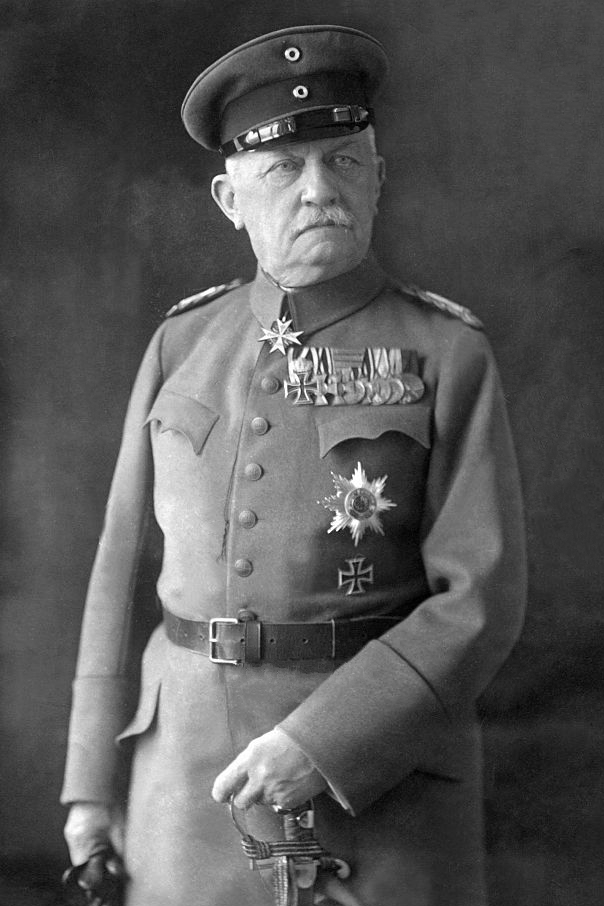
Karl von Bülow, commander of the 2nd Army.

The section of the Western Front around Hébuterne was held by the 2nd Army (General Karl von Bülow) with its headquarters in St Quentin. The 52nd Division (Generalleutnant Karl von Borries) held a front from Monchy-au-Bois to Serre and on its southern flank, the XIV Reserve Corps held the ground to Montauban. Since the fighting in late 1914, the area around Toutvent Farm had become a salient about 9,200 ft (2,800 m) wide, jutting 3,000 ft (900 m) beyond the German lines on either side. The German had been fortifying the area during the winter and spring 1915, because of its excellent observation over the Hébuterne–Colincamps plain. On 13 May, Reserve Infantry Regiment 99 of the 26th Reserve Division was ordered to send II, III and IV Battalions to the 6th Army, which came back after 30 June, having suffered 952 casualties. The survivors of the regiment passed on their experience with reports, demonstrations and examples of hand grenade tactics.

During the month, the XIV Reserve Corps also lost six companies of Württemberg replacement troops which became part of Reserve Infantry Regiment 122. In late May, the Germans detected French preparations opposite the new 52nd Division. Air reconnaissance discovered five new communication trenches near Toutvent Farm. Troops could hear wagons moving from Auchonvillers at night and from the lines of RIR 119 around Beaucourt-sur-l'Ancre (Beaumont) wagons were seen moving between Albert and Auchonvillers. The French dug saps forward from the front line then linked them by digging sideways and more new communication trenches were spotted. Germans travelling through occupied villages in the neighbourhood heard rumours from the inhabitants that they would soon be liberated.

== Battle ==
=== 7 June ===
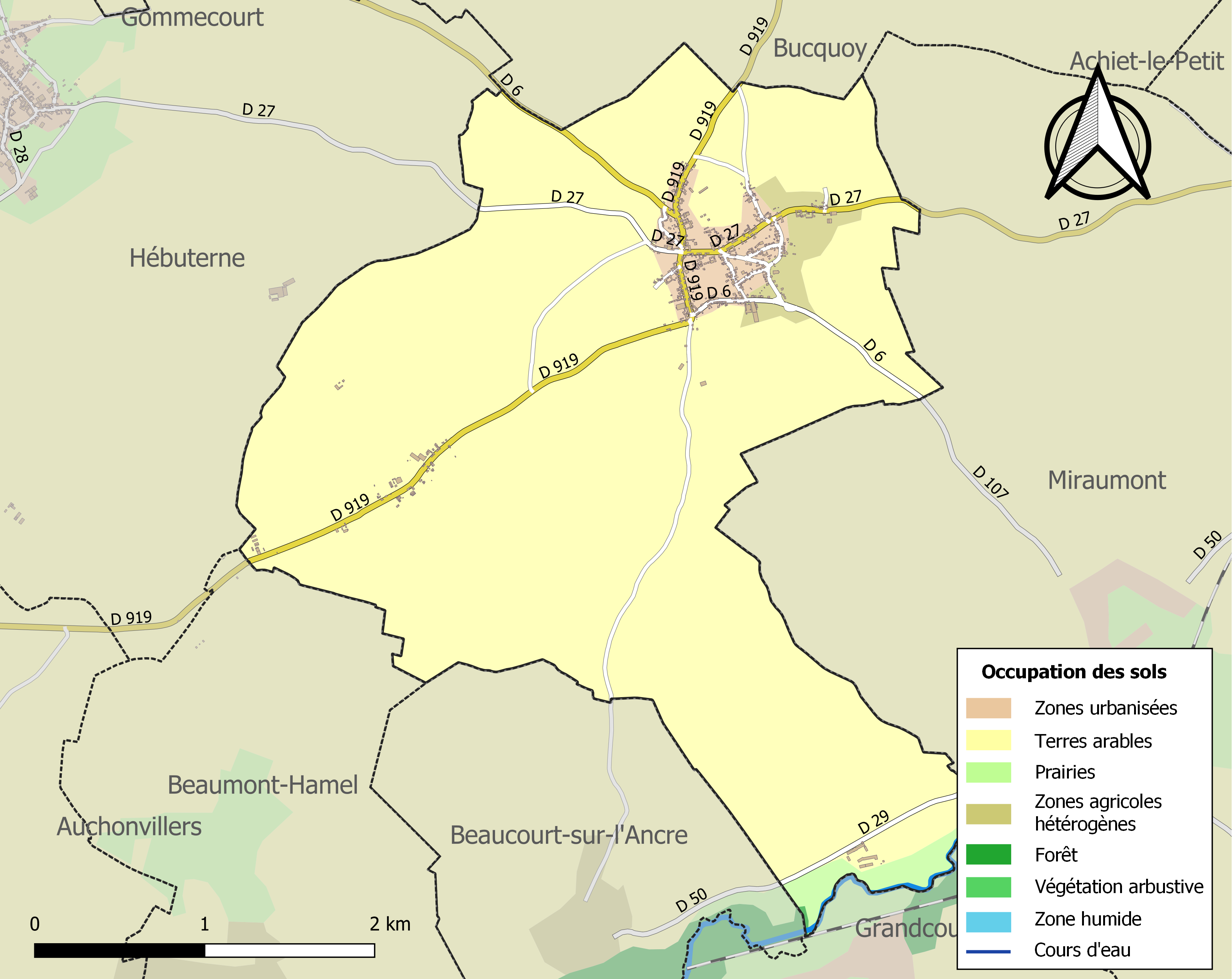
Road map of Puisieux and environs

At 4:00 a.m. a lull in the French artillery-fire, that had begun some hours earlier, ended and bombardment resumed on the defences of RIR 119. After thirty minutes, French infantry joined in with small-arms fire and RIR 119 stood to; there was no attack and the small-arms fire stopped. There was a great deal of firing on the right flank and then silence. The French 21st Division attacked at 5:00 a.m., overran the German front and second trenches on a 3,900 ft (1,200 m) front and surrounded Toutvent Farm. Nothing could be seen by RIR 119 through the fog and smoke of the bombardment. A runner was sent back with a message that contact has been lost with the 52nd Division on the right flank and that the regimental flank has been uncovered but that Sector S6, south of the Mailly–Serre road, still held. A scouting party found that Toutvent Farm had been captured and that IR 170 was vulnerable to an advance around its left flank. A message arrived from the 52nd Division that the farm had fallen and the French had pressing forward to Sector Serre-East, 4,600 ft (1,400 m) of trench had been captured and the farm taken, after a determined defence by its garrison.

Animation of a Shrapnel shell

The French stopped to consolidate and mop up pockets of resistance. At 9:00 a.m. the fog lifted and observers of the 26th Reserve Division saw that the French had overrun the German front line for about 0.62 mi (1 km) north of the Mailly-Maillet–Serre road and that reserves were moving forward with ammunition and trench stores. The divisional artillery at once began to fire in support of the 52nd Division. The III Battalion, IR 180 (Oberst [Colonel] von Linck) was alerted and at noon received orders to recapture Sector S3 from La Louvière Farm on the right (northern) flank and Toutvent Farm and continue the advance west of La Louvière Farm. The infantry moved up via Copse 125 in sweltering heat and occasional artillery-fire.

On arrival, III Battalion found that IR 170 and IR 66 had recaptured much of Sector S3 and retook Sector S4. Reinforcements began to converge on Serre and II Battalion, RIR 109 (Oberstleutnant [Lieutenant-Colonel] von Baumbach) was ordered towards Miraumont to the south. Flanking fire from the artillery of the 26th Reserve Division was found to have great effect in supporting the defence of the 52nd Division, by pinning down the French in and behind the new front line. French counter-battery fire, guided by artillery-observation aircraft, fell on the German artillery positions but the gunners kept firing amidst the French Shrapnel shells, one battery firing 1,350 rounds during the day. The French attacked again at noon towards Bataillon Scupin of IR 180 but were quickly stopped as they advanced in the open; at 1:00 p.m. more German reinforcements were ordered forward. By nightfall, French troops were consolidating on the ridge, 980 ft (300 m) east of Toutvent Farm, having taken 400 prisoners and four machine-guns, for about 1,400 French casualties. Ammunition columns moved forward to the German artillery positions through French harassing fire but counter-attacks that night were cancelled, due to the difficulty in co-ordinating attacks at short notice.

=== 8 June ===
The 21st Division continued its attack to increase the depth of the break-in but the main effort was to be made against La Louvière Farm on the left (northern) flank by the 53rd Brigade, to threaten Serre with being outflanked from the north. The 53rd Brigade attack towards the farm with the 75e and 14e Infantry Regiments was to capture the German trenches north-east of Toutvent Farm along the Hébuterne–Serre road; the rest of the Second Army was to stay on the defensive. The attack began at 3:30 a.m. but the Germans had already recovered from their disorganisation on 7 June and the 2 1/2 battalions opposite the French on 7 June had been reinforced by several more. The reinforcements counter-attacked, supported by a great volume of artillery-fire, which caused many casualties to the French reserves as they tried to move forward and pinned them down. After early success by some of the attacking units, the 53rd Brigade took until the night of 8/9 June to capture the last of its objectives by a grenade attack. During the evening, Castelnau sent orders to widen the breach on the southern flank along the Serre–Mailly-Maillet road to create jumping-off points for operations against Serre. The French attacked again at 3:00 a.m. and advanced past Toutvent Farm, which lay in Sector S3 in the middle of the bulge in the German front line. The 8th and 11th companies of IR 180 were dispatched to reinforce the defenders of IR 170 and IR 66. The French advance was stopped after about 1,600 ft (500 m) and at 4:15 a.m. the 10th Company, IR 180, counter-attacked the French in Sector S3.

The German infantry advanced in the open and then recaptured the trench in hand-to-hand fighting, taking forty prisoners. The 9th and 11th companies IR 180 had advanced in support and retook the rest of S3 along with another fifty prisoners. Around 10:30 a.m., the French attacked again in four waves but shortly after the infantry got going, they were repulsed again by devastating German artillery-fire; a French aircraft was shot down by German infantry during the attack. A thunderstorm drenched the battlefield but the French resumed their attacks at 11:30 a.m. only to be repulsed again by the German artillery; a party of IR 180 surrounded and took prisoner 37 French troops. After an intense hour-long bombardment, the French attacked again but each effort was repulsed by German artillery-fire. Counter-battery fire from the French artillery failed to suppress the German guns but the bombardment falling on the German trenches demolished them incrementally; by the evening the German infantry had little protection. After dark, two companies from IR 66 relieved two of IR 180; I Battalion, IR 190 reached La Louvière Farm. Troops sent forward to Serre found that its defences had been destroyed. After dark, patrols from RIR 119 and RIR 111 went out to mark the captured ground with flags for their artillery and fresh troops arrived from Beaumont, ready to attack up the Serre–Mailly-Maillet road. Recruits manned trench blocks, small French attacks on the front of RIR 119 were repulsed and some ground was retaken.

=== 9 June ===
The French attacked further south at La Signy Farm near the Serre–Mailly-Maillet road, with the fresh 243e Infantry Regiment and the 347e Infantry Regiment, supported by the 233e Infantry Regiment. Thick fog delayed the French attack until 5:00 p.m.; most of the French were repulsed by German artillery-fire and new belts of barbed wire. Part the 52nd Division was forced back to the second line, leaving the flank of I Battalion, RIR 119 uncovered and units from RIR 121, IR 180 and IR 99 counter-attacked. An attempt to gain touch with I Battalion, IR 170 failed in the fog, as did small French attacks. Two companies of RIR 121 reinforced Feste Soden on the southern flank of the French break-in, to fill a gap between RIR 119 and IR 170. Conflicting orders arrived during the day, to dig in or prepare to attack and were then cancelled. Patrols reconnoitred and troops from IR 111 (28th Reserve Division) saw the French infantry being repulsed by artillery and small arms fire. Troops from III Battalion, IR 111 probed towards Toutvent Farm and found that the French were dug in on the Wisengründe (meadows) about 2,300 ft (700 m) west of Serre. A patrol to the right, looking for IR 66, bumped into French troops and after an exchange of hand grenades, both sides retreated, the Germans with two prisoners. III Battalion, IR 180 on the right flank attacked and ejected the French in La Louvière Farm and managed to link with IR 66, taking a mixed bag of 100 prisoners from the French 21st Division, XI Corps and infantry and gunners of XIV Corps.

=== 10 June ===
From 9 to 10 June, Baumgarten received two regiments of the 51st Division and artillery reinforcements for another attack; lack of time for an adequate artillery preparation led to a postponement until the afternoon of 10 June. Despite many casualties from German machine-guns, the French infantry captured the German trenches south of Toutvent Farm a far as 330 ft (100 m) north of the Mailly-Mallet–Serre road. At 4:00 a.m. the French artillery began to bombard Sector S6 at Beaucourt-sur-l'Ancre, on the southern flank of the French attack front. French infantry attacked the front of IR 170 an hour later and the French infantry were engaged by flanking fire from the 1st Company IR 180 and the 8th Company, RIR 121. French troops began to envelop the 8th Company, which retired towards Hill 143. IR 180 ran out of ammunition and the 12th Company, RIR 111 gathered spare ammunition and carried it over, losing several casualties to French artillery-fire. All of the officers of the 1st Company, IR180 were found to have become casualties and Vizefeldwebel Kessler stayed behind to co-ordinate the defence.

Kessler sent messengers to Serre for reinforcements, before being killed repulsing the French attack. By the time that the attack ended, hardly any of the few survivors had not been wounded. The right flank or RIR 119 had been exposed and two companies of II Battalion, RIR 121 moved forward to plug the gap. The French bombardment continued and several small counter-attacks failed, through lack of force and poor co-ordination, which also prevented bigger counter-attacks by I and II battalions, RIR 99. On the right flank, Sector S3 was still vulnerable to being overrun from a dip in the ground which shielded French infantry moving up to La Louvière Farm. The Germans moved troops of I Battalion IR 190 and I Battalion, RIR 180 during the night of 9/10 June and the following morning. Several German units had been forced to yield ground but artillery, firing from three sides, had been able to repulse the majority of the French attacks. Two fresh Bavarian battalions reached the area and the German infantry spent the night repairing trenches and putting out more wire; Serre and the adjacent sectors were taken over by the 26th Reserve Division.

=== 11–13 June ===
On 11 June, Castelnau gave orders that the gains since 7 June were to be consolidated, ready to continue operations towards Serre. The Germans used the lull to dig in and relieve tired units but care was taken to leave no trace for French balloon and aircraft observers to see. It was believed that the HQ of III Battalion, RIR 111 (Oberstleutnant von Ley) had been identified this way and destroyed by French artillery. RIR 111 began a new trench west of Serre but the digging was spotted by the French and the area bombarded until 12 June. A plan was laid for a counter-attack in Sector S6 near the Mailly-Maillet–Serre road by Regiment Krause (I and II battalions IR 185, 185th Division), Regiment Heiden (II Battalion, RIR 109, 28th Reserve Division and I Battalion, IR 186 of the 185th Division) and a battalion from BRIR 15. The troops assembled at 1:30 a.m. with RIR 109 leading the attack 66 ft (20 m) in front of the second wave, which was to mop up 98 ft (30 m) in front of the third wave, which carried trench stores to consolidate the captured ground. The attack began at 2:00 a.m. but was exposed by flares and searchlights and subjected to massed small-arms fire, particularly on the right (northern) flank. The first wave found the French trench empty and assumed that the French had run away. A grenade fight began and when two red flares were set off in the French lines, the French artillery replied with an hour-long bombardment. The German infantry got lost in the maze of trenches, which did not correspond to their maps and the troops retreated to Beaucourt less one platoon, left behind to receive stragglers and to link the trenches south of the road with those west of Serre.

The Germans counter-attacked again in the early hours of 12 June and were repulsed again, after which the German artillery resumed its bombardment of the French positions. After the failure of the second counter-attack, Hauptmann Nagel, the commander of Sector S6, decided to close the gap between the right flank of the 26th Reserve Division near the Mailly-Maillet–Serre road and the left of the 52nd Division south-west of La Louvière Farm. A new trench about 1.6 mi (2.5 km)-long, later called Hensslergraben (Henssler Trench) was to be dug. On 13 June at 4:00 a.m., the French 51st Division attacked towards Serre with the 327e, 233e and 243e Regiments. The infantry attacked north of the Mailly-Maillet–Serre road in waves followed by columns and forced back III Battalion, RIR 121 on its right flank. South of the road, II Battalion, RIR 121 shot down the French infantry when they were about 490 ft (150 m) away in no man's land. Troops of RIR 119 fought illuminated by the flames of a farmyard, as German doctors and orderlies evacuated wounded from the cellar. A few small French probes were attempted after the main attack but by 8:00 a.m. the French had retired towards La Signy Farm; RIR 121 suffered 314 casualties. The French official account recorded that the attack consolidated the French positions on the southern flank towards the Mailly-Maillet–Serre road. The attack left Hennslergraben and Bayerngraben (Bavarian Trench) in a salient, which was later called Heidenkopf (pagan's head). French artillery bombarded the German positions for the rest of the day but beyond the French front line, troops and guns could be seen moving south.

== Aftermath ==
=== Analysis ===
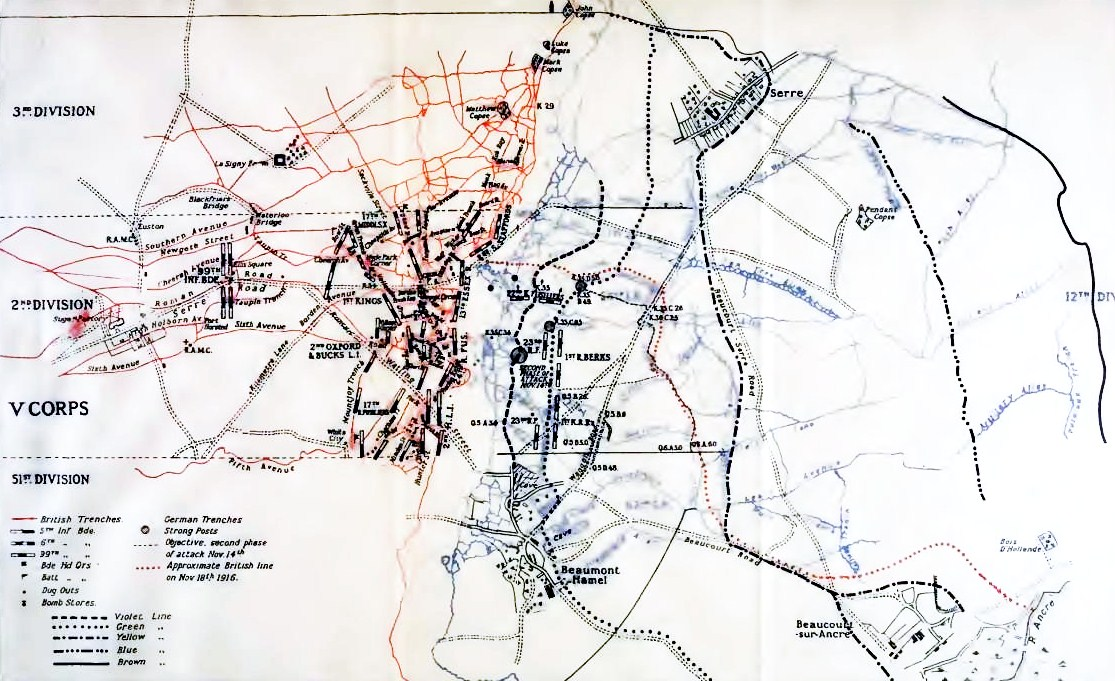
Map showing the German fortifications around Serre by the time of the British attack on 13 November 1916

In volume III of Les armées françaises dans la Grande guerre (1923), the French official history, the historians of the Service Historique wrote that the fighting from 7 to 10 June and capture of Toutvent Farm had been a costly success. The operation had been based on careful planning, implemented by determined troops, who had breached the German defences and driven a salient 980 yd (900 m) deep into the German line on a 1.2 mi (2 km) front. German counter-attacks, made with great vigour, failed and the Germans reinforced the area with 5 1/2 fresh battalions of infantry and a considerable amount of artillery.

The German defences between the old front line and Serre had been captured, the village was not prepared for defence and there were few German troops to resist another attack. Despite the lack of fortification, the long slope up to Serre and the orchards and fences around it made it easy to defend and the Second Army would need reinforcement to capture the village. Serre was of little tactical value except as a jumping off point for a bigger attack and Joffre gave priority to the Tenth Army at Arras; preparations for another attack by the Second Army continued as a deception.

In 1928, the British official historian, James Edmonds, referred to the French supporting operations, which were handicapped by a lack of heavy guns and ammunition. The attack on Serre by elements of the French XI Corps took the German salient at Toutvent Farm and held it against German counter-attacks. The French supporting attacks were costly and enormously demanding on the limited French stock of ammunition. The lack of success of the French operations shook the confidence of the French government in Joffre. In a 2004 web publication, Didier Lodier wrote that on the morning of 7 June, the 64th, 65th, 75th, 118th, 137th Infantry Regiments of the 35th RAC attacked from Hébuterne, captured two lines of trenches on a front of 1,300 yd (1,200 m) and took many prisoners. Toutvent Farm was on a bare ridge and was captured by the attack by the 140th, 162nd, 361st Infantry Regiments against determined resistance by the German garrison, which suffered many killed and 400 taken prisoner. Four German counter-attacks from 10 to 13 June were repulsed by the 233rd, 243rd and 327th Infantry Regiments on the road between Hébuterne and Serre.

In 2005, Robert Doughty wrote that the decisive action was the Second Battle of Artois, supported by a general action along the rest of the French front, according to a proposal by Foch at the end of March. The Second Army, 19 mi (30 km) further south, had attacked from 7 to 13 June and advanced 980 yd (900 m) on a 1.2 mi (2 km) front but the casualties incurred by the general action amounted to 40 per cent of those suffered by the Tenth Army, with little benefit to the main attack. In 2009, William Philpott wrote that the French attack on Serre showed that with a sufficient weight of artillery, the German front line could be captured fairly easily without mass casualties. Subsequent attacks encountered reinforced defences which could not be bombarded as effectively and infantry attacks were costly failures. Analysis of the failures led to the French moving away from breakthrough attempts to methodical, limited, set-piece attacks within the range of artillery. The experience of defending led to more emphasis by the Germans on deep dugouts and tactical reserves close by, able to move relatively freely along communication trenches and covered ways. The garrison of Serre redoubled their efforts to fortify the village.

In a 2010 translation of excerpts from the 1915 volumes of Der Weltkrieg 1914 bis 1918: Militärischen Operationen zu Lande ("The World War 1914–1918: Military Operations on Land"), the German official history, Mark Humphries and John Maker wrote that with greater numbers and the advantage of attacking in fog, the French had taken the German front position. Over the next week, the defenders had limited the French success to the elimination of a German salient west of Serre by the rapid transfer of reinforcements to the threatened area. French attacks further south at Fricourt on 10 and 19 July failed. Ralph Whitehead wrote in 2013, that as fresh troops arrived, the reinforcements sent to Serre returned to their usual positions and the German commanders decided that the French attacks were a diversion. The HQ of the XIV Reserve Corps reviewed the German performance in the battle; the best efforts of the 52nd Division and the 26th Reserve Division had not prevented the French from advancing on a 1.6 mi (2.5 km) front, after preparing the ground with artillery and mortar fire. German counter-attacks had failed to recapture the lost ground, which the German commanders judged to be a serious defeat. The reviewers concluded that counter-attacks would have to be bigger and have more artillery support. Scraping up men and improvising units with unfamiliar leaders had led to men not following orders, even when they were appropriate, particularly at night. The recapture of the original front line would have boosted morale but offered no tactical benefit.

=== Casualties ===
The French official historians wrote in Les Armées Françaises dans la Grande Guerre that from 7 to 15 June, the French had suffered casualties of 59 officers and 1,701 men killed or missing; 115 officers and 8,475 wounded, most lightly; a total of 10,351 officers and men; the French artillery lost 25 guns, five of them heavy, to German artillery-fire. Ten German officers and 621 men were taken prisoner, along with six machine-guns; 1,200 German dead had been buried by one French battalion on 1,300 ft (400 m) of front. In 2005, Robert Doughty wrote that the attack on Serre cost the French Second Army 10,351 casualties, 1,760 of which were fatal. In 2010, Mark Humphries and John Maker wrote that in the fighting between 7 and 15 June, the 2nd Army had about 4,000 casualties against a French loss of 10,350 men. In the 2016 translation of the campaign history of Infantry Regiment 66 (IR66) of the 52nd Division, IR66 took 70 French prisoners on 8 June, the 2nd Company of IR 66 suffered ten men killed, 41 wounded and three missing, the 9th Company eleven killed, 38 wounded and four missing. On 9 June the 10th Company suffered four killed, about twelve seriously wounded and the 5th Company lost several men killed to mortar fire. During the night of 10/11 June, the 10th Company had ten casualties, mostly head wounds. By 14 June, the 5th Company had suffered another 18 killed and 33 wounded, the 10th Company, 7–8 killed, and 36 wounded, about half seriously. David O'Mara wrote in 2018 that the French Official History (Les Armées Françaises dans la Grande Guerre) total for prisoners taken and unit war diary (journaux des marches et operations) claims, added up to 1,016 prisoners. O'Mara also used the data in Les Armées Françaises dans la Grande Guerre for French casualties and that the French artillery lost 25 field guns and five heavy pieces.

=== Subsequent operations ===
==== The British Third Army ====
On 20 July 1915, the Third Army of the British Expeditionary Force (BEF) began to relieve the tired 21st Division and the 22nd Division, which had rarely been out of action since September 1914, with the 4th Division and the 48th (South Midland) Division. The relief by the British was to free French units from what had become a quiet sector of the Western Front, useful for introducing raw troops to trench warfare, before moving to more active fronts. The British took over from Hébuterne to the Ancre, between the experienced French 56th Division to the north and the new 154th Division to the south. The 1/6th Royal Warwickshire Regiment replaced the 92e Regiment d'infanterie at Hébuterne on 21 July and during the night of 30/31 July, X Corps, with the 51st (Highland) Division, 18th (Eastern) Division and the 5th Division took over from the French 22nd, 151st and part of the 28th Division from the Ancre to the Somme. Much of the French artillery and engineer units stayed behind to support the British as they got used to their new positions. The 21st Division and the 22nd Division returned to the line south of the Somme from Frise to Foucaucourt a few weeks later.

==== First day on the Somme ====
Before the French attack in June 1915, the Heidenkopf had been part of the original front line through Matthew Copse and Toutvent Farm. The French attack had captured the German defences further north, leaving the Heidenkopf as a salient jutting into no man's land. The Germans judged the area to be untenable and did not intend to make a determined stand if attacked. The redoubt was mined and left occupied by only a machine-gun team and a party of engineers, who were to blow the mine as soon as attacking troops entered it. When the British 4th Division attacked the Heidenkopf (Quadrilateral Redoubt to the British) at 7:30 a.m. on 1 July 1916, the German machine-gun jammed, the engineers sprung the mine too soon and were caught in the explosion before the British arrived. The magnitude of the blast was far greater than expected and blocked the entrances to many of the German Stollen (deep dugouts) in the vicinity. The 3rd Company, on the right flank of Reserve Infantry Regiment 121, was overrun and 600 yd (550 m) of the German support trench was captured.
