= Sammarinese Fascist Party =

Sammarinese Fascist Party Partito Fascista Sammarinese
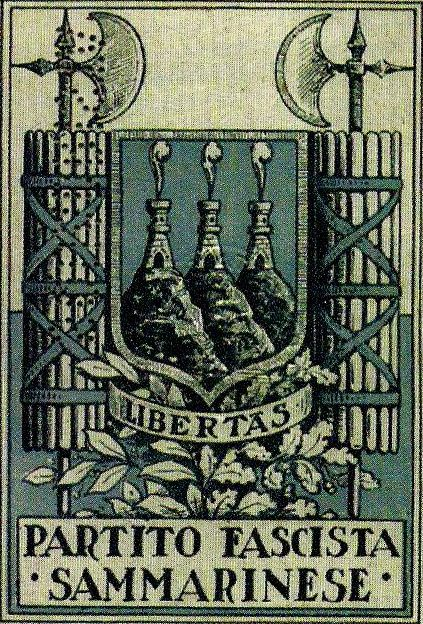
- Leader: Giuliano Gozi
- Founded: 10 August 1922
- Dissolved: 16 November 1944
- Headquarters: City of San Marino
- Newspaper: Il Popolo Sammarinese
- Ideology: Italian fascism Corporatism
- Political position: Far-right
- National affiliation: Patriotic Bloc (1923–1926)
- Italian counterpart: National Fascist Party

The Sammarinese Fascist Party (Italian: Partito Fascista Sammarinese) or PFS was a fascist political party that ruled San Marino from 1923 to 1943.

== History ==
The party was founded on 10 August 1922 and led by Giuliano Gozi, a Sammarinese World War I veteran who volunteered in the Royal Italian Army. The Sammarinese party was modelled directly on the National Fascist Party of the surrounding Kingdom of Italy. Gozi came from a distinguished family and held the posts of Secretary for Foreign Affairs (in San Marino, the foreign secretary leads the cabinet) and Secretary for the Interior; these two offices gave him control of the military and police. From the beginning, the party used violence and intimidation against opponents such as the Socialists. Its party newspaper was the Il Popolo Sammarinese, modelled after the Il Popolo d'Italia. In terms of policy and ideology, the party was not innovative and stuck closely to Italian fascism. They pursued industrialization which turned a country of mostly farmers into one of factory workers.

In April 1923, Gozi was elected as the first fascist Captain Regent. After the October elections, both Captains Regent were fascists and remained so in subsequent elections for the next two decades as all other political parties were banned in 1926, effectively making San Marino a one-party state. However, independent politicians continued to form a majority in the Grand and General Council until 1932. In addition, the party was split between Gozi's faction and Ezio Balducci's faction, forcing them to look to the Italian party for guidance and mediation.

In 1932, Balducci's faction started a rival newspaper, La Voce del Titano. The next year he was accused of plotting a coup and arrested by Italian authorities after fleeing to Rome. Balducci and other alleged conspirators were purged from the party and tried and sentenced to hard labour in 1934 by a special court, but the punishment was never carried out.

In 1942, four years after Italy had enacted the Italian racial laws, Gozi issued Sammarinese racial law n.33, which prohibited interracial marriage, including between Jews and non-Jewish Sammarinese. By the end of 1942 Gozi ordered that all Jews of San Marino should be deported and jailed.

== Electoral history ==
=== Grand and General Council elections ===
Election	Party leader	Votes	%	Seats	+/–	Position
1923	Giuliano Gozi	1,437	100% as part of the Bloc	29 / 60	▲29	▲1st
1926	Giuliano Gozi	2,444	100%	60 / 60	▲31	1st
1932	Giuliano Gozi	2,573	100%	60 / 60	Steady	1st
1938	Giuliano Gozi	2,916	100%	64 / 64	▲4	1st
