= Giuliano Gozi =

Sammarinese politician

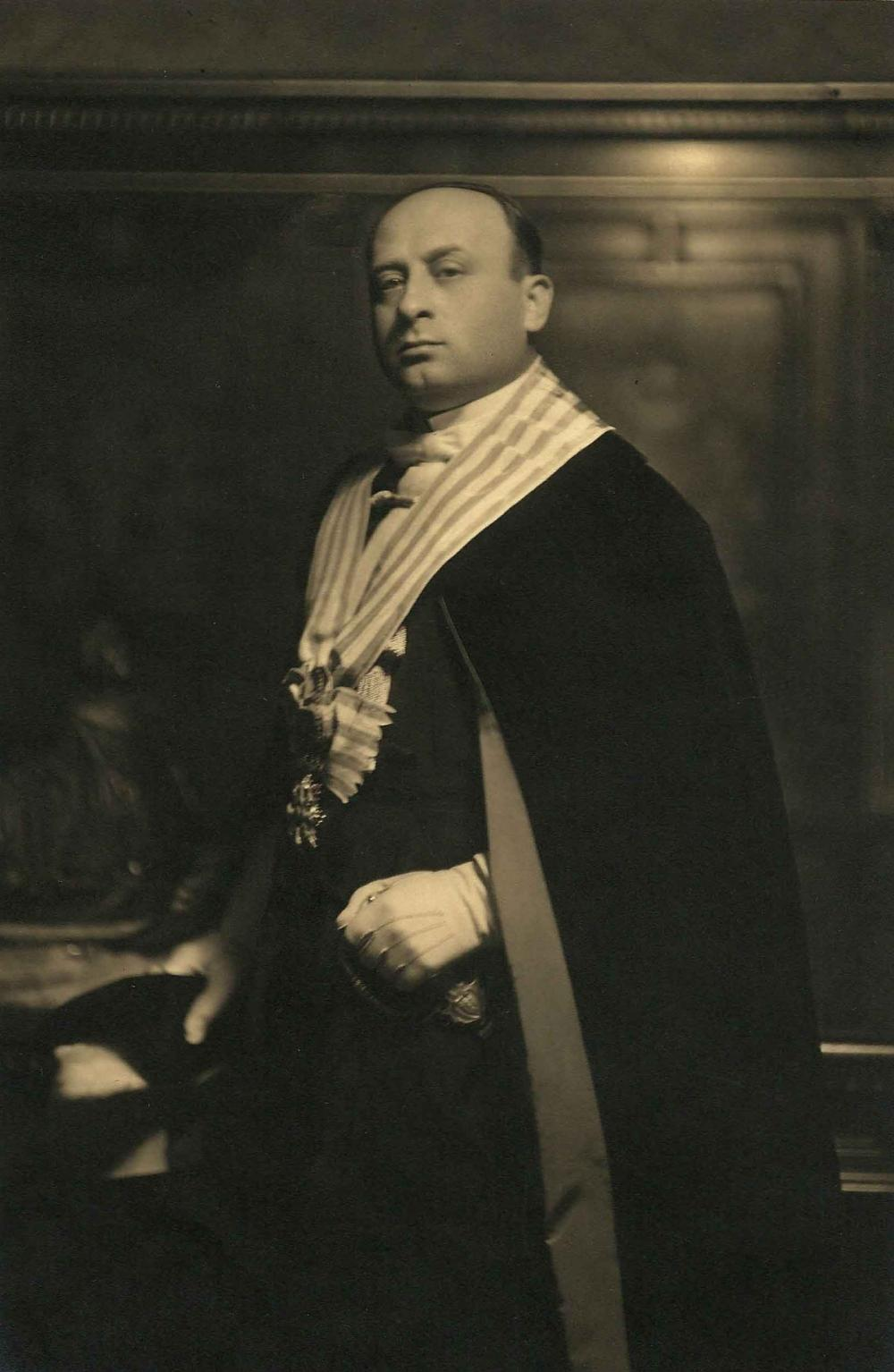

Captain Regent of San Marino
- In office 1 April 1923 – 1 October 1923 Serving with Filippo Mularoni
- In office 1 October 1926 – 1 April 1927 Serving with Ruggero Mori
- In office 1 April 1932 – 1 October 1932 Serving with Pompeo Righi
- In office 1 April 1937 – 1 October 1937 Serving with Settimio Belluzzi
- In office 1 October 1941 – 1 April 1942 Serving with Giovanni Lonfernini

Secretary of State for Foreign Affairs
- In office 30 April 1918 – 1943

Leader of the Sammarinese Fascist Party
- In office 10 August 1922 – 16 November 1944
- Preceded by: Position established
- Succeeded by: Party dissolved

Personal details
- Born: 7 August 1894 City of San Marino, Republic of San Marino
- Died: 18 January 1955 (aged 60) City of San Marino, Republic of San Marino
- Party: Sammarinese Fascist Party

Giuliano Gozi (7 August 1894 – 18 January 1955) was Secretary for Foreign Affairs and de facto Fascist leader of San Marino from 1918 until 1943. He also held the role of Captain-Regent of San Marino 5 times between 1923 and 1942.

== Early life ==
Gozi obtained a bachelor's degree in law at the University of Bologna 1914–1915. When Italy entered World War I in 1915, he joined the Royal Italian Army. In November 1915 he was deployed as a member of the Alpini to the front in the Valle del Boite and on the Tofane, where he obtained the Bronze Medal of Military Valor.

In 1916 he was promoted to lieutenant. He was involved in the suppression of anti-war riots in Turin in the summer of 1917. Following the Italian loss at the Battle of Caporetto in November 1917, he returned to the front with the 6th Monte Pasubio Battalion of the Alpini and participated in the Battle of Monte Grappa against the Central Powers.

By the end of the war Gozi had received the Gold Medal of Military Valor, Silver Medal of the Italian Red Cross, the Silver Medal of the Republic of San Marino and the Allied Victory Medal.

== Career ==
The Sammarinese Grand and General Council appointed Gozi as Secretary for Foreign Affairs. He was effectively the leader of San Marino until he left this post in 1943. On 10 August 1922 Gozi founded the Sammarinese Fascist Party, and by the time of the 1923 general election, the party had become the sole legal party.

In 1939 he signed the Convention of friendship and good neighborliness with the king of Italy, Victor Emmanuel III, which remains in force to the present day. On 17 September 1942, four years after the Italians had enacted the Italian racial laws of 1938, Gozi issued racial law n.33, which prohibited marriage between Sammarinese and non-Europeans or Jews; marriages with non-Jewish Italians were still permitted.

A previous Giuliano Gozi was also Captain Regent of San Marino for 9 terms between 1768 and 1796.
