= Hanns Scharff =

German Luftwaffe interrogator (1907–1992)

Hanns-Joachim Gottlob Scharff
- Born: 16 December 1907; Rastenburg, East Prussia, Kingdom of Prussia, German Empire
- Died: 10 September 1992 (aged 84); Bear Valley Springs, Tehachapi, California, United States
- Military career
- Allegiance: Nazi Germany
- Branch: Heer, Luftwaffe
- Service years: 1942–45
- Rank: Hauptgefreiter
- Unit: Auswertestelle West
- Conflicts: World War II
- Other work: Textile salesman, South Africa (before World War II); Mosaic artist, United States (after World War II)

Hanns-Joachim Gottlob Scharff (16 December 1907 – 10 September 1992) was a German Luftwaffe interrogator during the Second World War. He has been called the "Master Interrogator" of the Luftwaffe, and possibly all of Nazi Germany; he has also been praised for his contribution to shaping U.S. interrogation techniques after the war. As a Hauptgefreiter (approximately equivalent to NATO rank code OR-3), he was responsible for interrogating captured American fighter pilots after he became an interrogation officer in 1943. He has been highly praised for the success of his techniques, particularly because he never used physical means to obtain the required information. Scharff's interrogation techniques were so effective that he was occasionally called upon to assist other German interrogators in their questioning of Allied bomber pilots and aircrews, including those crews and fighter pilots from countries other than the United States. Additionally, he was charged with questioning many more important prisoners who were funnelled through the interrogation center, such as senior officers and famous flying aces.

In 1948, Scharff was invited by the United States Air Force to lecture on his interrogation techniques and first-hand experiences. The U.S. military later incorporated his methods into its curriculum at its interrogation schools. Many of his methods are still taught in U.S. Army interrogation schools. Scharff was granted immigration status.

From the 1950s until he died in 1992, he redirected his efforts to creating mosaics. He became a world-renowned mosaic artisan, with his artistic creations commissioned for the California State Capitol; Los Angeles City Hall; several schools, colleges, and universities, including the giant Outdoor Mosaic Mural façade of the Utah Tech University Fine Arts Center; EPCOT Center; and in the 15-foot arched mosaic walls featuring the story of Cinderella inside Cinderella Castle at Walt Disney World, Florida.

== Biography ==
=== Early life ===
Scharff was born on 16 December 1907, in Rastenburg, East Prussia (now Kętrzyn, Poland), to Hans Hermann Scharf and Else Scharf (née Jahn) and was the second of three sons, the elder being Eberhardt and the younger, Wolfgang, who died in his teens. Hanns Scharff added an extra 'f' to the end of his last name as an adult; some ancestors spelled their last names that way.

Scharff's father, a Prussian Army officer before and during the First World War, died in 1917 in Wiesbaden from wounds received during World War I on the Western Front in France in July 1916. He was the recipient of the Iron Cross (I and II Class), the Reuss Cross, and the Hanseatic Cross, "all for bravery in combat," of which his son was immensely proud.

Scharff's mother was the daughter of one of the founders of one of Germany's largest textile mills. Her father, Christian G. Jahn, lived at the spacious Villa Jahn in Greiz, adjacent to the family's large textile factory compound. After Hans Hermann Scharff's first stint in the army before World War I, he joined Christian Jahn as a partner in the textile business, moving his family into the Villa Jahn to live with his father-in-law. His son, Hanns Scharff, was raised in the Villa Jahn until adulthood and schooled in Leipzig. During his schooling there, he was first trained in various forms of art, which eventually served as a basis for his profession after World War II.

=== Pre-war career ===
Scharff's older brother, Eberhardt, was expected to take over the textile business from his grandfather, Jahn. Hanns was also encouraged to learn the family business and trained for three years in textiles and weaving while still a teenager. Next, he was trained in merchandizing and marketing, and finally exporting. Scharff then traveled to work in the Adlerwerke Foreign Office in Johannesburg, South Africa, to gain experience in sales (specifically of the Adler automobiles produced in Frankfurt) for one year. However, he was so successful at his job that, instead of returning to Germany, he was promoted to Director of the Overseas Division and continued to make Johannesburg his home for the next ten years leading up to the outbreak of World War II.

While in South Africa, Scharff met and married a South African British woman, Margaret Stokes. Margaret was the daughter of Captain Claud Stokes, first a pilot in Rhodesia in 1913, and later a squadron leader and flying ace in the Royal Flying Corps.

=== World War II ===
==== Pre–Auswertestelle West military career ====
Scharff was visiting Greiz during the summer of 1939 when World War II broke out. Because of the war and inability to travel, he was more or less stranded in Germany. After finding work in Berlin and while living in Berlin with his wife and their three children, he was drafted into the Wehrmacht; he subsequently trained for two months in Potsdam. Scharff was originally to be posted to the Russian Front. However, when Margaret Scharff learned of her husband's destination, she intervened, angry at the thought of a fluent English-speaking German soldier's life being wasted at the Eastern Front. She talked her way into the office of a German general in Berlin and pleaded her husband's case, convincing the general of the error which was about to take place. The general sent a telegram to Scharff's panzer unit, informing his superiors that Scharff was to be transferred immediately to the Dolmetscher Kompanie XII (Interpreters Company 12), based in Wiesbaden, to serve as a German/English interpreter. He had been slated to leave for the Russian Front the morning the telegram arrived. His fellow grenadiers were sent on to Russia.

After traveling by train to Wiesbaden, Scharff asked at the train station where Dolmetscher Kompanie XII was based, not having been given any indication of its location before leaving his panzer unit. Unfamiliar with Kompanie XII, the Military Police at the train station directed Scharff to report to another panzergrenadier battalion destined for the Eastern Front. Frustrated and concerned over his new battalion's unwillingness to transfer him to his correct unit, Scharff recalled his father's letter to each of his boys shortly before he died. In the letter, his father told him that, should he ever need help or guidance, he should contact one or both of his dearest friends in his regiment, Majors Ledebur and Postel. Scharff contacted then-Lieutenant Colonel Postel, who agreed to take his situation up with the commanding general, whom he knew personally. The next morning, the general telephoned the panzer unit and ordered that Scharff be released to his proper unit.

After arriving at Kompanie XII in Mainz, Scharff trained in British nuances and military organization. During the spring of 1943, he was promoted to Hauptgefreiter and transferred to headquarters in Wiesbaden. Unsatisfied with his job of "manufactur[ing] little round holes" as a clerk at headquarters, he joked to the adjutant that he had figured out that the cost of each hole he punched was five pfennig. The adjutant informed the general of Scharff's calculations, and the general summoned Scharff and told him that he did not like low-ranking personnel "figuring out costs that were none of their business." However, after hearing Scharff's story, the general agreed to send him – only one of three allowed per year – to the Luftwaffe interrogation center at Oberursel to interpret for the interrogators.

==== Auswertestelle West Interrogation Officer ====
The Luftwaffe interrogation centre at Oberursel, just north of Frankfurt, was officially known as Auswertestelle West (Intelligence and Evaluation Center West). It served as the initial in-processing and interrogation centre for all captured Allied Air Force personnel, except for Soviet aircrews, who were interrogated elsewhere. Upon arrival, Scharff began in the Camp Office – Reception and was eventually promoted by the Chief of the Fighter Interrogation Section, Hauptmann Horst H. "Big Chief" Barth, to assistant interrogation officer of the American Fighters section responsible for the 8th and 9th Air Forces. It was during his training as an assistant interrogation officer that Scharff claims he learned his interrogation techniques through observation; he was never formally trained.

He assisted two interrogators named Weyland and Schröder who interrogated USAAF fighter pilots. While Scharff was on leave in late 1943, Weyland and Schröder went up in a Fieseler Storch aircraft with a Luftwaffe fighter pilot from the Kampfgeschwader 27 unit at Eschborn Airbase. The aircraft's engine malfunctioned, and the plane crashed, killing the pilot and Schröder and mortally injuring Weyland. The accident prompted Barth to promote Scharff to interrogation officer of the USAAF Fighter Section; he was also officially transferred from the Army to the Luftwaffe but was not promoted in rank. He was later provided with an assistant interrogator, Otto "Canadian Wild Bill" Engelhardt.

==== Technique ====
Scharff was opposed to physically abusing prisoners to obtain information. Learning on the job, he instead relied upon the Luftwaffe's approved list of techniques, mostly making the interrogator seem like his prisoner's greatest advocate while in captivity. Scharff described various experiences with new POWs (prisoners of war), outlining the procedure most of his fellow interrogators were instructed to use. Initially, the POWs' fear and sense of disorientation, combined with isolation while not in interrogation, were exploited to gain as much initial biographical information as possible. A prisoner was frequently warned that unless he could produce information beyond names, ranks, and serial numbers, such as the name of his unit and airbase, the Luftwaffe would have no choice but to assume he was a spy and turn him over to the Gestapo for questioning. For Scharff, this technique worked quite well. In addition to initially preying upon his prisoners' fears of the infamous Gestapo, he portrayed himself as their closest ally in their predicament, telling them that while he would like nothing more than to see them safely deposited in a POW camp; his hands, he claimed, were tied unless the prisoner gave him the few details that he requested to help him correctly identify the prisoner as a true POW.

After a prisoner's fear had been allayed, Scharff acted as a good friend, including sharing jokes, homemade food items, and occasionally alcoholic beverages. He was fluent in English and knowledgeable about British and some American customs, which helped him gain the trust and friendship of many of his prisoners. In addition, he could empathize with the captured Allied aviators, drawing on the fact that he was not only married to an Englishwoman but also a son-in-law of a World War I British flying ace (Claud Stokes, as noted above). Some high-profile prisoners were treated to outings to German airfields (one POW was even allowed to take a Bf 109 fighter for a trial run), tea with German fighter aces, swimming pool excursions, and luncheons, among other things. Prisoners were treated well, medically speaking, at the nearby Hohe Mark Hospital, and some POWs were occasionally allowed to visit their comrades at this hospital for company's sake, as well as the better meals provided there. Scharff was best known for taking his prisoners on strolls through the nearby woods, first having them swear an oath of honor that they would not attempt to escape during their walk. He chose not to use these nature walks as a time to ask his prisoners obvious military-related questions directly but instead relied on the POWs' desire to speak to anyone outside of isolated captivity about informal, generalized topics. Prisoners often volunteered information the Luftwaffe had instructed Scharff to acquire, frequently without realizing they had done so.

The Luftwaffe kept a vast collection of personal information about any pilot or commander in an enemy air wing in individual files. When faced with a tight-lipped prisoner, Scharff usually consulted these files during interrogation sessions. He began by asking a prisoner a question he already knew the answer to, informing the prisoner that he knew everything about him, but his superiors had instructed that the prisoner himself had to say it. Scharff continued asking questions that he would then provide the answers for, each time hoping to convince his captive that there was nothing he did not already know. When he eventually got to the piece of information he did not have, prisoners would frequently answer, assuming Scharff already had it in his files anyway, often saying so as they provided the information. Scharff kept the Luftwaffe's lack of knowledge a strict secret to exploit the same tactic in later conversations.

==== Scharff's prisoners ====
Scharff interrogated many prisoners over his few years as an interrogator at Auswertestelle West. Among the most famous of these was Lt. Col. Francis "Gabby" Gabreski, the top American fighter ace in Europe during the war. Scharff expressed his delight at finally meeting Gabreski, who had crashed his P-47 while strafing a German airfield, as he stated he had been expecting his arrival for some time. He had Gabreski's photo hanging on the wall in his office for months before he arrived in anticipation of his capture and interrogation. Gabreski is one of the few captives from whom Scharff never gained any intelligence during interrogation. Scharff and Gabreski remained friends well after the war. In 1983, they reenacted an interrogation at a reunion held in Chicago of Stalag Luft III POWs.

Scharff also interrogated Col. Hubert Zemke, Maj. Duane Beeson, Capt. John T. Godfrey, Col. Charles W. Stark, Maj. Gerald W. Johnson, and Col. Einar Axel Malmstrom, amongst many others.

He was also asked to interrogate Lt. Martin J. Monti, who later pleaded guilty to treason against the United States for his activities during the war. Scharff was asked to testify during his trial in the U.S. in 1948.

==== Immigration to the U.S. ====
Scharff came to the United States in 1948 when asked to testify in Lt. Monti's treason trial. While there, he met with various USAF officials and lectured about prisoner interrogation techniques at the Pentagon and other locales.

=== The Interrogator ===
Following the war and his moving to the U.S., Scharff began to write his memoirs of his time as a Luftwaffe interrogator. He reportedly never meant for his writings to be seen by anyone but himself. He chose select sections to publish in Argosy Magazine in 1950 in the form of a brief article titled "Without Torture". In the 1970s, military author Raymond Toliver contacted Scharff and asked if he could collaborate with him to publish what Scharff had written about his wartime experiences. Toliver examined what Scharff had written and contacted many of the associates and former prisoners Scharff spoke about in his writings to verify what Scharff had claimed. Many of those contacted wrote letters to Toliver in return, which he then published in the book chronologically alongside what Scharff had written. In addition, Toliver researched Scharff's life before, during, and after the war, essentially writing a nearly complete biography of Scharff in addition to Scharff's personal thoughts. The book was published in 1978 under the title The Interrogator: the Story of Hanns Scharff, Luftwaffe's Master Interrogator. It was republished by a different publisher in 1997.

=== Mosaic creation ===
After immigrating to the United States following World War II, Scharff fell back upon the artistic influences and training he had acquired during his youth in Germany and began creating mosaic art and furniture products decorated with mosaics for sale within the New York City area. Reportedly instantly successful, he expanded his business to locations around the U.S. Now financially successful, he moved it to Los Angeles, California, less than a decade after starting it. His new business, Hanns Scharff Designs, did even more business in the private, public, and business realms, with each design making his name and work better known and popular.

In 1971, Scharff invited his daughter-in-law, Monika Scharff, to study under him alongside other mosaic artists in his expanding business. Both Scharffs created one of the most well-known mosaics associated with Scharff's business, the five 15 ft (4.6 m) wall mosaics telling the story of Cinderella in the Cinderella Castle at Walt Disney World in Orlando, Florida.

Among the many commissions Scharff received, he and his studio created the marbled mosaic floor in the California state capitol building, the mosaic entry ramps at Disney's Epcot Center in Florida, a large outdoor building facade mosaic at Utah Tech University (formerly Dixie College) in Utah, and the mosaiced eagle floor at the University of Southern California campus, in addition to several other private homes, hotels, schools, universities, department stores, shopping malls and churches worldwide.

In the mid-1980s, Scharff asked Monika to be his business partner, forming the new "Scharff & Scharff". The two Scharffs continued to work together, expanding their business, until the elder Scharff's death on September 10, 1992. Monika continued their business as "Scharff & Scharff" until she died in 2022.

== Impact on modern interrogation ==
The High-Value Interrogation Group was established in 2009 and has investigated Scharff's techniques. The FBI and others have now adopted the technique, and research of the technique funded by the High-Value Interrogation Group was published in 2015.

A meta-analysis found that Scharff's techniques tended to elicit more new information, while also making sources see the interviewer as more knowledgeable and underestimate how much they had revealed.

== In popular culture ==
Hanns Scharff was portrayed by Saro Emirze in the 2024 Apple TV miniseries Masters of the Air.
