= Claud Stokes =

British World War I flying ace

Claud Harry Stokes
- Born: 16 March 1884; Blackheath, London, England
- Died: 7 November 1918 (aged 34)
- Burial place: Erquelinnes Communal Cemetery, Belgium
- Military career
- Allegiance: United Kingdom
- Branch: British Army; Royal Air Force
- Service years: 1916–1918
- Rank: Captain
- Units: No. 41 Squadron RFC; No. 57 Squadron RFC/RAF
- Conflicts: World War I • Western Front
- Awards: Distinguished Flying Cross

Captain Claud Harry Stokes DFC (16 March 1884 – 7 November 1918) was a British First World War flying ace credited with five aerial victories, all while flying the Airco DH.4.

== Biography ==
Stokes was born in Blackheath in south-east London, the youngest son of Henry and Harriet Stokes. From 1910 he worked as a mechanical engineer in Rhodesia, before returning to England with his wife and family in 1916.

He was commissioned as a second lieutenant (on probation) in the Royal Flying Corps on 3 June 1916. He was granted his Royal Aero Club Aviator's Certificate and appointed a flying officer on 24 August, and was confirmed in his rank on 19 September. Stokes was posted to No. 41 Squadron RFC on 15 October 1916, but was injured after only five days in action and returned to England. After his recovery he served as an instructor, being appointed a Wing Instructor in Gunnery, graded as a flight commander with the acting rank of captain on 3 February 1917. He was appointed an instructor in Gunnery, graded as an Equipment Officer 1st Class, on 5 June.

Stokes was promoted to lieutenant on 3 December 1917, and on 2 January 1918 was appointed a flight commander with the acting rank of captain to serve in No. 57 Squadron RFC. He was credited with five victories while flying an Airco DH.4 light bomber; firstly a Pfalz D.III on 19 June 1918, and then a Fokker D.VII on 23 June, two more on 16 September, and finally another D.VII on 21 September 1918.

On the afternoon of 29 October 1918 his aircraft was hit by anti-aircraft fire over Maubeuge, France, and crashed behind the German lines. Stokes was badly injured and died as a result of his wounds on 7 November. His observer, Second Lieutenant Leslie Harvey Eyres (of MacGregor, Man., Canada) survived and was taken prisoner. Stokes was buried by the Germans in the cemetery at Erquelinnes, Belgium.

Stokes was posthumously awarded the Distinguished Flying Cross on 1 January 1919, and received a mention in dispatches for "valuable services rendered during the War" on 3 June 1919.

Somewhat ironically, his daughter, Margaret, would later marry a German living in South Africa, Hanns Scharff who, after being stranded back in Germany due to the outbreak of the Second World War, became the chief interrogator of the German Luftwaffe, responsible for interrogating captured Allied air force officers.

== List of aerial victories ==
Combat record
No.	Date/Time	Aircraft/ Serial No.	Opponent	Result	Location	Notes
1	19 June 1918 @ 1930	D.H.4 (D8398)	Pfalz D.III	Out of control	Bapaume	Observer: Captain J. H. Bowler.
2	23 June 1918 @ 1510	D.H.4 (D8398)	Fokker D.VII	Out of control	Le Transloy	Observer: Second Lieutenant T. C. Danby.
3	16 September 1918 @ 1215	D.H.4 (D8398)	Fokker D.VII	Out of control	Havrincourt Wood	Observer: Lieutenant R. D. Bovill.
4	16 September 1918 @ 1215	D.H.4 (D8398)	Fokker D.VII	Out of control	Havrincourt Wood	Observer: Lieutenant R. D. Bovill.
5	21 September 1918 @ 1835	D.H.4 (D8398)	Fokker D.VII	Out of control	North of Fontaine-Notre Dame	Observer: Lieutenant R. D. Bovill.
