= Joseph C. McConnell =

American fighter pilot

Joseph Christopher McConnell Jr.
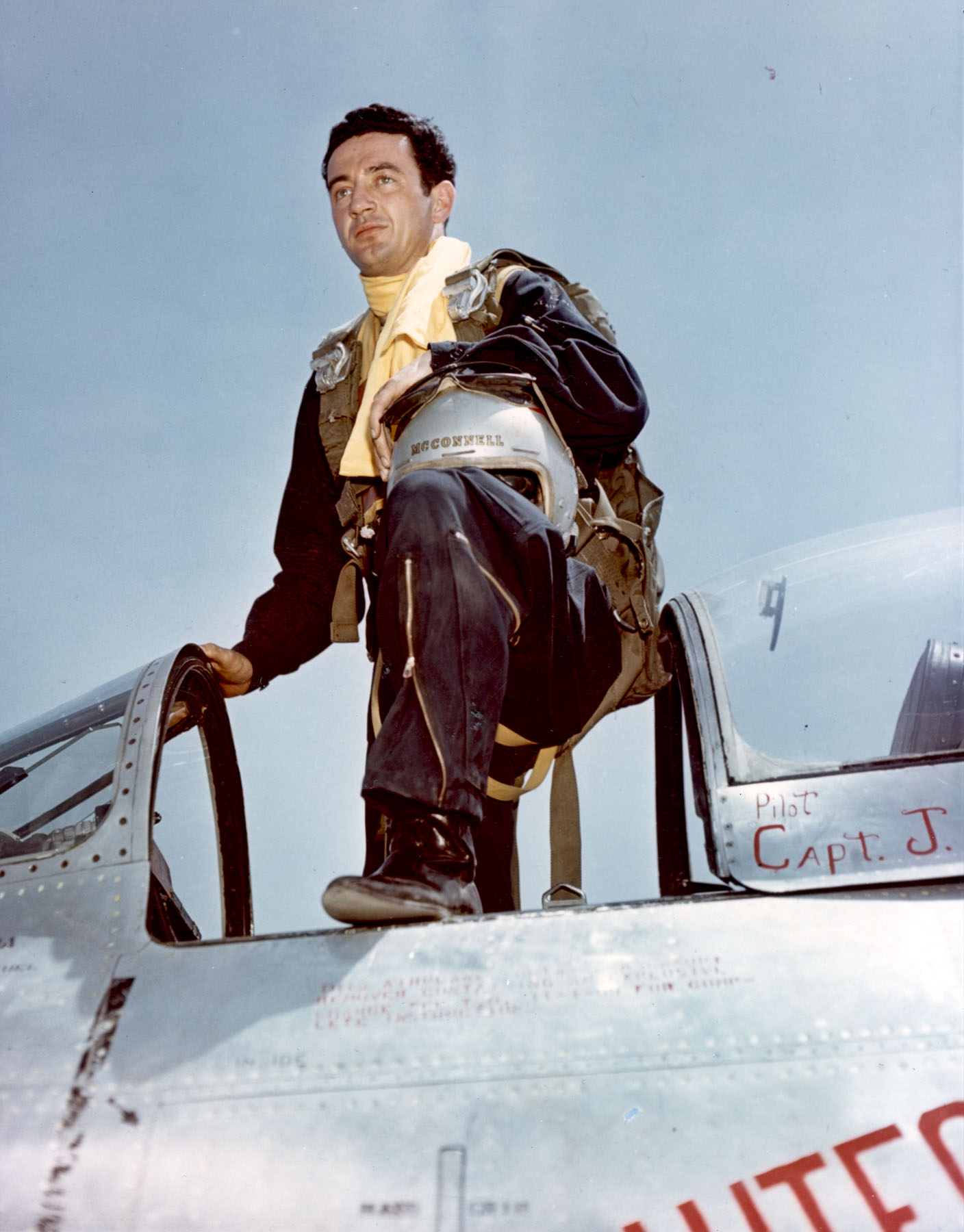
- McConnell with his F-86, Beauteous Butch II, following his last mission in Korea
- Born: January 30, 1922; Dover, New Hampshire
- Died: August 25, 1954 (aged 32); Edwards Air Force Base, California
- Burial place: Victor Valley Memorial Park, Victorville, California
- Military career
- Allegiance: United States
- Branch: United States Army Air Forces; United States Air Force
- Service years: 1940–1954
- Rank: Captain
- Units: 448th Bomb Group; 51st Fighter-Interceptor Wing
- Conflicts: World War II; Korean War
- Awards: Distinguished Service Cross; Silver Star; Distinguished Flying Cross; Air Medal (4)

Joseph Christopher McConnell Jr. (30 January 1922 – 25 August 1954) was a United States Air Force fighter pilot who was the top American flying ace during the Korean War. A native of Dover, New Hampshire, Captain McConnell was credited with shooting down 16 MiG-15s while flying North American F-86 Sabres. He was awarded the Distinguished Service Cross, Silver Star, and the Distinguished Flying Cross for his actions in aerial combat. McConnell was the first American triple jet-on-jet fighter ace and is still the top-scoring American jet ace.

== Early life ==
McConnell was born on January 30, 1922, in Dover, New Hampshire. He enlisted in the U.S. Army on October 15, 1940, and served in the U.S. Army Medical Corps until entering the Aviation Cadet Program.

== Military service ==
=== World War II ===
McConnell entered the U.S. Army Air Forces Aviation Cadet Program in 1943 during World War II. His dream of becoming a pilot was dashed when, instead of being sent to pilot training, he was assigned to navigator training. He was commissioned a second lieutenant and received his navigator wings on September 18, 1944. He next completed Consolidated B-24 Liberator training and joined the 448th Bomber Group in England in January 1945. He flew 60 combat missions in Europe as a B-24 Liberator navigator. Research in 2023 by storiesofthe448th.com has shown this figure to be erroneous, the actual figure being much less. He remained in the Army Air Forces after the war and entered pilot training in 1946. McConnell finally achieved his goal of becoming a pilot, receiving his USAF pilot wings on February 25, 1948, at Williams AFB in Arizona. He then served in various fighter squadrons of the USAF.

=== Korean War ===
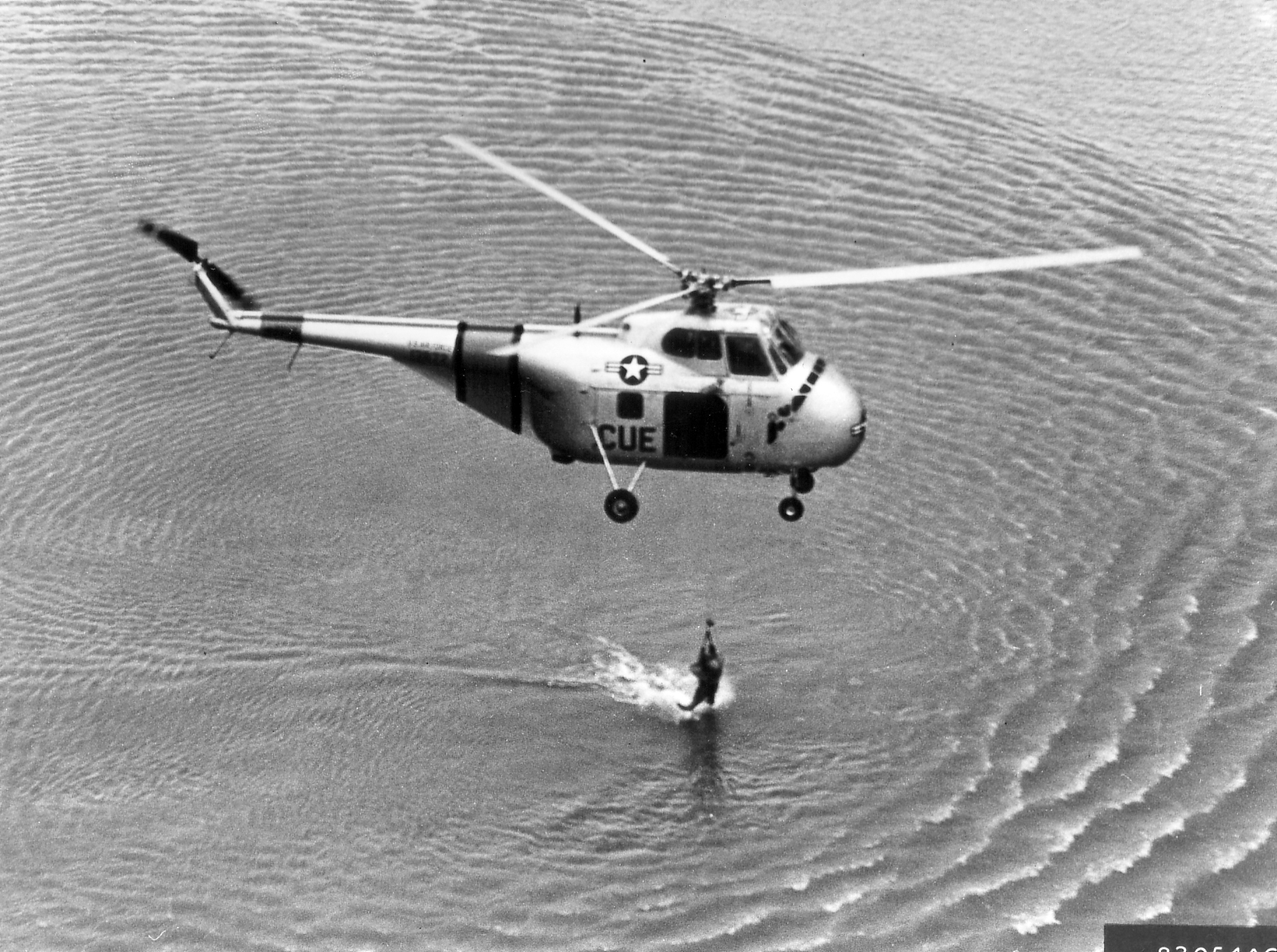
McConnell being rescued on 12 April 1953

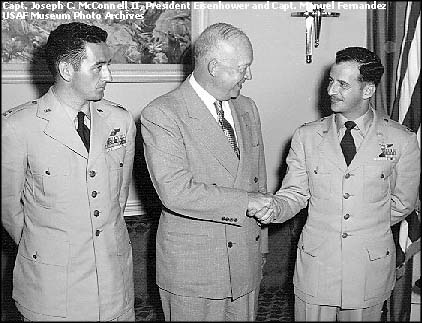
Air Force aces Joseph McConnell and Manuel "Pete" Fernandez meet with President Dwight D. Eisenhower at the White House in May 1953.

The Korean War began on 25 June 1950 when North Korea invaded South Korea. As the war continued to spread throughout the Korean peninsula, McConnell sought to become part of it. He was assigned to the 39th Fighter-Interceptor Squadron of the 51st Fighter-Interceptor Wing in Korea in September 1952. Gifted with exceptional eyesight, McConnell proved to be an aggressive MiG hunter, but he did not shoot down his first enemy aircraft until the following year. He scored all of his victories during a four-month period from 14 January to 18 May 1953.

Captain McConnell flew at least three different F-86 Sabres, all named "Beauteous Butch". The name referred to the nickname of his wife, Pearl "Butch" Brown. His first eight kills were scored in an F-86E-10 (serial number 51–2753, buzz number FU-753). The second Sabre was an F-86F-15 (serial number 51–12971, buzz number FU-971). McConnell shot down a MiG-15 piloted by Soviet ace Semyon Fedorets, however, his Sabre was also badly damaged and he was forced to bail out. This dramatic mutual kill started with the MiG-15 ambushing the Sabre and manage to damage the Sabre. McConnell reacted quickly and barrel-rolled to the Mig's six and blasted it out of the sky McConnell ejected over the Yellow Sea. He was rescued within minutes by an American helicopter. The next day he returned to the air and shot down another MiG. The final Sabre McConnell flew in combat was an F-86F-1 (serial number 51–2910, buzz number FU-910). This aircraft was repainted following his final mission, with the name being changed to "Beauteous Butch II". McConnell, during his last combat mission on 18 May 1953, destroyed two and damaged one of twenty-eight MiG-15 type aircraft over North Korea, bringing his total victory count to 16 destroyed plus 5 damaged and making him America's first triple jet ace. Immediately after his 16th air victory, McConnell was sent back to the United States, along with Manuel "Pete" Fernandez, the top Air Force ace (14.5 air victories) of the 4th Fighter-Interceptor Wing. McConnell met with the President at the White House and was awarded the Distinguished Service Cross (DSC) for his actions on 18 May 1953, America's second-highest decoration for valor.

It's the teamwork out here that counts. The lone wolf stuff is out.Your life always depends on your wingman and his life on you. I may get credit for a MiG, but it's the team that does it, not myself alone.

— Joseph C. McConnell, reflecting on his air victories

== Radio broadcast ==
Captain McConnell appeared as a contestant on the 10 February 1954 airing of the comedy quiz program "You Bet Your Life" starring Groucho Marx.

== Death ==
McConnell returned to his home in Apple Valley, California, and was stationed at George Air Force Base, California where he was assigned to the 445th Fighter Squadron and continued flying F-86s. On 6 August 1953, the people of Apple Valley gave a new home, the "Appreciation House", to Capt. McConnell. The house was completed in 45 hours with all land, material, and labor donated. In 1954, he was temporarily assigned to the service test program for the new F-86H Sabre. This was the last and most powerful version of the Sabre, and was intended to be a nuclear-capable fighter-bomber. On 25 August 1954, while testing the fifth production F-86H-1-NA (serial number 52-1981) at Edwards Air Force Base, McConnell was killed in a crash near the base following a control malfunction. The cause of the accident was attributed to an incorrectly installed bolt. Then-Major Chuck Yeager was assigned to investigate the crash and replicated the malfunction at a much higher altitude. This height advantage allowed him to safely regain control of the aircraft before it hit the desert floor.

The 1955 film The McConnell Story, starring Alan Ladd and June Allyson, chronicles his life story. The book Sabre Jet Ace (1959) by Charles Ira Coombs is a fictionalized biography for young readers covering his experiences as a fighter pilot in Korea.

McConnell's wife, Pearl "Butch" McConnell, died in 2008 at the age of 86. She never remarried and was buried with Captain McConnell at Victor Valley Memorial Park in Victorville, California.

== Military decorations ==

USAF Pilot badge
USAF Navigator badge
Distinguished Service Cross
Silver Star	Distinguished Flying Cross	Air Medal with three bronze oak leaf clusters
Air Force Presidential Unit Citation	Army Good Conduct Medal	American Defense Service Medal
American Campaign Medal	European-African-Middle Eastern Campaign Medal with two bronze campaign stars	World War II Victory Medal
National Defense Service Medal	Korean Service Medal with two bronze campaign stars	Air Force Longevity Service Award with two bronze oak leaf clusters
Republic of Korea Presidential Unit Citation	United Nations Korea Medal	Republic of Korea War Service Medal

=== Distinguished Service Cross citation ===
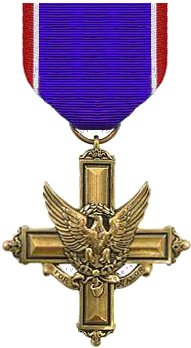
Distinguished Service Cross

Citation:

The President of the United States of America, under the provisions of the Act of Congress approved July 9, 1918, takes pleasure in presenting the Distinguished Service Cross to Captain Joseph McConnell Jr., United States Air Force, for extraordinary heroism in connection with military operations against an armed enemy of the United Nations while serving as a Pilot with the 39th Fighter-Interceptor Squadron, 51st Fighter-Interceptor Wing, FIFTH Air Force, in action against enemy forces in the Republic of Korea on 18 May 1953. Leading two F-86s on an air superiority mission over North Korea, he sighted a formation of twenty-eight MIG-15 type aircraft. Determined to accomplish his mission and with complete disregard for the numerical odds against him, he immediately attacked. Although under fire himself, he pressed his attack to such extent that he completely disorganized the enemy formation, destroying one of the MIGs and damaging another. Several enemy aircraft were then firing at him but, seeing that the other Sabre in his flight was also being fired upon, he completely ignored enemy cannon fire directed at himself and destroyed the MIG that was pursuing his wingman. These victories, in spite of counterattacks by such superior numbers, completely unnerved the enemy to the extent that they withdrew across the Yalu before further attacks could be made. Through his courage, keen flying ability and devotion to duty, Captain McConnell reflected great credit upon himself, the Far East Air Forces, and the United States Air Force.

== See also ==
- List of Korean War air aces
