= Kyle L. Riddle =

United States Air Force general

Kyle Loyd Riddle
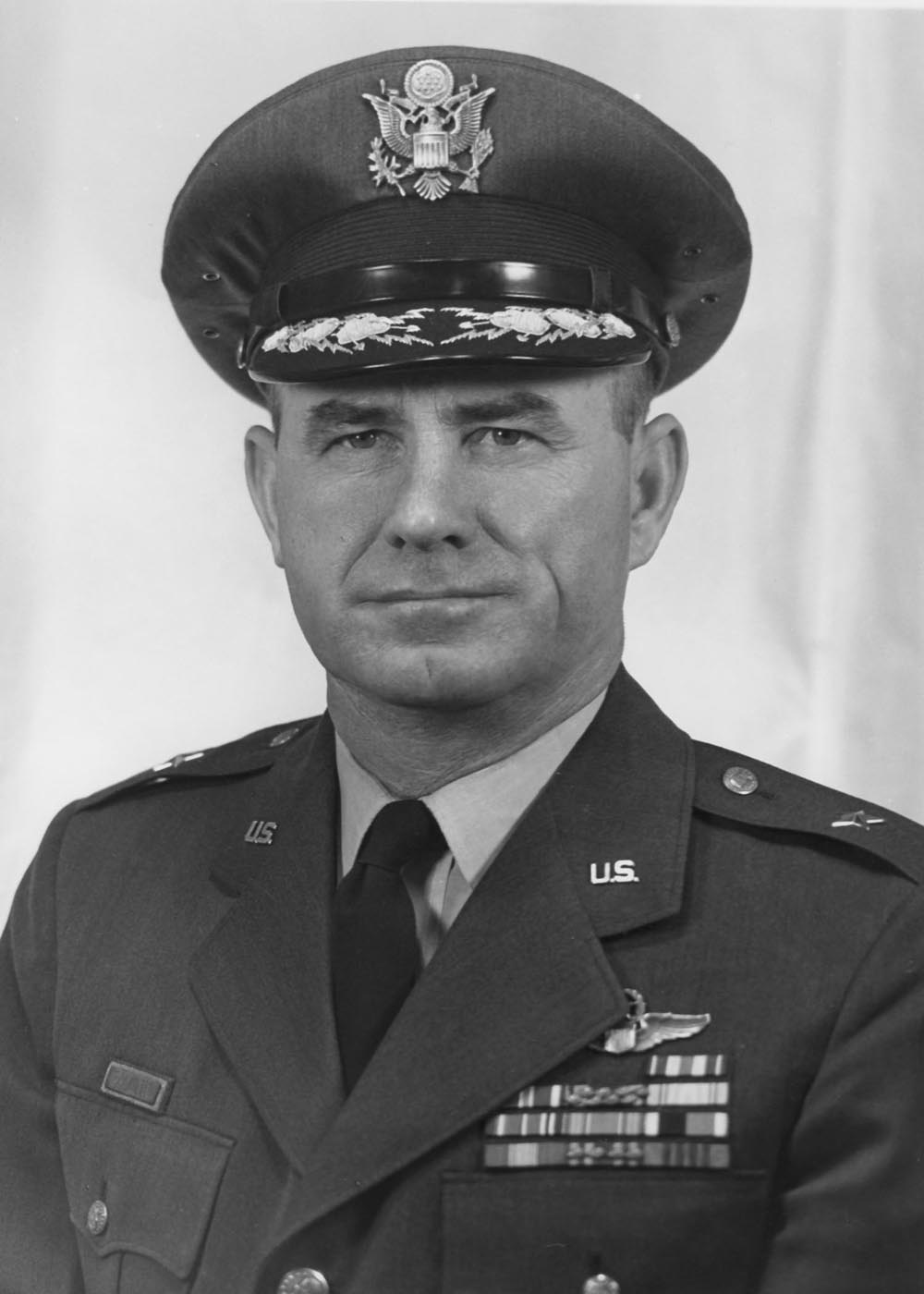
- Brigadier General Kyle Riddle
- Born: December 19, 1913; Decatur, Texas
- Died: November 16, 2008 (aged 94)
- Burial place: Fort Sam Houston National Cemetery
- Military career
- Commands: 479th Fighter Group

Kyle Loyd Riddle (December 19, 1913 – November 16, 2008) was a brigadier general in the United States Air Force. During World War II, he commanded the Eighth Air Force 479th Fighter Group which was known as "Riddle's Raiders".

== See also ==
- Hubert Zemke
