= 334th Fighter Squadron =

334th Fighter Squadron

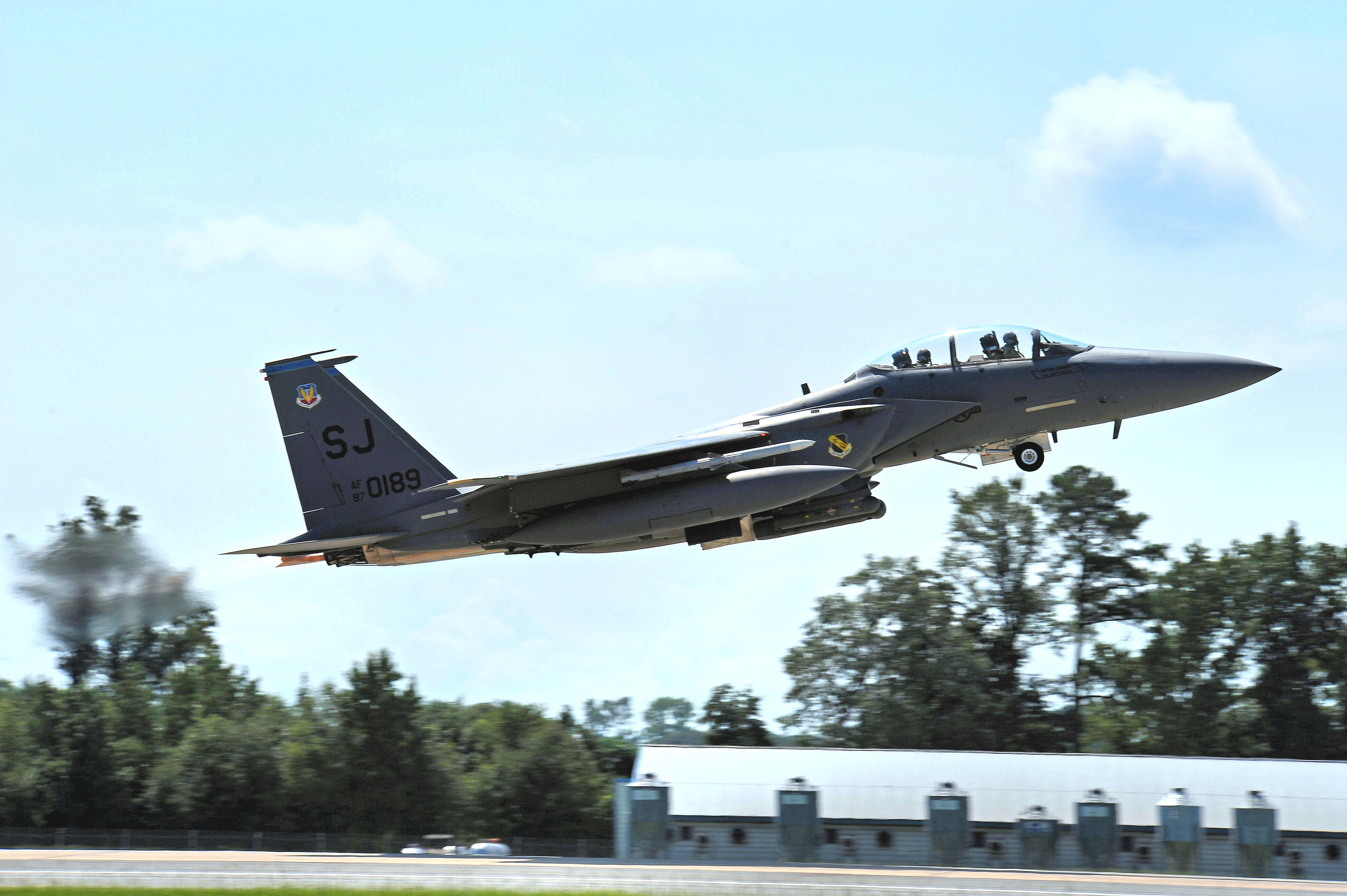
- 334th Fighter Squadron F-15E Strike Eagle taking off (Note: Aircraft is McDonnell Douglas F-15E-43-MC Strike Eagle serial 87-189.)
- Active: 1942–1945; 1946–present
- Country: United States
- Branch: United States Air Force
- Role: Attack
- Garrison/HQ: Seymour Johnson Air Force Base
- Nickname: Eagles
- Equipment: F-15E Strike Eagle
- Engagements: European Theater of Operations; Korean War; Vietnam War; Gulf War
- Decorations: Distinguished Unit Citation; Presidential Unit Citation; Air Force Outstanding Unit Award with Combat "V" Device; Air Force Meritorious Unit Award; Air Force Outstanding Unit Award; Republic of Korea Presidential Unit Citation; Republic of Vietnam Gallantry Cross with Palm

Commanders
- Current commander: Lt Col Dale Gogan
- Notable commanders: Lt Col Duane Beeson; Colonel Will Whisner; Lt Colonel George Davis; Lt General Michael C. Short; Lt General Norman Seip

Insignia
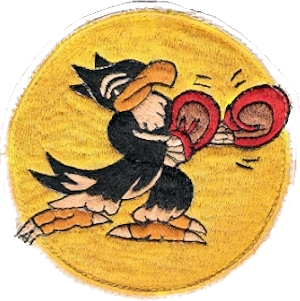
- 334th Fighter Squadron emblem (approved 27 September 1950)

The 334th Fighter Squadron is a United States Air Force unit. It is assigned to the 4th Operations Group and stationed at Seymour Johnson Air Force Base, North Carolina.

The 334th was constituted on 22 August 1942 as an incorporation of the No. 71 Squadron RAF, an Eagle Squadron of American volunteers in Great Britain's Royal Air Force. After the United States entered the war, the squadron was transferred to the U.S. Army Air Forces. It was officially constituted by War Department letter on 12 August 1942, and was activated at Bushey Hall, England on 12 September 1942.

== Overview ==
The "Eagles" fly the McDonnell Douglas F-15E Strike Eagle. Its aircraft are identified by the "SJ" tail code and blue fin flash.

Currently, the squadron provides worldwide deployable aircraft and personnel capable of executing combat missions in support of worldwide Aerospace Expeditionary Force deployments to combat areas as part of the global war on terrorism.

== History ==
=== World War II ===
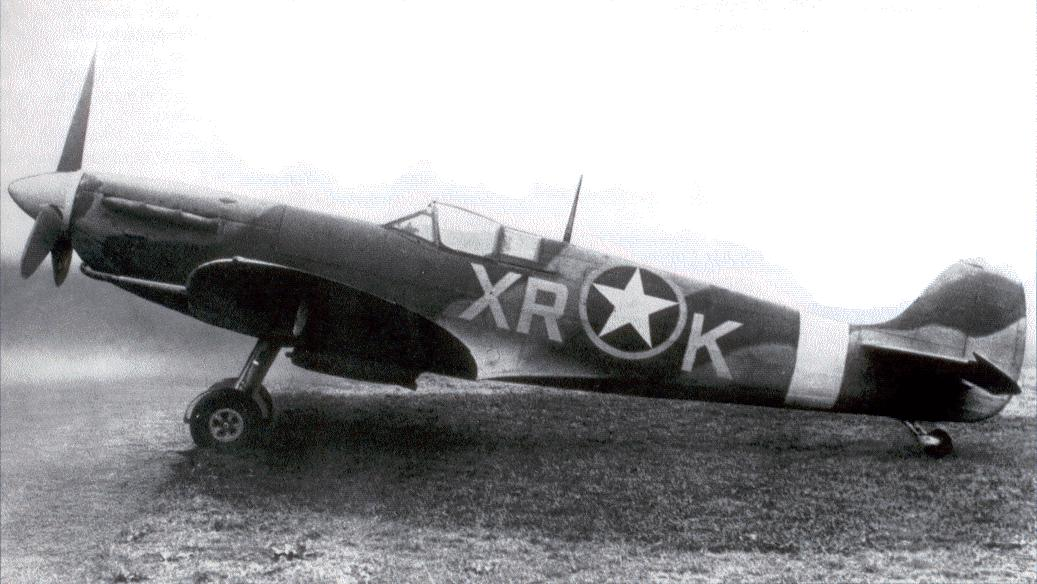
Supermarine Spitfire MK V of the 334th Fighter Squadron

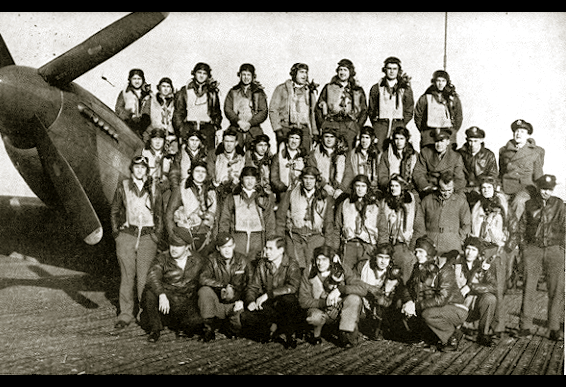
334th Fighter Squadron in January 1945

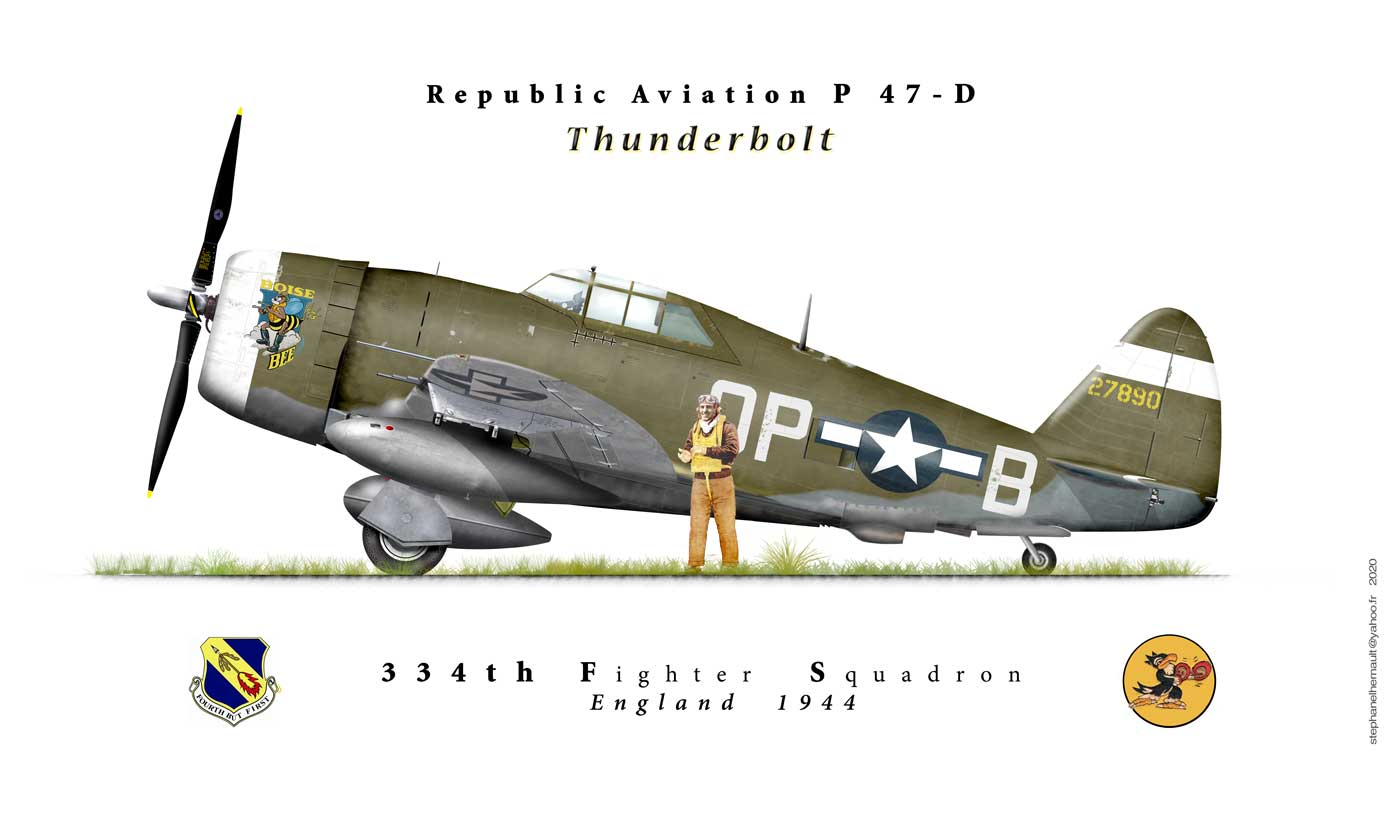
P47D 334th Fighter squadron 1944

The 334th, along with the 335th and 336th Fighter Squadrons, was assigned to the VIII Fighter Command 4th Fighter Group, which was the first United States Army Air Forces unit activated in the European Theater during World War II, which was located in Essex, England.

The 334th flew British Supermarine Spitfire fighters until the arrival of Republic P-47 Thunderbolt aircraft in 1943. After about a year the squadron switched to North American P-51 Mustangs. During World War II, the 334th had a total of 395 kills against the Luftwaffe; 210 kills in the air and 185 on the ground.

=== Korean War ===
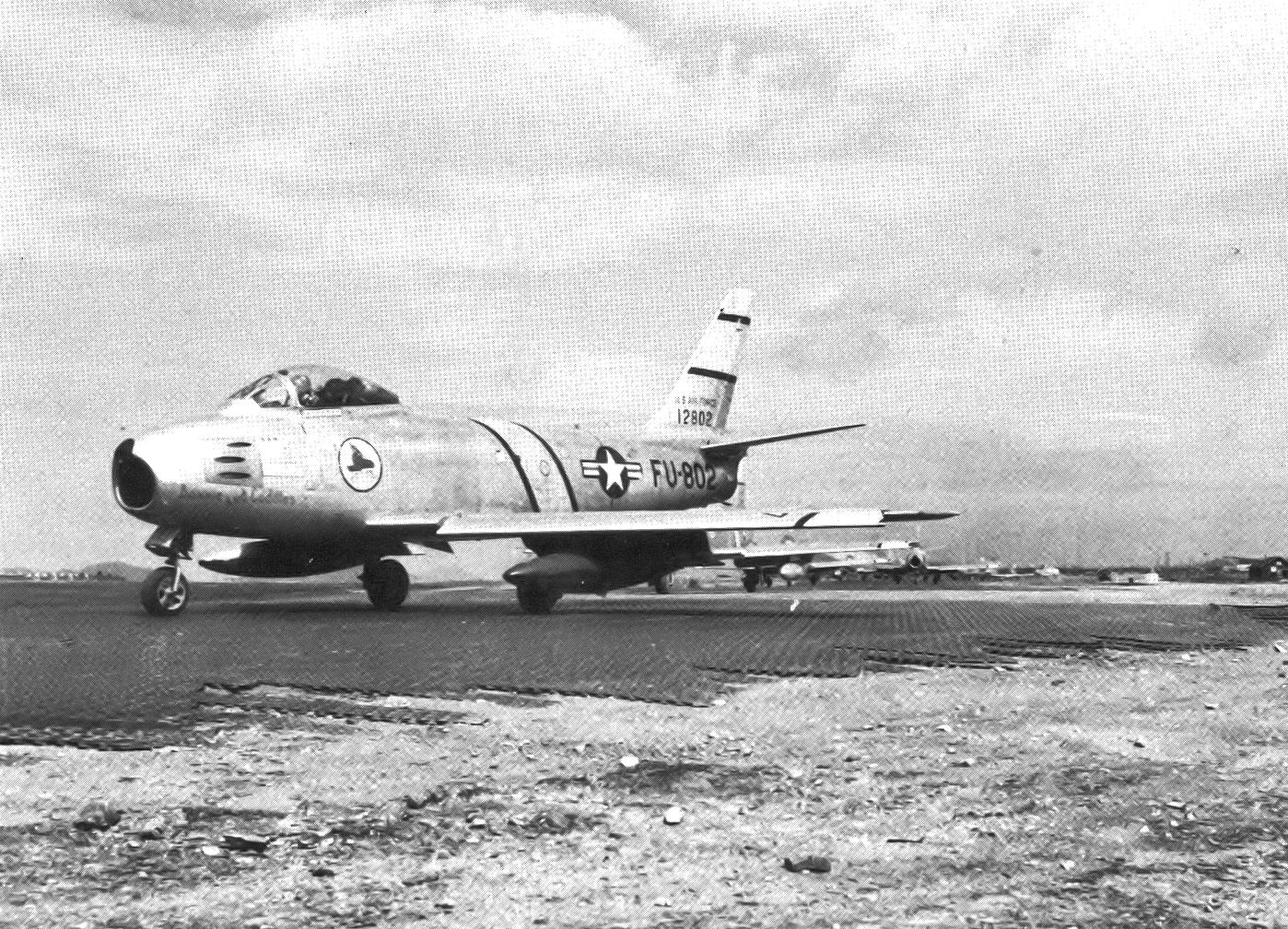
334th F-86E Sabre at Kimpo (Note: Aircraft is North American F-86E-10-NA Sabre serial 51-2802 named "Bonnie and Cuddles" in 1952.)

Equipped with the Lockheed F-80 Shooting Star, the 334th moved to Andrews Air Force Base in April 1947. In 1949 the 334th moved to Langley Air Force Base, where they were re-equipped with the North American F-86 Sabre.

In November 1950, the 334th were sent to the war in Korea. During the war they were credited with 142 kills, and they had six pilots who achieved ace status.

The 334th remained in Korea until 8 December 1957. They moved to Seymour Johnson Air Force Base as a unit of the 4th Fighter Wing. The 334th flew the North American F-100 Super Sabre until 1959, when the squadron transitioned to the Republic F-105 Thunderchief.

Major James Jabara, Captain Manuel J. "Pete" Fernandez, Major George A. Davis, Medal of Honor recipient, and Major Frederick "Boots" Blesse; the second, third, fourth and sixth (respectively) leading aces of the Korean War were assigned to the 334th. Future astronaut Captain Gus Grissom was assigned to the 334th during the Korean War.

=== Vietnam War ===
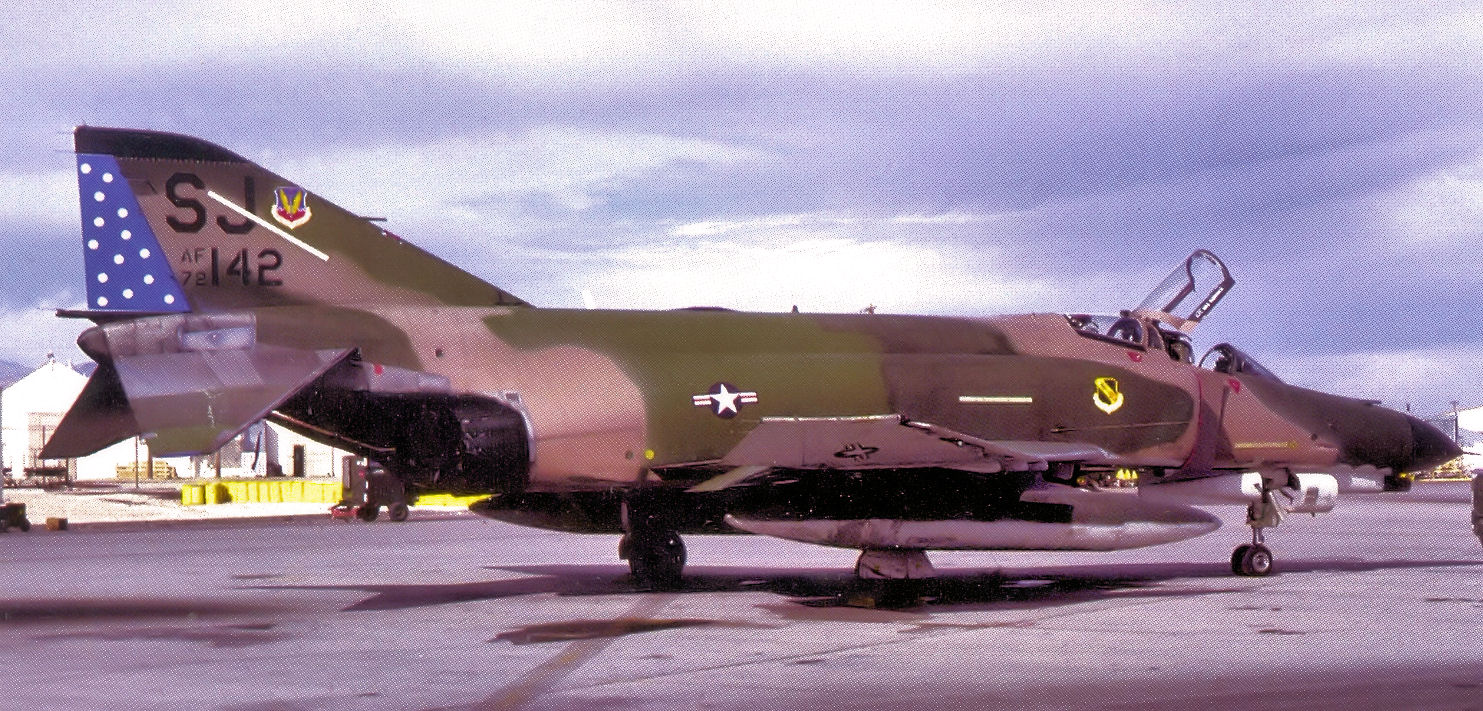
334th F-4E Phantom II at Seymour Johnson (Note: Aircraft is McDonnell Douglas F-4E-51-MC Phantom serial 72-142 in 1978. This airplane was retired to Aerospace Maintenance and Regeneration Center as FP0685 on 5 June 1991.)

In September 1965 the 334th relocated to Holmsted AFB because the runway at their home base Seymour Johnson AFB was being re-built. In August the 334th TFS moved to McConnell Air Force Base, Kansas and exchanged their F105Fs for F-105Ds, and flew non-stop to Hickam Air Force Base, then on to Anderson Air Force Base, Guam, and on to Takhli Royal Thai Air Force Base, Thailand. From Takhli combat missions were flown to North Vietnam and Laos. Being on temporary duty, the 334th left their Thuds to be part of the developing 355th Tactical Fighter Wing, and in February 1966 returned to Seymour-Johnson. In January 1968 the 334th went to Korea to support operations during the Pueblo incident. The 334th then returned to Seymour Johnson.

From February 1968 through June 1969, 4TFW Commander Colonel Chuck Yeager flew with the 334th as an 'attached' pilot.

In April 1972, in the midst of a Tactical Air Command ORI, the 334th TFS was deployed to Ubon AB, Thailand after which the squadron was attached to the 25th TFS. The unit began combat operations almost immediately. Soon after the deployment to SEA, the operations officer, Maj Tokanel, lobbied for missions specifically flagged for the 334th TFS. The unit was deployed through Linebacker I and Linebacker II, flying air-to-ground and air-to-air combat missions. The squadron was redeployed back to Seymour Johnson AFB in March 1973.

=== Gulf War ===
The 334th flew its first sorties with the McDonnell Douglas F-15E Strike Eagle on 1 January 1991. Throughout the month the 334th served as the host unit for multiple units deploying to Operation Desert Shield. Also, 334th aircrews and support personnel deployed to Operation Desert Storm as augmentees. On 18 June 1991, the squadron became operational on the F-15E, and deployed to Saudi Arabia the next day to relieve elements of the 335th Fighter Squadron, providing combat air patrol and ground alert forces supporting withdrawal of troops from Operation Desert Storm

== Lineage ==
- Constituted as the 334th Fighter Squadron on 22 August 1942

Activated on 12 September 1942
Redesignated 334th Fighter Squadron, Single Engine on 20 August 1943
Inactivated on 10 November 1945

- Activated on 9 September 1946

Redesignated: 334th Fighter Squadron, Jet Propelled on 23 April 1947
Redesignated: 334th Fighter Squadron, Jet on 14 June 1948
Redesignated: 334th Fighter-Interceptor Squadron on 20 January 1950
Redesignated: 334th Fighter-Bomber Squadron on 8 March 1955
Redesignated: 334th Fighter-Day Squadron on 25 April 1956
Redesignated: 334th Tactical Fighter Squadron on 1 July 1958
Redesignated: 334th Fighter Squadron on 1 November 1991

=== Assignments ===
- 4th Fighter Group, 12 September 1942 – 10 November 1945
- 4th Fighter Group (later 4th Fighter-Interceptor Group, 4th Fighter-Bomber Group, 4th Fighter-Day Group), 9 September 1946
- 4th Fighter-Day Wing (later 4th Tactical Fighter Wing, 4th Wing) 8 December 1957
  - (attached to 65th Air Division 1 April – 13 August 1963)
  - attached to the following PACAF organizations during the Viet Nam War:
    - (Seventeenth Air Force 15 February – 29 May 1965)
    - (355th Tactical Fighter Wing 2 September 1965 – 5 February 1966)
    - (354th Tactical Fighter Wing 16 December 1969-c. 31 May 1970)
    - (8th Tactical Fighter Wing 11 April – 5 August 1972 and 30 September 1972 – 18 March 1973)
  - attached to the following USAFE organization during the Cold War:
    - (86th Tactical Fighter Wing, 28 August– 29 September 1980, 26 August – 29 September 1981, and 22 May – 20 June 1984)
- 4th Operations Group, 22 April 1991 – present

=== Stations ===
- RAF Bushey Hall (AAF-341), England, 12 September 1942
- RAF Debden (AAF-356), England, 29 September 1942
- RAF Steeple Morden (AAF-122), England, c. 23 July – 4 November 1945
- Camp Kilmer, New Jersey, 9–10 November 1945
- Selfridge Field, Michigan, 9 September 1946
- Andrews Field (later Andrews Air Force Base), Maryland, 26 March 1947
- Langley Air Force Base, Virginia, 4 May 1949
- New Castle County Airport, Delaware, 13 August – 11 November 1950
- Johnson Air Base, Japan, 13 December 1950
- Taegu Air Base (K-2), South Korea, 23 February 1951
- Suwon Air Base (K-13), South Korea, 15 March 1951
- Johnson Air Base, Japan, 1 May 1951
- Kimpo Air Base (K-14), South Korea, 24 August 1951
- Chitose Air Base, Japan, 20 September 1954
- Misawa Air Base, Japan, 1 July – 8 December 1957
- Seymour Johnson Air Force Base, North Carolina, 8 December 1957 – present (deployed to McCoy Air Force Base, Florida 21 October – 29 November 1962, Moron Air Base, Spain 1 April – 13 August 1963, Incirlik Air Base, Turkey 15 February – 29 May 1965, Takhli Royal Thai Air Force Base, Thailand 2 September 1965 – 5 February 1966, Kunsan Air Base, South Korea 16 December 1969 – c. 31 May 1970, Ubon Royal Thai Air Force Base, Thailand 11 April – 5 August 1972 and 30 September 1972 – 18 March 1973, Ramstein Air Base, Germany 28 August – 29 September 1980, 26 August – 29 September 1981 and 22 May – 20 June 1984

=== Aircraft ===
- Supermarine Spitfire, 1942–1943
- Republic P-47 Thunderbolt, 1943–1944; 1947
- North American P-51 (later F-51) Mustang, 1944–1945, 1948–1949
- Lockheed P-80 Shooting Star, 1947–1949
- North American F-86 Sabre, 1949–1958
- North American F-100 Super Sabre, 1958–1960
- Republic F-105 Thunderchief, 1959–1966
- McDonnell F-4 Phantom II, 1969–1989
- McDonnell Douglas F-15E Strike Eagle, 1990–present

=== Notable squadron members ===
- Duane Beeson - World War II
- Art Donahue - World War II
- Ralph K. Hofer - World War II
- Chesley G. Peterson - World War II
- Steve Pisanos - World War II
- Frederick "Boots" Blesse - Korean War
- George A. Davis - Korean War
- Manuel J. "Pete" Fernandez - Korean War
- Gus Grissom - Korean War
- James Jabara - Korean War
- William T. Whisner Jr. - Korean War
- Ralph Parr - Korean War
- Chuck Yeager - Cold War-era
- Blair Hansen - Gulf War-era
- Ralph Jodice - Gulf War-era
- Norman Seip - Gulf War-era
- John N.T. "Jack" Shanahan - Gulf War-era
- Jay B. Silveria - Gulf War-era

=== Emblems ===
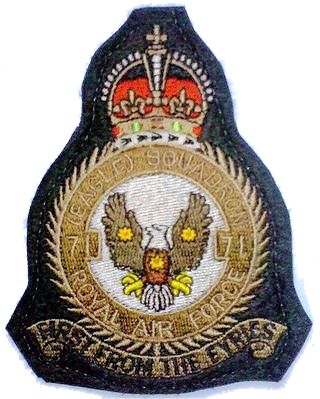
71 Eagle Squadron, RAF, 1940

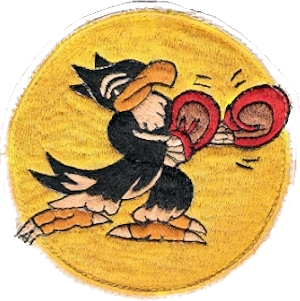
USAAF World War II 334th Fighter Squadron
