= Duane Beeson =

WWII American fighter pilot (1921–1947)

Duane Willard Beeson
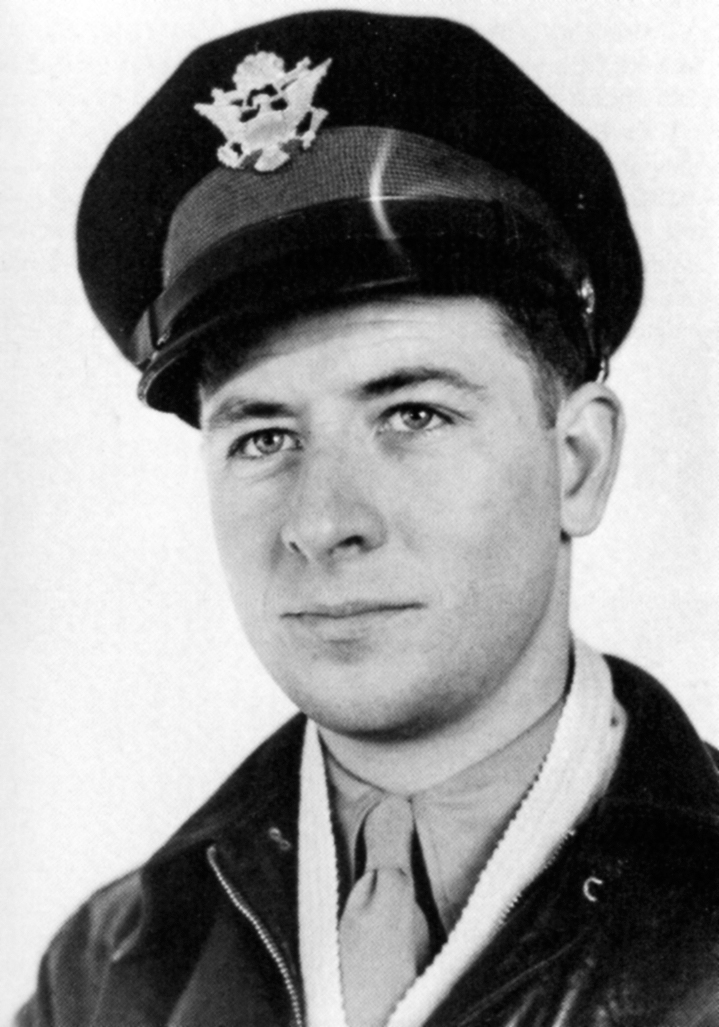
- Duane W. Beeson
- Born: July 16, 1921; Boise, Idaho, US
- Died: February 13, 1947 (aged 25); Walter Reed General Hospital; Washington, D.C., US
- Burial place: Arlington National Cemetery
- Relatives: Tracy Beeson, née Waters
- Military career
- Allegiance: Canada; United States
- Branch: Royal Canadian Air Force (1941–42); United States Army Air Forces (1942–47)
- Service years: 1941–1947
- Rank: Lieutenant Colonel
- Nickname: Bee
- Units: No 71 Eagle Squadron; 4th Fighter Group
- Commands: 334th Fighter Squadron
- Conflicts: World War II
- Awards: Distinguished Service Cross; Silver Star; Distinguished Flying Cross (6); Purple Heart; Air Medal (6)

Duane Willard Beeson (July 16, 1921 – February 13, 1947) was an American fighter pilot and flying ace of World War II. He scored 22.08 victories, including 17.3 air-to-air kills, 12 of which were scored in the P-47C/D Thunderbolt, and 5.3 of which were scored in the P-51-B Mustang. Beeson was one of ten United States Army Air Forces pilots who became an ace in two different types of fighter aircraft.

== Early life and education ==
Beeson was born on July 16, 1921, in Boise, Idaho. At Boise High School he joined the Junior Reserve Officers' Training Corps program as platoon bugler. Although slight in stature in high school, he was a member of a boxing club and played high school football.

By the spring of 1939 Beeson planned to study law at the University of California.

== Military career ==
Beeson planned to join the Army Air Corps as a pilot, but as he had not completed the required two years of college he joined the Royal Canadian Air Force in Canada, which had no such entry qualifications.

Beeson joined the Royal Canadian Air Force on June 23, 1941, in Vancouver and trained at Prince Albert and Yorkton, Saskatchewan. By February 26, 1942, Beeson had 201 hours of flight time and had successfully completed the training curriculum with a rating of "A good average pilot and is slightly overconfident. No outstanding faults." Beeson was posted to Bournemouth, England, and started conversion to the Hawker Hurricane. On September 5, 1942, Beeson was posted to No. 71 Squadron at Debden, Essex.

=== World War II ===
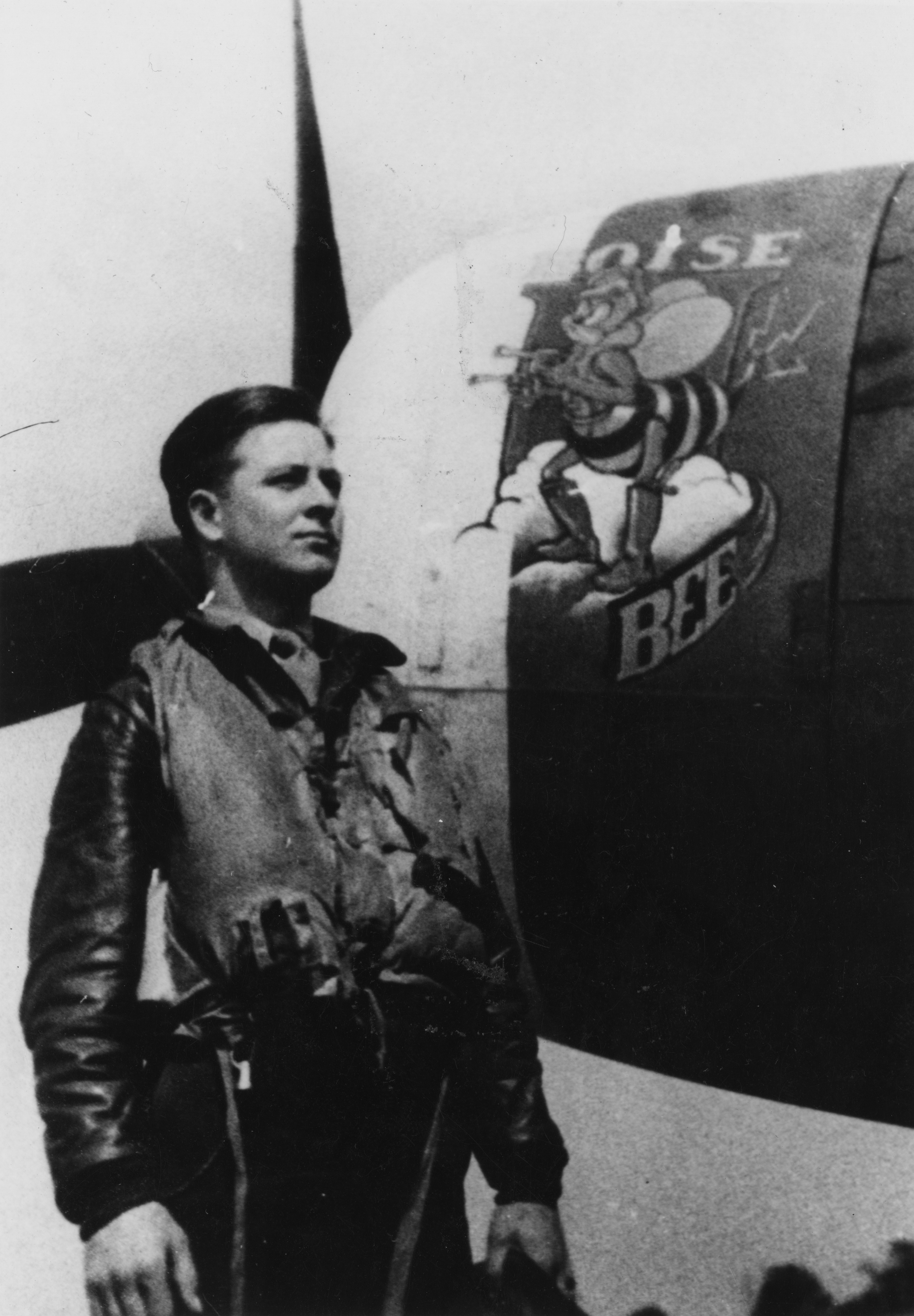
Beeson beside his P-47 Thunderbolt 'Boise Bee'

At the time the United States Army Air Forces were arriving in England for operations over Europe. The RAF Eagle Squadrons were being absorbed into the Eighth Air Force, and Beeson among those who resigned their RCAF commissions and transferred to the USAAF. The newly formed 4th Fighter Group continued to fly its RAF-issued Supermarine Spitfires until it received the P-47 Thunderbolts in early 1943.

Beeson flew his first combat mission with his new unit, the 334th Fighter Squadron. In November, Beeson flew a test flight to fire his guns and flew unauthorized over the French coast, attacking German road transport and damaging his aircraft.

In January 1943, Beeson was training on the Republic P-47 Thunderbolt. On May 8, 1943, Beeson engaged a group of German fighters and shot down a Bf 109. On June 26, during an escort mission over Dieppe he spotted two Messerschmitt 109s, one with a P-47 on his tail. Beeson shot down one Bf 109 into the sea, using just 400 rounds of ammunition. A month later Beeson was awarded the Distinguished Flying Cross in recognition of 37 combat missions and two victories.

On July 2, the 4th Fighter Group became the first fighter group to penetrate German airspace. Over the Netherlands, the group engaged a flight of Bf 109s, attacking a formation of B-17s. Beeson and his wingman dove from 21,000 feet into the enemy formation and Beeson shot down another Bf 109. In September, after 65 combat missions, he was awarded the Silver Star. On October 8, 1943, Beeson shot down two more Bf 109s over the Netherlands. The commanding officer, Lieutenant Colonel Donald Blakeslee, appointed Beeson the group's gunnery officer.

On January 29, 1944, Beeson shot down a Bf 109 and a Focke-Wulf Fw 190, earning him the Distinguished Service Cross. Beeson's official report on this action at 1100 hours in the vicinity of Aachen was as follows: "We sighted approximately fifteen Me 109s and FW 190s flying near the bombers and when Pectin squadron attacked them they went into a dive. As our squadron bounced this group of enemy aircraft, I saw about six other Me 109s coming in to get on the Squadron’s tail. Lt. Chatterley and I turned into these. One of them put a hole in my tail-plane before we could turn onto them, but when the turn was completed I saw Lt. Chatterley on the tail of a 109, shooting and getting very good strikes. These 109s also started to dive and I got on the tail of the nearest one, and opened fire at 250 yards, closing to about 50 yards. I was using A.P.I. ammunition and saw very severe strikes on the fuselage and wing roots, then a large flash somewhere in the cockpit area and the enemy aircraft flicked violently to the right and went down trailing a long stream of grey-black smoke. This combat took place from 23,000 feet down to about 15,000 feet, and the last I saw of the 109, he was going straight down through 10/10ths cloud below.

I was then alone and saw a combat going on far below so started down again when I sighted an aircraft off to starboard also diving. When I went over to investigate he turned out to be a yellow-tailed FW 190 with a belly tank. I don’t think he saw me as I was approaching him out of the sun, but he steepened his dive a little and I was closing on him slowly, so I fired a burst out of range trying to slow him down. No results were seen so I continued behind him as he went into cloud at about 3,000 feet and when we came out below was about 300 yards behind. I opened fire again and saw many incendiary strikes on his fuselage. He dropped his nose at about 200 feet altitude and went into the deck. I then pulled up in a zoom to 5000 feet where there were many P-47s of Greenbelt squadron and came home with them. Claim 1 Me 109 and 1 FW 190 Destroyed."

A day later Beeson claimed his tenth enemy aircraft. He would also file a claim on the 31st of another ME-109. By February 1944, the Eighth Air Force launched a series of large-scale raids to prompt the Luftwaffe into a battle of attrition and create air superiority over Europe. Operation Pointblank was aimed at the destruction of the Luftwaffe through air combat, the strafing of German airfields, and the bombing of aircraft factories.

The big raids were dubbed "Big Week." The 4th FG P-47s were equipped with two drop tanks that doubled their combat range. Blakeslee was able to get top priority for the new P-51 Mustangs, promising "I'll have them operational in 24 hours." When the group flew its first missions on February 25, the pilots had less than one hour and ten minutes' flight time in the new fighter. During the week, Beeson was awarded an oak leaf cluster to his Distinguished Flying Cross and promoted to captain. With 80 combat missions completed he was made commanding officer of B Flight at the age of 22.

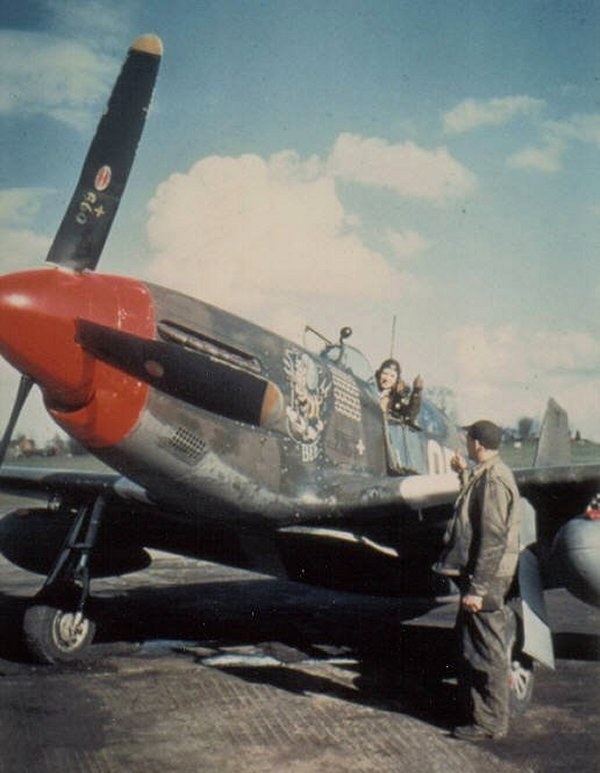
Beeson onboard his P-51B Mustang

On February 28, Beeson got his new P-51B. He and crew chief Willard Wahl named the aircraft simply "Bee." In his first mission across the English Channel he strafed a Junkers Ju 88 on the ground. On March 23, Beeson downed two more Bf 109s, making him the Army Air Forces' most successful ace. It was Beeson's 93rd combat mission and he had 17 claims.

He got two more kills, but on April 5 he was brought down by German fire from the ground. He was captured and interrogated by the famous Hanns Scharff. In a prisoner-of-war camp Beeson passed the time boxing, reading, and studying. The camp was liberated by Soviet forces on April 29, 1945. It took Beeson nearly a month to make it back to Debden. While a prisoner of war, Beeson had been promoted to major and had received the Distinguished Service Cross, the Silver Star, the Distinguished Flying Cross with five oak leaf clusters, and the Air Medal, most of which were presented to his parents at Gowen Field.

=== Post war ===
He returned to Boise in June 1945 and made every effort to get reassigned to the Pacific theatre, but the Pacific War soon ended. Beeson was reassigned to Sarasota, Florida, where he met his future wife, Tracy Waters. They married in Baltimore in January 1946. Soon afterward Beeson became violently ill. Doctors diagnosed a brain tumor and Beeson was flown to Walter Reed Hospital in Washington, D.C., for an operation. He died before the operation could be performed. He was just 25 years old. He is buried at Arlington National Cemetery.

In November 1993, the Duane W. Beeson Terminal Building was named in his honor.

== Aerial victory credits ==
Chronicle of aerial victories
Date	#	Type	Location	Aircraft flown	Unit Assigned
May 18, 1943	1	Messerschmitt Bf 109	Blankenberge, Belgium / Ostend, Belgium	Republic P-47C Thunderbolt	334 FS, 4 FG
June 26, 1943	1	Bf 109	Dieppe, France	Republic P-47D Thunderbolt	334 FS, 4 FG
July 28, 1943	1	Bf 109	Rotterdam, Netherlands	P-47D	334 FS, 4 FG
October 2, 1943	1	Focke Wulf Fw 190	Wilhelmshaven, Germany	P-47D	334 FS, 4 FG
October 10, 1943	2	Bf 109	between Meppel, Netherlands and Zwolle, Netherlands	P-47D	334 FS, 4 FG
January 14, 1944	1	Fw 190	Soissons, France	P-47D	334 FS, 4 FG
January 29, 1944	1; 1	Bf 109; Fw 190	Aachen, Gernany	P-47D	334 FS, 4 FG
January 31, 1944	1	Bf 109	Gilze en Rijen, Netherlands	P-47D	334 FS, 4 FG
February 20, 1944	1	Fe 190	Aachen, Germany	P-47D	334 FS, 4 FG
February 25, 1944	1	Fw 190	Beckingen, Germany	P-47D	334 FS, 4 FG
February 28, 1944	0.20	Junkers Ju 88	Soissons, France	North American P-51B Mustang	334 FS, 4 FG
March 5, 1944	1	Bf 109	Bordeaux, France	P-51B	334 FS, 4 FG
March 18, 1944	1	Bf 109	Mannheim, Germany	P-51B	334 FS, 4 FG
March 23, 1944	2	Bf 109	Münster, Germany	P-51B	334 FS, 4 FG
April 1, 1944	1	Bf 109	Lake Constance, Germany	P-51B	334 FS, 4 FG
April 5, 1944	0.15	Ju 88	Plaue, Germany	P-51B	334 FS, 4 FG

SOURCES: Air Force Historical Study 85: USAF Credits for the Destruction of Enemy Aircraft, World War II

== Military decorations ==
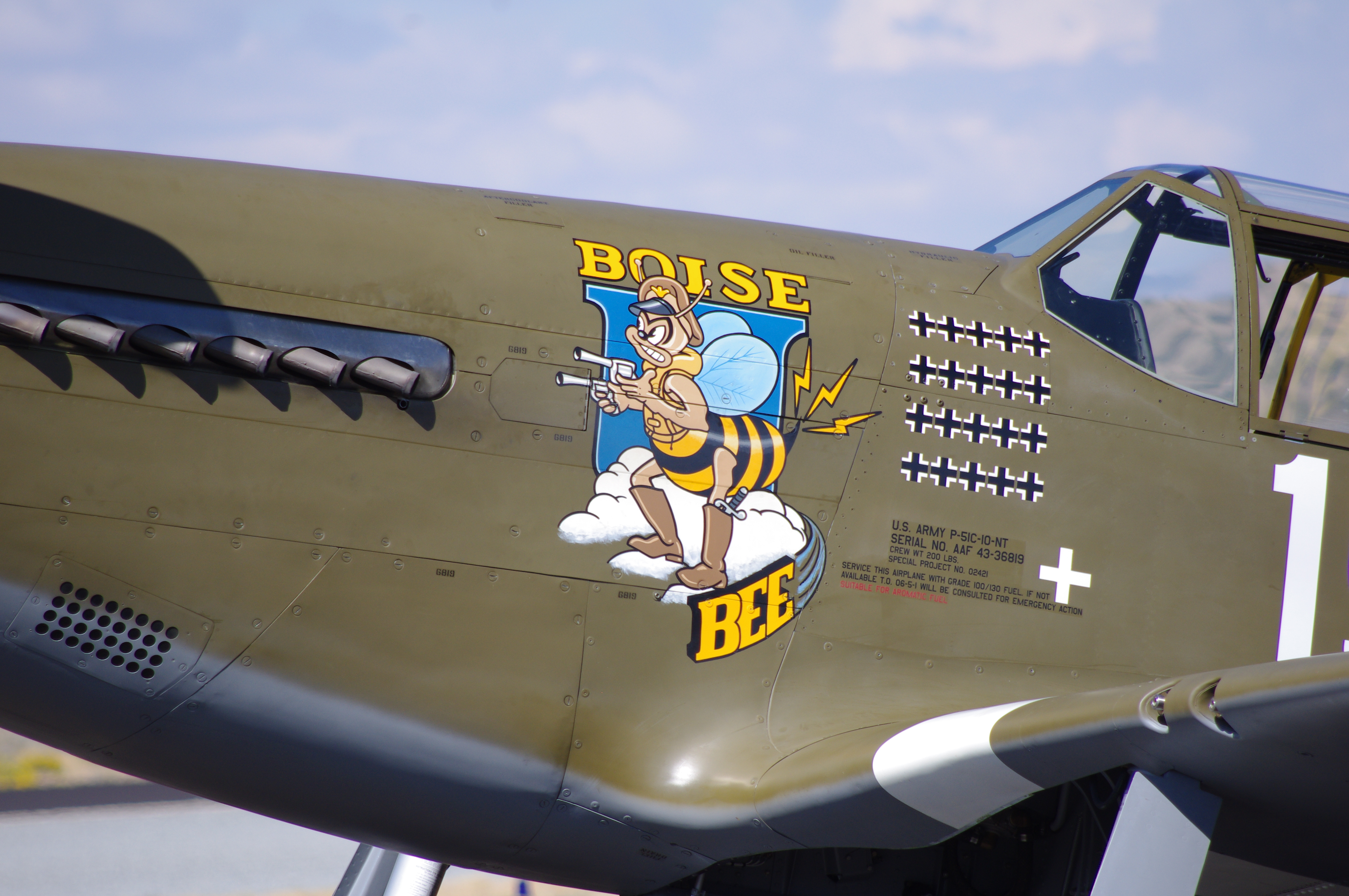
P-51C Mustang "Boise Bee" at the 2011 Reno Air Races

Beeson's awards include:

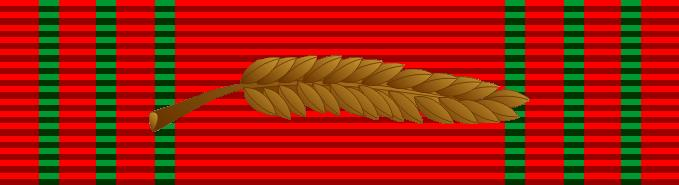
Army Air Forces Pilot Badge
Distinguished Service Cross
Silver Star
Distinguished Flying Cross with silver oak leaf cluster
Purple Heart
Air Medal with silver oak leaf cluster
Air Force Presidential Unit Citation
Prisoner of War Medal
American Campaign Medal
European-African-Middle Eastern Campaign Medal with bronze campaign star
World War II Victory Medal
Croix de Guerre with Palm (Belgium)

=== Distinguished Service Cross citation ===

Beeson, Duane W.
Captain (Air Corps), U.S. Army Air Forces
334th Fighter Squadron, 4th Fighter Group, Eighth Air Force
Date of Action: January 29, 1944

Citation:

For extraordinary heroism in action with the enemy, Captain Beeson, while leading a flight of P-47 aircraft escorting bombers attacking Frankfurt, Germany, led his flight and his squadron down to engage enemy fighters harassing a formation of heavy bombers. As his squadron dived to the attack, Captain Beeson observed six enemy aircraft coming down on his squadron from above. Aware of the immediate danger to his squadron, accompanied only by his wingman, he turned into the incoming aircraft. During the turn, an enemy fighter scored strikes on his tail-plane, impairing the operation efficiency of the aircraft. Despite this, and an unfavorable tactical position, he pressed home his attack against odds of three to one. The daring and vigor of his action scattered the opposing aircraft and permitted his squadron to proceed to the aid of the bombers. In combat ranging from 15,000 feet to 200 feet, Captain Beeson succeeded in destroying two of the enemy, and his heroism no doubt saved many fighters and bombers from damage and possible destruction. The unselfish bravery of Captain Beeson reflects great credit upon himself and the Armed Forces of the United States.
