= Manuel J. Fernandez =

American flying ace (1925–1980)

Manuel J. Fernandez Jr.
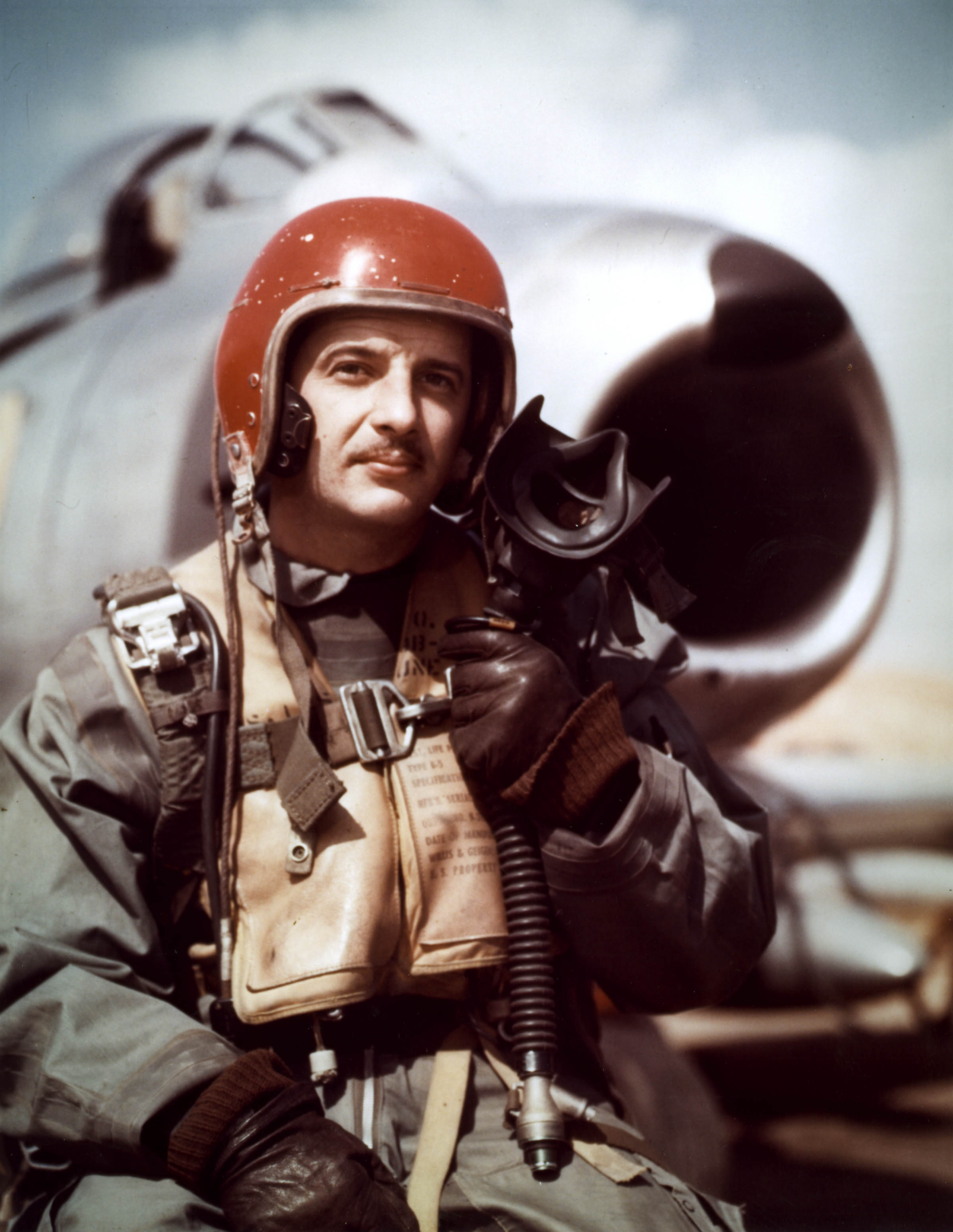
- Capt. Manuel J. Fernandez, Jr. of the 334th Fighter-Intercepter Squadron became the third highest ace in the Korean War with 14 1/2 kills.
- Born: April 19, 1925; Key West, Florida, U.S.
- Died: October 18, 1980 (aged 55); Grand Bahama Island, The Bahamas
- Burial place: Arlington National Cemetery
- Military career
- Allegiance: United States
- Branch: United States Army Air Forces; United States Air Force
- Service years: 1943–1963
- Rank: Major
- Nickname: Pete
- Unit: 334th Fighter-Interceptor Squadron
- Conflicts: World War II; Berlin Airlift; Korean War
- Awards: Distinguished Service Cross; Silver Star; Distinguished Flying Cross (2); Air Medal (2)
- Other work: 1956 Bendix Trophy Air Race winner

Manuel John "Pete" Fernandez, Jr. (19 April 1925 – 18 October 1980) was the third-leading American and United States Air Force ace in the Korean War. He was awarded the Distinguished Service Cross for extraordinary heroism in Korea on March 21, 1953.

== Early life ==
Pete Fernandez was born in Key West, Florida on 19 April 1925. His grandparents emigrated from Spain and spent some years on the island of Cuba before finally arriving in the United States. Fernandez was raised in a working-class environment in Miami. His father, an early amateur radio enthusiast, became chief radio operator for Pan American World Airways. Pete grew up immersed in aviation and learned to fly before he could drive, earning his private pilot's license at age fifteen. He graduated from Andrew Jackson High School in Miami, Florida in 1943.

== Military career ==
=== World War II ===
Fernandez enlisted in the Army Air Corps on February 23, 1943. On November 5, though small in stature and just a high school graduate, he entered the Aviation Cadet Program. On November 20, 1944, he was commissioned a second lieutenant and received his pilot wings through talent, determination and the enormous manpower needs of total war. In the first of many aerial teaching jobs, Fernandez served as a pilot instructor in Midland, Texas, then in San José, Guatemala and Panama, seeing no combat action during the war.

He re-enlisted in the U.S. Air Force and served during the Berlin Airlift in 1948–1949. A member of the 23rd Fighter Squadron, 36th Fighter Group since November 1946, his squadron stationed at Howard Field in Panama was sent to Fürstenfeldbruck AB (air base), Germany to provide fighter cover for the slow transport aircraft that were the aerial supply operation's backbone. The 36th Fighter Group was conveyed to Europe by the carrier USS Sicily to the port of Glasgow, Scotland. The USAF Lockheed F-80 jets the group flew were assembled at Renfrew Airport and then flown to Europe. He served afterwards as a pilot instructor at Nellis AFB in Nevada and Randolph AFB in Texas.

=== Korean War ===
It was only after nearly a decade in uniform that Captain Fernandez finally experienced battle. His turn came in the Korean War, where he served 124 missions with the 334th Fighter-Interceptor Squadron, 4th Fighter-Interceptor Group, from September 1952 to May 1953. He proved to be one of the best combat aviators of his generation. Prior to going to the Korean War, he was an advanced instructor at Nellis Air Force Base Gunnery School in Las Vegas, NV. Fernandez wanted to be part of the action in Korea and several times requested a transfer to the war. At the time the Air Force was reluctant to send its best instructors, preferring they lead the severe training regimen ongoing at Nellis. His requests were denied. Finally in frustration, Fernandez decided to begin a disobedience program. He began showing up at 5:00 AM – late, drunk, or sometimes AWOL. Ultimately the Air Force was forced into a choice, either court martial him, or send him to Korea. They sent him to Korea where he could use his extreme talents as a fighter pilot. Fernandez was a crack marksman, one of the best in the Air Force at that time in the art of deflection shooting. Fernandez used stealth and cunning to stalk MiGs rather than attacking impetuously. His modus operandi in combat was to maneuver skillfully and trigger his guns only when he had attained an optimum firing position. Like all top aces in Korea, Fernandez routinely violated Chinese air space by crossing the Yalu River into northeast China to hunt his elusive MiG quarry. He had a reputation for taking care of his comrades and not being reckless with his wingman's safety in pursuit of air victories. In Korea, he became the third highest ranking American ace with 14.5 kills. What is particularly interesting about this record is that he achieved it in a very short period of time, approximately nine months.

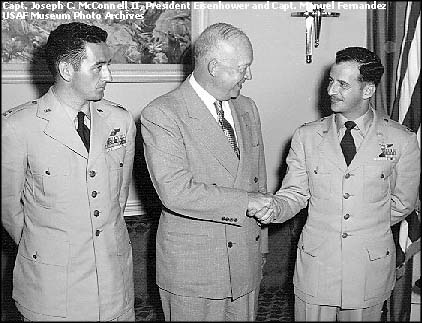
Top Korea aces Joe McConnell and "Pete" Fernandez meet with President Dwight Eisenhower at the White House in May 1953.

On 13 May 1953, Fernandez was ordered out of Korea. The Air Force was in the habit of sending its aces home early to protect them, and Fernandez was then its #1 ace. Fighter piloting in war frequently carries with it a sense of great competition among the best pilots. By 18 May, Fernandez with 14.5 kills, was ahead of both Air Force Major James Jabara with 14 kills, and Air Force Capt. Joseph McConnell (one of Fernadez's past trainees) with 13 kills. Fernandez had only been in Korea 9 months, while Jabara saw 28 months and McConnell 11 months of combat. On 18 May 1953, McConnell led a two jet mission in North Korea encountering 28 MiG-15s. It was during this last day of McConnell's tour in Korea that he destroyed three MiG's which moved him (16 air victories) ahead of both Fernandez and Jabara. On 15 July 1953, Jabara earned his last kill bringing his total to 15, and slightly ahead of Fernandez. When Fernandez returned to Nellis, he lamented that had the Air Force permitted him the two additional months, he would have maintained his #1 spot. Such was the state of their competition.

Fernandez returned home at the same time as McConnell. The two fighter pilots enjoyed a hero's welcome, and were feted in city after city with parades and ceremonial keys. The newly elected president, Dwight Eisenhower, invited them for a private debriefing in the White House. The fighter pilots' next duty station was California. McConnell got into flight testing, a coveted billet for its excitement and career-enhancing potential, and was sent to newly christened Edwards AFB.

=== Hollywood movies ===
A major Hollywood production was in the works about Captain McConnell called Tiger In The Sky. Fernandez, stationed near Los Angeles at the time, was an obvious choice to be the film's technical advisor. This billet included flying many stunts. Movie production was gearing up for shooting when suddenly, the top air ace was killed in a test accident in the Mojave Desert on August 25, 1954. The film project was retitled The McConnell Story with the tragic ending added and released in 1955. It starred actor Alan Ladd and actress June Allyson as Joe and "Butch" McConnell, with a cinematic result more love story than war saga. The film's tale is made more poignant knowing the movie stars fell into their own star-crossed romance—both were married to other people—even as they portrayed forlorn lovers. Allyson diligently chronicled the whole story in her 1982 autobiography.

Fernandez befriended Allyson on the set and after production ended, she and her husband, actor/director Dick Powell invited the ace and his family to their California ranch. There, Pete shared his battle experiences with filmmaker Powell, whose next project was a Korean War air combat picture titled The Hunters, starring legendary actor Robert Mitchum and Robert Wagner. Powell's final film was released to good reviews in 1958, and it contains much more realistic combat sequences than The McConnell Story. Fernandez and two other top Korea aces, Jabara and Royal N. Baker, attended the movie premiere.

=== Post war career and Test pilot ===
Fernandez served with Ninth Air Force at Pope Air Force Base, North Carolina, from August to September 1953, and then served with a series of fighter squadrons at George Air Force Base, California, from November 1953 to October 1956.

In 1956, Fernandez had won aviation's prestigious Bendix Trophy Race by maximizing his speed and fuel consumption with old tricks learned while at war over Korea and China. There was a level playing field in the 1956 Bendix run, as all six aviators in the competition were experienced Air Force fighter pilots riding the same mount, the USAF's newest fighter, the F-100 Super Sabre. The chosen route was Los Angeles to Oklahoma City, 1,118 miles from start to finish. Though aerial refueling was approved for the first time in race history, no USAF tanker planes were available, so the competing aviators did without. This situation made their pre-race calculations all the more critical, as there would be little margin for error. Pete stayed up late the evening before the event, meticulously plotting his flight profile to wring everything he could manage from each ounce of fuel. On 31 August the six aircraft lifted off from Victorville, California at dawn, one after another, with Fernandez leading the way. When Pete's F-100 rolled past the finish line in Oklahoma City less than two hours later, there was just twenty gallons of fuel remaining in its tanks, enough to stay airborne about a minute. As in Korea, careful planning was critical to Fernandez's Bendix triumph.

Fernandez served at Edwards Air Force Base, California, from October 1956 to April 1957. He next sought assignment to flight testing in an effort to make rank. As a reserve officer, Fernandez would be forced to leave the service after twenty years unless he was tracked for higher command and given a regular commission. Hence, there was significant career pressure to get promoted. Pete was chosen in 1957, to try out for Test Pilot School at Nellis Air Force Base, though with just a high school degree, he was underqualified and clearly getting a break due to his war record. Further complicating matters, Fernandez was hindered by a USAF campaign then underway to "professionalize" the Air Force by weeding out officers who had no higher education. (Pete's advancement from Miami teenager to military aviator had only been possible due to the Air Corps' unique and massive 1942–1947 expansion from an auxiliary Army branch into a modern air service.) At Test Pilot School, the Floridian had arrived at a critical juncture that would change the rest of his life. Finding himself scholastically unprepared for the academic challenge (the TPS curriculum had just begun to emphasize aerospace engineering), Fernandez decided to cheat on one of the entrance requirements, a calculus research project, and got caught. This act sank his future with the Air Force permanently. Pete served as an Air Force Recruiter at Coral Gables, Florida, and then Robins Air Force Base, Georgia, from April 1957 to January 1960.

After completing Spanish Language School, he was then sent in August 1960 to Buenos Aires, Argentina as an advisor to the Argentine Air Force. He retired with the rank of major upon reaching twenty years' service on July 1, 1963.

== Death ==
Fernandez died in a plane crash on October 18, 1980, while flying to Miami from the Bahamas. He received obituaries in the Miami Herald and The New York Times, both of which mentioned widespread rumors that held he had been flying classified missions in central and south America for the CIA after his retirement from the U.S. Air Force.

He is buried at Arlington National Cemetery.

== Awards and decorations ==
His decorations include:

USAF Command Pilot badge
Distinguished Service Cross		Silver Star
Distinguished Flying Cross w/ 1 bronze oak leaf cluster	Air Medal w/ 1 bronze oak leaf cluster	Air Force Commendation Medal
Air Force Presidential Unit Citation	Army Good Conduct Medal	American Campaign Medal
World War II Victory Medal	Army of Occupation Medal w/ Berlin Airlift Device	National Defense Service Medal w/ 1 bronze service star
Korean Service Medal w/ 3 bronze campaign stars	Air Force Longevity Service Award w/ 4 bronze oak leaf clusters	Armed Forces Reserve Medal
Republic of Korea Presidential Unit Citation	United Nations Korea Medal	Korean War Service Medal

=== Distinguished Service Cross citation ===
Citation:

The President of the United States takes pleasure in presenting the Distinguished Service Cross to Manuel J. Fernandez, Jr., Captain, U.S. Air Force, for extraordinary heroism in connection with military operations against an armed enemy of the United Nations while serving as a Pilot with the 334th Fighter-Interceptor Squadron, 4th Fighter-Interceptor Wing, FIFTH Air Force, in action against enemy forces in the Republic of Korea on 21 March 1953. During a fighter swoop over North Korea, Captain Fernandez sighted a flight of thirty MIGs, and attempted to release his external fuel tanks in preparation for battle. However, one of the tanks failed to release, impairing the maneuverability of his aircraft. However, despite this handicap, he fearlessly initiated a fierce attack on the last two MIGs in the enemy formation. Closing to twelve hundred feet, he opened fire on one MIG, scoring hits on the fuselage and wing. As he was closing again, the other MIG attached him; however, by a skillfully executed maneuver, he gained tactical advantage over the attacker, and his bursts scored hits which caused the enemy pilot to eject himself from the uncontrollable aircraft. Captain Fernandez then turned again to his initial adversary and, closing dangerously to one hundred and fifty feet, fired several bursts which caused the MIG to burst into flame and go spinning to earth. Captain Fernandez's outstanding flying skill and extraordinary courage in attacking this greatly superior number of enemy aircraft despite the hindrance to maneuverability enabled him to completely destroy two enemy aircraft.

== See also ==
- List of Korean War air aces
- Hispanics in the United States Air Force
