= Hubert Zemke =

American World War II fighter pilot

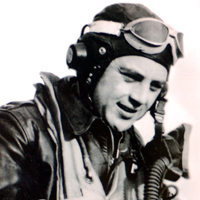
- Colonel Hubert "Hub" Zemke
- Born: March 14, 1914; Missoula, Montana
- Died: August 30, 1994 (aged 80); Oroville, California
- Military career
- Allegiance: United States
- Branch: United States Army Air Forces; United States Air Force
- Service years: 1936–1966
- Rank: Colonel
- Nickname: "Hub"
- Units: 56th Fighter Group; 479th Fighter Group
- Commands: 56th Fighter Group; 479th Fighter Group; 36th Fighter Group; 31st Strategic Fighter Wing; 40th Air Division; 4080th Strategic Reconnaissance Wing
- Conflicts: World War II
- Awards: Distinguished Service Cross; Silver Star (2); Distinguished Flying Cross (8); Purple Heart; Air Medal (4)

Colonel Hubert Zemke (March 14, 1914 – August 30, 1994) was a career officer in the United States Air Force, a fighter pilot in World War II, and a leading United States Army Air Forces ace. He commanded the 56th Fighter Group in England, which came to be known as "Zemke's Wolf Pack."

== Biography ==
Born March 14, 1914, to German immigrant parents, Anna (1889–1972) and Benno Zemke (1882–1967), in Missoula, Montana, Zemke had no desire to fly; he intended to pursue a degree in forestry at the University of Montana in Missoula on football and boxing scholarships. While at the University of Montana, he was a member of Sigma Nu fraternity. He left school in February 1936 to enter Army Flight Training.(Ref)

In 1936 Zemke's friends convinced him to try out for pilot training in the United States Army Air Corps. He was accepted as an aviation cadet, gained his pilot's wings and commissions at Randolph Field, then attended the pursuit pilot course at Kelly Field, Texas, in 1937, becoming a Curtiss P-40 pilot with the 36th Pursuit Squadron at Langley Field, Virginia.

In 1940, Zemke was sent to England as a combat observer with the Royal Air Force (RAF), studying the tactics of both the RAF and the Luftwaffe, observations that he would use later when the United States entered the war. In 1941, he was sent to the Soviet Union to instruct Russian pilots in flying lend-lease P-40 Tomahawks.

== World War II ==
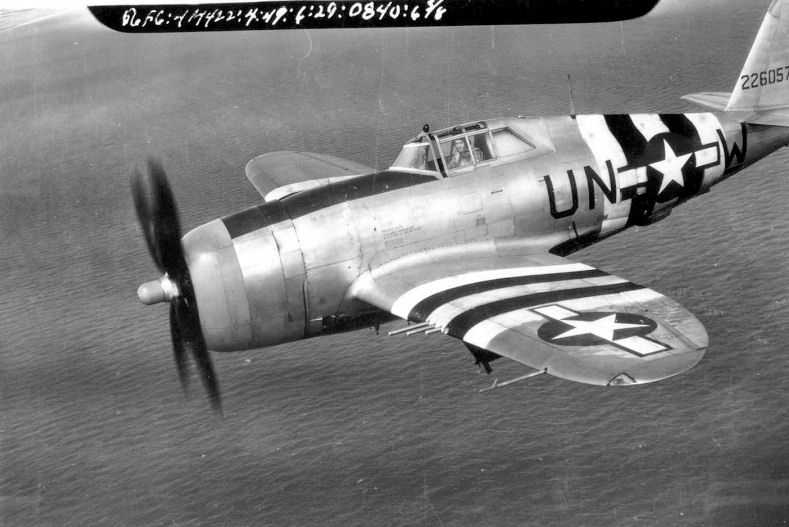
Republic P-47D-22-RE Thunderbolt of the 63d Fighter Squadron, 56th Fighter Group. Pilot 2nd Lt. Elwood D. Raymond, KIA on September 18th, 1944, by flak and crashed in North Sea during operation Market Garden.

=== 56th Fighter Group ===
In February 1942, after the United States' entry into World War II, Zemke desired to join a United States Army Air Forces (USAAF) unit and made his way back to the United States through Iran and Egypt. After several temporary assignments, including tests of the new P-47 Thunderbolt, Zemke, by then a major, became group commander of the 56th Fighter Group—the first fighter group to fly the P-47—on September 16, 1942, preparing it for movement to England. Not impressed with the performance or maneuverability of the aircraft, Zemke spent much time developing tactics utilizing the Thunderbolt's tremendous dive capability that would make it a successful platform in the European Theater. In January 1943, the 56th was sent to England in order to participate in the bombing offensive against Germany with the Eighth Air Force.

Once established in England, the 56th began escorting bombers over Europe. Zemke made progress by stressing flight discipline and teamwork, often implementing ideas of even the lowest ranking man. Despite obvious problems with the P-47 as an aerial opponent to Luftwaffe fighters—primarily its poor rate of climb, very slow rate of acceleration, and radio problems—Zemke stressed the strengths of the Thunderbolt (its excellent dive performance and superior rate of roll) and conceived tactics to match them. Rather than encouraging discontent with the P-47, as was the case in the other groups but particularly in the 4th, he turned the aircraft into a positive weapon. Zemke's subordinates saw him as being stern but fair, and the 56th Fighter Group's proficiency with the P-47 and "dive, fire, and recover" tactics turned it into the leading air superiority group of VIII Fighter Command by August 1943. On May 8, 1943, Zemke was promoted to colonel. On June 13, 1943, while leading the 56th FG Zemke encountered and claimed two German Fw 190s flown by pilots of Jagdgeschwader 54.

On October 4, 1943, Zemke scored his fifth kill, making him an ace. During that entire month, "Zemke's Wolfpack," (as the 56th had begun to call itself), claimed 39 German aircraft shot down for the loss of only one of their own, including 34 in a 10-day period of intensive bomber escort operations between October 4 and October 14.

His success had what might have been a negative impact on his unit; he was relieved of command to go to Washington, D.C., as part of a team led by Brigadier General Curtis E. LeMay to brief Pentagon superiors and Congress. Zemke obtained assurances that he would be reinstated to command of the 56th when that duty ended (which happened in January 1944). Zemke hand-picked his replacement, Colonel Robert B. Landry, an older staff officer, to prevent command of the group from permanently going to the deputy commander, Lieutenant Colonel David C. Schilling. According to Eighth Air Force historian Roger A. Freeman, Zemke harbored misgivings about Schilling's youth and impulsiveness at this early stage of the war. However, Landry left the actual operational direction of the group to Schilling.

After his return to the 56th, Zemke was important in helping turn the tide of the air war in Europe by espousing tactics that allowed U.S. fighters to break from close escort and attack enemy planes before they could get to the bombers, known as the "Zemke Fan," in which fighters rendezvoused at a prominent landmark in their escort zone while flying ahead of the bomber formations, then with the elements of fighters scattering and fanning out by flights in a 180° arc. The Eighth Air Force as a whole adopted a modified "Zemke Fan" in early 1945 for all its groups. He also pushed other tactical innovations in aircraft markings and weapons employment that developed the P-47 into a superior aerial weapon.

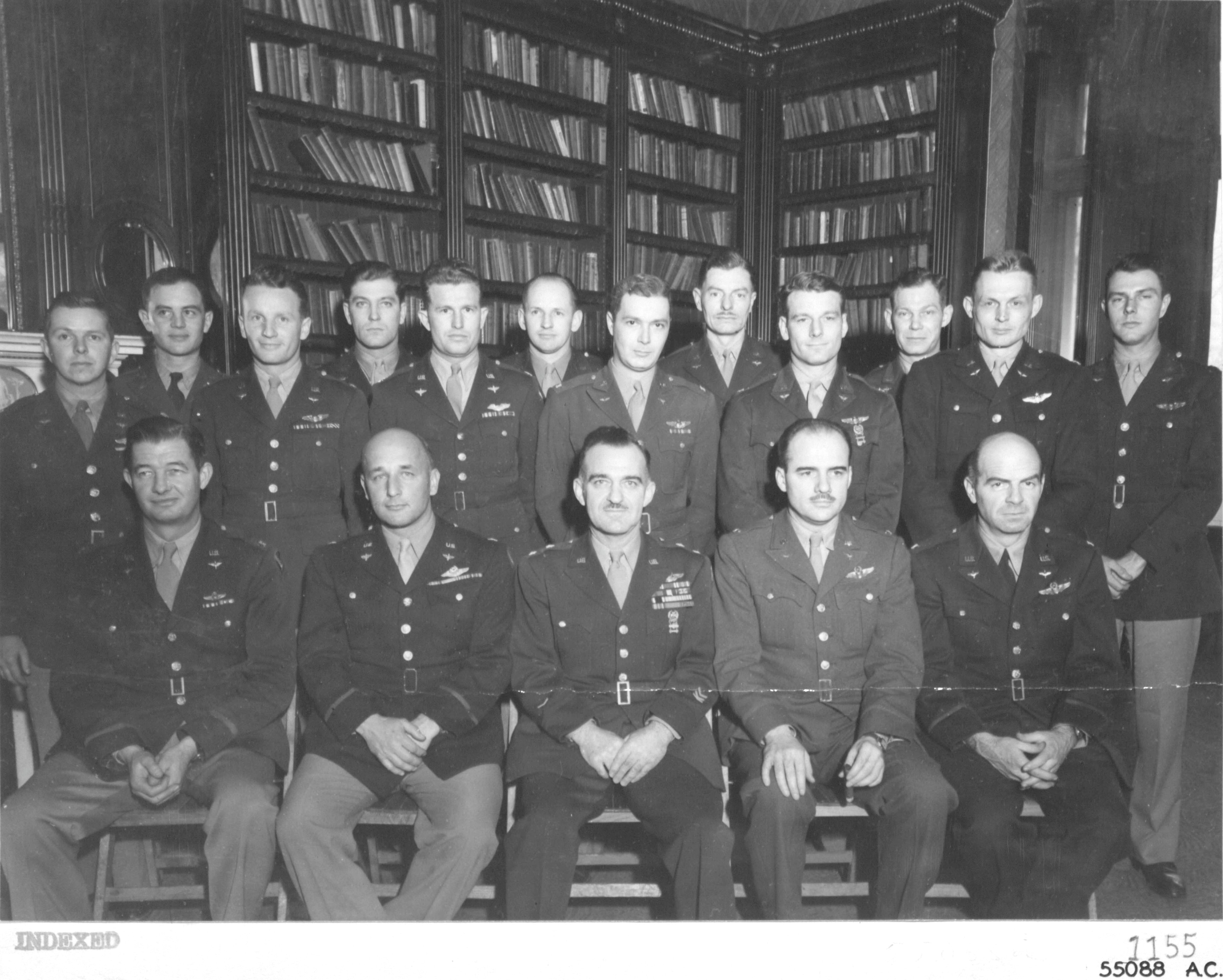
Zemke (standing second from left) and other commanding officers of the fighter groups of the 8th Air Force in 1944

While under Zemke's command, the 56th FG claimed over 500 of the eventual 665.5 German aircraft the group was credited with destroying in World War II, and he himself claimed shot down 15.25 of those. He was twice awarded the Distinguished Service Cross while commanding the 56th in 1944, for the missions of February 11 (bomber escort to Frankfurt) and March 6 (Berlin escort).

On 12 May 1944 Zemke was trying out the "Zemke Fan" tactic while on a bomber escort mission, when the P-47s found themselves isolated and bounced by Günther Rall's JG 11 fighter wing on a Reichsverteidigung defensive patrol. The ensuing dogfight saw both Zemke's wingmen shot down by Rall himself. Two P-47s and two North American P-51 Mustangs were lost for four Messerschmitt Bf 109s shot down in that particular action. In total the 56th claimed 18 Bf 109s for the loss of three P-47s on this day. JG 11's records show that 11 Bf 109s were lost that day. The German pilots suffered five wounded and two killed. Rall was wounded, his left thumb was shot off, and he was forced to bail out.

=== 479th Fighter Group ===
On August 12, 1944, Zemke transferred to the 479th Fighter Group, the least experienced in the Eighth Air Force. The commanding general of VIII Fighter Command requested Zemke provide his deputy commander, Lieutenant Colonel David C. Schilling, for command of the 479th after its commander, Lieutenant Colonel Kyle L. Riddle, had been shot down August 10 on a strafing mission. The 479th, a P-38 Lightning group that had begun operations in conjunction with the D-Day invasion, was earmarked to convert to the P-51 Mustang with all other Eighth Air Force fighter groups (except Zemke's own 56th FG), and had suffered 30 losses in its first 75 days of combat. In yet another irony involving Schilling, Zemke nominated himself for transfer in order to fly the Mustang in combat. This accommodated Schilling, who adamantly opposed the transfer and who was flying a second combat tour in order to remain with the 56th, and he became its group commander.

Shortly after its transition to P-51's, Zemke made one of the first probable shoot–downs of a German jet fighter. Zemke achieved 2.5 kills while leading the 479th and was slated to become chief of staff of the 66th Fighter Wing. Unfortunately on a mission on October 30, 1944, while flying in unforecasted turbulence, the wing of Zemke's P-51 was torn off. Zemke was forced to bail out over enemy territory and was captured. (In another twist, he was replaced in command by Colonel Riddle, who had evaded capture and returned in mid-September to be Zemke's deputy commander.) Zemke's combat service ended after 154 missions and 17.75 confirmed aerial victories.

=== Prisoner of war ===
Captured after several days of evasion, Zemke became a prisoner of war (POW) and was transported to several interrogation centers and interrogated by Hanns Scharff. While being transported by train between interrogations, Allied fighters began strafing the passenger cars. After realizing that escaping in the confusion was impossible due to the surroundings, Zemke returned to the car to pull two young German girls from the line of fire as the fighters made another pass. For this action he was nearly awarded a Nazi medal for bravery. He became Senior Allied Officer of Stalag Luft I at Barth, on December 16, 1944, in command of the 7,000 Allied prisoners of "Provisional Wing X." Conditions were deplorable: insufficient food, inadequate clothing and medical attention, a lack of military discipline among some POWs, and indifferent or hostile German officials.

Zemke established his leadership of the POWs who numbered 9,000 by the end of the war. Gradually he developed working relations with the German camp commandant and staff and achieved some improvements in living conditions. Toward the end of the war, Zemke suspected the Germans might try to kill the POWs rather than allow them to be liberated by the advancing Soviet armies. In preparation, Zemke prepared a force of commandos and stockpiled weapons (mostly homemade grenades) in order to resist any such attempt.

As it became apparent that war was lost, the Germans became more cooperative especially as Soviet armies approached from the east. When the prisoners of Stalag Luft I were ordered to leave the camp by the camp commandant, Zemke refused the order. Zemke and his staff negotiated an arrangement for the Germans to depart quietly at night, bearing only small arms, and turn the camp over to the Allied POW wing.

To avoid conflict between POWs and guards who had been particularly brutal, Zemke's staff kept the arrangement secret until the morning after the German departure. Zemke then cultivated friendly relations with the arriving Soviets, using his fluent German and some Russian language picked up during his time with the Soviet Air Force. Ultimately, in Operation Revival, Zemke arranged for the POWs to be flown to American-held territory by USAAF B-17 Flying Fortress bombers shortly after VE Day.

== Post-war Air Force career ==
Following the war, he was Tactics Division Chief at the Air Tactical School, Tyndall AFB, Florida. During the Berlin Airlift, Zemke commanded the 36th Fighter Group at Fürstenfeldbruck Air Base, West Germany, providing air defense alert. Remaining in Germany, he served as Chief of Staff of the 2d Air Division in Landsberg. He attended Air War College in 1953 and upon graduation was assigned as Chief of Plans within the Directorate of Operations at the Pentagon.

Next, he commanded the 31st Strategic Fighter Wing from August to October 1955, and the 40th Air Division, both at Turner AFB, Georgia. In March 1957 he received command of the 4080th Strategic Reconnaissance Wing at Turner and oversaw its relocation to Laughlin AFB, Texas, where it operated the top secret Lockheed U-2. From there he spent a two-year tour on staff at NORAD in Colorado Springs.

After three years as Air Section Chief, U.S. Military Assistance Advisory Group, Madrid, Spain, in October 1962 Zemke commanded the Reno Air Defense Sector at Stead AFB, Nevada. Colonel Zemke retired in 1966 after 30 years of military service.

Following retirement, he pursued a second career in agriculture. Colonel Hubert Zemke died August 30, 1994, in Oroville, California. In 2002 he was posthumously enshrined in the National Aviation Hall of Fame. In 2006 the United States Air Force Academy Class of 2009 elected him as their class exemplar.

== Awards and decorations ==
Zemke's decorations include:

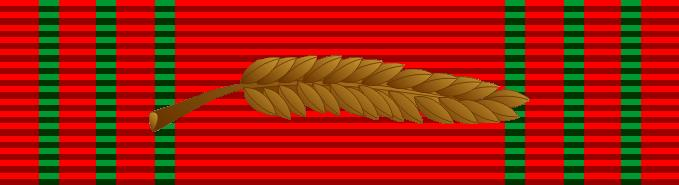
Command pilot
Distinguished Service Cross
Silver Star with bronze oak leaf cluster
Distinguished Flying Cross with one silver and two bronze oak leaf clusters
Purple Heart
Air Medal with three bronze oak leaf clusters
Army Commendation Medal
Air Force Presidential Unit Citation
Prisoner of War Medal
American Defence Service Medal
American Campaign Medal
European-African-Middle Eastern Campaign Medal with four bronze campaign stars
World War II Victory Medal
Army of Occupation Medal
National Defense Service Medal with one bronze service star
Air Force Longevity Service Award with silver oak leaf cluster
Small Arms Expert Marksmanship Ribbon
Distinguished Flying Cross (United Kingdom)
Croix de Guerre with Palm (France)
Croix de Guerre, with Palm (Belgium)

=== Distinguished Service Cross citation ===

Zemke, Hubert
Colonel, U.S Army Air Corps
56th Fighter Group, 8th Air Force
Date of Action: February 11, 1944
Headquarters, U.S. Strategic Forces in Europe, General Orders No. 18 (March 20, 1944)
Citation:

The President of the United States of America, authorized by Act of Congress, July 9, 1918, takes pleasure in presenting the Distinguished Service Cross to Colonel (Air Corps) Hubert Zemke, United States Army Air Forces, for extraordinary heroism in connection with military operations against an armed enemy while serving as Pilot of a P-47 Fighter Airplane in the 56th Fighter Group, Eighth Air Force, in aerial combat against enemy forces on 11 February 1944, in the European Theater of Operations. On that date, Colonel Zemke attacked a German airdrome, flying into the face of persistent, heavy and accurate defensive fire. He destroyed one enemy aircraft, damaged two others, damaged two airplane hangars and other buildings in the airdrome. Displaying this same cool, calculated courage on 6 March 1944, he attacked a large formation of airborne German fighter aircraft, delivering his attack so skillfully, and with such tenacity of purpose, without thought of personal safety, as to destroy two and probably destroy one other of the enemy's airplanes. Colonel Zemke's courage, coolness and determination greatly contributed to the successes of aerial operations against the enemy and reflect great credit upon himself and the Armed Forces of the United States.

Zemke was named as the class exemplar at the United States Air Force Academy of the Class of 2009.
