= War Merit Cross (Reuss) =

War Merit Cross Kriegsverdienstkreuz
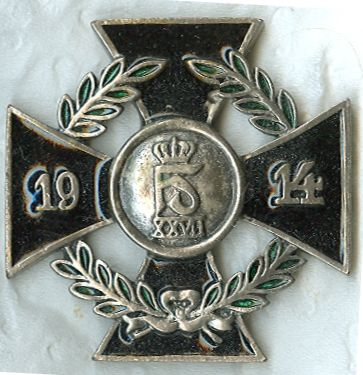
- Reuss War Merit Cross
- Type: Military decoration
- Presented by: Principality of Reuss
- Campaign: World War I
- Status: No longer awarded
- Established: 23 May 1915
- Final award: 1918

The War Merit Cross (German: Kriegsverdienstkreuz) was a military decoration of the Principality of Reuss. Established 23 May 1915 by Fürst Heinrich XXVII the Cross was presented to all ranks for distinguished conduct in combat.
