= May 1915 =

Month of 1915

| << | May 1915 | | | | | >> |
| Su | Mo | Tu | We | Th | Fr | Sa |
| | | | | | | 1 |
| 2 | 3 | 4 | 5 | 6 | 7 | 8 |
| 9 | 10 | 11 | 12 | 13 | 14 | 15 |
| 16 | 17 | 18 | 19 | 20 | 21 | 22 |
| 23 | 24 | 25 | 26 | 27 | 28 | 29 |
| 30 | 31 |

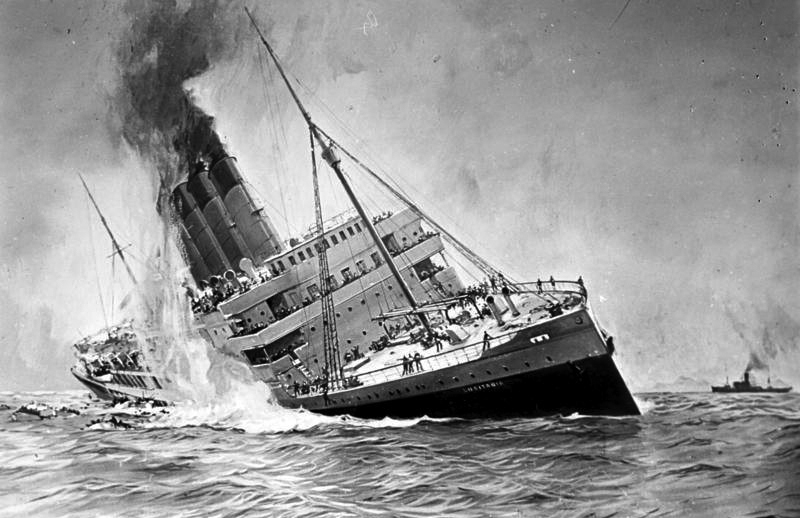
Painting depicting the sinking of the RMS Lusitania by German U-boat SM U-20.

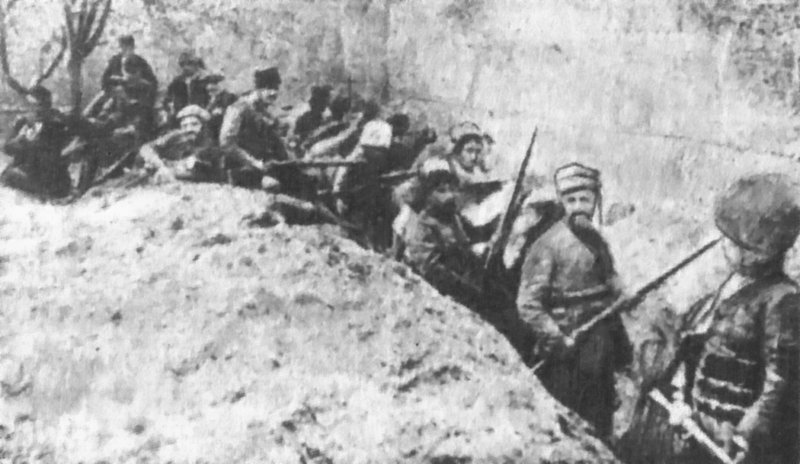
Armenian civilians holding a defense line against Ottoman forces in the Armenian walled city of Van in May 1915.

The following events occurred in May 1915:

== May 1, 1915 (Saturday) ==
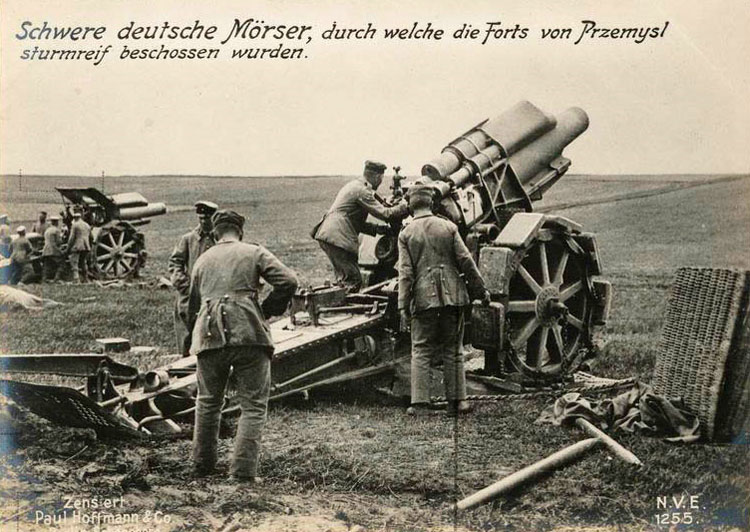
A German artillery piece used for bombardment during the Gorlice–Tarnów Offensive on the Eastern Front.

- Gorlice–Tarnów Offensive – Combined German and Austro-Hungarian forces under command of General August von Mackensen bombarded and attacked trenches held by the Russian Third Army along the Dunajec river in Galicia (now Poland), expending 70,000 shells over four hours before troops assaulted the trenches.
- Battle of Hill 60 – German forces launched a series of gas attacks to retake the strategic hill on the Western Front from the British.
- Battle of Eski Hissarlik – Ottoman forces counter-attacked during the night in an attempt to push Allied forces off their beachhead at Cape Helles during the Gallipoli campaign. However, Allied defenses were strong and well-prepared for night attacks and the Ottoman forces were repelled.
- Zaian War – French colonial forces crossed the Rbia River north of Khenifra, Morocco to cut off food supplies reserved for the rebelling Zayanes. During the campaign, a French convoy was attacked by 5,000 tribesmen, but were repulsed with 300 killed and 400 wounded over a two-day battle. The battle lead to six months of relative calm in the region.
- French submarine Joule struck a mine and sank in the Dardanelles with the loss of all 31 of her crew.
- British destroyer HMS Recruit was torpedoed and sunk in the North Sea by German submarine SM UB-6 with the loss of 34 of her crew.
- Royal Navy destroyers protecting naval trawlers fought off German torpedo boats at Noordhinder Bank in the south part of the North Sea, resulting in both torpedo boats being sunk with 13 German sailors killed and another 46 captured. Sixteen British sailors were lost in the attack.
- British ocean liner RMS Lusitania departed Pier 54 in New York City on a return voyage back to Liverpool with 1,959 passengers and crew on board.
- The British War Office issued instructions specifying the aircraft and armament Royal Flying Corps squadrons were to have ready for the defense of Great Britain against German airships, including having aircraft ready for immediate takeoff at all times, with a specific mix of weapons including bombs, grenades, and incendiary darts.
- American tanker Gulflight was torpedoed and damaged in the Atlantic Ocean 20 nautical miles (37 km) west of the Isles of Scilly by German submarine SM U-30 with the loss of three crew, becoming the first American ship to be attacked in World War I.
- Ambrose Heal and others founded the Design and Industries Association in London.
- The first part of the Mandra–Bhaun Railway opened in British India (now Pakistan), connecting Mandra with Bhaun.
- Rail stations Bradley and Moxley and Milton Road were closed as part of wartime measures in England.
- The Barry Railway Company opened a rail station in Llandow, Wales to serve the South Wales line. It closed in 1964.
- Japanese chemical manufacturer Denka was established in Tokyo.
- Candy store chain Haigh's Chocolates was established when Alfred E. Haigh opened a chocolate store in Adelaide, Australia. The shop became a chain starting in the 1950s.
- The sports club Strong was established in Oslo for hockey, and became one of the founding members of GET-ligaen, the premier Norwegian hockey league. It merged with two other clubs in 1952 to become Grüner.
- The association football club Silvolde was established through a merger of two separate clubs in Silvolde, Netherlands.
- Frances Cornford's Spring Morning, the first modern book illustrated with wood engravings by the poet's cousin Gwen Raverat, was published by The Poetry Bookshop in London.
- Born:
  - Michael Dillon, British physician, first trans man to undergo phalloplasty; in London, England (d. 1962)
  - Hoàng Văn Thái, Vietnamese army officer, first General Staff of the Vietnam People's Army; as Hoàng Văn Xiêm, in An Khang,Tiền Hải District, French Indochina (present-day Tay An, Vietnam) (d. 1986)
  - Archie Williams, American runner, gold medalist at the 1936 Summer Olympics; in Oakland, California, United States (d. 1993)

== May 2, 1915 (Sunday) ==
- Gorlice–Tarnów Offensive – Grand Duke Nicholas Nicholaevitch, supreme commander of the Russian Empire's armed forces, ordered fresh divisions to the Russian line as the Central Powers crossed the Wisłoka River using a captured bridge.
- The New Zealand and Australian Division launched an attack on a strategic hill in Gallipoli held by the 19th Infantry Division of the Ottoman Army, with support by the 1st Royal Naval Brigade.
- Norwegian cargo ship America was sunk in the North Sea off Bergen, Norway by German submarine SM U-41. Her 39 crew were rescued by another Norwegian ship.
- The Copa Del Rey Final was played in front of 5,000 spectators at Estadio de Amute in Hondarribia, Spain. Athletic Bilbao beat Espanyol 5–0 to win their 6th Copa del Rey (Spanish Cup).
- Died:
  - Clara Immerwahr, 44, German chemist and women's rights activist, first woman to be awarded a doctorate in chemistry, wife to Fritz Haber; died by suicide (b. 1870)
  - David Dalhoff Neal, 76, American artist, best known for his portraits of historic figures including Oliver Cromwell of Ely Visits Mr. John Milton (b. 1838)

== May 3, 1915 (Monday) ==
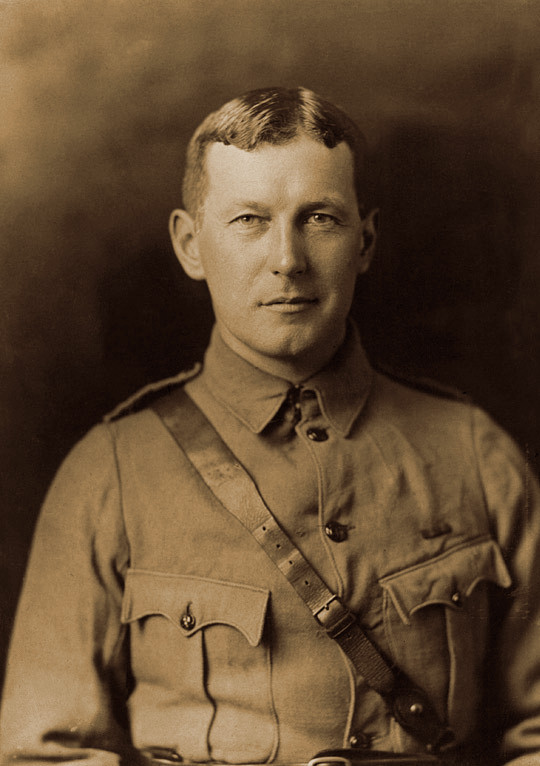
Canadian army officer John McCrae, author of "In Flanders Fields".

- Italy officially revoked the Triple Alliance. In the following days, Italian statesman Giovanni Giolitti led the neutralist majority of the Italian Parliament in opposing a war declaration, while nationalist crowds demonstrated in public areas for entering the war.
- Gorlice–Tarnów Offensive – Russian forces retreated from Gorlice as German and Austro-Hungarian troops crossed the Dunajec River north of Kraków.
- Combined Australian, New Zealand and British forces were not sufficient reinforcements to hold onto a strategic hill in Gallipoli, resulting in their withdraw at a cost of close to 1,000 casualties.
- The RAF Northolt station began operating in South Ruislip, London, England. It remains the longest, continuously used air station by the Royal Air Force.
- The first Zeppelin P Class airship of the Imperial German Army - the L38 - took flight for raids on England.
- While on patrol over the North Sea, a German Navy Zeppelin encountered and attacked four British submarines on the surface, however, all subs were able to escape by diving.
- The 101st and 103rd Infantry Divisions of the Imperial German Army were established.
- Swedish coastal defence ship Sverige was launched by Götaverken in Gothenburg, Sweden.
- Canadian medical soldier John McCrae wrote the poem "In Flanders Fields", after presiding over the funeral of a friend and fellow soldier who died in the Second Battle of Ypres.
- Home team Bethlehem Steel beat Brooklyn Celtic 3–1 at the second annual U.S. Open Cup at Taylor Field, Lehigh University in Bethlehem, Pennsylvania before a crowd of 7,000 spectators.
- The borough Bradford Woods, Pennsylvania was incorporated.
- U.S. steamer Undine arrived in Lewiston, Idaho from Portland, Oregon as part of the inaugural cruise for the newly built Celilo Canal that connected two points of the Columbia River. The canal was in operation until 1957 when The Dalles Dam was completed.
- Born: Stu Hart, Canadian wrestler, founder of Stampede Wrestling, patriarch of the Hart wrestling family; as Stewart Hart, in Saskatoon, Saskatchewan, Canada (d. 2003)

== May 4, 1915 (Tuesday) ==
- Los Angeles held a mayoral election, with Charles E. Sebastian elected to become the city's 30th mayor. Sebastian received over 28,000 votes, or 39 per cent of the polls.

== May 5, 1915 (Wednesday) ==
- Gorlice–Tarnów Offensive – The Russian Third Army began to collapse, allowing German forces to break through and capture 140,000 enemy soldiers and 100 guns.
- Battle of Hill 60 – British forces held off German gas attacks for four days but a renewed attack on the fifth day resulted in the gas following the front line as opposed to crossing it, allowing more British troops to be overcome. This allowed German infantry of the 30th Division to advance and capture the front line on the lower slope of the hill.
- The Royal Navy issued an uncoded warning to all British commercial ships that German U-boats were seen active off the south coast of Ireland.
- The British 125th brigade of the 42nd Infantry Division arrived at Gallipoli to reinforce ANZAC Cove, allowing ANZAC forces to prepare for a second assault on the village of Krithia the following day.
- The 105th Infantry Division of the Imperial German Army was established.
- St. John's College was established in Nugegoda, British Ceylon as the first English-language school in the country.
- The all-girls public school Samudradevi Balika Vidyalaya was established in Nugegoda, British Ceylon.
- The association football organization Federação Mineira de Futebol was established to manage football clubs in Minas Gerais, Brazil and represent the clubs at the Brazilian Football Confederation.
- Born: Alice Faye, American singer and actress, best known for the Oscar-winning song "You'll Never Know" in the film Hello, Frisco, Hello; as Alice Jeanne Leppert, in New York City, United States (d. 1998)
- Died: Ronald Poulton, 25, English rugby player, centre for the England national rugby union team from 1909 to 1914, and Oxford University from 1908 to 1911; killed in action by a sniper near Ploegsteert, Belgium (b. 1889)

== May 6, 1915 (Thursday) ==
- Gorlice–Tarnów Offensive – Russian forces abandoned the city of Tarnów, Poland.
- Second Battle of Krithia – British, Australian and New Zealand forces launched an assault on Ottoman defenses on the Helles battlefield during the Gallipoli campaign but failed to advance further than 400 yards (370 metres).
- The Imperial Russian Army launched a major offensive on Anatolia and also threatened Van, Turkey.
- After receiving messages that a German U-boat sunk British merchant ship Candidate and nearly sunk the British ocean liner Arabic, Captain William Thomas Turner of the RMS Lusitania ordered the crew to make emergency preparations in case the ship was attacked and had to be abandoned, although passengers were not informed.
- Ross Sea party – A fierce winter storm unmoored the polar ship Aurora at McMurdo Sound in the Antarctic, causing her to drift. On board were 18 men including first officer Joseph Stenhouse while another 10 were marooned onshore; the six members involved in the sledge parties that were setting up supply depots for the main Imperial Trans-Antarctic Expedition, including expedition commander Aeneas Mackintosh, were stranded in Hut Point and four member scientists that were camped at Cape Evans.
- Baseball player Babe Ruth hit his first career home run off pitcher Jack Warhop for the Boston Red Sox.
- Born: Orson Welles, American actor and director, directed and produced Citizen Kane, considered by most film critics as one of the all-time greatest films, as well as acclaimed films The Magnificent Ambersons and Touch of Evil, and roles in The Third Man and Catch-22; as George Orson Welles, in Kenosha, Wisconsin, United States (d. 1985)

== May 7, 1915 (Friday) ==
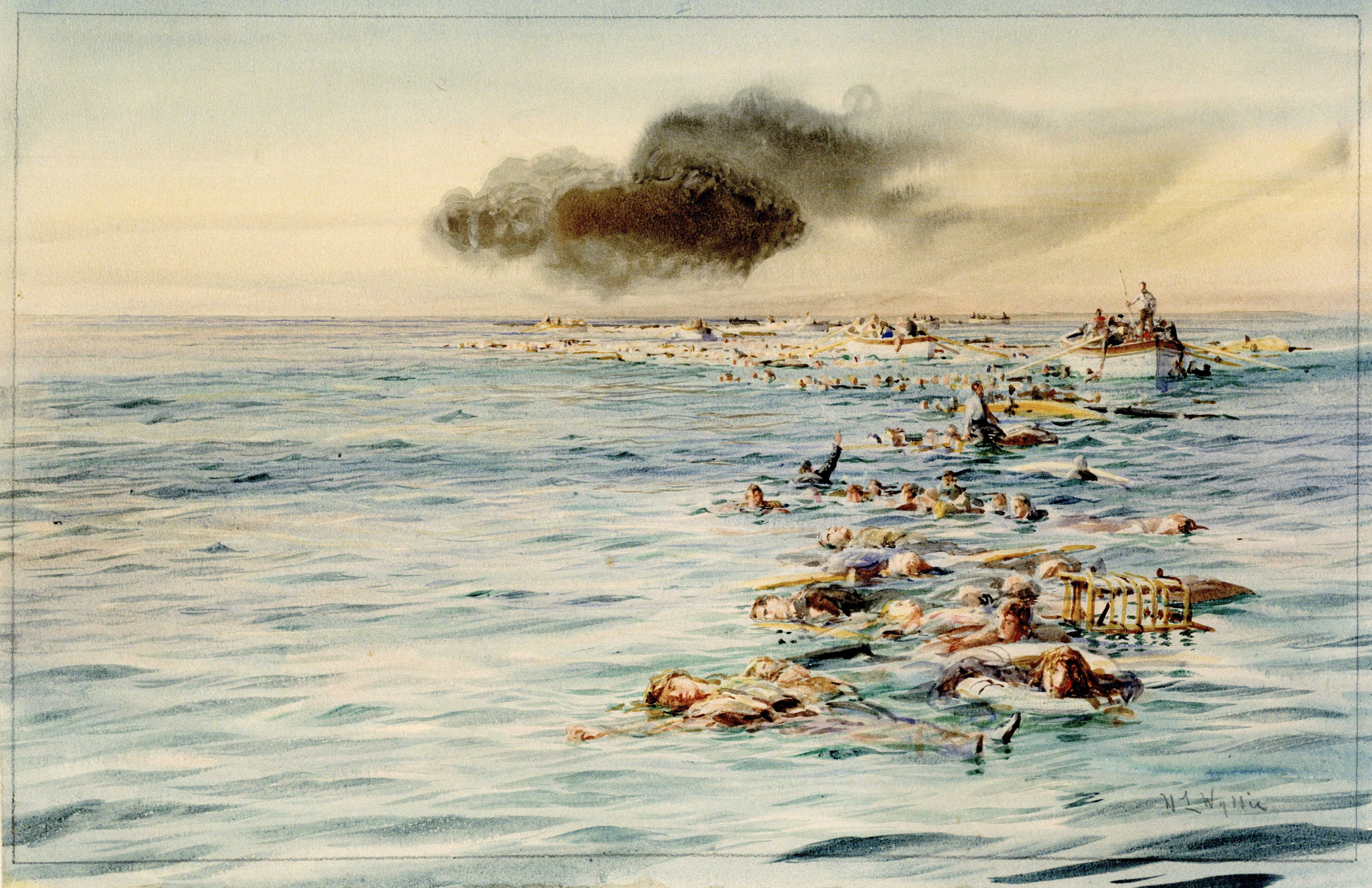
Painting by William Lionel Wyllie depicting casualties and survivors in the water and in lifeboats following the sinking of the RMS Lusitania.

- British ocean liner RMS Lusitania was sunk by the Imperial German Navy U-boat U-20 off the south-west coast of Old Head of Kinsale, Ireland, killing 1,197 passengers and crew en route from New York City to Liverpool. Among the notable passengers who died during the sinking included:
  - Thomas O'Brien Butler, Irish composer (b. 1861)
  - Marie Depage, Belgian nurse (b. 1872)
  - Justus Miles Forman, American writer (b. 1875)
  - Charles Frohman, American theater producer (b. 1856)
  - Elbert Hubbard, American writer and philosopher (b. 1856)
  - Alice Moore Hubbard, wife of Elbert Hubbard (b. 1861)
  - Hugh Lane, Irish art dealer, collector and benefactor (b. 1875)
  - Charles Klein, American playwright (b. 1867)
  - Basil Maturin, Irish preacher (b. 1847)
  - Frederick Stark Pearson, American engineer (b. 1861)
  - Alfred Gwynne Vanderbilt, American sportsman (b. 1877)
  - Lothrop Withington, American historian (b. 1856)
- Parliamentary elections were held in Denmark but, because of World War I, no campaigning took place and 104 out of 114 constituencies did not vote. Even so, ruling Danish political party Venstre retained majority of the 114 seats in the Danish Parliament.
- Battle of Hill 60 – Two British infantry companies failed to recapture the hill from the Germans, officially ending the battle. In all, the British 5th Infantry Division assigned to take Hill 60 had 3,100 casualties.
- The Sanuki Railway Company extended the Yosan Line in the Kagawa Prefecture, Japan, with station Tsushimanomiya serving the line.
- Died: Edward Frederick Robert Bage, 27, Australian explorer, member of the Australasian Antarctic Expedition in 1911 to 1914, recipient of the Polar Medal; killed in action during the Gallipoli campaign (b. 1888)

== May 8, 1915 (Saturday) ==
- Pressured by its inability to mobilize for war, China accepted a revision of the Twenty-One Demands made by Japan.
- Second Battle of Ypres – German forces bombarded and attacked Canadian forces defending the forward line of the Western Front at the Frezenberg ridge over five days.
- Second Battle of Krithia – New Zealand relieved the British forces who barely made it 800 yards (740 metres) towards the Ottoman line. The New Zealand pushed to gain another 400 yards (370 metres) before being pinned down. By evening, they launched a new attack backed by Australian support. They were able to capture a portion of the front trenches on one of the flanks but they were pushed back everywhere else, thus ending the battle.
- Bernhard Dernburg, former secretary for the Imperial Colonial Office of Germany, stated the sinking of the RMS Lusitania was justified as the ship "carried contraband of war" and "was classed as an auxiliary cruiser."
- Armenian genocide – Around 220 Armenian intellectuals arrested on April 24 were separated and sent to holding centres in Çankırı and Ayaş, Turkey.
- Ross Sea party – The polar ship Aurora was adrift in the ice and moving into the Ross Sea away from the Antarctic continent.
- Thoroughbred racehorse Regret with jockey Joe Notter won the 41st running of the Kentucky Derby with a time of 2:05.40. Regret was the first filly ever to win the Derby, causing Churchill Downs president Matt Winn to observe that because of Regret's win "the Derby was thus made an American institution."
- The Kew tram depot in Kew, Victoria, Australia began operations to serve the Melbourne area.
- Died: Henry McNeal Turner, 81, American religious leader, 12th Bishop for the African Methodist Episcopal Church (b. 1834)

== May 9, 1915 (Sunday) ==
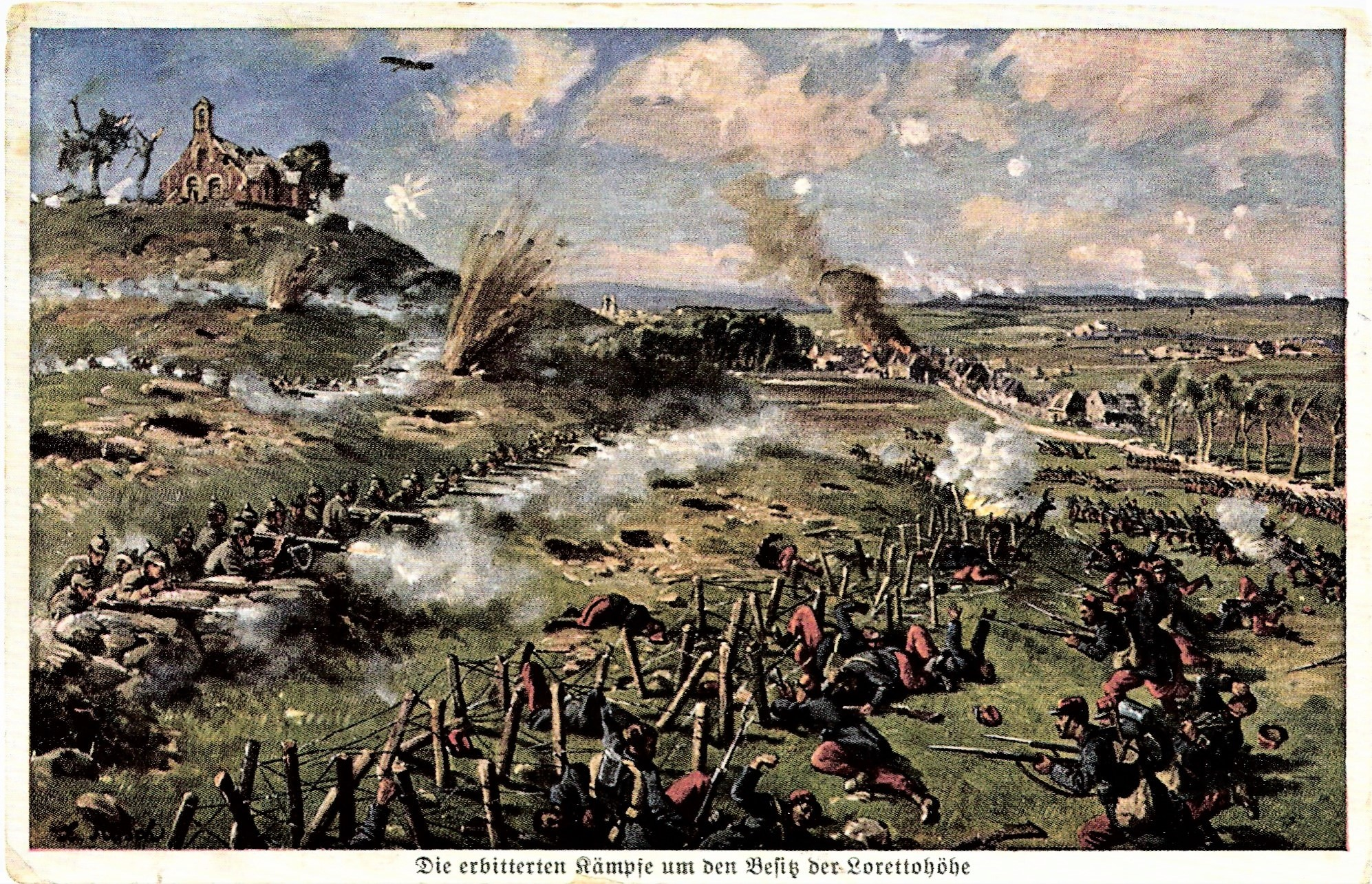
French and German soldiers fight at the opening of the Second Battle of Artois.

- Gorlice–Tarnów Offensive – Grand Duke Nicholas permitted a limited withdrawal as Austro-Hungarian Third and Fourth Armies pressed forward in the Carpathian Mountains.
- Second Battle of Artois – The French Tenth Army launched a major offensive against the Germans in the Western Front in northeastern France, capturing a few front line trenches and taking 3,000 Germans prisoner along with 10 field guns and 15 machine guns. However, no successes were made capturing any major villages or towns.
- Battle of Aubers Ridge – The British First Army launched a simultaneous attack on the German line north of the French Tenth Army to widen the enemy's defensive gap but failed to break through.
- The German government released an official statement confirming an Imperial German Navy U-boat had sunk the RMS Lusitania but maintained the ship was armed and was transporting "war materials." However, the Port of New York issued an official denial of Germany's charges, saying the ship had been inspected and had not been outfitted with any guns nor it was carrying any munitions aside from some ammo for small firearms, a common practice among cargo shipping.
- Born: Robert Galbraith Heath, American biological psychiatrist, founder of the Department of Psychiatry and Neurology at Tulane University, in Pittsburgh (d. 1999)
- Died:
  - François Faber, 28, Luxembourgian cyclist, first foreigner to win the Tour de France in 1909; killed in action at the Second Battle of Artois (b. 1887)
  - Anthony Wilding, 31, New Zealand tennis player, bronze medalist at the 1912 Summer Olympics and triple World Championship winner in 1913; killed in action at the Battle of Aubers Ridge (b. 1883)

== May 10, 1915 (Monday) ==
- Second Battle of Artois – The French launched a feint attack as a decoy while new cavalry divisions were moved in to assist the Tenth Army. Meanwhile, Germany launched a counter-attack and recaptured some of their trenches and tunnels between the villages of Carency and Souchez, and repulsed an attack at Neuville-Vitasse.
- Action of 10 May 1915 – The Ottoman battleship Yavuz Sultan Selim, formerly the SMS Goeben, tried to intercept Russian naval ships Tri Sviatitelia and Panteleimon sighted earlier by an Ottoman destroyer in the Black Sea. Instead, it mistakenly ran into a Russian naval squadron that included Evstafi, Ioann Zlatoust, and Rostislav. The Yavuz Sultan Selim exchanged fire with the squadron for 15 minutes but, outnumbered, it backed off and escaped.
- An Imperial German Army Zeppelin attempted to bomb Southend-on-Sea, England, but was driven off by unexpected gunfire. On retreat, airship commander Erich Linnarz allegedly scrawled a threat to return on a calling card from his wallet and dropping it in a weighted canister found on Canvey Island.
- U.S. President Woodrow Wilson countered public demands for the United States to declare war on Germany for the sinking of the RMS Lusitania, stating while in Philadelphia, "There is such a thing as a nation being so right that it does not need to convince others by force that it is right."
- Lieutenant Denys Corbett Wilson of the Royal Flying Corps died after being shot down while flying a Morane-Saulnier airplane on a reconnaissance mission over France.
- The Escadrille SPA.57 of the French Air Force was established near Arras, France.
- The London Underground extended the Bakerloo line with a new tube station at Willesden Junction.
- The first edition of the El Salvadoran daily newspaper La Prensa Gráfica was published.
- Born:
  - Denis Thatcher, British businessman, husband of UK Prime Minister Margaret Thatcher; in London, England (d. 2003)
  - Beyers Naudé, South African theologian and activist, founder of the Christian Institute of Southern Africa; as Christiaan Frederick Beyers Naudé, in Roodepoort, Transvaal, South Africa (d. 2004)
  - Anthony Peraino, American mobster, member of the Colombo crime family who financed the pornographic hit Deep Throat; in New York City, United States (d. 1996)
- Died:
  - Gaston Cros, 53, French archaeologist and army officer, commander of French forces during the Zaian War, lead the archeological dig of the ancient city of Girsu in Mesopotamia (now Iraq), recipient of the Legion of Honour, Order of the Dragon of Annam, Ordre des Palmes académiques, and Croix de guerre; (killed in action during the Second Battle of Artois (b. 1861)
  - Karl Lamprecht, 59, German historian, leading expert on Germany's economic and artistic history (b. 1856)

== May 11, 1915 (Tuesday) ==
- Second Battle of Artois – French forces captured key high ground from the Germans, depriving them of strategic viewing points of the battlefield.
- Gorlice–Tarnów Offensive – Russian forces regrouped and dug in at the San River in what is now southeastern Poland to slow the Central Powers advance.
- The Royal Flying Corps established the No. 18 Squadron at RAF Northolt in London Borough of Hillingdon, England.
- Royal Navy seaplane tender HMS Ben-my-Chree tried to intercept a German airship in the North Sea using a Sopwith seaplane. However, the launching platform collapsed as the plane tried to take off, leaving the Zeppelin to go on and bomb four surfaced British submarines (without damaging them).
- The Egyptian-Armenian daily newspaper Arev published its first issue.
- The Boston Opera Company declared bankruptcy.

== May 12, 1915 (Wednesday) ==
- Gorlice–Tarnów Offensive – General August von Mackensen was ordered to advance his forces to the San River and take bridgeheads on the east bank.
- Second Battle of Artois – French forces renewed offenses against the German line, capturing 3,000 enemy troops in the process.
- British battleship HMS Goliath was torpedoed and sunk by Ottoman destroyer Muâvenet-i Millîye in the Dardanelles with the loss of 570 of her 700 crew.
- Defense of Van – Ottoman forces failed to slow the Russian advance at the town of Ardjish north of Van, Turkey.
- South African troops occupied Windhoek, the capital of German South West Africa.
- Tobias Norris became premier of Manitoba, replacing Rodmond Roblin who was forced to resign from office after a commission appointed by the Lieutenant Governor of Manitoba found the government guilty of corruption in the tending of contracts for new legislative buildings.
- James Bryce of the Committee on Alleged German Outrages released a report detailing a mix of confirmed and unsubstantiated reports of atrocities allegedly committed by Germany during the first months of World War I. The report was widely accepted and translated into 30 languages.
- The 2nd Aero Squadron of the United States Army was formed.
- Ross Sea party – While continuing to drift northward in the ice, the crew of the polar ship Aurora managed to set up a temporary wireless aerial and communicate to the stranded members on shore at Cape Evans but communications failed to get through.
- The South African media company Naspers started out as a newspaper and magazine publisher founded by National Party leader J. B. M. Hertzog in Cape Town, South Africa.
- The association football club Nexø was established in Nexø, Denmark.
- Born: Brother Roger, Swiss religious leader, founder of the Taizé Community; as Roger Schultz, in Provence, Switzerland (d. 2005)
- Died: William H. Forwood, 76, American army medical officer, 19th Surgeon General of the United States Army (b. 1838)

== May 13, 1915 (Thursday) ==
- Italian Prime Minister Antonio Salandra offered his resignation in the face of growing public opposition of entering World War I in accordance with the Treaty of London, but opposition leader Giovanni Giolitti, fearful of nationalist disorder that might break into open rebellion, declined to succeed him.
- U.S. President Woodrow Wilson sent Germany the first of three letters related to the sinking of the RMS Lusitania calling for Germany to abandon submarine warfare against commercial vessels.
- Second Battle of Ypres – Canadian forces prevented the forward line at Frezenberg ridge from falling into German hands but suffered massive casualties. In particular, the Princess Patricia's Canadian Light Infantry saw its 700-man force reduced to 150 men when the battle ended. As a result, the unit's unofficial motto – "Holding up the whole damn line" – is still used today.
- British officer Captain Julian Grenfell was mortally wounded by shrapnel when a shell landed a few yards away from where he was standing while talking to fellow officers of the 1st The Royal Dragoons. He was taken to a hospital in Boulogne, France, where he died thirteen days later. His poem "Into Battle" was published in The Times the day after his death. His younger brother, Gerald William "Billy" Grenfell, was killed in action two months later.
- In the facing of growing anti-German sentiment in Australia following the sinking of the Lusitania, the German Club in Sydney notified the Commissioner of New South Wales Police that it was the club's intention to voluntarily close given the heightened threat of damage and violence against Australians with German heritage.
- The Kyoto Dentō Company extended the Katsuyama Eiheiji Line in the Fukui Prefecture, Japan, with station Oiwakeguchi serving the line.

== May 14, 1915 (Friday) ==
- Second Battle of Artois – French forces captured the village of Carency but stopped from advancing on Souchez.
- Gorlice–Tarnów Offensive – The Central Powers forces reached the San River in what is now southeastern Poland.
- May 14 Revolt – A mutinous group of naval marines, army soldiers, and members of the National Republican Guard of Portugal took control of several naval ships in Lisbon harbor, including the battleship Vasco da Game, in a revolt against the presidency of Manuel de Arriaga. The resulting insurrection between soldiers, sailors, police and civilians resulted in 200 deaths and over 1,000 injuries.
- The first local of the Fraternal Order of Police was established in Pittsburgh.
- The Mille Lacs National Wildlife Refuge was established in central Minnesota to protecting breeding spaces for various bird species, and is the smallest National Wildlife Refuge in the United States.

== May 15, 1915 (Saturday) ==
- Battle of Festubert – The British First Army under command of General Douglas Haig launched a night-time attack on a 3-mile (4.8 km) portion of the German line from Neuve-Chapelle, France, in the north to the village of Festubert in the south.
- Second Battle of Artois – The Germans halted any further French advances into their territory.
- Singapore Mutiny – The court of inquiry into a mutiny among the Indian 5th Light Infantry in Singapore concluded causes for it were inconclusively established. More than 200 Indian soldiers and officer were tried and 47 were sentenced to execution by firing squad. The remaining 600 Indian soldiers and officers that did not mutiny were ordered to serve with Allied operations in Africa.
- The second Far Eastern Championship Games were held in Shanghai with China, Japan and the Philippines participating.
- The first reference of jazz in relation to music may have come from Tom Brown and his New Orleans band as they began performing in Chicago and started advertising themselves as a "Jass Band."
- The Gourock Times weekly newspaper began publishing in Gourock, Scotland. It would fold in 1980.
- The association football club Real Unión was established in Irun, Spain.
- Born:
  - Hilda Bernstein, British-American writer and activist, author of The World That Was Ours; as Hilda Schwarz, in London, England (d. 2006)
  - Paul Samuelson, American economist, recipient of the Nobel Memorial Prize in Economic Sciences, author of Foundations of Economic Analysis; in Gary, Indiana, United States (d. 2009)
  - Shozo Makino, Japanese swimmer, silver medalist at the 1932 Summer Olympics and bronze medalist at the 1936 Summer Olympics; in Shizuoka Prefecture, Empire of Japan (present-day Japan) (d. 1987)

== May 16, 1915 (Sunday) ==
- Gorlice–Tarnów Offensive – The Central Powers established bridgeheads over the San River and prepared to assault Przemyśl and the 44 forts that surrounded it.
- Defense of Van – While evacuating women and children in Van, Turkey by way of port ships under cover of artillery fire, Ottoman soldiers massacred 6,000 Armenians.
- Battle of Festubert – Renewed attacks on the German line only resulted in heavy losses for the British.
- Two Royal Naval Air Service planes intercepted two Imperial German Navy Zeppelins, badly damaging one using bombs dropped on its envelope from above.
- Born: Percy Charles Pickard, British air force officer, commander of the No. 51 and No. 161 Squadron during World War II, recipient of the Distinguished Service Order, Distinguished Flying Cross, and Czechoslovak War Cross; in Handsworth, South Yorkshire, England (killed in action, 1944)

== May 17, 1915 (Monday) ==
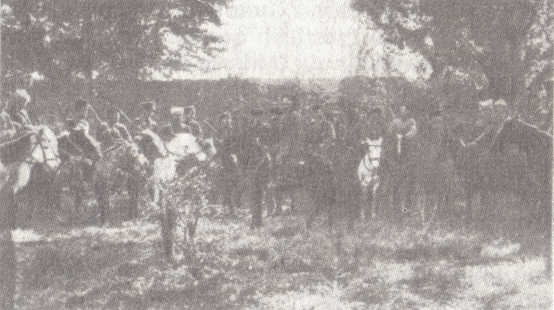
Russian and Armenian relief forces arrive in Van.

- The last purely Liberal government in Great Britain ended when the prime minister H. H. Asquith formed an all-party coalition government, in response to a cabinet split caused by fallout from the Shell Crisis.
- Defense of Van – Governor Djevdet Bey of the Van Province abandoned Van, Turkey and joined the 1st Expeditionary Force under the command of Lieutenant Colonel Halil Kut, leaving the city in temporary control of the Armenian militia.
- Germany released a White Book that refuted the claims of German war-time atrocities made in a report by the Committee on Alleged German Outrages five days earlier while outlining their reasons for going to war against the Triple Entente.
- Italian-American mob boss Giosue Gallucci, head of one of the Camorra gangs in New York City, was shot along with his son Lucas in a coffee shop in East Harlem. His son died the next day and Gallucci died from his wounds four days later. His murder created a power vacuum among the crime families, resulting in the Mafia–Camorra War the following year.

== May 18, 1915 (Tuesday) ==
- Battle of Festubert – The 1st Canadian Division was mobilized to attack the German line with support from a British division but failed to progress against enemy artillery.
- British submarine HMS E11 infiltrated Turkish waters past the Dardanelles.
- The 4th Guards Infantry Division of the Imperial German Army was established.
- The Belgium monarchy created a civilian variant of the Civic Decoration medal for Belgian civilians and non-combatants that served with distinction during World War I.
- Born: Neil W. Chamberlain, American economist, known for his concepts on bargaining power; in Charlotte, North Carolina, United States (d. 2006)
- Died:
  - William Bridges, 54, Australian army officer, commander of the 1st Australian Division during the Gallipoli campaign; succumbed to injuries sustained from sniper fire (b. 1861)
  - Amos W. Barber, 54, American politician, second Governor of Wyoming (b. 1861)

== May 19, 1915 (Wednesday) ==
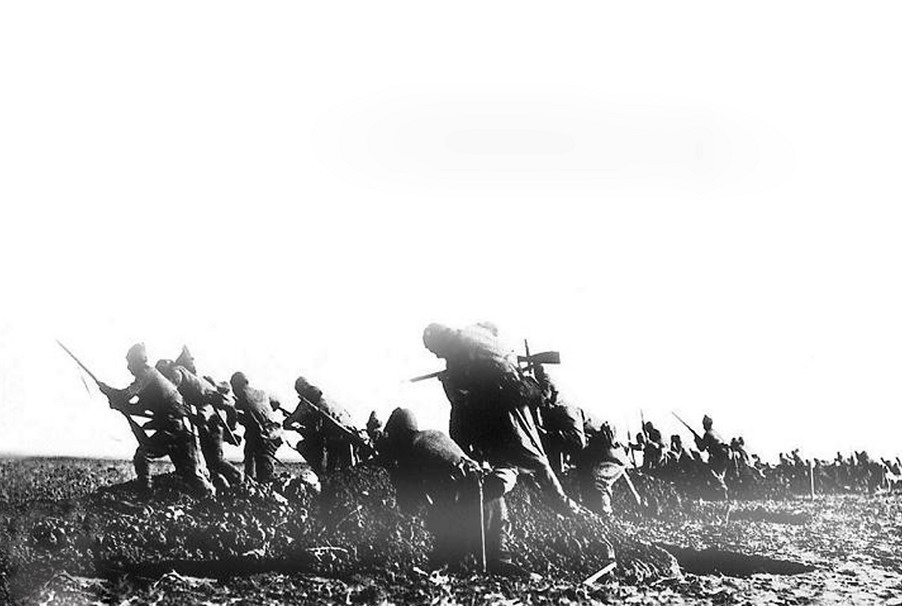
Turkish troops attacking during the Gallipoli campaign.

- Gallipoli campaign – The Ottoman army launched a third attack on Anzac Cove with 42,000 soldiers but were repelled by the 17,000 ANZAC troops. Ottoman forces sustained 13,000 casualties including 3,000 killed, while ANZAC forces had 468 wounded and 160 killed. Among the noted casualties was Australian army medic John Simpson Kirkpatrick, who innovated the use of mules as stretchers for transporting wounded across the rugged terrain.
- May 14 Revolt – After the revolt among the Portuguese military had been quelled, Manuel de Arriaga announced his decision to resign as President of Portugal.
- The Grosvenor Picture Palace opened in Manchester.
- The Shire of Mundubbera was established in Queensland, Australia.
- Born: Renée Asherson, British actress, known for Shakespearean stage performances with The Old Vic, Liverpool Playhouse, Westminster Theatre, and films roles such as The Way Forward; as Dorothy Renée Ascherson, in London, England (d. 2014)

== May 20, 1915 (Thursday) ==
- Battle of Festubert – A renewed British offensive started to yield success against the Germans, but it would take five more days of fighting before the French village of Festubert was captured.
- Defense of Van – Russian forces entered Van, Turkey, providing needed relief for Armenians resisting the onslaught of Ottoman troops.
- Cleveland Railway opened the Courtyard and Eaton stations to serve the Shaker Boulevard rail line in Cleveland.
- The Tucumán Lawn Tennis Club was formed in San Miguel de Tucumán, Argentina. Initially offering tennis and cricket, it has since expanded into a multi-sports club with its rugby union Tucumán LT being its flagship team.
- The sports club Amsterdam was formed in Amsterdam which included rugby, badminton, and even basketball.
- Born: Moshe Dayan, Israeli military leader and politician, commander during the 1948 Arab–Israeli War, chief of staff of the Israel Defense Forces during the Suez Crisis, and Defense Minister during the Six-Day War in 1967; in Degania Alef, Ottoman Syria (present-day Israel) (d. 1981)
- Died: Charles Francis Adams Jr., 79, American rail executive, president of the Union Pacific Railroad from 1884 to 1890 (b. 1835)

== May 21, 1915 (Friday) ==
- Second Battle of Artois – France consolidated their forces while under heavy German fire but lost key positions.
- Armenian leader Krikor Zohrab and another fellow deputy with the Ottoman Parliament were arrested and ordered to Aleppo to be held while awaiting court-martial, follow the leader's public protests of atrocities committed against Armenians from April 24. He would be murdered in July during the height of the Armenian genocide.
- The SPAD S.A aircraft was first flown in France, but its design proved challenging for most pilots and was replaced soon after.

== May 22, 1915 (Saturday) ==
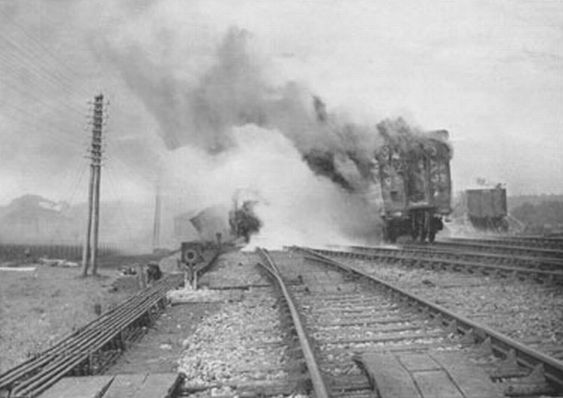
A burning carriage in the aftermath of a train collision at Quintinshill, Scotland.

- A rail collision and fire in Quintinshill, Scotland killed 226 people, most of them troops, in what was the largest number of fatalities in a rail accident in Great Britain.

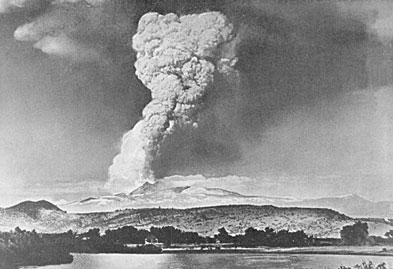
Eruption of Lassen Peak

- Lassen Peak, one of the Cascade Volcanoes in California, erupted sending an ash plume 30,000 feet in the air and devastating the nearby area with mudslides and hot gas clouds mixed with debris. It is the last volcano to erupt in the contiguous United States until the 1980 eruption of Mount St. Helens.
- T. J. Ryan was elected Premier of Queensland in Australia, defeating incumbent Digby Denham with 52% of the vote.
- Thoroughbred racehorse Tartarean ridden by jockey Harry Watts won the 56th running of Canada's King's Plate race with time of 2:09.20.
- The Italian Futurist magazine Lacerba published its last issue after a brief two-year run in Florence.

== May 23, 1915 (Sunday) ==
German naval officer Hellmuth von Mücke, first officer of the SMS Emden.

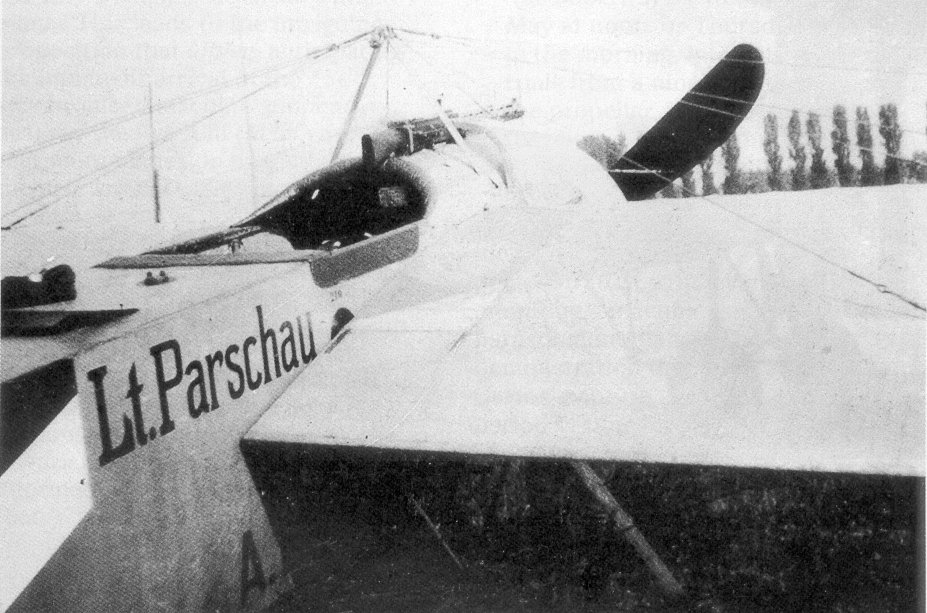
The model of the first Fokker Eindecker fighter plane flew by Otto Parschau.

- Italy joined the Allies after they declared war on Austria-Hungary.
- Faisal bin Hussein received the Damascus Protocol document while visiting the city during a diplomatic mission to Constantinople. Authored by Arab secret societies, the document outlined an Arab revolt against the Ottoman Empire with support of the British, resulting in an independent Arab nation state.
- Second Battle of Artois – French forces began to take ground from the Germans as they advanced on Souchez.
- German submarine SM UB-3 was lost in the Gulf of İzmir 80 nautical miles (150 km) off İzmir with the loss of all fourteen crew.
- The Austro-Hungarian Navy began bombarding the port of Ancona, Italy, soon after the country declared war on the Central Powers.
- Hellmuth von Mücke, first officer of the SMS Emden, safely led 48 members of his surviving landing party to Constantinople where he reported to the German admiral stationed there. From the time they were stranded on the Cocos Islands in the Indian Ocean to their arrival in the Ottoman capital, von Mücke had successfully led his men 11,000 km over sea and land, losing only four on the way. He and his men arrived in Germany later that summer as heroes.
- German pilot Otto Parschau flew the first of the Fokker Eindecker fighters, designed by Anthony Fokker, in Douai, France. The aircraft's high maneuverability, combined with synchronization gear that allowed fighter pilots to fire mounted machine gun bullets between the plane's propellers, gave German air superiority over the Allies for most of 1915 and 1916, to the point the fighters were referred to as Fokker Scourge.
- The sports club Älvsjö was established in Stockholm. Initially the club included association football, bandy, hockey, and floorball. In 1993, football separated and became its own club.
- German noble Prince Heinrich established the War Merit Cross to be awarded to all ranks for exemplary conduct in combat.
- Born:
  - Jim Chamberlin, Canadian aerodynamic engineer, member of the design team of the Avro Arrow and later for the Apollo program; as James Arthur Chamberlin, in Kamloops, British Columbia, Canada (d. 1981)
  - S. Donald Stookey, American inventor, patented 60 inventions related to ceramics or glass, including FotoForm which is used by CorningWare; as Stanley Donald Stookey, in Hay Springs, Nebraska, United States (d. 2014)

== May 24, 1915 (Monday) ==
- The term "crime against humanity" is used for the first time by governments in joint public statement issued by the Allied governments to Ottoman government accusing them of committing genocide on ethnic Armenians within the Ottoman Empire.
- British military diplomat Aubrey Herbert and Ottoman senior army officer Mustafa Kemal Atatürk agreed to call an eight-hour truce at Gallipoli so both sides could recover and bury the dead.
- Second Battle of Ypres – Germans released a gas attack on British forces defending a 7-kilometre (4.3 mi) front near Hooge, Belgium, forcing them to retreat.
- The bombardment on Ancona, Italy, ended with 63 killed and at least one Italian destroyer damaged.
- Irish soldier John Condon for the British Army was killed in action, becoming the youngest British soldier to die in World War I.
- The prototype for the Siemens-Schuckert R.I airplane was first flown in Berlin and delivered for military service the following month.
- Stage actress Alice Brady made her first credited film debut in The Boss, produced by her father William A. Brady.

== May 25, 1915 (Tuesday) ==
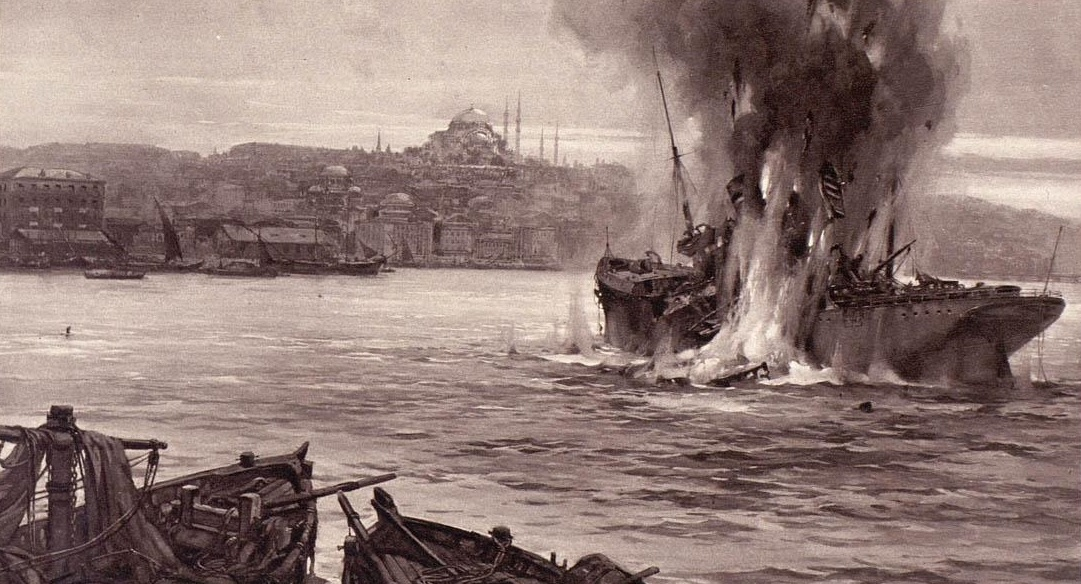
Royal Navy submarine HMS E11 torpedoes the "Stamboul" off Constantinople.

- China agreed to the Twenty-One Demands made by Japan.
- Russia, China and Mongolia signed the Treaty of Kyakhta which recognized the autonomy of Outer Mongolia. However, most Mongolians opposed the treaty because it did not recognize an independent, all-Mongolian state. The treaty became moot following the 1917 October Revolution in Russia.
- Second Battle of Artois – French forces launched assaults to take Andres, Pas-de-Calais, France from the Germans.
- Battle of Festubert – The British captured the French village of Festubert from the Germans. After 10 days of fighting, British forces had only advanced three kilometres (1.9 miles) while losing over 16,000 casualties, while German defenses only sustained 5,000.
- Second Battle of Ypres – The British failed in retaking trenches lost to the German gas attack the day before, forcing them to retreat 1 kilometre (0.62 mi) northwards. The battle ended with the Germans compressing the Ypres salient by 5 kilometres (3.1 mi). Casualties on both sides were massive, with the Germans suffering close to 35,000 while the British were worse at just over 59,000. French forces sustained close to 22,000 casualties while the Canadian forces had close to 6,000. The city of Ypres itself was completely demolished by artillery fire.
- British battleship HMS Triumph was torpedoed and sunk in the Dardanelles by SM U-21 with the loss of 78 of her 803 crew. Survivors were rescued by HMS Chelmer.
- Dutch ocean liner Rijndam collided with Norwegian ocean liner SS Joseph J. Cuneo in the Atlantic Ocean 10 nautical miles (19 km) south of the Nantucket Shoals of the United States. Two hundred and thirty passengers were rescued by U.S. Navy ships USS Louisiana, USS Michigan, USS South Carolina and USS Texas. Rijndam was subsequently repaired and returned to service.
- The Asquith coalition ministry, a national wartime coalition government to lead Great Britain, went into effect. However, Irish leader John Redmond chose not to join and garnered support from Irish Parliamentary Party.
- British submarine HMS E11 slipped in Constantinople harbor in a search for the German warships SMS Goeben and SMS Breslau, but instead torpedoed Turkish transport ship Stambou before escaping. The attack caused a panic in the city and forced the SMS Breslau to relocate.
- Ross Sea party – The polar ship Aurora drifted toward the Victoria Land coastline on the western side of the Ross Ice Shelf in the Antarctic.
- The French Army established the 102nd Fortress Division for the 6th Army.
- An ashram for Mahatma Gandhi was prepared by Jivanlal Desai, barrister and friend to Gandhi, just outside the city of Ahmedabad, India. However, Gandhi wanted to practice farming and other pursuits and would need more usable land, so the ashram was relocated two years later to a suburb in Ahmedabad on the banks of the Sabarmati River.
- Born: Robin Day, British furniture designer, designed the polypropylene stacking chair; in High Wycombe, England (d. 2010)

== May 26, 1915 (Wednesday) ==
- The German Army of the Niemen was formed under the command of General Otto von Below, who had previously commanded a reserve corps unit under the 8th Army. The army was meant to create diversionary action against the Russian armies to distract them from Gorlice–Tarnów Offensive planned to break through the Eastern Front. The original 8th Army was dissolved in September, only to be renewed using the diversionary army under von Below.
- The Roman Catholic Diocese of Arauca was established in Arauca, Colombia.
- Born: Tommy Walker, Scottish association football player, inside forward for Midlothian and the Scotland national football team from 1933 to 1948; as Thomas Walker, in Livingston, West Lothian, Scotland (d. 1993)
- Died: Julian Grenfell, 27, English poet and army officer, author of the poem "Into Battle"; died from encephalitis after being injured by a shell in Boulogne, France (b. 1888)

== May 27, 1915 (Thursday) ==
- The General Assembly of the Ottoman Empire passed the Tehcir Law which authorized the deportation of the entire Armenian populations in the Empire.
- Armenian resistance against the Ottoman Empire began to be organized in Urfa, Turkey.
- British minelayer HMS Princess Irene exploded and sank while loading mines off Sheerness with the loss of 352 lives.
- British battleship HMS Majestic was torpedoed and sunk by German submarine SM U-21 in the Dardanelles and sank with the loss of 49 of her 672 crew.
- British sloop HMS Veronica was launched at Dunlop Bremner & Company in Port Glasgow, Scotland and would serve with the New Zealand Division of the Royal Navy. The ship notably rescued hundred of survivors following the 1931 Hawke's Bay earthquake in New Zealand.
- The Alpenkorps were established in the Imperial German Army as an elite mountain fighting unit.
- A resistance group formed in Urfa, Turkey (now Şanlıurfa) in response to the deportation of Armenians.
- The first edition of Pioneer-News was published with the headline "Status of the New Townsite" referring to what was to become Anchorage, Alaska. The paper eventually became the Anchorage Times.
- Born: Herman Wouk, American writer, author of The Caine Mutiny, The Winds of War and War and Remembrance; in New York City, United States (d. 2019)

== May 28, 1915 (Friday) ==
- Second Battle of Artois – The French failed to capture Andres, Pas-de-Calais, France from the Germans.
- Battle for No.3 Post – Soldiers with New Zealand Mounted Rifles Brigade fought members of the Ottoman 19th Infantry Division to capture a strategic defense post on the ridge overlooking ANZAC Cove.
- Riots began to break out between the ethnic Sinhalese and Muslims in Kandy, British Ceylon before spreading to Colombo.
- The Royal Flying Corps opened a military aerodrome at Norfolk, England.
- Born:
  - Morton Smith, American academic, most known for the discovery of the Mar Saba letter which allegedly contained references to the Secret Gospel of Mark; in Philadelphia, United States (d. 1991)
  - Joseph Greenberg, American linguist, leading expert in African languages; in New York City, United States (d. 2001)
- Died: Yenovk Shahen, 34, Armenian stage actor celebrated in the Ottoman Empire for his performances in Victor Hugo's Le roi s'amuse, Othello, and The Merchant of Venice; murdered during the Armenian genocide (b. 1881)

== May 29, 1915 (Saturday) ==
- Manuel de Arriaga officially resigned as president of Portugal, allowing Prime Minister Teófilo Braga to take over as the second president of the country.
- Ottoman troops attacked the 15th Australian Battalion but were driven back, the last major offensive Ottoman forces would attempt during the Gallipoli campaign.
- Battle for No.3 Post – New Zealand forces successfully captured a key defense post overlooking ANZAC Cove and prepared to defend it from counterattacks by the Ottomans.
- British ocean liner Merion was torpedoed and damaged in the Mediterranean Sea by German submarine UB-8 and sank two days later.
- British cruiser HMS Champion was launched by Hawthorn Leslie and Company in Tyneside, England. It would participate in the Battle of Jutland the following year.
- Goodall Park was opened for professional baseball in Sanford, Maine and is the current home for the ball team Sanford Mainers.
- The city of Lake Alfred, Florida was established.
- Died: John G. McCullough, 79, American politician, 49th Governor of Vermont (d. 1835)

== May 30, 1915 (Sunday) ==
- Gorlice–Tarnów Offensive – Eleventh German Army's artillery began to bombard forts around Przemyśl.
- Battle for No.3 Post – Ottoman forces successfully recaptured a key defense post from New Zealand forces, ending the battle with 200 casualties for the Ottomans and 104 wounded and 42 dead among the New Zealand Mounted Rifles Brigade.
- U.S. President Woodrow Wilson dedicated the memorial site honoring those who died during the sinking of the U.S. Navy cruiser USS Maine in 1898 in the Arlington National Cemetery, Virginia.
- Shinano Railway extended the Ōito Line in the Nagano Prefecture, Japan, with station Nakagaya serving the line.
- A rail station was opened in Helensburgh, New South Wales to serve the South Coast line in Australia.
- Pearl City was established near Boca Raton, Florida as a segregated neighborhood for African-American workers.
- Born:
  - Henry Aaron Hill, American chemist, first African American president of the American Chemical Society; in St. Joseph, Missouri, United States (d. 1979)
  - Jerome Wiesner, American academic and engineer, chair of the President's Science Advisory Committee during the John F. Kennedy administration, president of Massachusetts Institute of Technology from 1971 to 1980; in Detroit, United States (d. 1994)
  - Ray Crowe, American basketball coach, head of the Crispus Attucks High School basketball team from 1950 and 1957, Indiana High School Boys Basketball Tournament champion in 1955, the first time an all-black high school team won the Indiana state championship; in Franklin, Indiana, United States (d. 2003)
  - Martin Manulis, American television producer, best known for the 1950s CBS Television specials Playhouse 90 and Studio One; in New York City, United States (d. 2007)
  - Exterminator, American racehorse, winner of the 1918 Kentucky Derby; in Lexington, Kentucky, United States (d. 1945)
- Died: Marcelo Azcárraga Palmero, 82, Spanish state leader, 13th Prime Minister of Spain (b. 1832)

== May 31, 1915 (Monday) ==
- Defense of Van – Russian general Nikolai Yudenich arrived in Van, Turkey and arranged for Armenian resistance leader Aram Manukian to become governor of the Armenian provisional government.
- Second Battle of Artois – The Germans repulsed the French advance on Souchez, France, after six days of fighting.
- Battle of Amara – British Indian and Ottoman troops clashed in the marshes of the Tigris between the towns of Amara and Qurna, Mesopotamia (now Iraq).
- Second Battle of Garua – British and French colonial troops laid siege to German forts around Garua, German Cameroon (now Cameroon).
- The Imperial German Army carried out its first airship raid on London using the L38 Zeppelin. It dropped 1,400 kilograms (3,000 lb) of bombs on the eastern suburb of the city, killing seven people and injuring 14.
- The 11th Indian Division was disbanded following the Raid on the Suez Canal and became primarily a defense force for the canal.
- Italian race driver Ralph DePalma won the 5th running of the Indianapolis 500 at the Indianapolis Motor Speedway in a Mercedes 18/100.
- Born:
  - Judith Wright, Australian poet, known for her poetry collections such as Birds; in Armidale, New South Wales, Australia (d. 2000)
  - Jack Real, American aerospace engineer, designer of many Lockheed aircraft, confidant to Howard Hughes from 1957 to the billionaire's death in 1976; in Calumet, Michigan, United States (d. 2005)
  - Carmen Herrera, Cuban-American artist, member of the abstract expressionism in New York City; in Havana, Cuba
- Died: Victor Child Villiers, 70, Australian statesman, 18th Governor of New South Wales (b. 1845)
