= Varsity (pub chain) =

British student-focused pub chain

- Company type: Brand
- Industry: Hospitality
- Predecessor: Defunct
- Founded: Mid-1990s
- Founder: Wolverhampton & Dudley
- Headquarters: Luton, England
- Area served: England and Wales
- Products: 23 student-themed pubs
- Owner: Stonegate Pub Company (2013–present); Wolverhampton & Dudley (1990s–2003)
- Website: Stonegate Pub Company

Varsity was a British student-focused pub chain that operated from the mid-1990s to 2013.

== History ==
Varsity was founded by Wolverhampton & Dudley in the mid-1990s, and was named after annual university sports competitions. Its main competitor was Scream Pubs, though Varsity was more sports-orientated. Varsity operated the "V Card", one of the first loyalty cards, which allowed a cheaper price for some food and drinks.

The first Varsity opened in Wolverhampton and was the site of concerts by numerous notable musicians throughout the late 1990s and early 2000s, including Queens of the Stone Age, Incubus, Baka Beyond, The Olivia Tremor Control, Headswim, Hurricane #1, The Idoru, Kenickie, The High Llamas, Colin MacIntyre, Ian McNabb, Mundy, Gorky's Zygotic Mynci, Heather Nova, Mike Peters, 3 Colours Red, Sigue Sigue Sputnik, and Theaudience.

In 2001, Silverfleet Capital's Barracuda Group bought 50 pubs from Wolverhampton & Dudley for £37.25 million, which included the entire Varsity chain. In 2005, the Barracuda Group was sold to Charterhouse Capital Partners for £262 million. By 2006, the company had expanded to 36 Varsity pubs. In 2012, Barracuda was renamed to the Bramwell Pub Company.

The original Wolverhampton site closed in 2012, after the University of Wolverhampton made a successful bid to purchase the building from its struggling owners. In 2013, the Bramwell Pub Company went into administration and the Stonegate Pub Company bought 78 of its pubs, including the Varsities. The pub in Coventry is now the only one still bearing the Varsity name, though it is still operated by Stonegate.

== Sites ==
- Aberystwyth
- Bangor
- Bolton
- Cardiff
- Coventry
- Durham
- Gloucester
- Huddersfield
- Hull
- Leeds
- Leicester
- Lincoln
- Loughborough
- Manchester
- Preston
- Sheffield
- Roath
- Southampton
- Southend-on-Sea
- Sunderland
- Swansea
- Wolverhampton

== Gallery ==
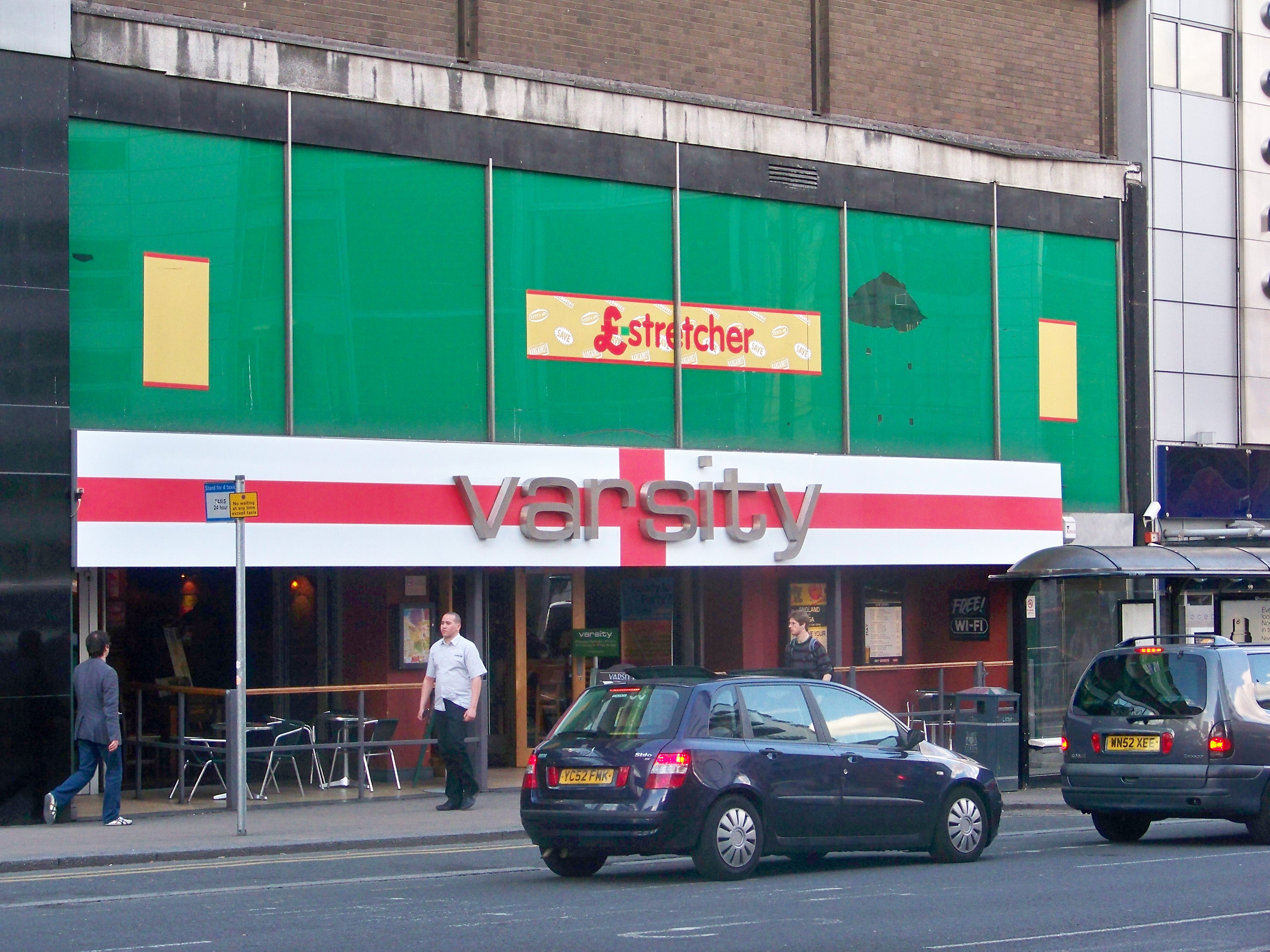
Varsity in Leeds

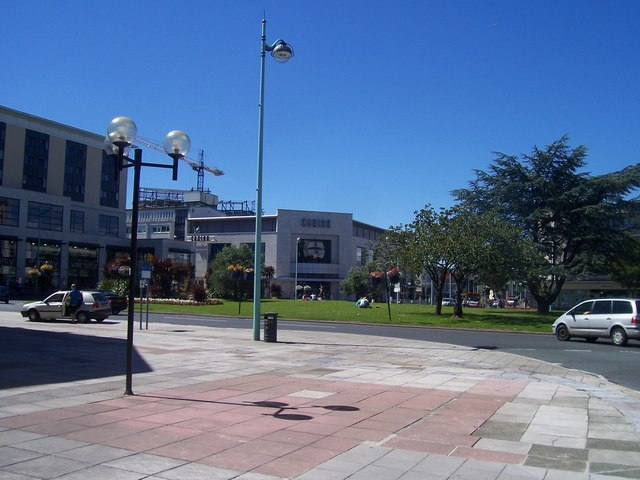
Varsity in Plymouth

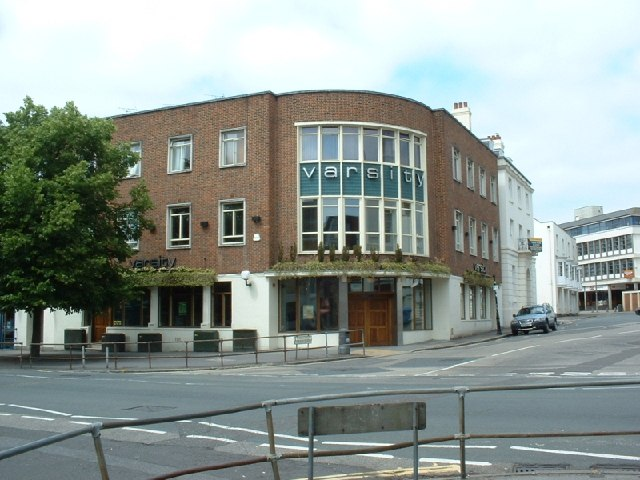
Varsity in Southampton

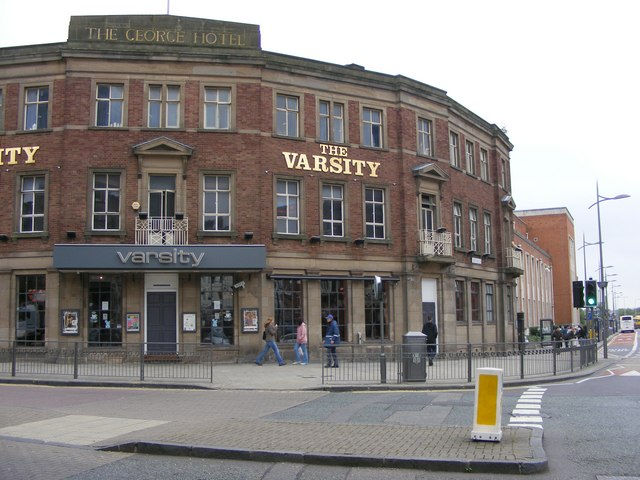
The first Varsity in Wolverhampton
