= Scream Pubs =

British pub chain

Scream
- Industry: Hospitality industry
- Genre: Pub chain
- Founded: 1995
- Founder: Bass
- Headquarters: Birmingham
- Area served: UK
- Products: Student-themed pubs
- Owner: Defunct, previously Stonegate Pub Company
- Website: Scream Pubs

Scream (formerly known as It's A Scream) was a student-oriented pub chain in the United Kingdom owned by the Stonegate Pub Company. The chain began in October 1995.

== History ==
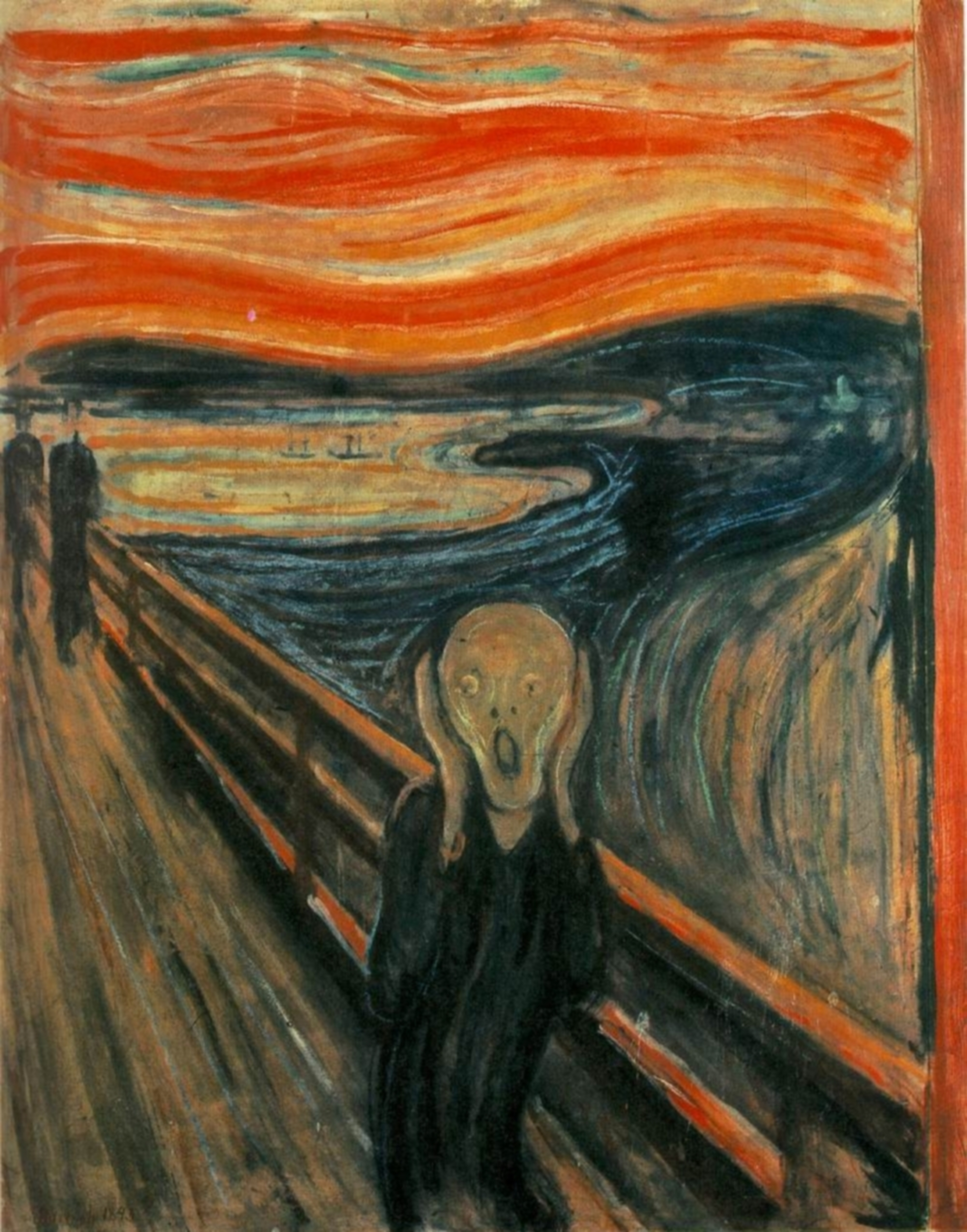
The Scream by Edvard Munch

The pub chain was set up by brewers Bass, who called it, It's a Scream. The pubs were all within relatively short walking distance of a university.

Bass's retail arm became Mitchells & Butlers in April 2003.

Scream was disposed of by Mitchells and Butlers on 20 August 2010, along with around 300 other Mitchells and Butlers pubs for £373M to Stonegate (owned by TDR Capital).

== Theme ==
Scream pubs were aimed at the student market, and mostly found near to universities. They claimed to be 'the number one choice of students'. Its chief competitor was Varsity, owned at the time by the Barracuda Group, although Varsity had a more mainstream market – often concentrating on football matches on Sky Sports and located closer to town centres. Varsity became part of Stonegate in 2013.

The original name came from the 1893 painting The Scream, by the Norwegian artist Edvard Munch, which is a popular poster image with many students. The painting was formerly shown on some pub signs of the former It's A Scream chain.

The pubs each had individual items, for example a giant monkey mural (Horn in Hand), a talking moose's head (White Harte, Bristol), an aardvark costume (The Aardvark, Coventry) or a large painting of a Phoenix (The Phoenix, Coventry) and their own sign relating to their name. Some went further, such as the Dry Dock in Leeds and Leicester which were built inside an old grounded ship.

Scream pubs had a loyalty card scheme known as The Yellow Card. It was available to students annually for £1 (originally free) and entitled them to discounts on selected food and drink. In November 2006, selected Scream Pubs had been chosen to run a trial wherein they did not sell Yellow Cards.

With the introduction of the new Scottish Licensing Laws on 1 September 2009, Yellow Cards purchased in Scream pubs in Scotland would not be valid until 72 hours after purchase.

In the Summer of 2003, Scream introduced the "Yellow Card For Life" – costing £5, with the promise that it will never expire.

=== Former locations ===
There were 50 Scream pubs spread around the UK when Stonegate took over the chain, with the vast majority being in towns and cities with a significant student population.

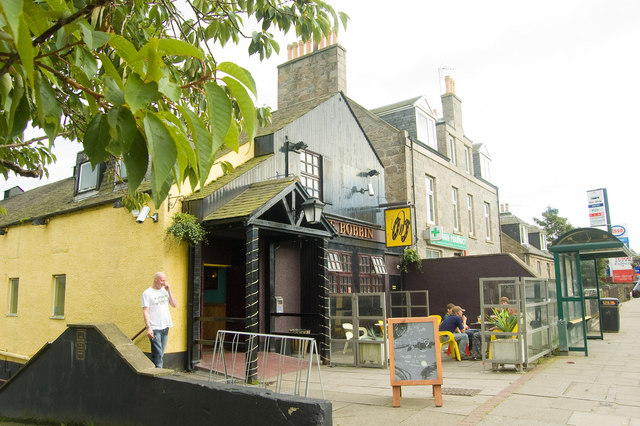
The Bobbin in Aberdeen

Scotland

- Aberdeen (2)

The Bobbin
Triplekirks

- Dundee (1)

The Nether Inn

- Edinburgh (1)

The Tron

- Glasgow (3)

The Ark
The Hall
Curlers

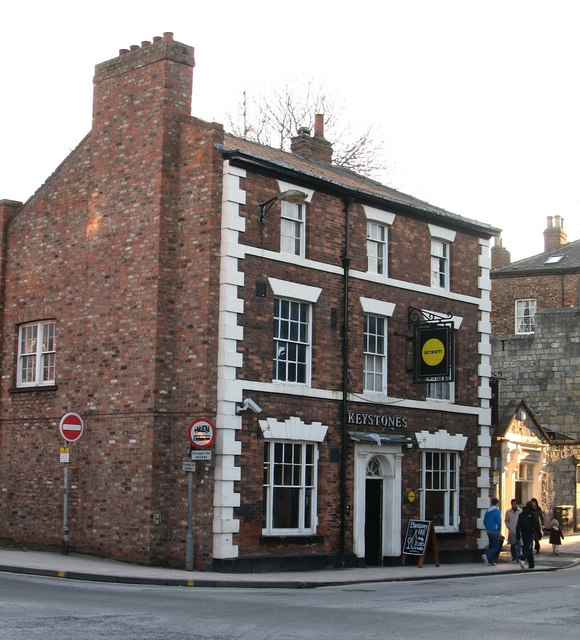
The Keystones at Monk Bar in York

North-East

- Middlesbrough (3)

The Southfield
The Camel's Hump
The Crown

- Durham (1)

The New Inn

- Newcastle-upon-Tyne (1)

The Hancock

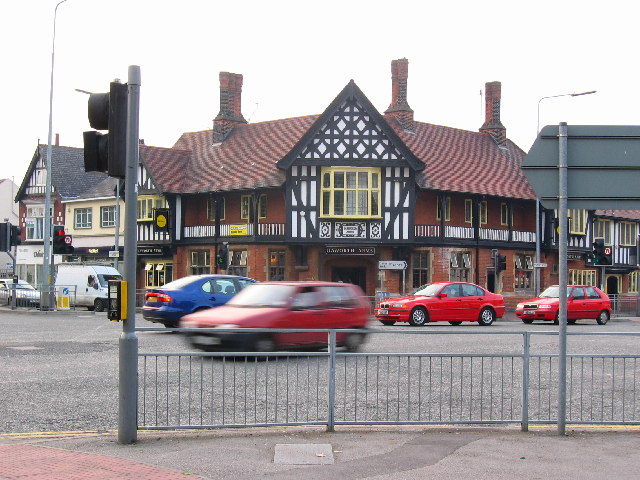
Haworth Arms on Beverley Road near the University of Hull

Yorkshire

- Huddersfield (1)

The Warehouse
The Parish Pump
The Ship

- Hull (2)

Piper Club
The Haworth Arms

- Leeds (2)

The Dry Dock
The Library

- Sheffield (3)

The Cavendish
The Globe
The York

- York (1)

The Keystones

- Bradford (1)

Delius

- Grimsby (1)

The Wheatsheaf

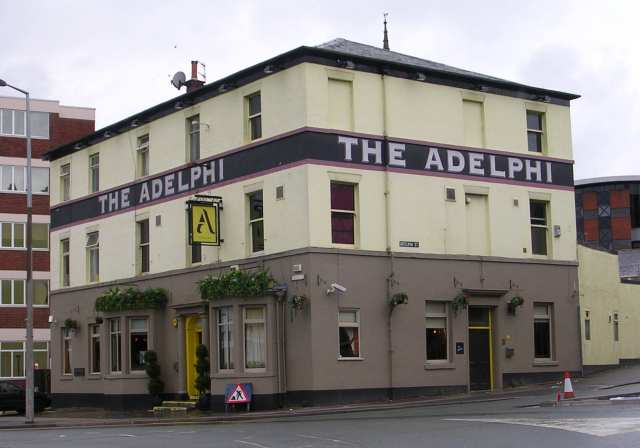
The Adelphi near the University of Central Lancashire in Preston

North-West

- Lancaster (2)

Keystones
The Friary

- Liverpool (2)

The Brookhouse
The Hope and Anchor

- Manchester (2)

The Footage
The Pub/Zoo

- Preston (2)

Roper Hall
The Adelphi

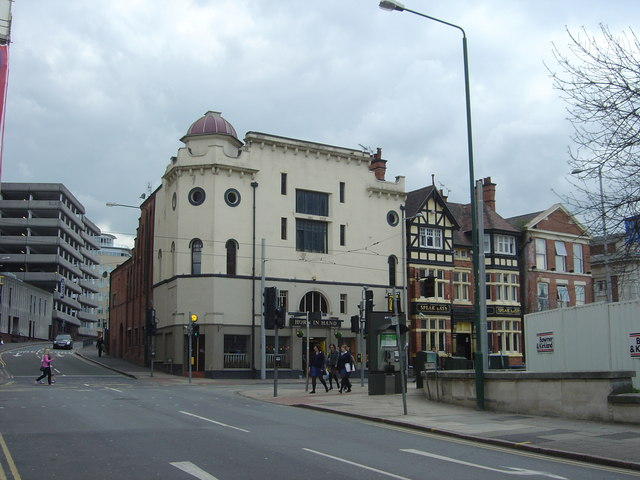
Horn in Hand (former site of Nottingham Playhouse before 1963) near Nottingham Trent University

East Midlands

- Derby (1)

The Friary

- Leicester (4)

POLAR BEAR
The Dry Dock
The Loaded Dog
Soar Point

- Loughborough (1)

The Phantom

- Northampton (1)

The Penny Whistle

- Nottingham (1)

The Horn in Hand

The Royal London near the University of Wolverhampton

West Midlands

- Birmingham (3)

The Bristol Pear
The Gosta Green
The Hare of the Dog

- Coventry (2)

The Aardvark
The Phoenix

- Leamington Spa (1)

Robbins Well

- Wolverhampton (1)

The Royal London

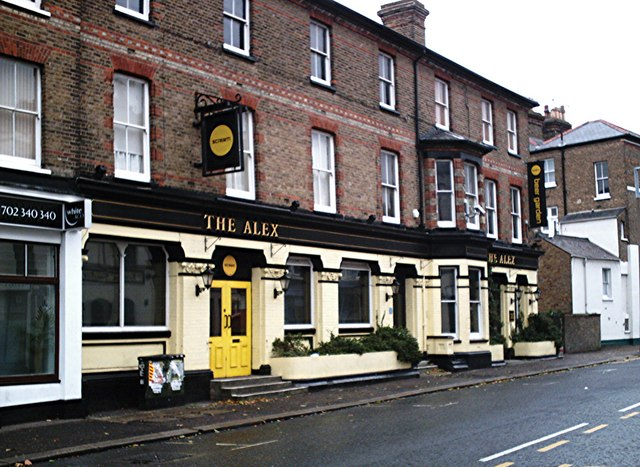
The Alex in Southend on Sea

East of England

- Southend-on-Sea (1)

The Alex

- London (1)

The Auctioneer

South-East

- Canterbury (1)

The Penny Theatre

- Oxford (3)

The City Arms
The Jericho
The Pub, Oxford

- Reading (2)

Pavlovs Dog
Upin Arms

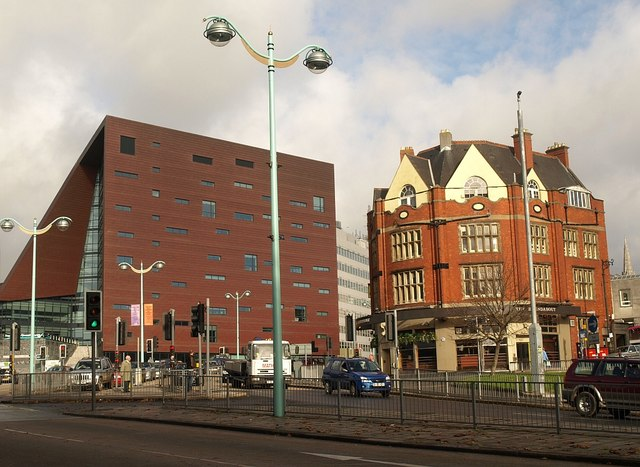
The Roundabout at Drakes Circus, Plymouth

- Southampton (1)

The Avondale

South-West

- Bristol (2)

The Cider Press (previously The Rising Sun)
The White Harte

- Bournemouth (1)

The Inferno

- Cheltenham (1)

The Pulpit

- Plymouth (1)

The Roundabout

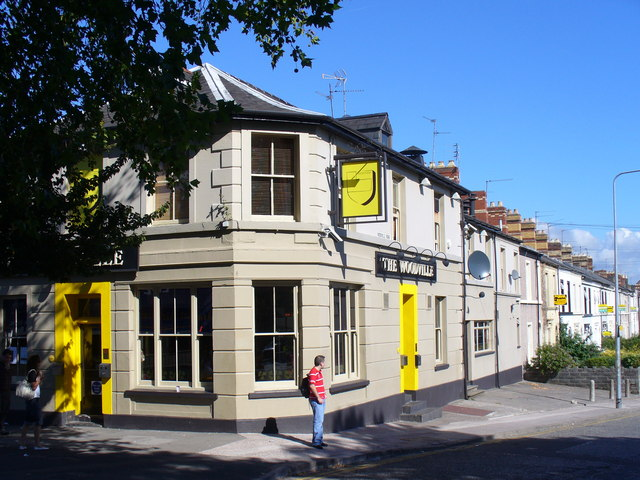
The Woodville in Cardiff

Wales

- Bangor (1)

The Old Glan

- Cardiff (2)

The George
The Woodville
Gassy Jacks

- Treforest (1)

The Knott Inn

== Closures ==
One of the first Scream bars to close was The India Arms in Portsmouth during the early 2000s, and the pub was subsequently sold to Enterprise Inns. It now trades as Carter & Co.

Another Scream bar in Portsmouth, The Registry, closed at the end of March 2010. It was renamed The Kraken Wakes as part of an ongoing partnership between independent pub operator Fiveeightzero and the owner, Mitchells & Butlers. It opened at the end of April 2010 following a refurbishment. The new name was short lived, as the establishment reverted to the original name of The Registry in March 2011. It was sold to REL Leisure in August 2013, and then closed once again on 31 May 2014. REL Leisure subsequently applied to convert the building into student accommodation.

The Queen of Hearts in Fallowfield, Manchester, was sold to Hydes Pub Company in April 2011, Hydes then sold the pub on in 2015, when it became 256 Wilmslow Road. The Cheshire Cat which adjoined The Queen of Hearts was also acquired in April 2011 by Hydes, modernised and renamed the Joseph Whitworth, then a further rebranding took place in early 2015 when it became Beer Studio. In September 2019 with yet more rebranding it became Studio Bar.

Robinskis in Fallowfield was taken over by Stonegate Pub Company in late 2010. The pub was sold on to an independent owner on 6 May 2011, and reopened as Nayaab Indian Restaurant.

Scream had 67 pubs under its name at the time of sale. Stonegate bought 62 of these pubs. The other five stayed under Michells and Butlers until they were sold on to other buyers. Since Stonegate have taken over, the following 14 pubs have been sold by Stonegate:

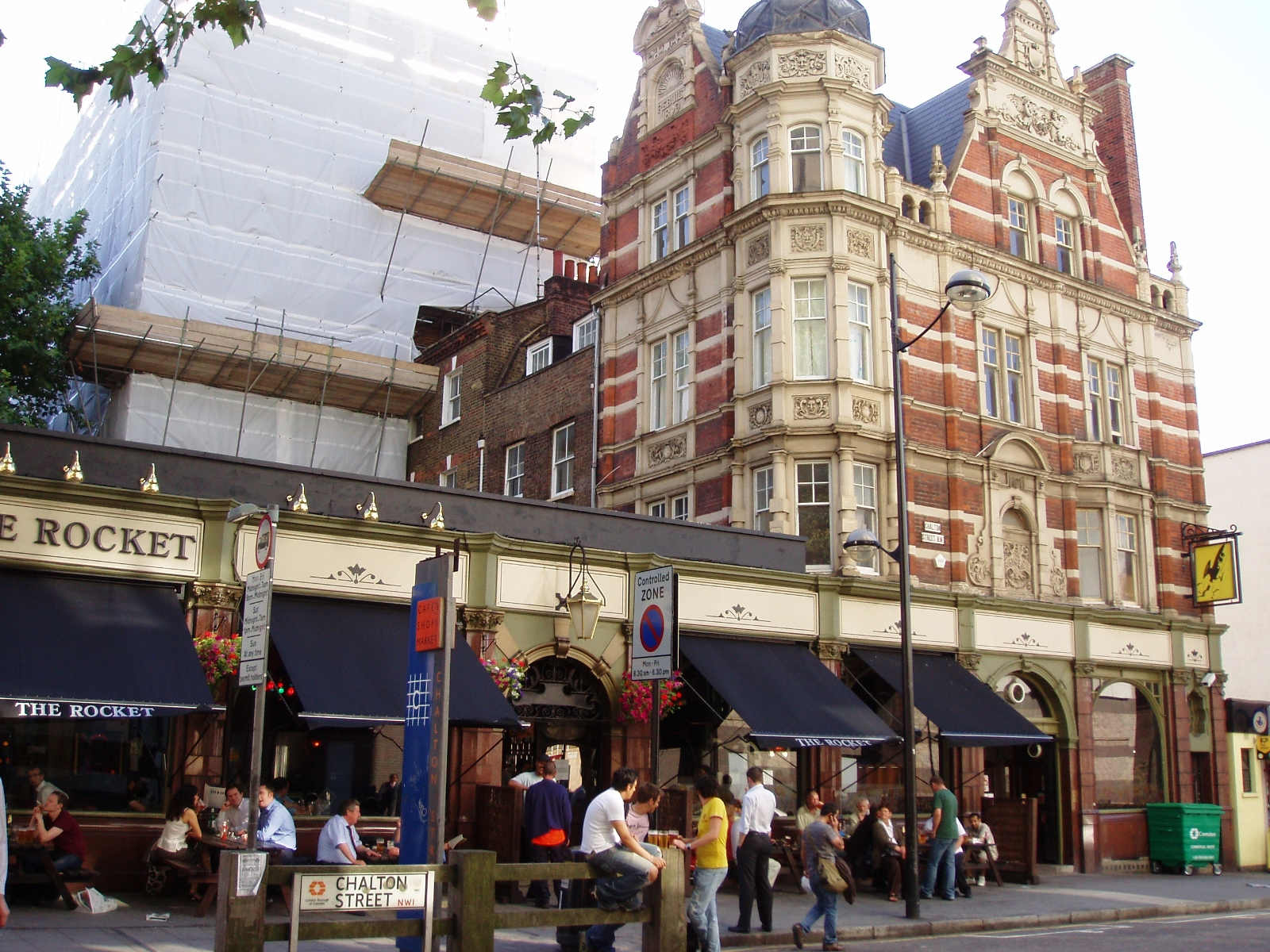
The Rocket in Euston

- The Junction in Harrow
- The Kinston Mill in Kingston upon Thames
- The Robbins Well in Leamington Spa
- The Quayside in Lincoln
- The Park in Luton
- Robinskis in Manchester
- The Phoenix in Manchester
- The Queen of Hearts and The Cheshire Cat in Manchester
- The Lot in Richmond

== Common Room ==
Starting with the Southfield, Stonegate began converting existing Scream sites to a new 'Common Room' brand, rather than branding each site as a uniform segment, instead brands each site individually. The sites focus more on casual dining and an emerging interest in craft beer. Typically sites having converted to the new brand saw an increase in sales of roughly 60%, with success based on a change to multiple visits by customers during the day.
