= Grosvenor Picture Palace =

Listed former cinema in Manchester, England

The Grosvenor
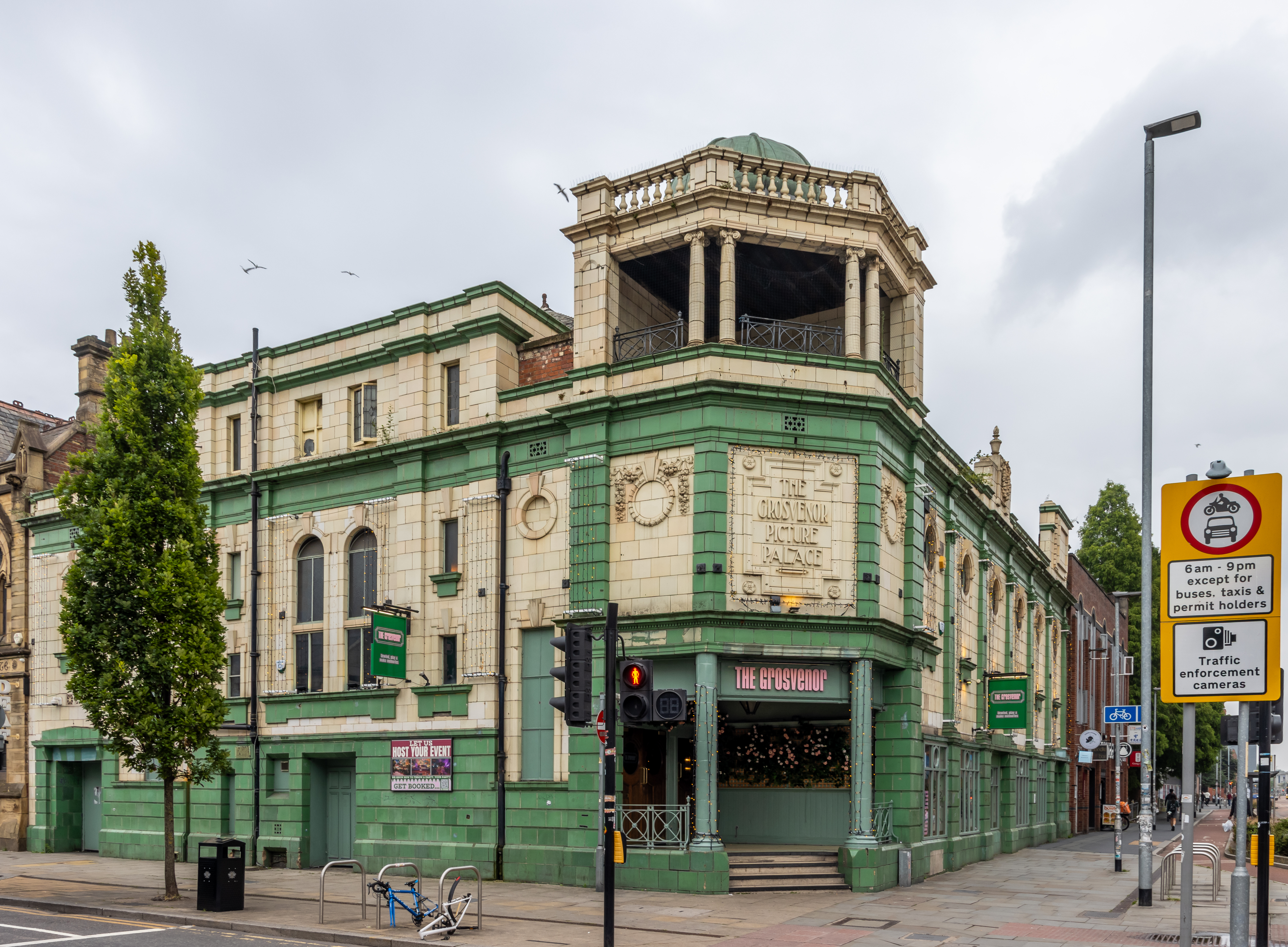
- The building in 2025
- Former names: Grosvenor Picture Palace; Riley's Snooker Club; Flea and Firkin; Footage and Firkin; The Footage

General information
- Type: Public house; originally a cinema
- Location: 137 Grosvenor Street, Manchester, England
- Coordinates: 53.4701°N 2.2367°W
- Year built: 1912; 114 years ago

Design and construction
- Architect: Percy Hothersall
- Designations

Listed Building – Grade II
- Official name: Former Grosvenor Picture Palace
- Designated: 3 October 1974
- Reference no.: 1218431

Website
- grosvenormanchester.co.uk

The Grosvenor Picture Palace, later known as The Grosvenor, is a Grade II listed former cinema at the corner of Grosvenor Street and Oxford Road in Chorlton-on-Medlock, Manchester, England. Built in 1912, it was the largest cinema outside London in its day. After closing in 1968, the building was used as a bingo hall, a snooker club, and has been a public house since 1990 under various names.

== History ==
The building was constructed in 1912, according to its official listing, (Note: Another source gives a construction date of 1913–1915.) while anecdotal sources attribute its design to 1913. Percy Hothersall is named as the architect (he later designed Manchester's first supercinema, The Piccadilly, off Piccadilly Gardens, built in 1919–1922). The Grosvenor Picture Palace stands at the corner of Grosvenor Street and Oxford Road in Chorlton-on-Medlock.

The cinema opened on 19 May 1915, featuring Blanche Forsythe in Jane Shore; it was described at the time as "Roman-Corinthian of the later Renaissance influence". It dates from the period when the first permanent cinemas were being built, with the distinctive design acting as "ostentatious advertising". The cinema had a capacity of just under 1,000 people, making it the largest cinema outside London in its day. A billiard hall was installed in the basement in the 1930s.

It was operated by the H.D. Moorehouse chain, before being acquired by Star Cinema Group in the early 1960s, who used the building both for cinema and bingo. It showed features such as Steve Reeves in Hercules Unchained. It was never a commercial success due to its distance from Manchester's city centre. The last films shown were The Passionate Demons and Attack of the Crab Monsters on 18 May 1968, after which the building was used exclusively for bingo. It was later used as a Riley's Snooker Club for a number of years; it was subsequently boarded up for several years.

On 3 October 1974, the former Grosvenor Picture Palace was designated a Grade II listed building.

In 1990 the building became a Firkin Brewery pub called the Flea and Firkin, described in the Rough Guide as a "predominantly student-filled beer-hall-style pub with brewery on site." The public house was renamed the Footage and Firkin before the site was sold and became a Scream pub called The Footage. It was refurbished by owners Stonegate Pub Company at a cost of £360,000, and was relaunched on 13 September 2014 with a capacity of 620 people. Following closure in May 2024, the building underwent refurbishment by new owners Index Investments and reopened as The Grosvenor in November the same year.

== Architecture ==
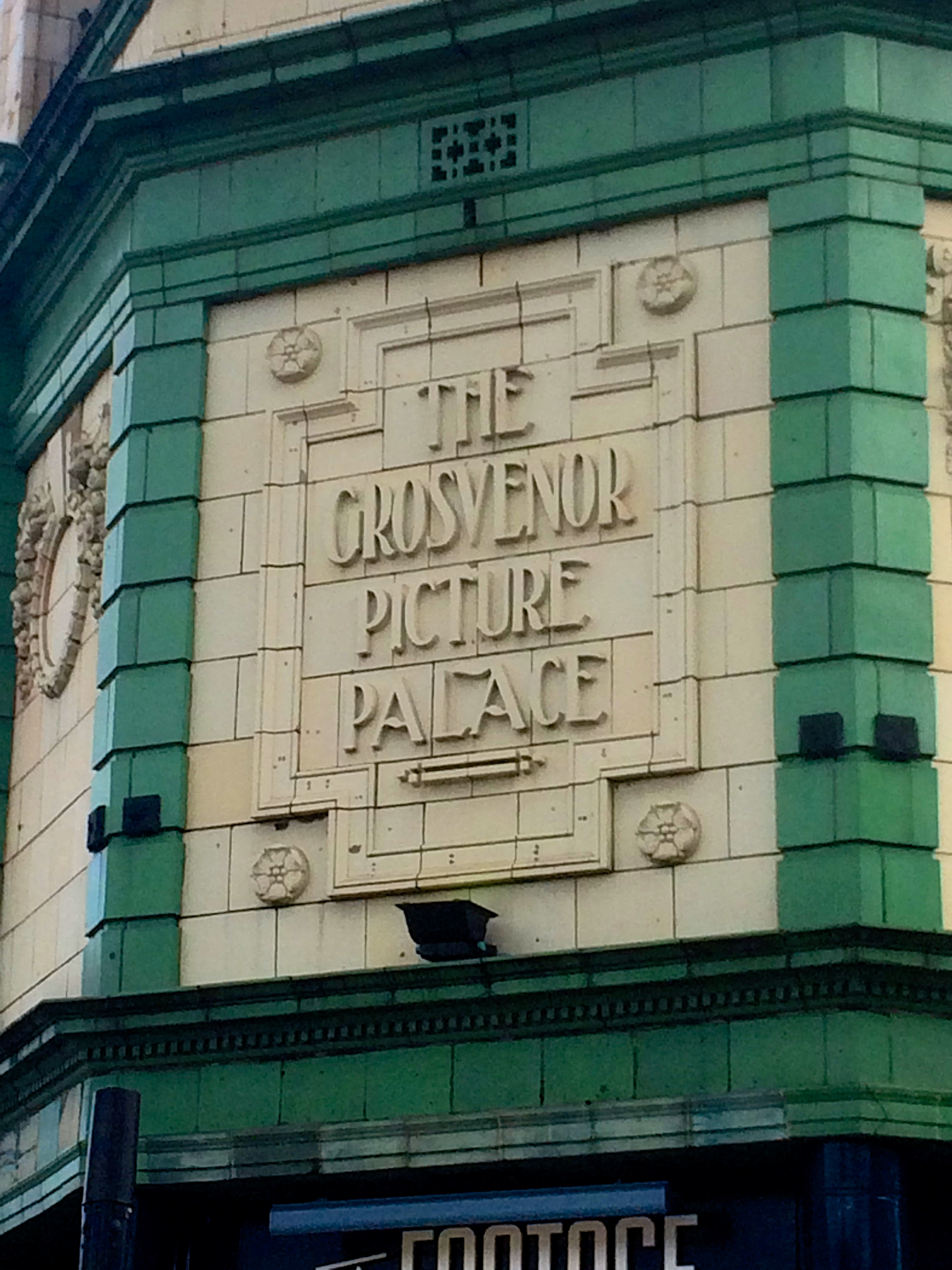
"The Grosvenor Picture Palace" sign above the entrance

The two-storey building is rectangular, and is on a corner site with a 3-bay chamfered entrance corner with a pavilion on top. Its facade features green and cream faience and terracotta tiles, and it has four bays facing Grosvenor Street and six bays facing Oxford Road. The centre of the Oxford Road facade is marked with a raised torch in white terracotta. It has a small attic and a slate roof. It originally had a canopy, which was later removed.

Much of the original interior, including plasterwork, the balcony and the vaulted ceiling, is still present in the building. The inside balcony originally had multi-coloured inlaid panels.

== See also ==
- Listed buildings in Manchester-M1
- Listed pubs in Greater Manchester
