= SS America (1914) =

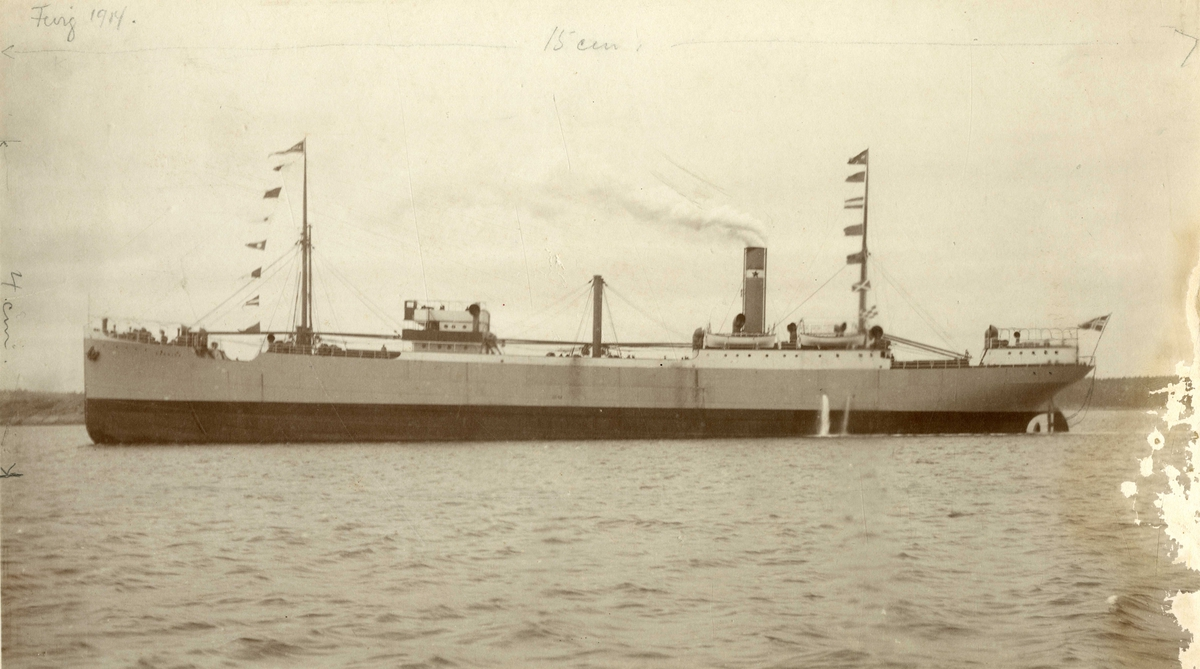

History

Norway
- Name: America
- Owner: A/S Norge Mexico Gulf Linjen
- Operator: A/S Norge Mexico Gulf Linjen
- Builder: Sørlandets Skibsbyggeri, Fevig
- Cost: NOK 1,297,000.57
- Yard number: 169
- Launched: 3 September 1914
- Christened: America
- Commissioned: October 1914
- Home port: Tønsberg
- Identification: Call sign MKPW
- Fate: Sunk, 2 May 1915

General characteristics
- Type: Cargo ship
- Tonnage: 3,706 GRT; 2,305 NRT; 5,800 DWT
- Length: 357 ft 5 in (108.94 m)
- Beam: 48 ft 0 in (14.63 m)
- Depth: 27 ft 2 in (8.28 m)
- Installed power: 310 Nhp
- Propulsion: North Eastern Marine Engineering Co. 3-cylinder triple expansion
- Speed: 11.0 knots

America was a steam cargo ship built in 1914 by the Sørlandets Skibsbyggeri of Fevig for the Norge Mexico Gulf Linjen. She was ordered by the line before being acquired by Wilhelm Wilhelmsen.

== Design and construction ==
In 1913, an English firm Fearnley, Eger, and Wilhelm Wilhelmsen established the "Norwegian Africa and Australia Line" called NAAL. At about the same time, the two companies also took over the "Norge Mexico Gulf Linjen" (NMGL), involved in oil and oil products transportation to South America. NMGL ordered a new ship in 1913 before the acquisition, and America was completed for Wilhelm Wilhelmson for NOK 1,297,000.57 the next year. The ship was laid down in 1913 at Sørlandets Skibsbyggeri shipyard in Fevig, launched on 3 September 1914 (yard number 169) and commissioned in October of the same year. As built, the ship was 357 feet 5 inches (108.94 m) long (between perpendiculars) and 48 feet 0 inches (14.63 m) abeam, a mean draft of 27 feet 2 inches (8.28 m). America was assessed at 3,706 GRT, 2,305 NRT, and 5,800 DWT. The vessel had a steel hull, and a single 310 nhp triple-expansion steam engine, with cylinders of 25-inch (64 cm), 41-inch (100 cm), and 68-inch (170 cm) diameter with a 45-inch (110 cm) stroke, that drove a single screw propeller, and moved the ship at up to 11.0 knots (12.7 mph; 20.4 km/h).

== Operational history ==
After completion, America was put on the Norway-USA route connecting the East Coast ports of Boston and Philadelphia with Bergen and Kristiania.

The vessel loaded up cargo, which included, among other things, granite, at Stavanger and then Bergen and departed for her maiden voyage on November 3, 1914, for Havana via Boston and other ports. The ship arrived at Boston on November 21 and departed the next day for Philadelphia, where she arrived two days later. From Philadelphia, America continued on her journey, calling at Newport News on November 28 before proceeding to Havana the next day. America arrived in Havana on December 4, unloaded her cargo, and departed Cuba on December 11 for Galveston, which she reached two days later. After taking on cargo, the ship departed for Kristiania via Gulf ports and Newport News and arrived at her destination on January 29, 1915.

America departed for her next and final voyage from Kristiania to Boston on February 25, 1915. She carried about 7,000 bales of cellulose, 1,400 bales of tree pulp, 1,800 boxes of canned goods and was not fully loaded. The ship arrived at Boston on March 13, and after unloading, left Boston on March 19 for Philadelphia, arriving there three days later.

=== Sinking ===
America departed from Philadelphia on 28 March 1915 for her final voyage to Bergen with approximately 5,000 tons of general cargo. She had to stop at Kirkwall for inspection by the British authorities and spent 4 days there, departing on 16 April 1915 to Sunderland. Upon arrival there the next day, she had to unload part of her cargo, including oil, leather, and food supplies deemed to be contraband by the British. She left Sunderland on 1 May 1915 with only 1,500 tons of cargo. Shortly after 22:00 on May 1, about 135 nautical miles (250 km) east-northeast of the Longstone Lighthouse, the ship was struck on the port side in her engine room by a torpedo. The vessel quickly filled up with water, forcing her Captain Johan Endresen to order the crew to abandon ship. Three lifeboats were lowered and all 37 crew left the ship. America sank stern first at about 00:50 on May 2 in an approximate position 57°23′N 1°10′E. The torpedo was launched by the German submarine U-41.
