= Battle of Eski Hissarlik =

The Battle of Eski Hissarlik took place on 1 May 1915 and was an attempt made by the Ottomans, commanded by Liman von Sanders to push Allied (British and French) troops back to the sea.

== Prelude ==
On 28 April 1915, Allied troops had attempted to capture the village of Krithia on the Gallipoli peninsula. They were unsuccessful and withdrew from the First Battle of Krithia after 10 hours. On 1 May 1915, Ottoman troops made a counter-strike designed to force the Allied troops back to the sea.

== Battle ==
At around 10:15 PM on 1 May 1915, Ottoman troops, commanded by Liman von Sanders, attacked the Allied troops' defenses close to the hill of Achi Baba. The British and French had been prepared for a night attack and inflicted heavy injuries upon the Ottoman forces. The British received far fewer casualties, and remained on the island.

== Aftermath ==
If the Allied forces had been pushed back to the sea, the Gallipoli campaign would have been over. Instead, they remained on the peninsula. 5 days later they would again attack the village of Krithia, in the Second Battle of Krithia.
