= List of state leaders in the 2020s =

- Lists of state leaders by century: List of state leaders in the 20th century (1951–2000); List of state leaders in the 2000s; List of state leaders in the 2010s; List of current heads of state and government

This is a list of state leaders in the 2020s (2020 to today), such as the heads of state, heads of government, or the general secretaries of single-party states.

These polities are generally sovereign states, including states with limited recognition (when recognised by at least one UN member state), but excludes minor dependent territories, whose leaders can be found listed under territorial governors in the 21st century. For completeness, these lists can include colonies, protectorates, or other dependent territories that have since gained sovereignty.

== Africa ==
=== Africa: Central ===
- Angola

- Presidents (complete list) –

- João Lourenço, president (since 26 September 2017)

- Cameroon

- Presidents (complete list) –

- Paul Biya, president (since 6 November 1982)

- Prime ministers (complete list) –

- Joseph Ngute, prime minister (since 4 January 2019)

- Central African Republic

- Presidents (complete list) –

- Faustin-Archange Touadéra, president (since 30 March 2016)

- Prime ministers (complete list) –

- Firmin Ngrébada, prime minister (25 February 2019 – 15 June 2021)
- Henri-Marie Dondra, prime minister (15 June 2021 – 7 February 2022)
- Félix Moloua, prime minister (since 7 February 2022)

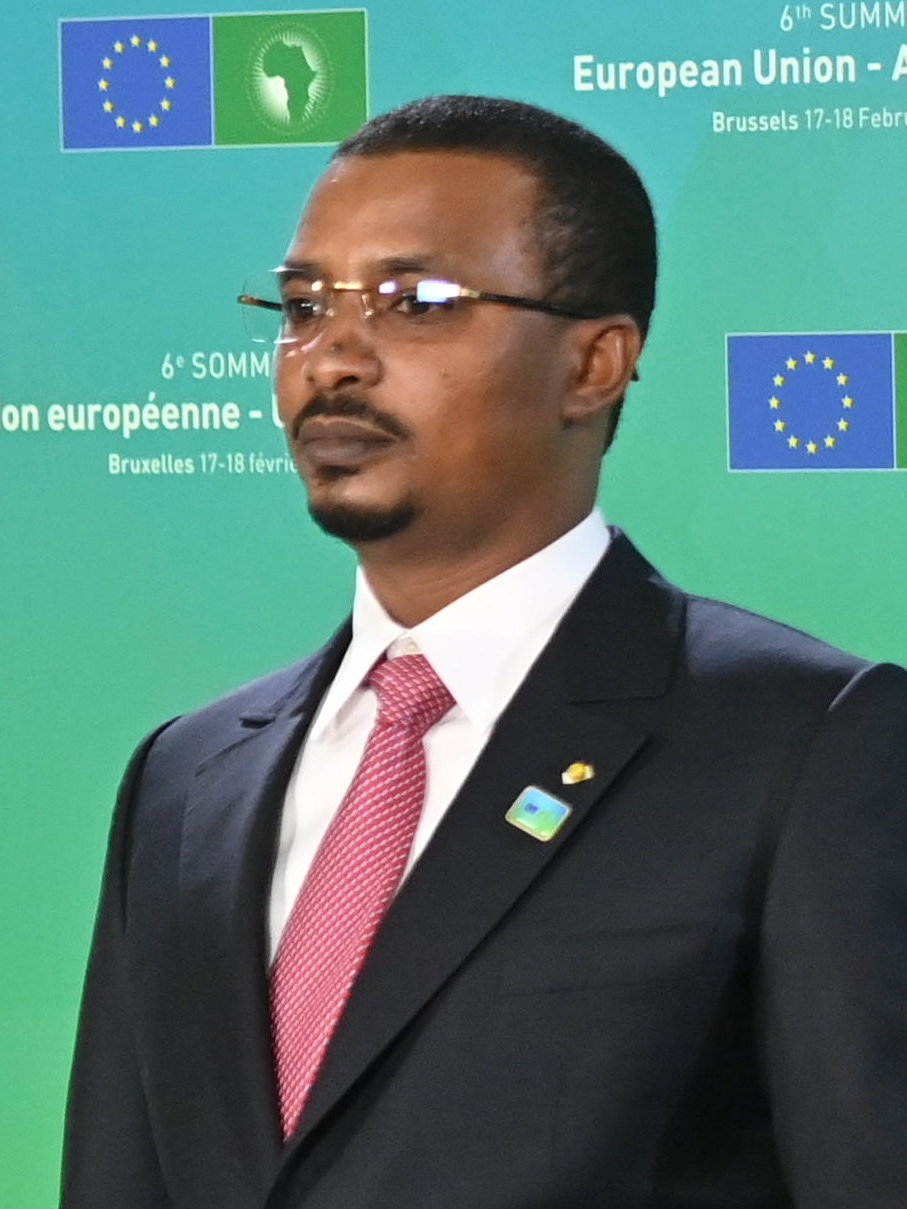
Mahamat Déby in 2022

- Chad

- Heads of state (complete list) –

- Idriss Déby, president (28 February 1991 – 20 April 2021)
- Mahamat Déby, president of the Transitional Military Council (20 April 2021 – 10 October 2022); transitional president (10 October 2022 – 23 May 2024); president (since 23 May 2024)

- Prime ministers (complete list) –

- Albert Pahimi Padacké, prime minister (26 April 2021 – 12 October 2022)
- Saleh Kebzabo, prime minister (12 October 2022 – 1 January 2024)
- Succès Masra, prime minister (1 January 2024 – 22 May 2024)
- Allamaye Halina, prime minister (since 23 May 2024)

- Democratic Republic of the Congo

- Presidents (complete list) –

- Félix Tshisekedi, president (since 24 January 2019)

- Prime ministers (complete list) –

- Sylvestre Ilunga, prime minister (7 September 2019 – 26 April 2021)
- Sama Lukonde, prime minister (26 April 2021 – 12 June 2024)
- Judith Suminwa, prime minister (since 12 June 2024)

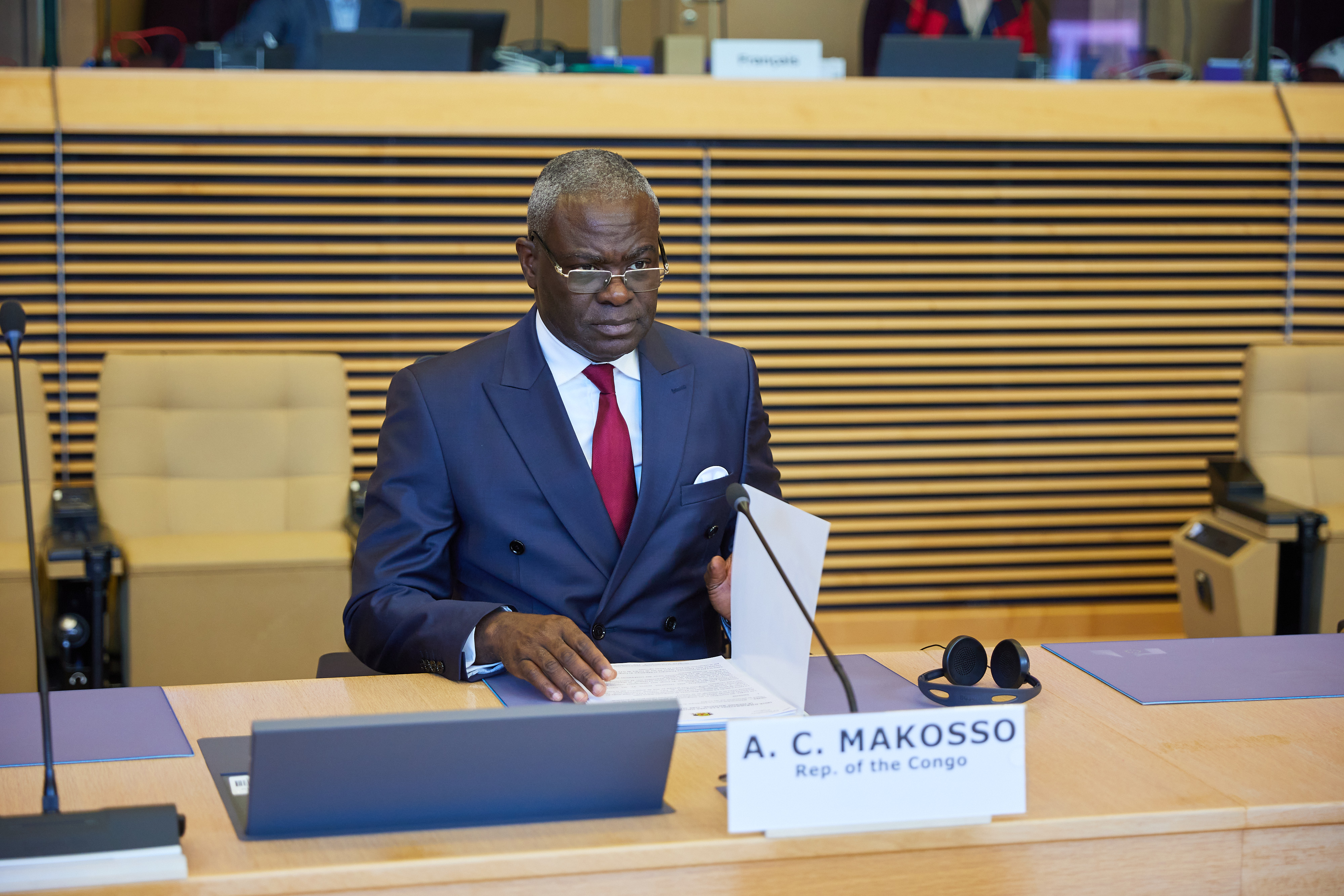
Anatole Collinet Makosso in 2022

- Republic of the Congo

- Presidents (complete list) –

- Denis Sassou Nguesso, president (8 February 1979 – 31 August 1992, since 25 October 1997)

- Prime ministers (complete list) –

- Clément Mouamba, prime minister (23 April 2016 – 12 May 2021)
- Anatole Collinet Makosso, prime minister (since 12 May 2021)

- Equatorial Guinea

- Presidents (complete list) –

- Teodoro Obiang Nguema Mbasogo, president (since 12 October 1982)

- Prime ministers (complete list) –

- Francisco Pascual Obama Asue, prime minister (23 June 2016 – 1 February 2023)
- Manuela Roka Botey, prime minister (1 February 2023 – 17 August 2024)
- Manuel Osa Nsue Nsua, prime minister (since 17 August 2024)

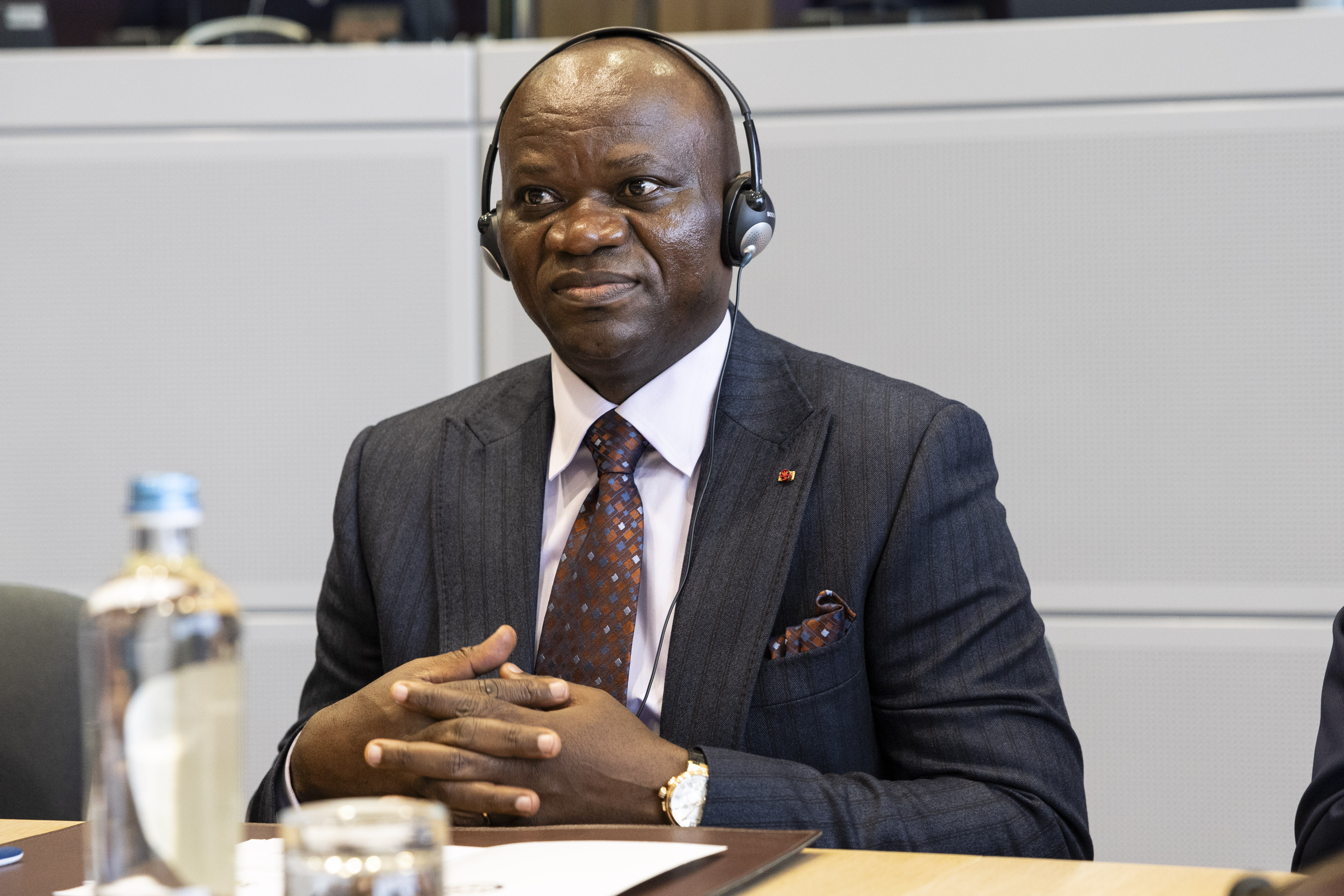
Brice Oligui Nguema in 2024

- Gabon

- Presidents (complete list) –

- Ali Bongo, president (16 October 2009 – 30 August 2023)
- Brice Oligui Nguema, transitional president (30 August 2023 – 3 May 2025); president (since 3 May 2025)

- Prime ministers (complete list) –

- Julien Nkoghe Bekale, prime minister (12 January 2019 – 16 July 2020)
- Rose Christiane Raponda, prime minister (16 July 2020 – 9 January 2023)
- Alain Claude Bilie By Nze, prime minister (9 January 2023 – 30 August 2023)
- Raymond Ndong Sima, transitional prime minister (7 September 2023 – 4 May 2025)

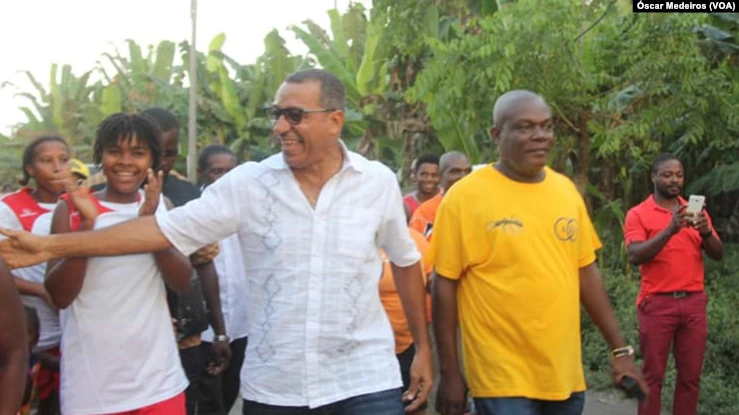
Carlos Vila Nova in 2021

- São Tomé and Príncipe

- Presidents (complete list) –

- Evaristo Carvalho, president (3 September 2016 – 2 October 2021)
- Carlos Vila Nova, president (since 2 October 2021)

- Prime ministers (complete list) –

- Jorge Bom Jesus, prime minister (3 December 2018 – 10 November 2022)
- Patrice Trovoada, prime minister (11 November 2022 – 6 January 2025)
- Ilza Amado Vaz, prime minister (9 January 2025 – 12 January 2025)
- Américo Ramos, prime minister (since 12 January 2025)

=== Africa: East ===
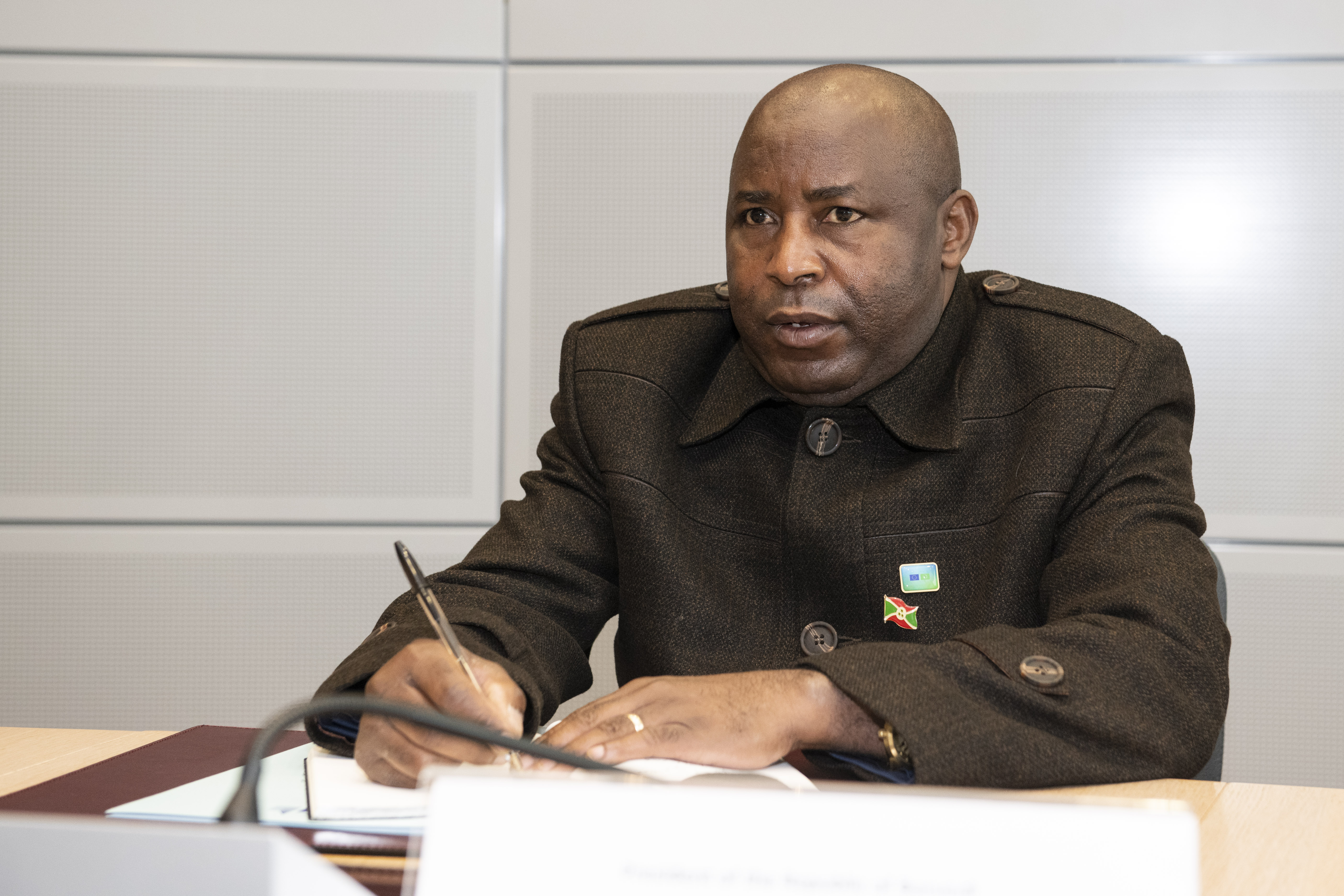
Évariste Ndayishimiye in 2022

- Burundi

- Presidents (complete list) –

- Pierre Nkurunziza, president (26 August 2005 – 8 June 2020)
- Évariste Ndayishimiye, president (since 18 June 2020)

- Prime ministers (complete list) –

- Alain-Guillaume Bunyoni, prime minister (23 June 2020 – 7 September 2022)
- Gervais Ndirakobuca, prime minister (7 September 2022 – 5 August 2025)
- Nestor Ntahontuye, prime minister (since 5 August 2025)

- Comoros

- Presidents (complete list) –

- Azali Assoumani, president (since 3 April 2019)

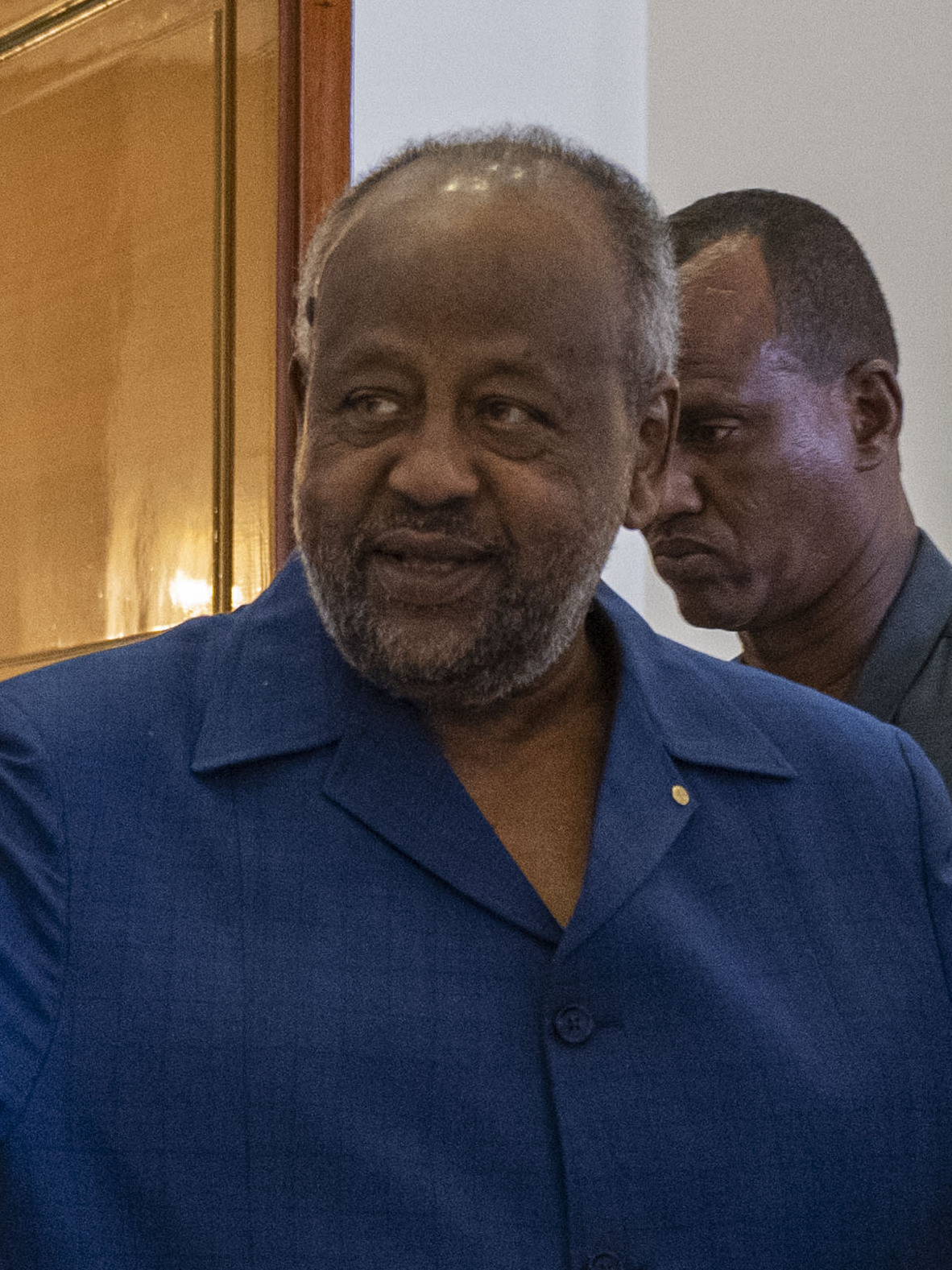
Ismaïl Omar Guelleh in 2023

- Djibouti

- Presidents (complete list) –

- Ismaïl Omar Guelleh, president (since 8 May 1999)

- Prime ministers (complete list) –

- Abdoulkader Kamil Mohamed, prime minister (since 1 April 2013)

- Eritrea

- Presidents (complete list) –

- Isaias Afwerki, president (since 24 May 1993)

- Ethiopia

- Presidents (complete list) –

- Sahle-Work Zewde, president (25 October 2018 – 7 October 2024)
- Taye Atske Selassie, president (since 7 October 2024)

- Prime ministers (complete list) –

- Abiy Ahmed, prime minister (since 2 April 2018)

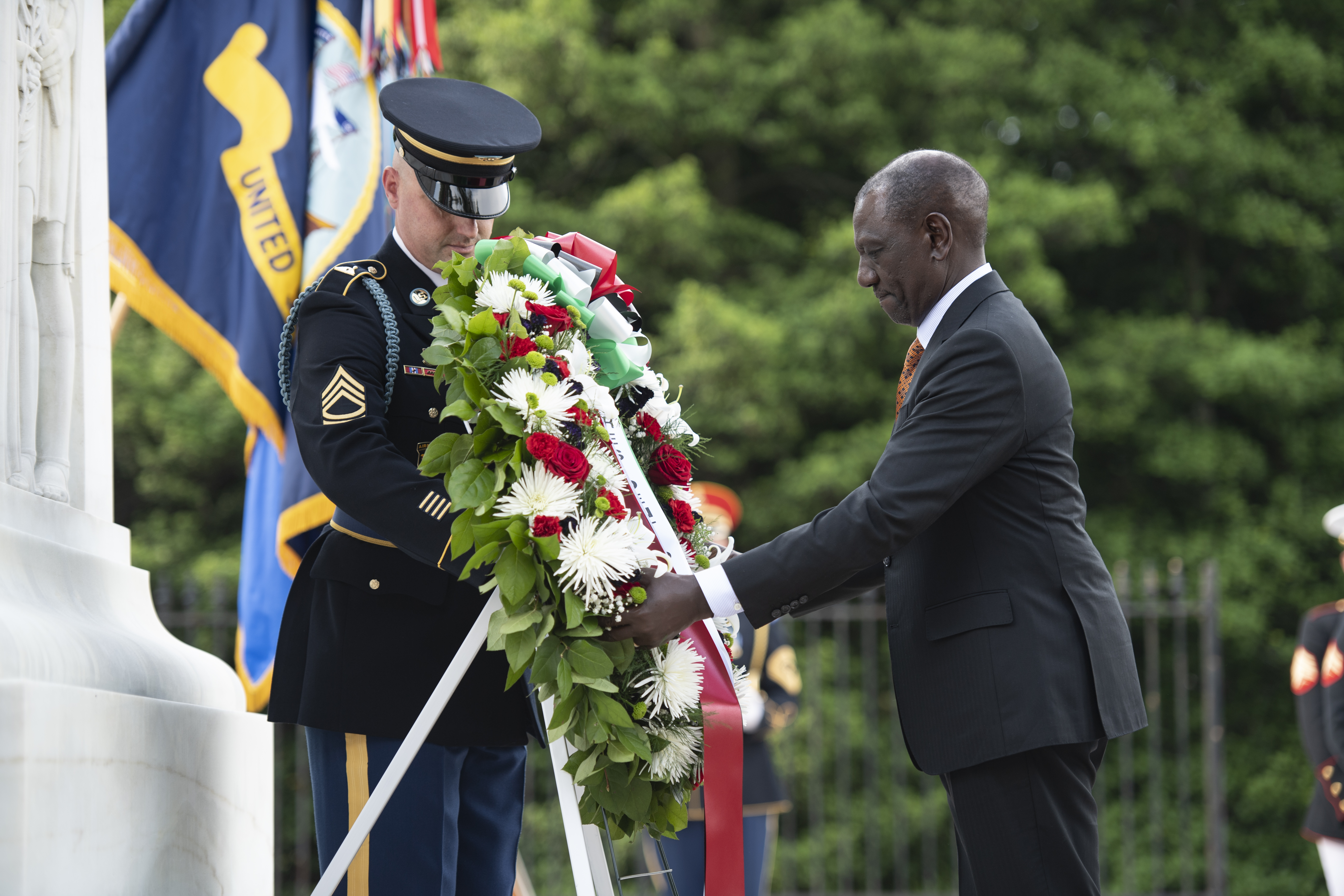
William Ruto in 2024

- Kenya

- Presidents (complete list) –

- Uhuru Kenyatta, president (9 April 2013 – 13 September 2022)
- William Ruto, president (since 13 September 2022)

- Madagascar

- Presidents (complete list) –

- Andry Rajoelina, president (19 January 2019 – 9 September 2023, 16 December 2023 – 14 October 2025)
- Christian Ntsay, acting president (9 September 2023 – 27 October 2023)
- Richard Ravalomanana, acting president (27 October 2023 – 16 December 2023)
- Andry Rajoelina, president (16 December 2023 – 14 October 2025)
- Michael Randrianirina, acting president (since 14 October 2025)

- Prime ministers (complete list) –

- Christian Ntsay, prime minister (6 June 2018 – 6 October 2025)
- Ruphin Zafisambo, prime minister (6 October 2025 – 20 October 2025)
- Herintsalama Rajaonarivelo, prime minister (20 October 2025 – 9 March 2026)
- Mamitiana Rajaonarison, prime minister (since 15 March 2026)

- Malawi

- Presidents (complete list) –

- Peter Mutharika, president (31 May 2014 – 28 June 2020)
- Lazarus Chakwera, president (28 June 2020 – 4 October 2025)
- Peter Mutharika, president (since 4 October 2025)

- Mauritius

- Presidents (complete list) –

- Prithvirajsing Roopun, president (2 December 2019 – 6 December 2024)
- Dharam Gokhool, president (since 6 December 2024)

- Prime ministers (complete list) –

- Pravind Jugnauth, prime minister (23 January 2017 – 13 November 2024)
- Navin Ramgoolam, prime minister (since 13 November 2024)

- Mozambique

- Presidents (complete list) –

- Filipe Nyusi, president (15 January 2015 – 15 January 2025)
- Daniel Chapo, president (since 15 January 2025)

- Prime ministers (complete list) –

- Carlos Agostinho do Rosário, prime minister (17 January 2015 – 3 March 2022)
- Adriano Maleiane, prime minister (3 March 2022 – 15 January 2025)
- Maria Benvinda Levy, prime minister (since 15 January 2025)

- Rwanda

- Presidents (complete list) –

- Paul Kagame, president (since 22 April 2000)

- Prime ministers (complete list) –

- Édouard Ngirente, prime minister (30 August 2017 – 25 July 2025)
- Justin Nsengiyumva, prime minister (since 25 July 2025)

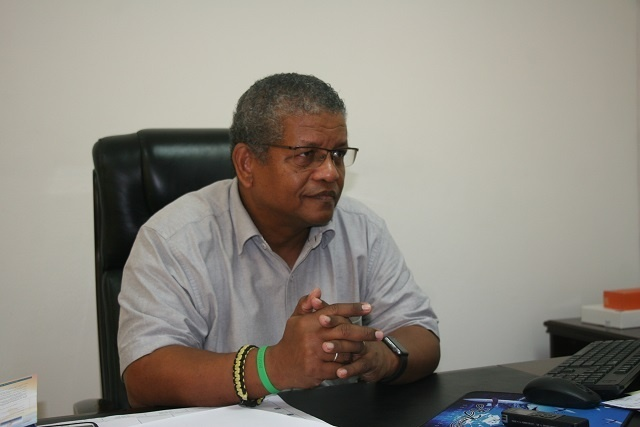
Wavel Ramkalawan in 2020

- Seychelles

- Presidents (complete list) –

- Danny Faure, president (16 October 2016 – 26 October 2020)
- Wavel Ramkalawan, president (26 October 2020 – 26 October 2025)
- Patrick Herminie, president (since 26 October 2025)

- Somalia

- Presidents (complete list) –

- Mohamed Abdullahi Mohamed, president (16 February 2017 – 23 May 2022)
- Hassan Sheikh Mohamud, president (since 23 May 2022)

- Prime ministers (complete list) –

- Hassan Ali Khaire, prime minister (1 March 2017 – 25 July 2020)
- Mahdi Mohammed Gulaid, acting prime minister (25 July 2020 – 23 September 2020)
- Mohamed Hussein Roble, prime minister (23 September 2020 – 26 June 2022)
- Hamza Abdi Barre, prime minister (since 26 June 2022)

- Somaliland

- Presidents (complete list) –

- Muse Bihi Abdi, president (13 December 2017 – 12 December 2024)
- Abdirahman Mohamed Abdullahi, president (since 12 December 2024)

- South Sudan

- Presidents (complete list) –

- Salva Kiir, president (since 9 July 2011)

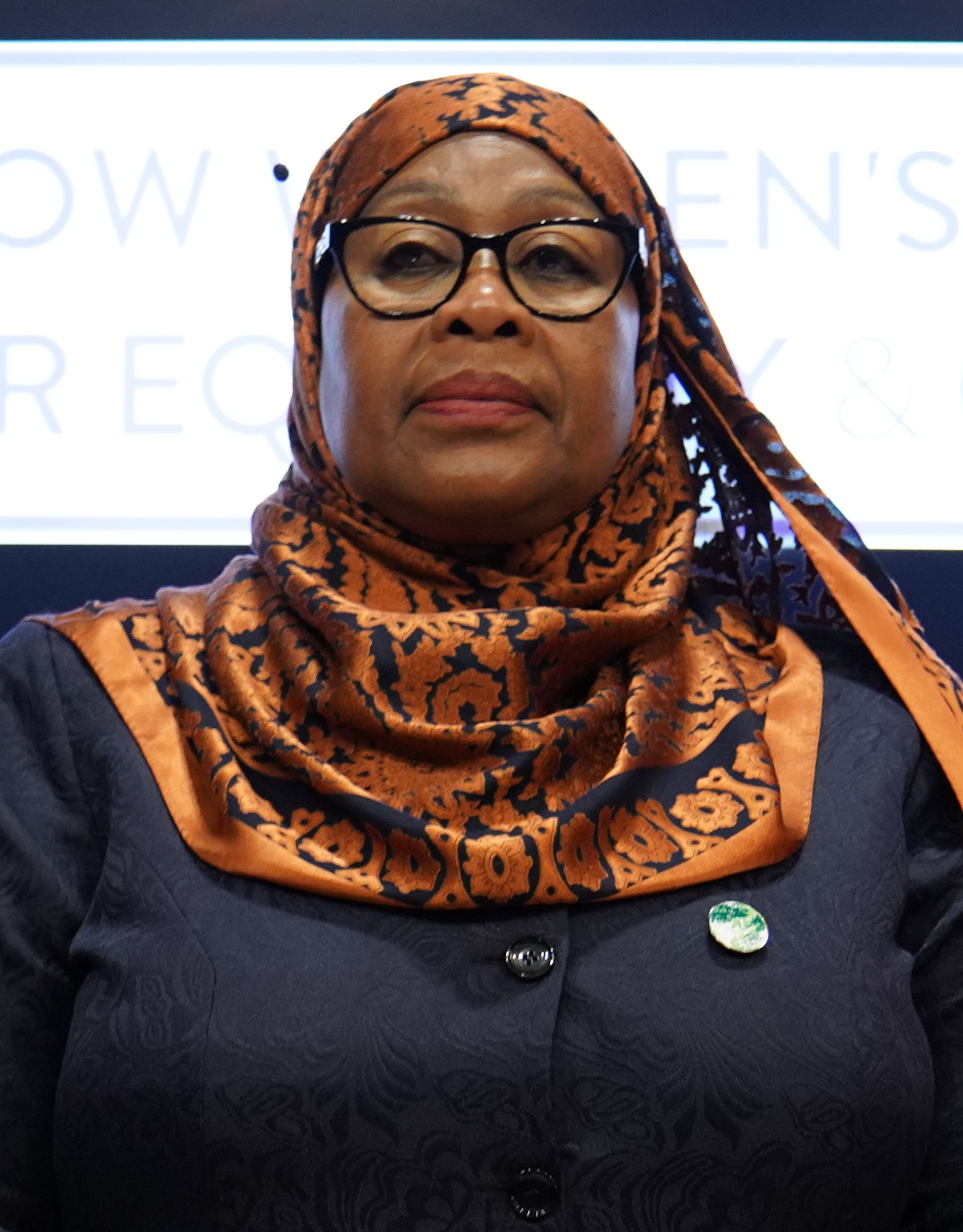
Samia Suluhu Hassan in 2021

- Tanzania

- Presidents (complete list) –

- John Magufuli, president (5 November 2015 – 17 March 2021)
- Samia Suluhu Hassan, president (since 19 March 2021)

- Prime ministers (complete list) –

- Kassim Majaliwa, prime minister (20 November 2015 – 13 November 2025)
- Mwigulu Nchemba, prime minister (since 13 November 2025)

- Uganda

- Presidents (complete list) –

- Yoweri Museveni, president (since 29 January 1986)

- Prime ministers (complete list) –

- Ruhakana Rugunda, Prime minister (18 September 2014 – 21 June 2021)
- Robinah Nabbanja, Prime minister (since 21 June 2021)

- Zambia

- Presidents (complete list) –

- Edgar Lungu, president (25 January 2015 – 24 August 2021)
- Hakainde Hichilema, president (since 24 August 2021)

- Zimbabwe

- Presidents (complete list) –

- Emmerson Mnangagwa, president (since 24 November 2017)

=== Africa: North ===
- Algeria

- Presidents (complete list) –

- Abdelmadjid Tebboune, president (since 19 December 2019)

- Prime ministers (complete list) –

- Abdelaziz Djerad, prime minister (28 December 2019 – 30 June 2021)
- Aymen Benabderrahmane, prime minister (30 June 2021 – 11 November 2023)
- Nadir Larbaoui, prime minister (11 November 2023 – 28 August 2025)
- Sifi Ghrieb, acting prime minister (28 August 2025 – 14 September 2025); prime minister (since 14 September 2025)

- Egypt

- Presidents (complete list) –

- Abdel Fattah el-Sisi, president (since 8 June 2014)

- Prime ministers (complete list) –

- Mostafa Madbouly, prime minister (since 14 June 2018)

- Libya

- Heads of state (complete list) –

- Aguila Saleh Issa, contesting president of the House of Representatives (5 August 2014 – 15 March 2021)
- Fayez al-Sarraj, contesting chairman of the Presidential Council (30 March 2016 – 15 March 2021)
- Mohamed al-Menfi, chairman of the Presidential Council (since 15 March 2021)

- Prime ministers (complete list) –

- Fayez al-Sarraj, prime minister (5 April 2016 – 15 March 2021)
- Abdul Hamid Dbeibeh, prime minister (since 15 March 2021)

- Morocco

- Monarchs (complete list) –

- Mohammed VI, king (since 23 July 1999)

- Prime ministers (complete list) –

- Saadeddine Othmani, prime minister (17 March 2017 – 7 October 2021)
- Aziz Akhannouch, prime minister (7 October 2021 – 29 September 2026)
- Fatima Ezzahra El Mansouri, prime minister (since 29 September 2026)

- Sahrawi Arab Democratic Republic

- General secretaries of the Polisario Front (complete list) –

- Brahim Ghali, general secretary (since 12 July 2016)

- Presidents (complete list) –

- Brahim Ghali, president (since 12 July 2016)

- Prime ministers (complete list) –

- Mohamed Wali Akeik, prime minister (4 February 2018 – 13 January 2020)
- Bouchraya Hammoudi Bayoun, prime minister (since 13 January 2020)

- Sudan

- Heads of state (complete list)

- Abdel Fattah al-Burhan, chairman of the Transitional Sovereignty Council (20 August 2019 – 25 October 2021, since 11 November 2021); de facto leader (25 October 2021 – 11 November 2021)

- Prime ministers (complete list)

- Abdalla Hamdok, prime minister (21 August 2019 – 25 October 2021, 21 November 2021 – 2 January 2022)
- Osman Hussein, acting prime minister (19 January 2022 – 30 April 2025)
- Dafallah al-Haj Ali, acting prime minister (30 April 2025 – 31 May 2025)
- Kamil Idris, prime minister (since 31 May 2025)

- Tunisia

- Presidents (complete list) –

- Kais Saied, president (since 23 October 2019)

- Prime ministers (complete list) –

- Youssef Chahed, prime minister (27 August 2016 – 27 February 2020)
- Elyes Fakhfakh, prime minister (27 February 2020 – 2 September 2020)
- Hichem Mechichi, prime minister (2 September 2020 – 25 July 2021)
- Najla Bouden, prime minister (11 October 2021 – 1 August 2023)
- Ahmed Hachani, prime minister (1 August 2023 – 7 August 2024)
- Kamel Madouri, prime minister (7 August 2024 – 21 March 2025)
- Sara Zaafarani, prime minister (since 21 March 2025)

=== Africa: South ===
- Botswana

- Presidents (complete list) –

- Mokgweetsi Masisi, president (1 April 2018 – 1 November 2024)
- Duma Boko, president (since 1 November 2024)

- Eswatini

- tiNgwenyama (complete list) –

- Mswati III, Ngwenyama (since 25 April 1986)

- tiNdlovukati (complete list) –

- Ntfombi, Ndlovukati (since 10 August 1986)

- Prime ministers (complete list) –

- Ambrose Mandvulo Dlamini, prime minister (27 October 2018 – 13 December 2020)
- Themba Masuku, acting prime minister (13 December 2020 – 19 July 2021)
- Cleopas Dlamini, prime minister (19 July 2021 – 28 September 2023)
- Mgwagwa Gamedze, acting prime minister (28 September 2023 – 4 November 2023)
- Russell Dlamini, prime minister (since 4 November 2023)

- Lesotho

- Monarchs (complete list) –

- Letsie III, king (since 7 February 1996)

- Prime ministers (complete list) –

- Tom Thabane, prime minister (16 June 2017 – 19 May 2020)
- Moeketsi Majoro, prime minister (20 May 2020 – 28 October 2022)
- Sam Matekane, prime minister (since 28 October 2022)

- Namibia

- Presidents (complete list) –

- Hage Geingob, president (21 March 2015 – 4 February 2024)
- Nangolo Mbumba, president (4 February 2024 – 21 March 2025)
- Netumbo Nandi-Ndaitwah, president (since 21 March 2025)

- Prime ministers (complete list) –

- Saara Kuugongelwa, prime minister (21 March 2015 – 21 March 2025)
- Elijah Ngurare, prime minister (since 21 March 2025)

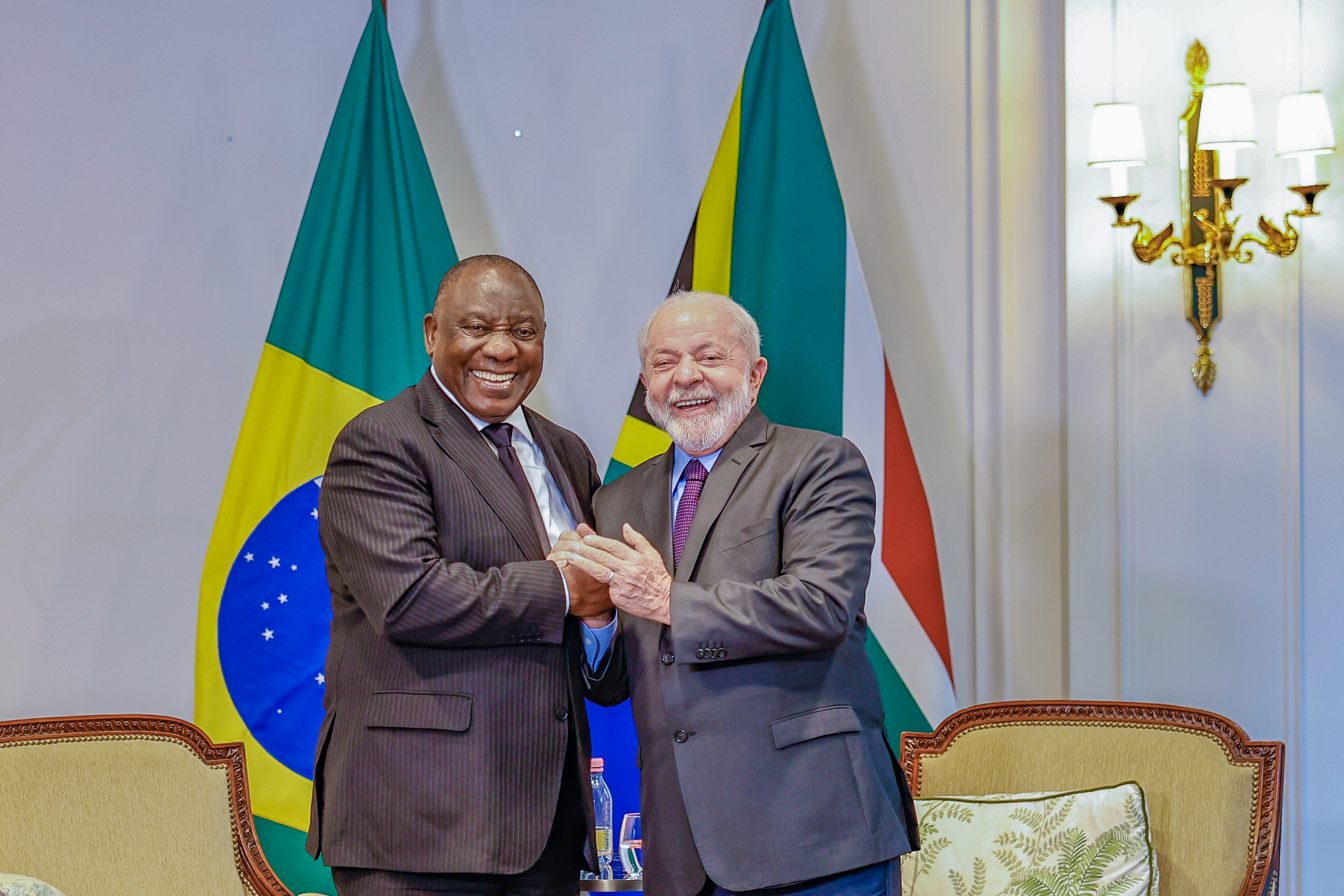
Cyril Ramaphosa and Lula da Silva in 2023

- South Africa

- Presidents (complete list) –

- Cyril Ramaphosa, president (since 15 February 2018)

=== Africa: West ===
- Benin

- Presidents (complete list) –

- Patrice Talon, president (6 April 2016 – 24 May 2026)
- Romuald Wadagni, president (24 May 2026)

- Burkina Faso

- Heads of state (complete list) –

- Roch Marc Christian Kaboré, president (29 December 2015 – 24 January 2022)
- Paul-Henri Sandaogo Damiba, president of the Patriotic Movement for Safeguard and Restoration (24 January 2022 – 30 September 2022), interim president (31 January 2022 – 30 September 2022)
- Ibrahim Traoré, president of the Patriotic Movement for Safeguard and Restoration (since 30 September 2022), interim president (since 6 October 2022)

- Prime ministers (complete list) –

- Christophe Joseph Marie Dabiré, prime minister (21 January 2019 – 28 December 2020, 5 January 2021 – 8 December 2021)
- Lassina Zerbo, prime minister (10 December 2021 – 24 January 2022)
- Albert Ouédraogo, interim prime minister (3 March 2022 – 30 September 2022)
- Apollinaire J. Kyélem de Tambèla, interim prime minister (21 October 2022 – 6 December 2024)
- Jean Emmanuel Ouédraogo, interim prime minister (since 7 December 2024)

- Cape Verde

- Presidents (complete list) –

- Jorge Carlos Fonseca, president (9 September 2011 – 9 November 2021)
- José Maria Neves, president (9 November 2021 – 15 September 2026)
- Janira Hopffer Almada, acting president (since 15 September 2026)

- Prime ministers (complete list) –

- Ulisses Correia e Silva, prime minister (22 April 2016 – 19 June 2026)
- Francisco Carvalho, prime minister (since 19 June 2026)

- Gambia

- Presidents (complete list) –

- Adama Barrow, president (since 19 January 2017)

- Ghana

- Presidents (complete list) –

- Nana Akufo-Addo, president (7 January 2017 – 7 January 2025)
- John Mahama, president (since 7 January 2025)

- Guinea

- Heads of state (complete list) –

- Alpha Condé, president (21 December 2010 – 5 September 2021)
- Mamady Doumbouya, chairman of the National Committee of Reconciliation and Development (since 5 September 2021), interim president (since 1 October 2021)

- Prime ministers (complete list) –

- Ibrahima Kassory Fofana, prime minister (24 May 2018 – 5 September 2021)
- Mohamed Béavogui, interim prime minister (6 October 2021 – 17 July 2022)
- Bernard Goumou, interim prime minister (17 July 2022 – 19 February 2024)
- Bah Oury, interim prime minister (since 28 February 2024)

- Guinea-Bissau

- Presidents (complete list) –

- José Mário Vaz, president (23 June 2014 – 27 February 2020)
- Umaro Sissoco Embaló, president (27 February 2020 – 26 November 2025)
- Horta Inta-A Na Man, acting president (since 27 November 2025)

- Prime ministers (complete list) –

- Aristides Gomes, prime minister (8 November 2019 – 28 February 2020)
- Nuno Gomes Nabiam, prime minister (28 February 2020 – 8 August 2023)
- Geraldo Martins, prime minister (8 August 2023 – 21 December 2023)
- Rui Duarte de Barros, prime minister (21 December 2023 – 7 August 2025)
- Braima Camará, prime minister (7 August 2025 – 27 November 2025)
- Ilídio Vieira Té, prime minister (since 28 November 2025)

- Ivory Coast

- Presidents (complete list) –

- Alassane Ouattara, president (since 4 December 2010)

- Prime ministers (complete list) –

- Amadou Gon Coulibaly, prime minister (10 January 2017 – 8 July 2020)
- Hamed Bakayoko, prime minister (8 July 2020 – 8 March 2021)
- Patrick Achi, prime minister (8 March 2021 – 17 October 2023)
- Robert Beugré Mambé, prime minister (since 17 October 2023)

- Liberia

- Presidents (complete list) –

- George Weah, president (22 January 2018 – 22 January 2024)
- Joseph Boakai, president (since 22 January 2024)

- Mali

- Heads of state (complete list) –

- Ibrahim Boubacar Keïta, president (4 September 2013 – 18 August 2020)
- Assimi Goïta, chairman of the National Committee for the Salvation of the People (18 August 2020 – 25 September 2020), interim president (24 May 2021 – 8 July 2025), president (since 8 July 2025)
- Bah Ndaw, interim president (25 September 2020 – 24 May 2021)

- Prime ministers (complete list) –

- Boubou Cissé, prime minister (23 April 2019 – 18 August 2020)
- Moctar Ouane, acting prime minister (27 September 2020 – 24 May 2021)
- Choguel Kokalla Maïga, prime minister (6 June 2021 – 20 November 2024)
- Abdoulaye Maïga, interim prime minister (21 August 2022 – 5 December 2022, since 21 November 2024)

- Mauritania

- Presidents (complete list) –

- Mohamed Ould Ghazouani, president (since 1 August 2019)

- Prime ministers (complete list) –

- Ismail Ould Bedde Ould Cheikh Sidiya, prime minister (5 August 2019 – 6 August 2020)
- Mohamed Ould Bilal, prime minister (6 August 2020 – 2 August 2024)
- Mokhtar Ould Djay, prime minister (since 2 August 2024)

- Niger

- Heads of state (complete list) –

- Mahamadou Issoufou, president (7 April 2011 – 2 April 2021)
- Mohamed Bazoum, president (2 April 2021 – 26 July 2023)
- Abdourahamane Tiani, president of the National Council for the Safeguard of the Homeland (since 28 July 2023), president (since 26 March 2025)

- Prime ministers (complete list) –

- Brigi Rafini, prime minister (7 April 2011 – 2 April 2021)
- Ouhoumoudou Mahamadou, prime minister (3 April 2021 – 26 July 2023)
- Ali Lamine Zeine, prime minister (since 8 August 2023)

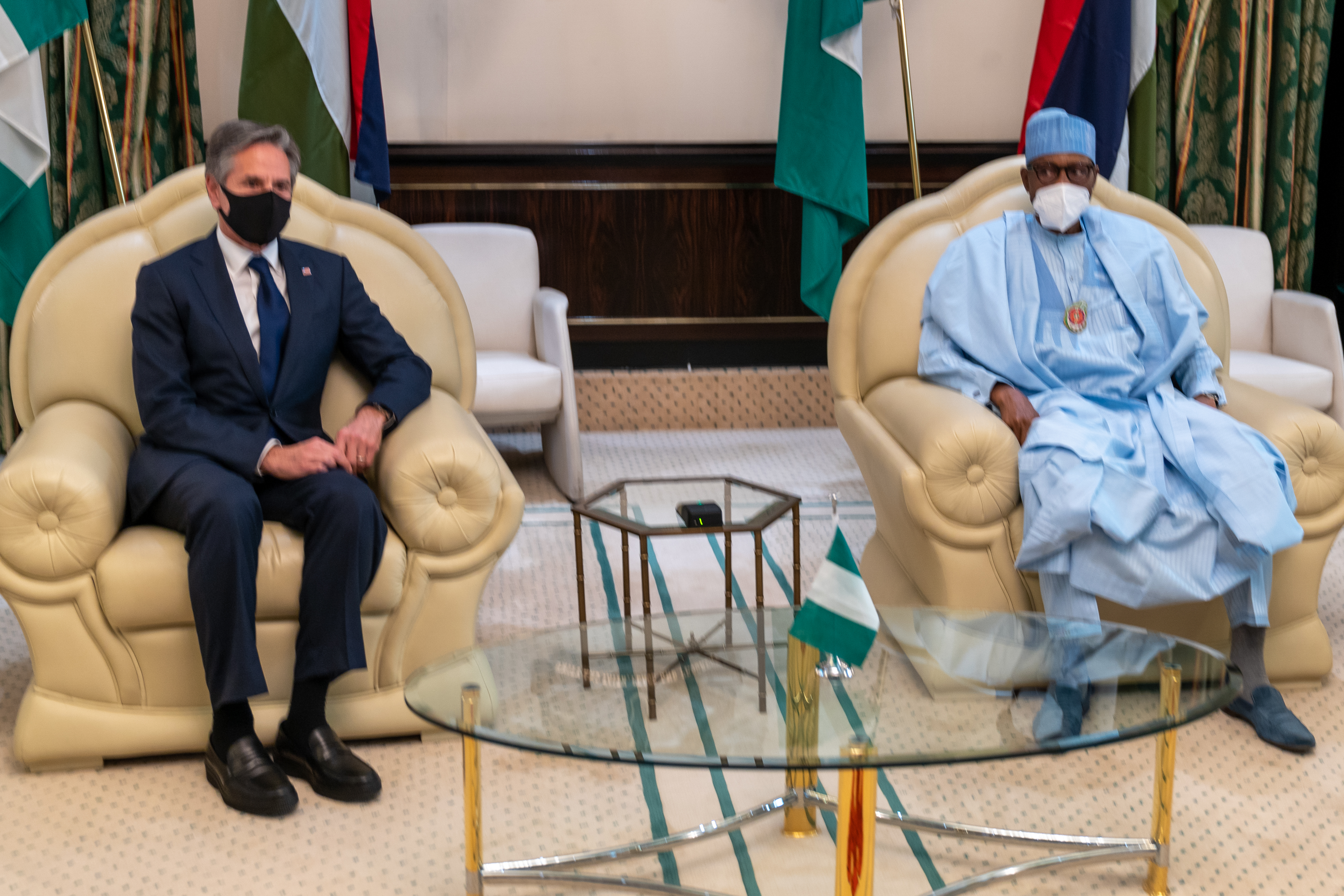
Muhammadu Buhari in 2021

- Nigeria

- Presidents (complete list) –

- Muhammadu Buhari, president (29 May 2015 – 29 May 2023)
- Bola Tinubu, president (since 29 May 2023)

- Senegal

- Presidents (complete list) –

- Macky Sall, president (2 April 2012 – 2 April 2024)
- Bassirou Diomaye Faye, president (since 2 April 2024)

- Prime ministers (complete list) –

- Amadou Ba, prime minister (17 September 2022 – 6 March 2024)
- Sidiki Kaba, prime minister (6 March 2024 – 3 April 2024)
- Ousmane Sonko, prime minister (3 April 2024 – 22 May 2026)
- Ahmadou Al Aminou Lo, prime minister (since 25 May 2026)

- Sierra Leone

- Presidents (complete list) –

- Julius Maada Bio, president (since 4 April 2018)

- Chief ministers (complete list) –

- David J. Francis, chief minister (8 May 2018 – 30 April 2021)
- Jacob Jusu Saffa, chief minister (30 April 2021 – 10 July 2023)
- David Moinina Sengeh, chief minister (since 10 July 2023)

- Togo

- Presidents (complete list) –

- Faure Gnassingbé, president (4 May 2005 – 3 May 2025)
- Jean-Lucien Savi de Tové, president (since 3 May 2025)

- Heads of government (complete list) –

- Komi Sélom Klassou, prime minister (10 June 2015 – 28 September 2020)
- Victoire Tomegah Dogbé, prime minister (28 September 2020 – 3 May 2025)
- Faure Gnassingbé, president of the Council of Ministers (since 3 May 2025)

== Americas ==
=== Americas: Caribbean ===
- Antigua and Barbuda

- Monarchs (complete list) –

- Elizabeth II, queen (1 November 1981 – 8 September 2022)
- Charles III, king (since 8 September 2022)

- Governors-general (complete list) –

- Rodney Williams, governor-general (since 14 August 2014)

- Prime ministers (complete list) –

- Gaston Browne, prime minister (since 13 June 2014)

- The Bahamas

- Monarchs (complete list) –

- Elizabeth II, queen (10 July 1973 – 8 September 2022)
- Charles III, king (since 8 September 2022)

- Governors-general (complete list) –

- Cornelius A. Smith, governor-general (28 June 2019 – 31 August 2023)
- Cynthia A. Pratt, governor-general (since 1 September 2023)

- Prime ministers (complete list) –

- Hubert Minnis, prime minister (11 May 2017 – 17 September 2021)
- Philip Davis, prime minister (since 17 September 2021)

- Barbados

- Monarchs (complete list) –

- Elizabeth II, queen (30 November 1966 – 30 November 2021)

- Governors-general (complete list) –

- Sandra Mason, governor-general (8 January 2018 – 30 November 2021)

- Presidents (complete list) –

- Sandra Mason, president (30 November 2021 – 30 November 2025)
- Jeffrey Bostic, president (since 30 November 2025)

- Prime ministers (complete list) –

- Mia Mottley, prime minister (since 25 May 2018)

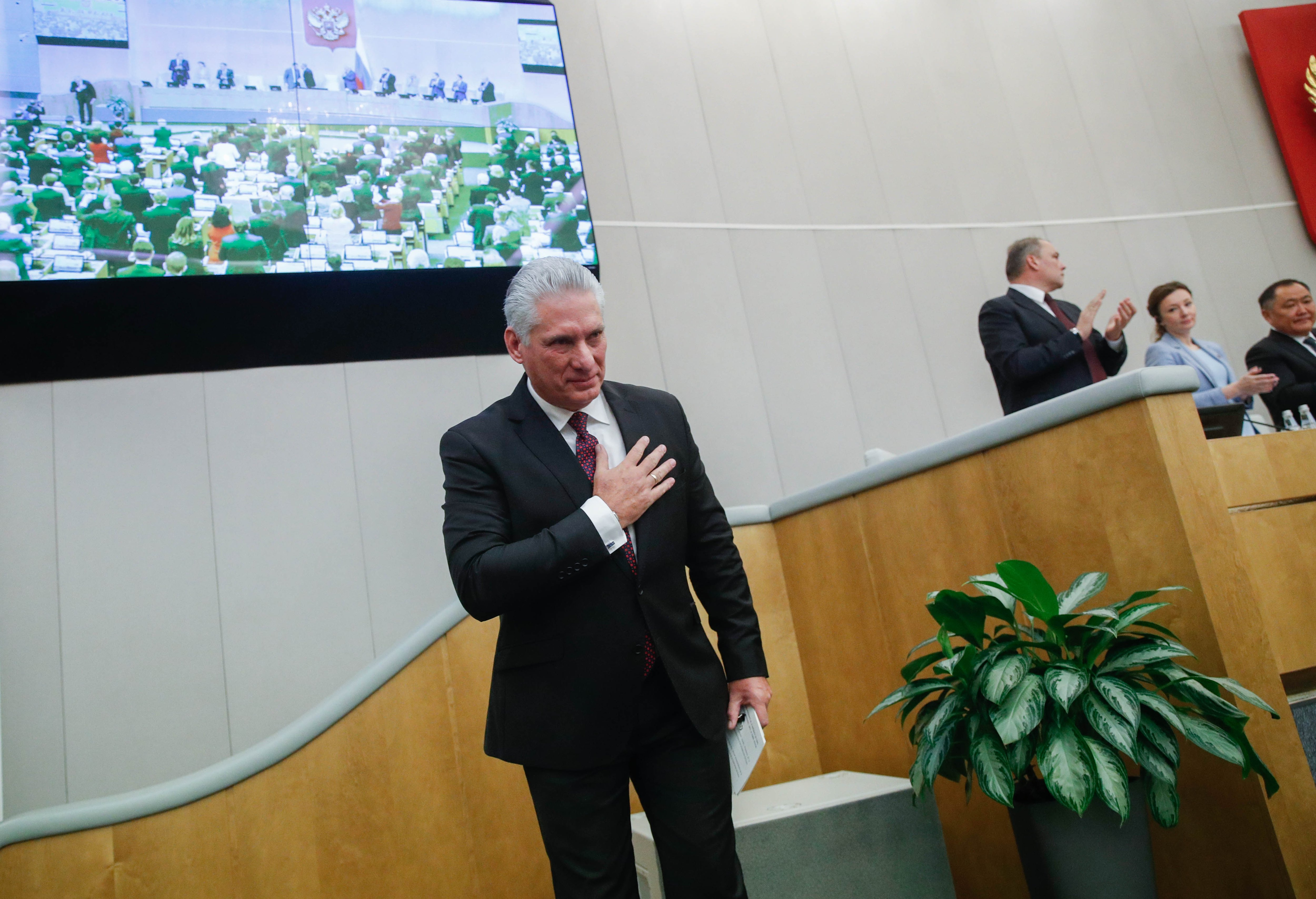
Miguel Díaz-Canel in 2022

- Cuba

- First secretaries of the Communist Party (complete list)

- Raúl Castro, first secretary (19 April 2011 – 19 April 2021)
- Miguel Díaz-Canel, first secretary (since 19 April 2021)

- Presidents (complete list) –

- Miguel Díaz-Canel, president (since 10 October 2019)

- Prime ministers (complete list) –

- Manuel Marrero Cruz, prime minister (since 21 December 2019)

- Dominica

- Presidents (complete list) –

- Charles Savarin, president (2 October 2013 – 2 October 2023)
- Sylvanie Burton, president (since 2 October 2023)

- Prime ministers (complete list) –

- Roosevelt Skerrit, prime minister (since 8 January 2004)

- Dominican Republic

- Presidents (complete list) –

- Danilo Medina, president (16 August 2012 – 16 August 2020)
- Luis Abinader, president (since 16 August 2020)

- Grenada

- Monarchs (complete list) –

- Elizabeth II, queen (7 February 1974 – 8 September 2022)
- Charles III, king (since 8 September 2022)

- Governors-general (complete list) –

- Cécile La Grenade, governor-general (since 7 May 2013)

- Prime ministers (complete list) –

- Keith Mitchell, prime minister (20 February 2013 – 24 June 2022)
- Dickon Mitchell, prime minister (since 24 June 2022)

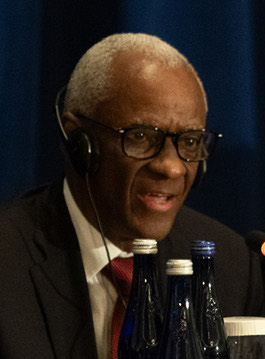
Edgard Leblanc Fils in 2024

- Haiti

- Heads of state (complete list) –

- Jovenel Moïse, president (7 February 2017 – 7 July 2021)
- Council of Ministers (7 July 2021 – 24 April 2024)
- Edgard Leblanc Fils, chairman of the Transitional Presidential Council (25 April 2024 — 7 October 2024)
- Leslie Voltaire, chairman of the Transitional Presidential Council (7 October 2024 – 7 March 2025)
- Fritz Jean, chairman of the Transitional Presidential Council (7 March 2025 – 7 August 2025)
- Laurent Saint-Cyr, chairman of the Transitional Presidential Council (7 August 2025 – 7 February 2026)

- Prime ministers (complete list) –

- Jean-Michel Lapin, acting prime minister (21 March 2019 – 4 March 2020)
- Joseph Jouthe, prime minister (4 March 2020 – 14 April 2021)
- Claude Joseph, acting prime minister (14 April 2021 – 20 July 2021)
- Ariel Henry, acting prime minister (20 July 2021 – 24 April 2024)
- Michel Patrick Boisvert, acting prime minister (25 February 2024 – 3 June 2024)
- Garry Conille, acting prime minister (3 June 2024 – 10 November 2024)
- Alix Didier Fils-Aimé, interim prime minister (since 10 November 2024)

- Jamaica

- Monarchs (complete list) –

- Elizabeth II, queen (6 August 1962 – 8 September 2022)
- Charles III, king (since 8 September 2022)

- Governors-general (complete list) –

- Patrick Allen, governor-general (since 26 February 2009)

- Prime ministers (complete list) –

- Andrew Holness, prime minister (since 3 March 2016)

- Saint Kitts and Nevis

- Monarchs (complete list) –

- Elizabeth II, queen (19 September 1983 – 8 September 2022)
- Charles III, king (since 8 September 2022)

- Governors-general (complete list) –

- Tapley Seaton, governor-general (2 September 2015 – 31 January 2023)
- Marcella Liburd, governor-general (since 1 February 2023)

- Prime ministers (complete list) –

- Timothy Harris, prime minister (18 February 2015 – 6 August 2022)
- Terrance Drew, prime minister (since 6 August 2022)

- Saint Lucia

- Monarchs (complete list) –

- Elizabeth II, queen (22 February 1979 – 8 September 2022)
- Charles III, king (since 8 September 2022)

- Governors-general (complete list) –

- Neville Cenac, governor-general (12 January 2018 – 31 October 2021)
- Errol Charles, acting governor-general (11 November 2021 – 31 October 2024); governor-general (1 November 2024 – 31 July 2026)
- Felix Finisterre, acting governor-general (since 1 August 2026)

- Prime ministers (complete list) –

- Allen Chastanet, prime minister (7 June 2016 – 28 July 2021)
- Philip J. Pierre, prime minister (since 28 July 2021)

- Saint Vincent and the Grenadines

- Monarchs (complete list) –

- Elizabeth II, queen (27 October 1979 – 8 September 2022)
- Charles III, king (since 8 September 2022)

- Governors-general (complete list) –

- Susan Dougan, governor-general (1 August 2019 – 5 January 2026)
- Stanley John, governor-general (since 6 January 2026)

- Prime ministers (complete list) –

- Ralph Gonsalves, prime minister (29 March 2001 – 28 November 2025)
- Godwin Friday, prime minister (since 28 November 2025)

- Trinidad and Tobago

- Presidents (complete list) –

- Paula-Mae Weekes, president (19 March 2018 – 20 March 2023)
- Christine Kangaloo, president (since 20 March 2023)

- Prime ministers (complete list) –

- Keith Rowley, prime minister (9 September 2015 – 17 March 2025)
- Stuart Young, prime minister (17 March 2025 – 1 May 2025)
- Kamla Persad-Bissessar, prime minister (since 1 May 2025)

=== Americas: Central ===
- Belize

- Monarchs (complete list) –

- Elizabeth II, queen (21 September 1981 – 8 September 2022)
- Charles III, king (since 8 September 2022)

- Governors-general (complete list) –

- Colville Young, governor-general (17 November 1993 – 30 April 2021)
- Stuart Leslie, acting governor-general (30 April 2021 – 27 May 2021)
- Froyla Tzalam, governor-general (since 27 May 2021)

- Prime ministers (complete list) –

- Dean Barrow, prime minister (8 February 2008 – 12 November 2020)
- Johnny Briceño, prime minister (since 12 November 2020)

- Costa Rica

- Presidents (complete list) –

- Carlos Alvarado Quesada, president (8 May 2018 – 8 May 2022)
- Rodrigo Chaves Robles, president (8 May 2022 – 8 May 2026)
- Laura Fernández Delgado, president (since 8 May 2026)

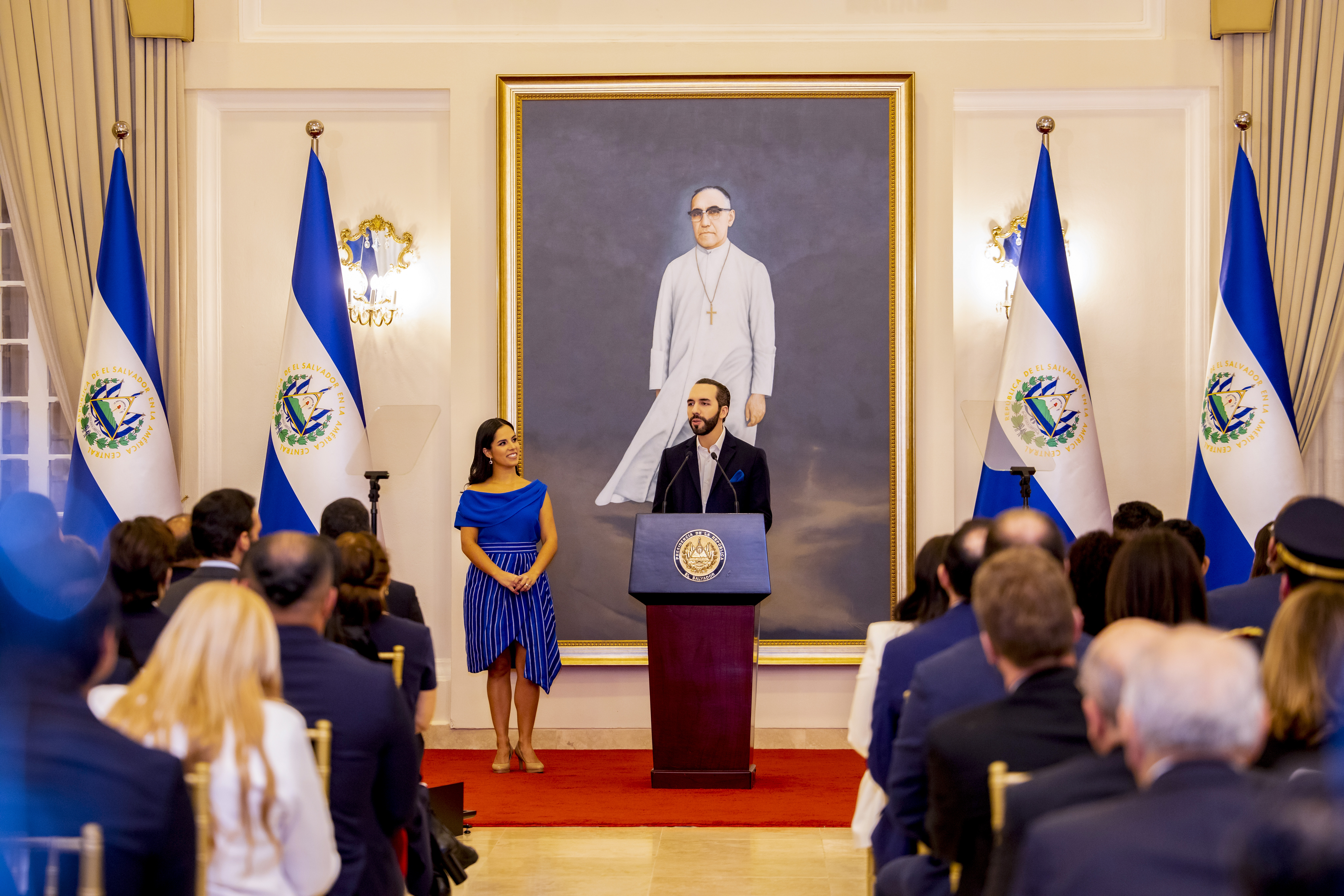
Nayib Bukele in 2022

- El Salvador

- Presidents (complete list) –

- Nayib Bukele, president (since 1 June 2019)
- Claudia Rodríguez de Guevara, acting president (1 December 2023 – 1 June 2024)

- Guatemala

- Presidents (complete list) –

- Jimmy Morales, president (14 January 2016 – 14 January 2020)
- Alejandro Giammattei, president (14 January 2020 – 14 January 2024)
- Bernardo Arévalo, president (since 14 January 2024)

- Honduras

- Presidents (complete list) –

- Juan Orlando Hernández, president (27 January 2014 – 27 January 2022)
- Xiomara Castro, president (since 27 January 2022 – 27 January 2026)
- Nasry Asfura, president (since 27 January 2026)

- Mexico

- Presidents (complete list) –

- Andrés Manuel López Obrador, president (1 December 2018 – 30 September 2024)
- Claudia Sheinbaum, president (since 1 October 2024)

- Nicaragua

- Presidents (complete list) –

- Daniel Ortega, president (10 January 2007 – 18 February 2025); co-president (since 18 February 2025)
- Rosario Murillo, co-president (since 18 February 2025)

- Panama

- Presidents (complete list) –

- Laurentino Cortizo, president (1 July 2019 – 1 July 2024)
- José Raúl Mulino, president (since 1 July 2024)

=== Americas: North ===
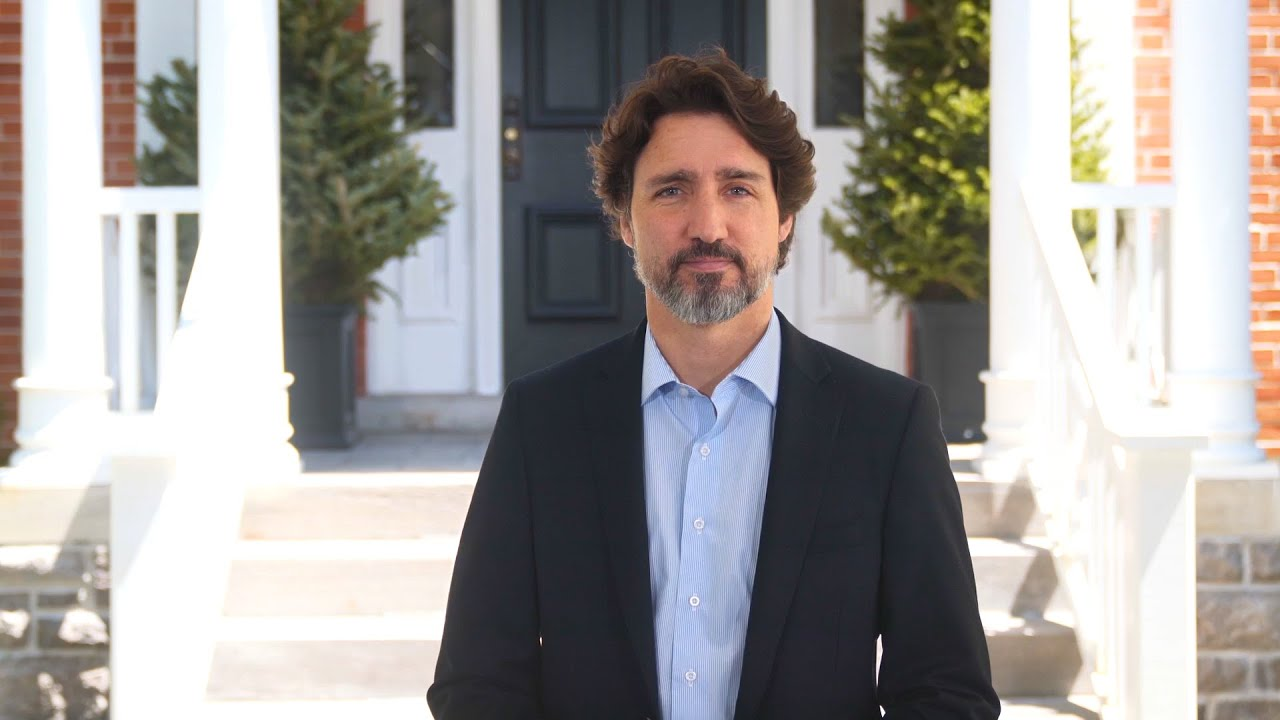
Justin Trudeau in 2020

Donald Trump and Joe Biden following the former's victory in the 2024 U.S presidential election

- Canada

- Monarchs (complete list) –

- Elizabeth II, queen (6 February 1952 – 8 September 2022)
- Charles III, king (since 8 September 2022)

- Governors general (complete list) –

- Julie Payette, governor general (2 October 2017 – 22 January 2021)
- Mary Simon, governor general (26 July 2021 – 8 June 2026)
- Louise Arbour, governor general (since 8 June 2026)

- Prime ministers (complete list) –

- Justin Trudeau, prime minister (4 November 2015 – 14 March 2025)
- Mark Carney, prime minister (since 14 March 2025)

- United States

- Presidents (complete list) –

- Donald Trump, president (20 January 2017 – 20 January 2021, since 20 January 2025)
- Joe Biden, president (20 January 2021 – 20 January 2025)

=== Americas: South ===
- Argentina

- Presidents (complete list) –

- Alberto Fernández, president (10 December 2019 – 10 December 2023)
- Javier Milei, president (since 10 December 2023)

- Bolivia

- Presidents (complete list) –

- Jeanine Áñez, president (12 November 2019 – 8 November 2020)
- Luis Arce, president (8 November 2020 – 8 November 2025)
- Rodrigo Paz Pereira, president (since 8 November 2025)

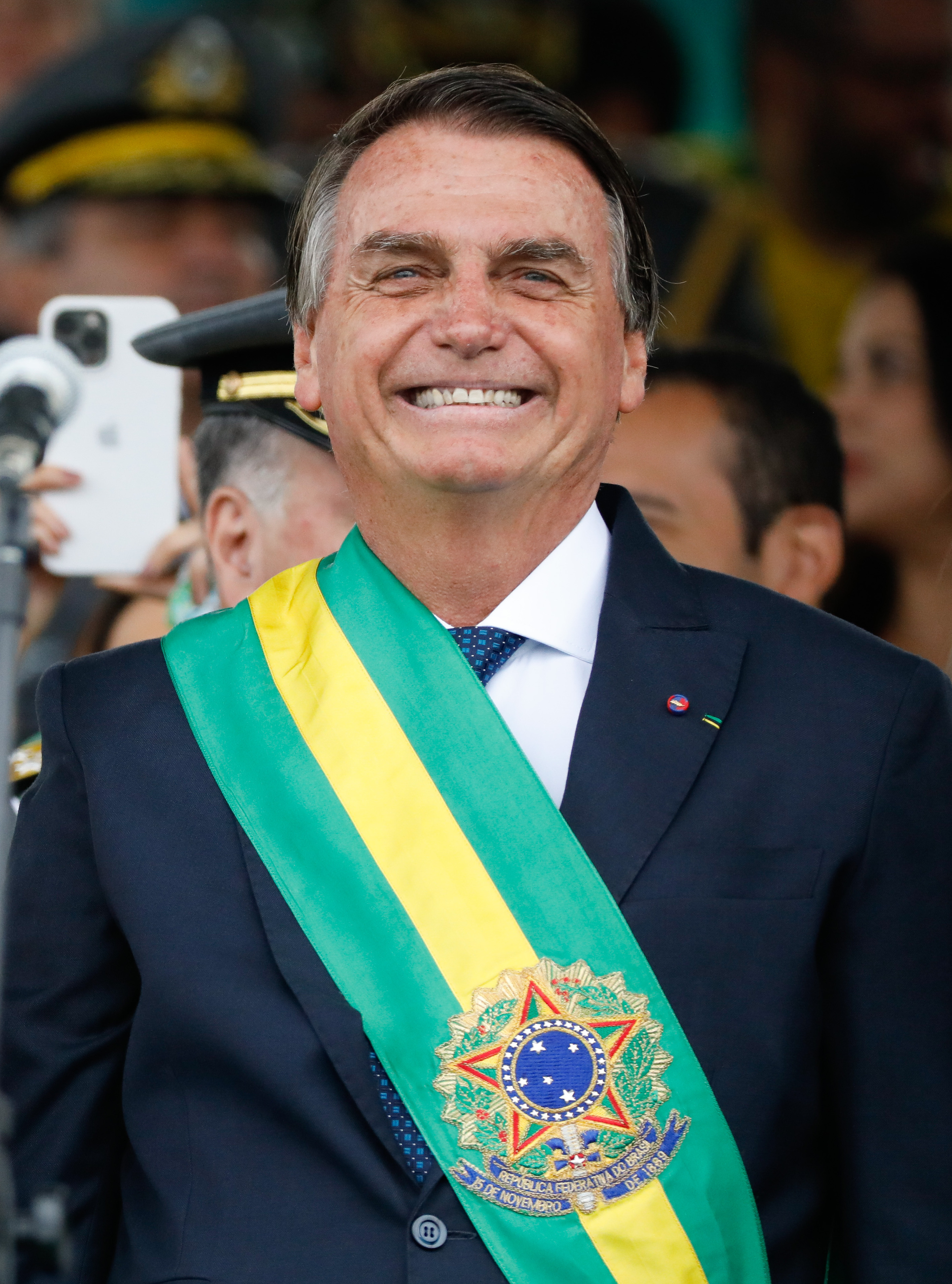
Jair Bolsonaro in 2022

- Brazil

- Presidents (complete list) –

- Jair Bolsonaro, president (1 January 2019 – 1 January 2023)
- Luiz Inácio Lula da Silva, president (since 1 January 2023)

- Chile

- Presidents (complete list) –

- Sebastián Piñera, president (11 March 2018 – 11 March 2022)
- Gabriel Boric, president (11 March 2022 – 11 March 2026)
- Jose Antonio Kast, president (since 11 March 2026)

- Colombia

- Presidents (complete list) –

- Iván Duque, president (7 August 2018 – 7 August 2022)
- Gustavo Petro, president (7 August 2022 – 7 August 2026)
- Abelardo de la Espriella, president (since 7 August 2026)

- Ecuador

- Presidents (complete list) –

- Lenín Moreno, president (24 May 2017 – 24 May 2021)
- Guillermo Lasso, president (24 May 2021 – 23 November 2023)
- Daniel Noboa, president (since 23 November 2023)

- Guyana

- Presidents (complete list) –

- David A. Granger, president (16 May 2015 – 2 August 2020)
- Irfaan Ali, president (since 2 August 2020)

- Prime ministers (complete list) –

- Moses Nagamootoo, prime minister (20 May 2015 – 2 August 2020)
- Mark Phillips, prime minister (since 2 August 2020)

- Paraguay

- Presidents (complete list) –

- Mario Abdo Benítez, president (15 August 2018 – 15 August 2023)
- Santiago Peña, president (15 August 2023 – 6 November 2026)
- Pedro Alliana, president (since 6 November 2026)

- Peru

- Presidents (complete list) –

- Martín Vizcarra, president (23 March 2018 – 9 November 2020)
- Manuel Merino, president (10 November 2020 – 15 November 2020)
- Francisco Sagasti, president (17 November 2020 – 28 July 2021)
- Pedro Castillo, president (28 July 2021 – 7 December 2022)
- Dina Boluarte, president (7 December 2022 – 10 October 2025)
- José Jerí, president (since 10 October 2025 – 17 February 2026)
- José María Balcázar, president (18 February 2026 – 28 July 2026)
- Keiko Fujimori, president (since 28 July 2026)

- Prime ministers (complete list) –

- Vicente Zeballos, prime minister (30 September 2019 – 15 July 2020)
- Pedro Cateriano, prime minister (15 July 2020 – 6 August 2020)
- Walter Martos, prime minister (6 August 2020 – 9 November 2020)
- Ántero Flores Aráoz, prime minister (11 November 2020 – 15 November 2020)
- Violeta Bermúdez, prime minister (18 November 2020 – 28 July 2021)
- Guido Bellido, prime minister (29 July 2021 – 6 October 2021)
- Mirtha Vásquez, prime minister (6 October 2021 – 1 February 2022)
- Héctor Valer, prime minister (1 February 2022 – 8 February 2022)
- Aníbal Torres, prime minister (8 February 2022 – 24 November 2022)
- Betssy Chávez, prime minister (26 November 2022 – 7 December 2022)
- Pedro Angulo Arana, prime minister (11 December 2022 – 21 December 2022)
- Alberto Otárola, prime minister (21 December 2022 – 5 March 2024)
- Gustavo Adrianzén, prime minister (6 March 2024 – 13 May 2025)
- Eduardo Arana Ysa, prime minister (14 May 2025 – 14 October 2025)
- Ernesto Álvarez Miranda, prime minister (14 October 2025 – 23 February 2026)
- Denisse Miralles, prime minister (24 February 2026 – 28 July 2026)
- Luis Galarreta, prime minister (since 28 July 2026)

- Suriname

- Presidents (complete list) –

- Dési Bouterse, president (12 August 2010 – 16 July 2020)
- Chan Santokhi, president (16 July 2020 – 16 July 2025)
- Jennifer Geerlings-Simons, president (since 16 July 2025)

- Uruguay

- Presidents (complete list) –

- Tabaré Vázquez, president (1 March 2015 – 1 March 2020)
- Luis Lacalle Pou, president (1 March 2020 – 1 March 2025)
- Yamandú Orsi, president (since 1 March 2025)

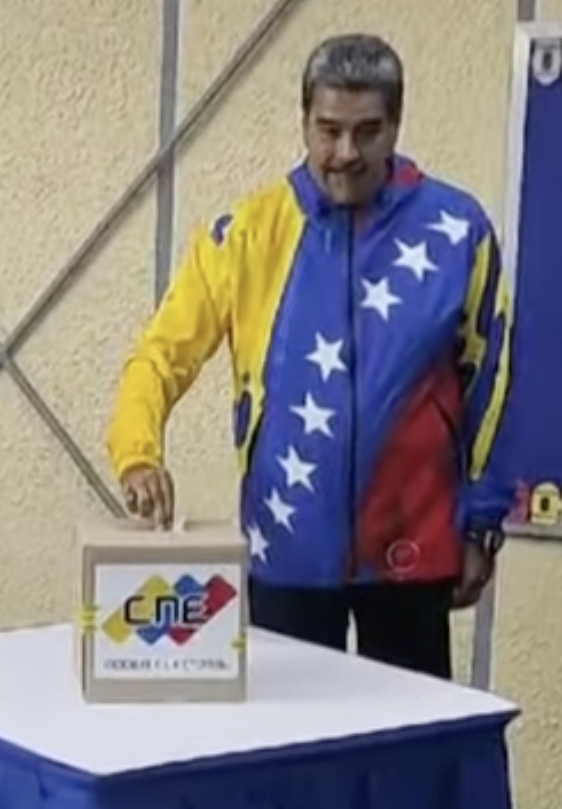
Nicolás Maduro in 2024

- Venezuela

- Presidents (complete list) –

- Nicolás Maduro, president (19 April 2013 – 3 January 2026, disputed from 23 January 2019 – 5 January 2023)
- Juan Guaidó, acting president (23 January 2019 – 5 January 2023, disputed with Nicolás Maduro)
- Delcy Rodríguez, acting president (since 3 January 2026)

== Asia ==
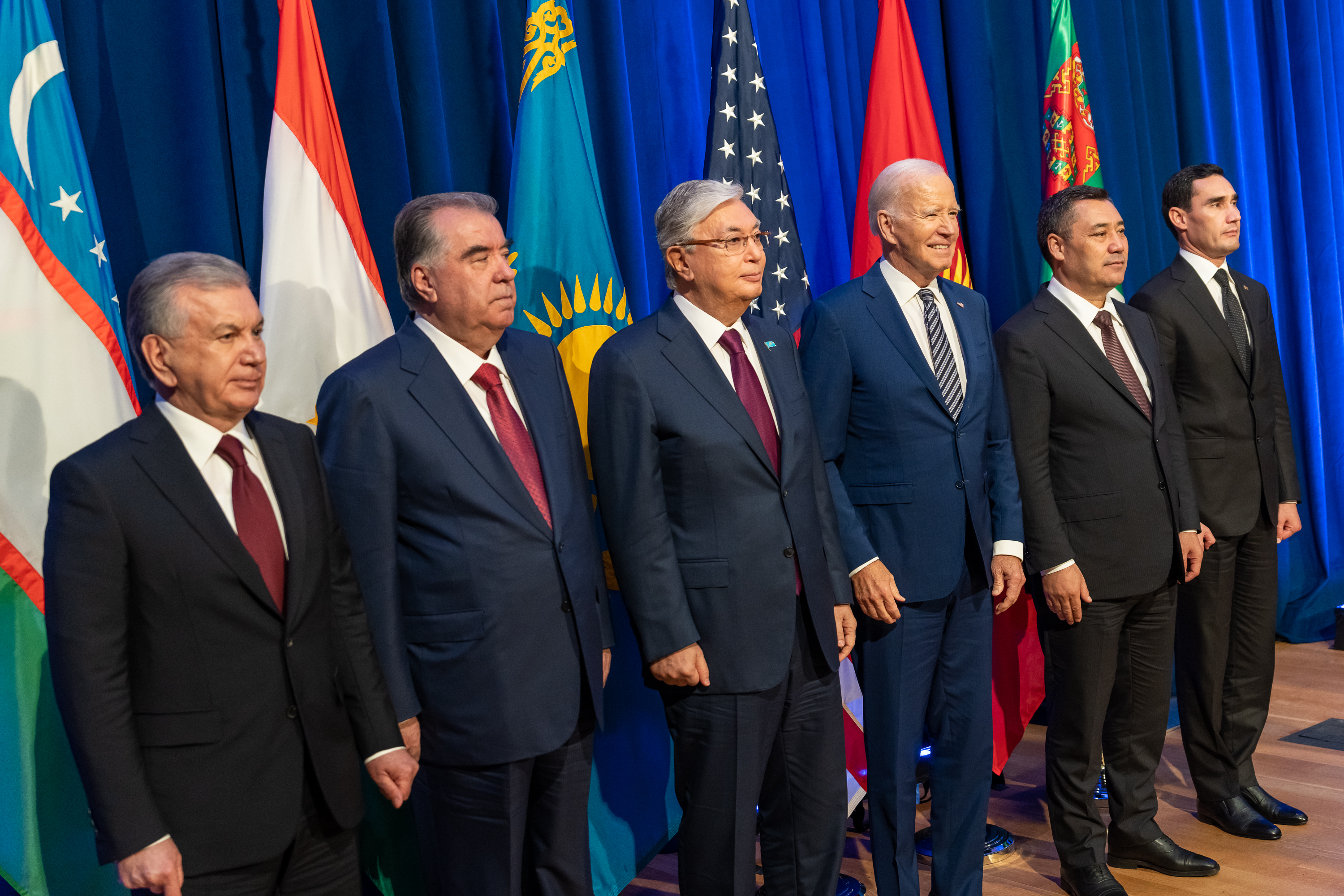
Central Asian heads of state meet President of the United States Joe Biden, 19 September 2023. From left to right: Shavkat Mirziyoyev, Emomali Rahmon, Kassym-Jomart Tokayev, Joe Biden, Sadyr Japarov and Serdar Berdimuhamedow

=== Asia: Central ===
- Kazakhstan

- Presidents (complete list) –

- Kassym-Jomart Tokayev, president (since 12 June 2019)

- Prime ministers (complete list) –

- Asqar Mamin, prime minister (21 February 2019 – 5 January 2022)
- Älihan Smaiylov, acting prime minister (5 January 2022 – 11 January 2022); prime minister (11 January 2022 – 5 February 2024)
- Roman Sklyar, acting prime minister (5 February 2024 – 6 February 2024)
- Oljas Bektenov, prime minister (since 6 February 2024)

- Kyrgyzstan

- Presidents (complete list) –

- Sooronbay Jeenbekov, president (24 November 2017 – 15 October 2020)
- Sadyr Japarov, acting president (15 October 2020 – 14 November 2020); president (since 28 January 2021)
- Talant Mamytov, acting president (14 November 2020 – 28 January 2021)

- Heads of government (complete list) –

- Mukhammedkalyi Abylgaziev, prime minister (20 April 2018 – 15 June 2020)
- Kubatbek Boronov, prime minister (17 June 2020 – 6 October 2020)
- Sadyr Japarov, acting prime minister (6 October 2020 – 10 October 2020, disputed with Almazbek Batyrbekov after 9 October 2020); prime minister (10 October 2020 – 14 November 2020, disputed with Almazbek Batyrbekov before 14 October 2020)
- Almazbek Batyrbekov, acting prime minister (9 October 2020 – 14 October 2020, disputed with Sadyr Japarov)
- Artem Novikov, acting prime minister (14 November 2020 – 3 February 2021)
- Ulukbek Maripov, prime minister (3 February 2021 – 5 May 2021); chairman of the Cabinet of Ministers (5 May 2021 – 12 October 2021)
- Akylbek Japarov, acting chairman of the Cabinet of Ministers (12 October 2021 – 13 October 2021); chairman of the Cabinet of Ministers (13 October 2021 – 16 December 2024)
- Adylbek Kasymaliev, acting chairman of the Cabinet of Ministers (16 December 2024 – 18 December 2024); chairman of the Cabinet of Ministers (since 18 December 2024)

- Tajikistan

- Presidents (complete list) –

- Emomali Rahmon, president (since 16 November 1994)

- Prime ministers (complete list) –

- Kokhir Rasulzoda, prime minister (since 23 November 2013)

- Turkmenistan

- Heads of state and government (complete list) –

- Gurbanguly Berdimuhamedow, president (14 February 2007 – 19 March 2022); chairman of the People's Council (since 21 January 2023)
- Serdar Berdimuhamedow, president (since 19 March 2022)

- Uzbekistan

- Presidents (complete list) –

- Shavkat Mirziyoyev, president (since 14 December 2016)

- Prime ministers (complete list) –

- Abdulla Aripov, prime minister (since 14 December 2016)

=== Asia: East ===
- China

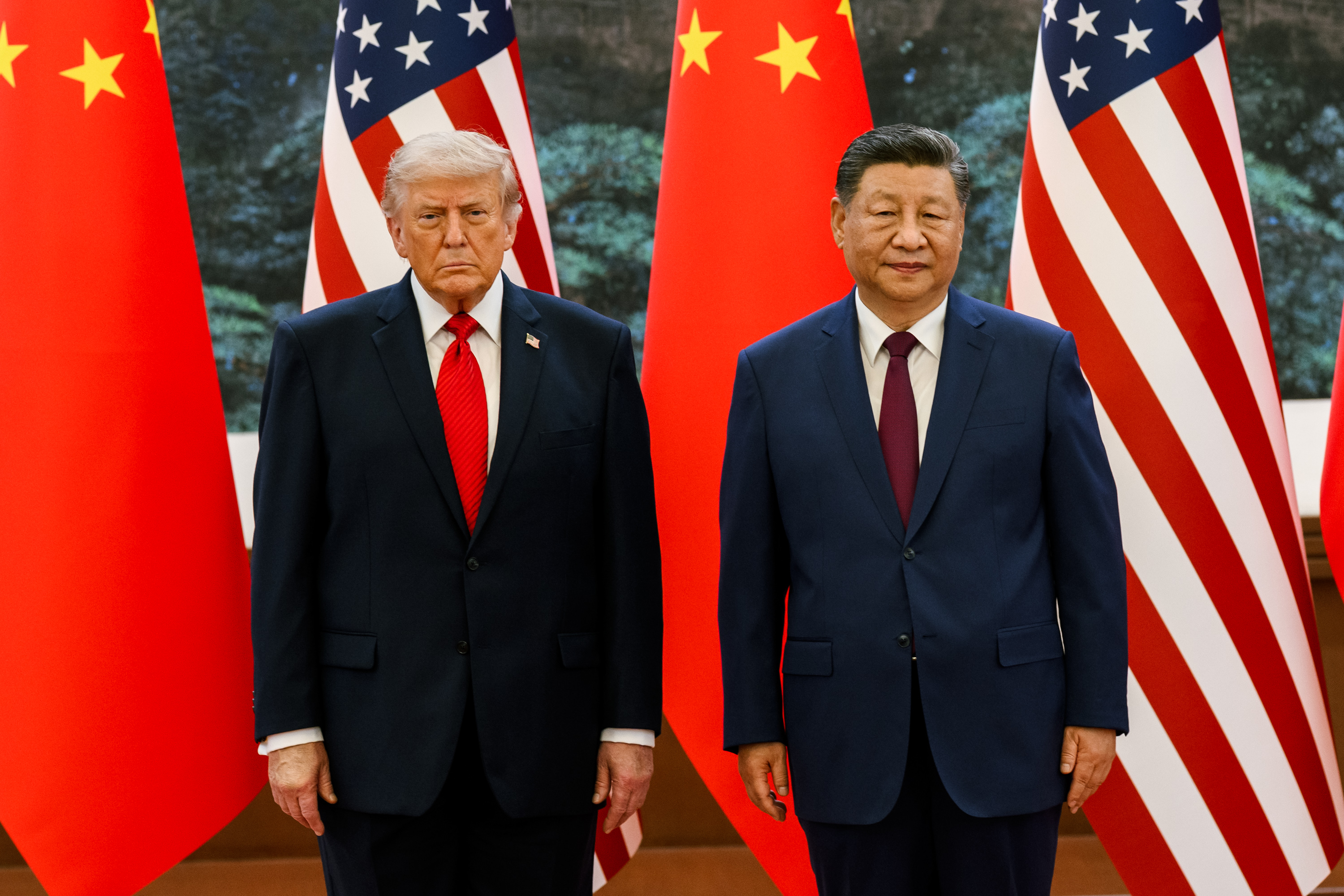
Xi Jinping and Donald Trump in 2026

- General secretaries of the Chinese Communist Party (complete list) and paramount leaders (complete list) –

- Xi Jinping, general secretary and paramount leader (since 15 November 2012)

- Presidents (complete list) –

- Xi Jinping, president (since 14 March 2013)

- Premiers (complete list) –

- Li Keqiang, premier (15 March 2013 – 11 March 2023)
- Li Qiang, premier (since 11 March 2023)

- Japan

Sanae Takaichi in 2025

- Emperors (complete list) –

- Naruhito, emperor (since 1 May 2019)

- Prime ministers (complete list) –

- Shinzo Abe, prime minister (26 December 2012 – 16 September 2020)
- Yoshihide Suga, prime minister (16 September 2020 – 4 October 2021)
- Fumio Kishida, prime minister (4 October 2021 – 1 October 2024)
- Shigeru Ishiba, prime minister (1 October 2024 – 21 October 2025)
- Sanae Takaichi, prime minister (since 21 October 2025)

- North Korea

Kim Jong-un in 2025

- Leaders of the Workers' Party of Korea (complete list) –

- Kim Jong Un, chairman (9 May 2016 – 10 January 2021); general secretary (since 10 January 2021)

- President of the State Affairs Commission (complete list)

- Kim Jong Un, president of the State Affairs Commission (since 29 June 2016) (Note: Kim Jong Un was not head of state until a constitutional amendment replaced the President of the Presidium of the Supreme People's Assembly with the President of the State Affairs Commission as the head of state of North Korea on 11 April 2019.)

- Premiers (complete list) –

- Kim Jae-ryong, premier (11 April 2019 – 13 August 2020)
- Kim Tok-hun, premier (13 August 2020 – 29 December 2024)
- Pak Thae-song, premier (since 29 December 2024)

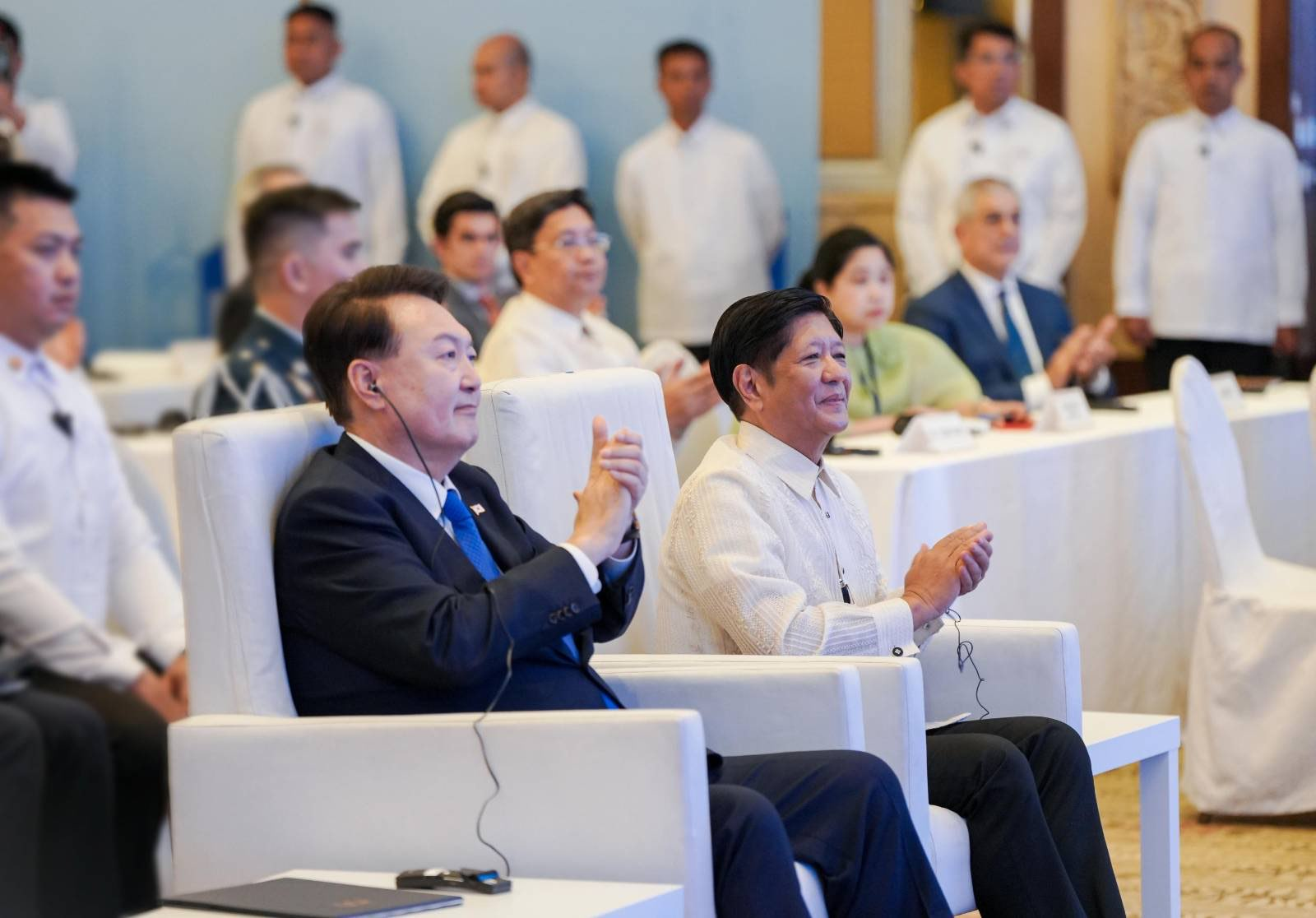
Yoon Suk Yeol and Bongbong Marcos in 2022

- South Korea

- Presidents (complete list) –

- Moon Jae-in, president (10 May 2017 – 10 May 2022)
- Yoon Suk Yeol, president (10 May 2022 – 4 April 2025)
- Han Duck-soo, acting president (14 December 2024 – 27 December 2024, 24 March 2025 – 1 May 2025)
- Choi Sang-mok, acting president (27 December 2024 – 24 March 2025)
- Lee Ju-ho, acting president (2 May 2025 – 4 June 2025)
- Lee Jae Myung, president (since 4 June 2025)

- Prime ministers (complete list) –

- Lee Nak-yon, prime minister (31 May 2017 – 14 January 2020)
- Chung Sye-kyun, prime minister (14 January 2020 – 16 April 2021)
- Hong Nam-ki, acting prime minister (16 April 2021 – 13 May 2021)
- Kim Boo-kyum, prime minister (14 May 2021 – 11 May 2022)
- Choo Kyung-ho, acting prime minister (12 May 2022 – 20 May 2022)
- Han Duck-soo, prime minister (21 May 2022 – 1 May 2025)
- Choi Sang-mok, acting prime minister (27 December 2024 – 24 March 2025)
- Lee Ju-ho, acting prime minister (2 May 2025 – 3 July 2025)
- Kim Min-seok, prime minister (3 July 2025 – 30 June 2026)
- Han Seong-sook, prime minister (since 1 July 2026)

- Mongolia

- Presidents (complete list) –

- Khaltmaagiin Battulga, president (10 July 2017 – 25 June 2021)
- Ukhnaagiin Khürelsükh, president (25 June 2021 – 19 November 2026)
- Sandagiin Byambatsogt, acting president (since 19 November 2026)

- Prime ministers (complete list) –

- Ukhnaagiin Khürelsükh, prime minister (4 October 2017 – 27 January 2021)
- Luvsannamsrain Oyun-Erdene, prime minister (27 January 2021 – 13 June 2025)
- Gombojavyn Zandanshatar, prime minister (13 June 2025 – 30 March 2026)
- Nyam-Osoryn Uchral, prime minister (since 30 March 2026)

- Taiwan

- Presidents (complete list) –

- Tsai Ing-wen, president (20 May 2016 – 20 May 2024)
- Lai Ching-te, president (since 20 May 2024)

- Premiers (complete list) –

- Su Tseng-chang, premier (14 January 2019 – 31 January 2023)
- Chen Chien-jen, premier (31 January 2023 – 20 May 2024)
- Cho Jung-tai, premier (since 20 May 2024)

=== Asia: Southeast ===
- Brunei

- Sultans (complete list) –

- Hassanal Bolkiah, sultan (since 5 October 1967) (Note: Hassanal Bolkiah did not become a state leader until Brunei's independence on 1 January 1984.)

- Prime mimisters (complete list) –

- Hassanal Bolkiah, prime minister (since 1 January 1984)

- Cambodia

- President of the Cambodian People's Party (complete list) –

- Hun Sen, president (since 20 June 2015)

- Monarchs (complete list) –

- Norodom Sihamoni, king (since 14 October 2004)

- Prime ministers (complete list) –

- Hun Sen, prime minister (30 November 1998 – 22 August 2023)
- Hun Manet, prime minister (since 22 August 2023)

- Indonesia

- Presidents (complete list) –

- Joko Widodo, president (20 October 2014 – 20 October 2024)
- Prabowo Subianto, president (since 20 October 2024)

- Laos

- General secretaries of the Lao People's Revolutionary Party (complete list) –

- Bounnhang Vorachit, general secretary (22 January 2016 – 15 January 2021)
- Thongloun Sisoulith, general secretary (since 15 January 2021)

- Presidents (complete list) –

- Bounnhang Vorachit, president (20 April 2016 – 22 March 2021)
- Thongloun Sisoulith, president (since 22 March 2021)

- Prime ministers (complete list) –

- Thongloun Sisoulith, prime minister (20 April 2016 – 22 March 2021)
- Phankham Viphavanh, prime minister (22 March 2021 – 30 December 2022)
- Sonexay Siphandone, prime minister (30 December 2022 – 5 October 2026)
- Saleumxay Kommasith, prime minister (since 5 October 2026)

- Malaysia

- Monarchs (complete list) –

- Abdullah, king (31 January 2019 – 30 January 2024)
- Ibrahim Iskandar, king (since 31 January 2024)

- Prime ministers (complete list) –

- Mahathir Mohamad, prime minister (10 May 2018 – 24 February 2020); interim prime minister (24 February 2020 – 1 March 2020)
- Muhyiddin Yassin, prime minister (1 March 2020 – 16 August 2021); caretaker prime minister (16 August 2021 – 21 August 2021)
- Ismail Sabri Yaakob, prime minister (21 August 2021 – 24 November 2022)
- Anwar Ibrahim, prime minister (since 24 November 2022)

- Myanmar

- Presidents (complete list) –

- Win Myint, president (30 March 2018 – 1 February 2021)
- Myint Swe, acting president (1 February 2021 – 7 August 2025)
- Min Aung Hlaing, acting president (since 22 July 2024)

- State counsellors (complete list) –

- Aung San Suu Kyi, state counsellor (6 April 2016 – 1 February 2021)

- Chairmen of the State Administration Council (complete list) –

- Min Aung Hlaing, chairman (2 February 2021 – 31 July 2025)

- Prime ministers (complete list) –

- Min Aung Hlaing, prime minister (1 August 2021 – 31 July 2025)
- Nyo Saw, prime minister (since 31 July 2025)

- Chairmen of the State Security and Peace Commission (complete list) –

- Min Aung Hlaing, chairman (since 31 July 2025)

- Philippines

- Presidents (complete list) –

- Rodrigo Duterte, president (30 June 2016 – 30 June 2022)
- Bongbong Marcos, president (since 30 June 2022)

- Singapore

- Presidents (complete list) –

- Halimah Yacob, president (14 September 2017 – 14 September 2023)
- Tharman Shanmugaratnam, president (since 14 September 2023)

- Prime ministers (complete list) –

- Lee Hsien Loong, prime minister (12 August 2004 – 15 May 2024)
- Lawrence Wong, prime minister (since 15 May 2024)

- Thailand

- Monarchs (complete list) –

- Vajiralongkorn, King (since 13 October 2016)

- Prime ministers (complete list) –

- Prayut Chan-o-cha, prime minister (24 August 2014 – 22 August 2023)
- Prawit Wongsuwon, acting prime minister (24 August 2022 – 30 September 2022)
- Srettha Thavisin, prime minister (22 August 2023 – 14 August 2024)
- Phumtham Wechayachai, acting prime minister (14 August 2024 – 16 August 2024, 3 July 2025 – 7 September 2025)
- Paetongtarn Shinawatra, prime minister (16 August 2024 – 29 August 2025)
- Suriya Juangroongruangkit, acting prime minister (1 July 2025 – 3 July 2025)
- Anutin Charnvirakul, prime minister (since 7 September 2025)

- Timor-Leste

- Presidents (complete list) –

- Francisco Guterres, president (20 May 2017 – 20 May 2022)
- José Ramos-Horta, president (since 20 May 2022)

- Prime ministers (complete list) –

- Taur Matan Ruak, prime minister (22 June 2018 – 1 July 2023)
- Xanana Gusmão, prime minister (since 1 July 2023)

- Vietnam

- General secretaries of the Communist Party of Vietnam (complete list) –

- Nguyễn Phú Trọng, general secretary (19 January 2011 – 19 July 2024)
- Tô Lâm, acting general secretary (19 July 2024 – 3 August 2024); general secretary (since 3 August 2024)

- Presidents (complete list) –

- Nguyễn Phú Trọng, president (23 October 2018 – 5 April 2021)
- Nguyễn Xuân Phúc, president (5 April 2021 – 18 January 2023)
- Võ Thị Ánh Xuân, acting president (18 January 2023 – 2 March 2023, 21 March 2024 – 22 May 2024)
- Võ Văn Thưởng, president (2 March 2023 – 21 March 2024)
- Tô Lâm, president (22 May 2024 – 21 October 2024, since 7 April 2026)
- Lương Cường, president (21 October 2024 – 7 April 2026)

- Prime ministers (complete list) –

- Nguyễn Xuân Phúc, prime minister (7 April 2016 – 5 April 2021)
- Phạm Minh Chính, prime minister (5 April 2021 – 7 April 2026)
- Lê Minh Hưng, prime minister (since 7 April 2026)

=== Asia: South ===
- Afghanistan

- Presidents (complete list) –

- Ashraf Ghani, president (29 September 2014 – 15 August 2021)

- Chief executives (complete list) –

- Abdullah Abdullah, chief executive (29 September 2014 – 9 March 2020)

- Supreme leaders (complete list) –

- Hibatullah Akhundzada, supreme leader (since 15 August 2021)

- Prime ministers (complete list) –

- Hasan Akhund, acting prime minister (7 September 2021 – 19 August 2025); prime minister (since 19 August 2025)
- Abdul Kabir, acting prime minister (17 May 2023 – 17 July 2023)

- Bangladesh

- Presidents (complete list) –

- Mohammad Abdul Hamid, president (24 April 2013 – 24 April 2023)
- Mohammed Shahabuddin, president (24 April 2023 – 24 July 2026)
- Hafiz Uddin Ahmad, acting president (24 July 2026 – 21 August 2026)
- Mirza Fakhrul Islam Alamgir, president (since 21 August 2026)

- Prime ministers (complete list) –

- Sheikh Hasina, prime minister (6 January 2009 – 5 August 2024)
- Tarique Rahman, prime minister (since 17 February 2026)

- Chief advisers (complete list) –

- Muhammad Yunus, chief adviser (8 August 2024 – 17 February 2026)

- Bhutan

- Monarchs (complete list) –

- Jigme Khesar Namgyel Wangchuck, king (since 9 December 2006)

- Heads of government (complete list) –

- Lotay Tshering, prime minister (7 November 2018 – 1 November 2023)
- Chogyal Dago Rigdzin, chief advisor (1 November 2023 – 28 January 2024)
- Tshering Tobgay, prime minister (since 28 January 2024)

- India

- Presidents (complete list) –

- Ram Nath Kovind, president (25 July 2017 – 25 July 2022)
- Droupadi Murmu, president (since 25 July 2022)

- Prime ministers (complete list) –

- Narendra Modi, prime minister (since 26 May 2014)

- Iran

- Supreme leaders (complete list) –

- Ali Khamenei, supreme leader (6 August 1989 – 28 February 2026)
- Mojtaba Khamenei, supreme leader (since March 8, 2026)

- Presidents (complete list) –

- Hassan Rouhani, president (3 August 2013 – 3 August 2021)
- Ebrahim Raisi, president (3 August 2021 – 19 May 2024)
- Mohammad Mokhber, acting president (19 May 2024 – 28 July 2024)
- Masoud Pezeshkian, president (since 28 July 2024)

- Maldives

- Presidents (complete list) –

- Ibrahim Mohamed Solih, president (17 November 2018 – 17 November 2023)
- Mohamed Muizzu, president (since 17 November 2023)

- Nepal

- Presidents (complete list) –

- Bidya Devi Bhandari, president (29 October 2015 – 13 March 2023)
- Ram Chandra Poudel, president (since 13 March 2023)

- Prime ministers (complete list) –

- K. P. Sharma Oli, prime minister (15 February 2018 – 13 July 2021, 15 July 2024 – 9 September 2025)
- Sher Bahadur Deuba, prime minister (13 July 2021 – 26 December 2022)
- Pushpa Kamal Dahal, prime minister (26 December 2022 – 15 July 2024)
- Sushila Karki, interim prime minister (12 September 2025 – 27 March 2026)
- Balendra Shah, prime minister (since 27 March 2026)

- Pakistan

- Presidents (complete list) –

- Arif Alvi, president (9 September 2018 – 10 March 2024)
- Asif Ali Zardari, president (since 10 March 2024)

- Prime ministers (complete list) –

- Imran Khan, prime minister (18 August 2018 – 10 April 2022)
- Shehbaz Sharif, prime minister (11 April 2022 – 14 August 2023, since 4 March 2024)
- Anwaar ul Haq Kakar, caretaker prime minister (14 August 2023 – 4 March 2024)

- Sri Lanka

- Presidents (complete list) –

- Gotabaya Rajapaksa, president (18 November 2019 – 14 July 2022)
- Ranil Wickremesinghe, acting president (14 July 2022 – 21 July 2022); president (21 July 2022 – 23 September 2024)
- Anura Kumara Dissanayake, president (since 23 September 2024)

- Prime ministers (complete list) –

- Mahinda Rajapaksa, prime minister (21 November 2019 – 9 May 2022)
- Ranil Wickremesinghe, prime minister (12 May 2022 – 21 July 2022)
- Dinesh Gunawardena, prime minister (22 July 2022 – 23 September 2024)
- Harini Amarasuriya, prime minister (since 24 September 2024)

=== Asia: West ===
- Abkhazia

- Presidents (complete list) –

- Raul Khajimba, president (25 September 2014 – 12 January 2020)
- Valeri Bganba, acting president (13 January 2020 – 23 April 2020)
- Aslan Bzhania, president (23 April 2020 – 19 November 2024)
- Badra Gunba, acting president (19 November 2024 – 2 April 2025); president (since 2 April 2025)

- Prime ministers (complete list) –

- Valeri Bganba, prime minister (18 September 2018 – 23 April 2020); acting prime minister (18 November 2024 – 3 March 2025)
- Alexander Ankvab, prime minister (23 April 2020 – 18 November 2024)
- Vladimir Delba, acting prime minister (3 March 2025 – 3 April 2025); prime minister (since 3 April 2025)

- Armenia

- Presidents (complete list) –

- Armen Sarkissian, president (9 April 2018 – 1 February 2022)
- Alen Simonyan, acting president (1 February 2022 – 13 March 2022)
- Vahagn Khachaturyan, president (since 13 March 2022)

- Prime ministers (complete list) –

- Nikol Pashinyan, prime minister (since 8 May 2018)

- Artsakh

- Presidents (complete list) –

- Bako Sahakyan, president (7 September 2007 – 21 May 2020)
- Arayik Harutyunyan, president (21 May 2020 – 1 September 2023)
- Davit Ishkhanyan, acting president (1 September 2023 – 10 September 2023)
- Samvel Shahramanyan, president (10 September 2023 – 1 January 2024)

- Azerbaijan

- Presidents (complete list) –

- Ilham Aliyev, president (since 31 October 2003)

- Prime ministers (complete list) –

- Ali Asadov, prime minister (since 8 October 2019)

- Bahrain

- Monarchs (complete list) –

- Hamad bin Isa Al Khalifa, king (since 14 February 2002)

- Prime ministers (complete list) –

- Khalifa bin Salman Al Khalifa, prime minister (10 January 1970 – 11 November 2020)
- Salman bin Hamad Al Khalifa, prime minister (since 11 November 2020)

- Cyprus

- Presidents (complete list) –

- Nicos Anastasiades, president (28 February 2013 – 28 February 2023)
- Nikos Christodoulides, president (since 28 February 2023)

- Northern Cyprus

- Presidents (complete list) –

- Mustafa Akıncı, president (30 April 2015 – 23 October 2020)
- Ersin Tatar, president (23 October 2020 – 23 October 2025)
- Tufan Erhürman, president (since 23 October 2025)

- Prime ministers (complete list) –

- Ersin Tatar, prime minister (22 May 2019 – 23 October 2020)
- Ersan Saner, prime minister (9 December 2020 – 5 November 2021)
- Faiz Sucuoğlu, prime minister (5 November 2021 – 12 May 2022)
- Ünal Üstel, prime minister (since 12 May 2022)

- Georgia

- Honorary chairmen of Georgian Dream –

- Bidzina Ivanishvili, honorary chairman (since 30 December 2023)

- Presidents (complete list) –

- Salome Zourabichvili, president (since 16 December 2018, disputed with Mikheil Kavelashvili since 29 December 2024)
- Mikheil Kavelashvili, president (since 29 December 2024, disputed with Salome Zourabichvili)

- Heads of government (complete list) –

- Giorgi Gakharia, prime minister (8 September 2019 – 18 February 2021)
- Maya Tskitishvili, acting prime minister (18 February 2021 – 22 February 2021)
- Irakli Garibashvili, prime minister (22 February 2021 – 8 February 2024)
- Irakli Kobakhidze, prime minister (since 8 February 2024)

- Iraq

- Presidents (complete list) –

- Barham Salih, president (2 October 2018 – 17 October 2022)
- Abdul Latif Rashid, president (17 October 2022 – 12 April 2026)
- Nizar Amidi, president (since 12 April 2026)

- Prime ministers (complete list) –

- Adil Abdul-Mahdi, prime minister (25 October 2018 – 7 May 2020)
- Mustafa Al-Kadhimi, prime minister (7 May 2020 – 27 October 2022)
- Mohammed Shia' al-Sudani, prime minister (27 October 2022 – 14 May 2026)
- Ali al-Zaidi, prime minister (since 14 May 2026)

- Israel

- Presidents (complete list) –

- Reuven Rivlin, president (24 July 2014 – 7 July 2021)
- Isaac Herzog, president (since 7 July 2021)

- Prime ministers (complete list) –

- Benjamin Netanyahu, caretaker prime minister (9 April 2019 – 17 May 2020); prime minister (17 May 2020 – 13 June 2021, since 29 December 2022)
- Naftali Bennett, prime minister (13 June 2021 – 30 June 2022)
- Yair Lapid, prime minister (1 July 2022 – 29 December 2022)

- Jordan

- Monarchs (complete list) –

- Abdullah II, king (since 7 February 1999)

- Prime ministers (complete list) –

- Omar Razzaz, prime minister (14 June 2018 – 12 October 2020)
- Bisher Khasawneh, prime minister (12 October 2020 – 15 September 2024)
- Jafar Hassan, prime minister (since 15 September 2024)

- Kuwait

- Emirs (complete list) –

- Sabah Al-Ahmad Al-Jaber Al-Sabah, emir (24 January 2006 – 29 September 2020)
- Nawaf Al-Ahmad Al-Jaber Al-Sabah, emir (29 September 2020 – 16 December 2023)
- Mishal Al-Ahmad Al-Jaber Al-Sabah, emir (since 16 December 2023)

- Prime ministers (complete list) –

- Sabah Al-Khalid Al-Sabah, prime minister (19 November 2019 – 24 July 2022)
- Ahmad Nawaf Al-Ahmad Al-Sabah, prime minister (24 July 2022 – 17 January 2024)
- Mohammad Sabah Al-Salem Al-Sabah, prime minister (17 January 2024 – 15 May 2024)
- Ahmad Al-Abdullah Al-Sabah, prime minister (since 15 May 2024)

- Lebanon

- Presidents (complete list) –

- Michel Aoun, president (31 October 2016 – 31 October 2022)
- Najib Mikati, acting president (31 October 2022 – 9 January 2025)
- Joseph Aoun, president (since 9 January 2025)

- Prime ministers (complete list) –

- Saad Hariri, prime minister (18 December 2016 – 21 January 2020)
- Hassan Diab, prime minister (21 January 2020 – 10 August 2020); caretaker prime minister (10 August 2020 – 10 September 2021)
- Najib Mikati, prime minister (10 September 2021 – 8 February 2025)
- Nawaf Salam, prime minister (since 8 February 2025)

- Oman

- Sultans (complete list) –

- Qaboos bin Said, sultan (23 July 1970 – 10 January 2020)
- Haitham bin Tariq, sultan (since 11 January 2020)

- Prime ministers (complete list) –

- Qaboos bin Said, prime minister (2 January 1972 – 10 January 2020)
- Haitham bin Tariq, prime minister (since 11 January 2020)

- Palestine

- Presidents (complete list) –

- Mahmoud Abbas, president (since 23 November 2008)

- Prime ministers (complete list) –

- Mohammad Shtayyeh, prime minister (14 April 2019 – 31 March 2024)
- Mohammad Mustafa, prime minister (since 31 March 2024)

- Qatar

- Emirs (complete list) –

- Tamim bin Hamad Al Thani, emir (since 25 June 2013)

- Prime ministers (complete list) –

- Abdullah bin Nasser Al Thani, prime minister (26 June 2013 – 28 January 2020)
- Khalid bin Khalifa bin Abdul Aziz Al Thani, prime minister (28 January 2020 – 7 March 2023)
- Mohammed bin Abdulrahman bin Jassim Al Thani, prime minister (since 7 March 2023)

- Saudi Arabia

- Monarchs (complete list) –

- Salman, king (since 23 January 2015)

- Prime minister (complete list) –

- Salman, prime minister (23 January 2015 – 27 September 2022)
- Mohammed bin Salman, prime minister (since 27 September 2022)

- South Ossetia

- Presidents (complete list) –

- Anatoly Bibilov, president (21 April 2017 – 24 May 2022)
- Alan Gagloev, president (24 May 2022 – 23 June 2026)
- Marat Kambolov, president (since 23 June 2026)

- Prime ministers (complete list) –

- Erik Pukhayev, prime minister (16 May 2017 – 29 August 2020)
- Gennady Bekoyev, acting prime minister (29 August 2020 – 20 June 2022)
- Konstantin Dzhussoev, prime minister (20 June 2022 – 21 January 2026)
- Dzambolat Tadtaev, prime minister (21 January 2026 – 8 June 2026)
- Konstantin Dzhioyev, acting prime minister (8 June 2026 – 16 June 2026)
- Marat Kambolov, prime minister (16 June 2026 – 30 September 2026)
- Soslan Margiev, prime minister (since 22 October 2026)

- Syria

- Heads of state (complete list) –

- Bashar al-Assad, president (17 July 2000 – 8 December 2024)
- Ahmed al-Sharaa, de facto leader (8 December 2024 – 29 January 2025); president (since 29 January 2025)

- Prime ministers (complete list) –

- Imad Khamis, prime minister (3 July 2016 – 11 June 2020)
- Hussein Arnous, acting prime minister (11 June 2020 – 2 September 2020); prime minister (2 September 2020 – 14 September 2024)
- Mohammad Ghazi al-Jalali, prime minister (14 September 2024 – 8 December 2024); acting prime minister (8 December 2024 – 10 December 2024)
- Mohammed al-Bashir, prime minister (10 December 2024 – 29 March 2025)

- Turkey

- Presidents (complete list) –

- Recep Tayyip Erdoğan, president (since 28 August 2014)

- United Arab Emirates

- Presidents (complete list) –

- Khalifa bin Zayed Al Nahyan, president (3 November 2004 – 13 May 2022)
- Mohammed bin Rashid Al Maktoum, acting president (13 May 2022 – 14 May 2022)
- Mohamed bin Zayed Al Nahyan, president (since 14 May 2022)

- Prime ministers (complete list) –

- Mohammed bin Rashid Al Maktoum, prime minister (since 11 February 2006)

- Yemen

- Heads of state (complete list) –

- Abdrabbuh Mansour Hadi, president (25 February 2012 – 7 April 2022)
- Rashad al-Alimi, chairman of the Presidential Leadership Council (since 7 April 2022)

- Prime ministers (complete list) –

- Maeen Abdulmalik Saeed, prime minister (15 October 2018 – 5 February 2024)
- Ahmad Awad bin Mubarak, prime minister (5 February 2024 – 3 May 2025)
- Salem Saleh bin Braik, prime minister (3 May 2025 – 15 January 2026)
- Shaea al-Zindani, prime minister (since 15 January 2026)

== Europe ==
=== Europe: East ===
- Belarus

- Chairmen of the All-Belarusian People's Assembly –

- Alexander Lukashenko, chairman (since 24 April 2024)

- Presidents (complete list) –

- Alexander Lukashenko, president (since 20 July 1994)

- Prime ministers (complete list) –

- Syarhey Rumas, prime minister (18 August 2018 – 3 June 2020)
- Roman Golovchenko, prime minister (4 June 2020 – 10 March 2025)
- Alexander Turchin, prime minister (since 10 March 2025)

- Bulgaria

- Presidents (complete list) –

- Rumen Radev, president (22 January 2017 – 23 January 2026)
- Iliana Iotova, president (since 23 January 2026)

- Prime ministers (complete list) –

- Boyko Borisov, prime minister (4 May 2017 – 12 May 2021)
- Stefan Yanev, prime minister (12 May 2021 – 13 December 2021)
- Kiril Petkov, prime minister (13 December 2021 – 2 August 2022)
- Galab Donev, prime minister (2 August 2022 – 6 June 2023)
- Nikolai Denkov, prime minister (6 June 2023 – 9 April 2024)
- Dimitar Glavchev, acting prime minister (9 April 2024 – 16 January 2025)
- Rosen Zhelyazkov, prime minister (16 January 2025 – 19 February 2026)
- Andrey Gyurov, acting prime minister (19 February 2026 – 8 May 2026)
- Rumen Radev, prime minister (since 8 May 2026)

- Czech Republic

- Presidents (complete list) –

- Miloš Zeman, president (8 March 2013 – 8 March 2023)
- Petr Pavel, president (since 9 March 2023)

- Prime ministers (complete list) –

- Andrej Babiš, prime minister (6 December 2017 – 28 November 2021)
- Petr Fiala, prime minister (28 November 2021 – 15 December 2025)
- Andrej Babiš, prime minister (since 9 December 2025)

- Donetsk People's Republic

- Heads (complete list) –

- Denis Pushilin, head (20 November 2018 – 30 September 2022)

- Prime ministers (complete list) –

- Alexander Ananchenko, prime minister (1 December 2018 – 8 June 2022)
- Vitaliy Khotsenko, prime minister (8 June 2022 – 30 September 2022)

- Hungary

- Presidents (complete list) –

- János Áder, president (10 May 2012 – 10 May 2022)
- Katalin Novák, president (10 May 2022 – 26 February 2024)
- László Kövér, acting president (26 February 2024 – 5 March 2024)
- Tamás Sulyok, president (5 March 2024 – 20 July 2026)
- Ágnes Forsthoffer, acting president (20 July 2026 – 19 August 2026)
- András Baka, president (since 19 August 2026)

- Prime ministers (complete list) –

- Viktor Orbán, prime minister (29 May 2010 – 9 May 2026)
- Péter Magyar, prime minister (since 9 May 2026)

- Luhansk People's Republic

- Heads (complete list) –

- Leonid Pasechnik, head (21 November 2018 – 30 September 2022)

- Prime ministers (complete list) –

- Sergey Kozlov, prime minister (26 December 2015 – 30 September 2022)

- Moldova

- Presidents (complete list) –

- Igor Dodon, president (23 December 2016 – 24 December 2020)
- Maia Sandu, president (since 24 December 2020)

- Prime ministers (complete list) –

- Ion Chicu, prime minister (14 November 2019 – 31 December 2020)
- Aureliu Ciocoi, acting prime minister (31 December 2020 – 6 August 2021)
- Natalia Gavrilița, prime minister (6 August 2021 – 16 February 2023)
- Dorin Recean, prime minister (16 February 2023 – 1 November 2025)
- Alexandru Munteanu, prime minister (1 November 2025 – 8 July 2026)
- Eugen Osmochescu, acting prime minister (8 July 2026 – 22 July 2026)
- Vasile Tofan, prime minister (since 22 July 2026)

- Poland

- Presidents (complete list) –

- Andrzej Duda, president (6 August 2015 – 6 August 2025)
- Karol Nawrocki, president (since 6 August 2025)

- Prime ministers (complete list) –

- Mateusz Morawiecki, Prime minister (11 December 2017 – 13 December 2023)
- Donald Tusk, prime minister (since 13 December 2023)

- Romania

- Presidents (complete list) –

- Klaus Iohannis, president (21 December 2014 – 12 February 2025)
- Ilie Bolojan, acting president (12 February 2025 – 26 May 2025)
- Nicușor Dan, president (since 26 May 2025)

- Prime ministers (complete list) –

- Ludovic Orban, prime minister (4 November 2019 – 7 December 2020)
- Nicolae Ciucă, acting prime minister (7 December 2020 – 23 December 2020); prime minister (25 November 2021 – 12 June 2023)
- Florin Cîțu, prime minister (23 December 2020 – 25 November 2021)
- Cătălin Predoiu, acting prime minister (12 June 2023 – 15 June 2023, 6 May 2025 – 23 June 2025)
- Marcel Ciolacu, prime minister (15 June 2023 – 6 May 2025)
- Ilie Bolojan, prime minister (23 June 2025 – 20 September 2026)
- Luca Niculescu, prime minister (since 20 September 2026)

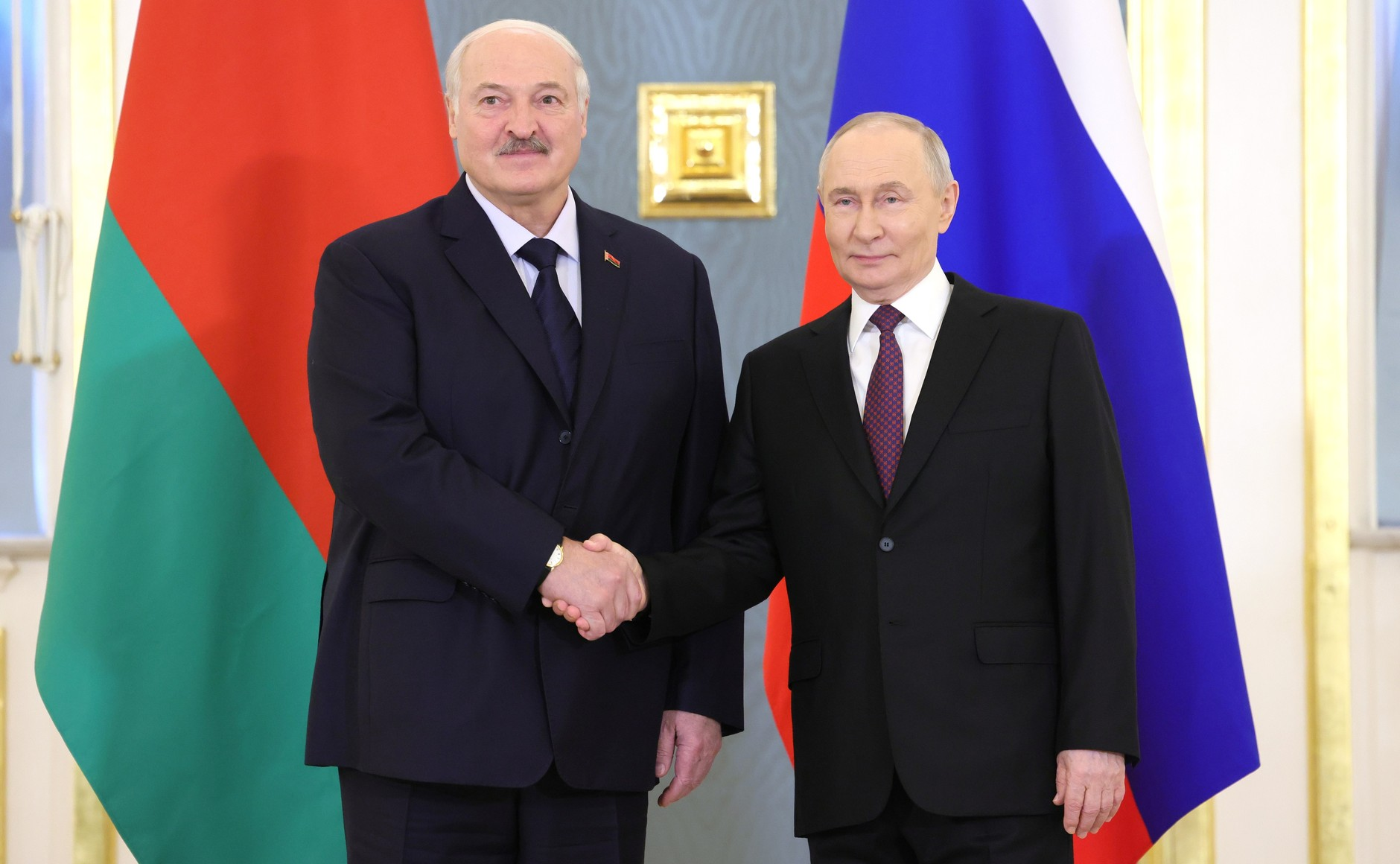
Vladimir Putin and Belarusian president Alexander Lukashenko in 2026

- Russia

- Presidents (complete list) –

- Vladimir Putin, president (since 7 May 2012)

- Prime ministers (complete list) –

- Dmitry Medvedev, prime minister (8 May 2012 – 16 January 2020)
- Mikhail Mishustin, prime minister (16 January 2020 – 30 April 2020, since 19 May 2020)
- Andrey Belousov, acting prime minister (30 April 2020 – 19 May 2020)

- Slovakia

- Presidents (complete list) –

- Zuzana Čaputová, president (15 June 2019 – 15 June 2024)
- Peter Pellegrini, president (since 15 June 2024)

- Prime ministers (complete list) –

- Peter Pellegrini, prime minister (22 March 2018 – 21 March 2020)
- Igor Matovič, prime minister (21 March 2020 – 1 April 2021)
- Eduard Heger, prime minister (1 April 2021 – 15 May 2023)
- Ľudovít Ódor, prime minister (15 May 2023 – 25 October 2023)
- Robert Fico, prime minister (since 25 October 2023)

- Transnistria

- Presidents (complete list) –

- Vadim Krasnoselsky, president (since 16 December 2016)

- Prime ministers (complete list) –

- Aleksandr Martynov, prime minister (17 December 2016 – 26 May 2022)
- Stanislav Kasap, acting prime minister (26 May 2022 – 30 May 2022)
- Aleksandr Rozenberg, prime minister (since 30 May 2022)

Volodymyr Zelenskyy and U.S president Joe Biden in New York City in September 2024

- Ukraine

- Presidents (complete list) –

- Volodymyr Zelenskyy, president (since 20 May 2019)

- Prime ministers (complete list) –

- Oleksiy Honcharuk, prime minister (29 August 2019 – 4 March 2020)
- Denys Shmyhal, prime minister (4 March 2020 – 17 July 2025)
- Yulia Svyrydenko, prime minister (17 July 2025 – 16 July 2026)
- Serhii Koretskyi, prime minister (since 16 July 2026)

=== Europe: North ===
- Denmark

- Monarchs (complete list) –

- Margrethe II, queen (14 January 1972 – 14 January 2024)
- Frederik X, king (since 14 January 2024)

- Prime ministers (complete list) –

- Mette Frederiksen, prime minister (since 27 June 2019)

- Estonia

- Presidents (complete list) –

- Kersti Kaljulaid, president (10 October 2016 – 11 October 2021)
- Alar Karis, president (11 October 2021 – 12 October 2026)
- Ülle Madise, president (since 12 October 2026)

- Prime ministers (complete list) –

- Jüri Ratas, prime minister (23 November 2016 – 26 January 2021)
- Kaja Kallas, prime minister (26 January 2021 – 23 July 2024)
- Kristen Michal, prime minister (since 23 July 2024)

- Finland

- Presidents (complete list) –

- Sauli Niinistö, president (1 March 2012 – 1 March 2024)
- Alexander Stubb, president (since 1 March 2024)

- Prime ministers (complete list) –

- Sanna Marin, prime minister (10 December 2019 – 20 June 2023)
- Petteri Orpo, prime minister (since 20 June 2023)

- Iceland

- Presidents (complete list) –

- Guðni Th. Jóhannesson, president (1 August 2016 – 1 August 2024)
- Halla Tómasdóttir, president (since 1 August 2024)

- Prime ministers (complete list) –

- Katrín Jakobsdóttir, prime minister (30 November 2017 – 9 April 2024)
- Bjarni Benediktsson, prime minister (9 April 2024 – 21 December 2024)
- Kristrún Frostadóttir, prime minister (since 21 December 2024)

- Ireland

- Presidents (complete list) –

- Michael D. Higgins, president (11 November 2011 – 10 November 2025)
- Catherine Connolly, president (since 11 November 2025)

- Taoisigh (complete list) –

- Leo Varadkar, Taoiseach (14 June 2017 – 27 June 2020, 17 December 2022 – 9 April 2024)
- Micheál Martin, Taoiseach (27 June 2020 – 17 December 2022, since 23 January 2025)
- Simon Harris, Taoiseach (9 April 2024 – 23 January 2025)

- Latvia

- Presidents (complete list) –

- Egils Levits, president (8 July 2019 – 8 July 2023)
- Edgars Rinkēvičs, president (since 8 July 2023)

- Prime ministers (complete list) –

- Krišjānis Kariņš, prime minister (23 January 2019 – 15 September 2023)
- Evika Siliņa, prime minister (15 September 2023 – 28 May 2026)
- Andris Kulbergs, prime minister (since 28 May 2026)

- Lithuania

- Presidents (complete list) –

- Gitanas Nausėda, president (since 12 July 2019)

- Prime ministers (complete list) –

- Saulius Skvernelis, prime minister (13 December 2016 – 11 December 2020)
- Ingrida Šimonytė, prime minister (11 December 2020 – 12 December 2024)
- Gintautas Paluckas, prime minister (12 December 2024 – 4 August 2025)
- Rimantas Šadžius, acting prime minister (4 August 2025 – 25 September 2025)
- Inga Ruginienė, prime minister (25 September 2025 – 14 July 2026)
- Mindaugas Sinkevičius, prime minister (since 14 July 2026)

- Norway

- Monarchs (complete list) –

- Harald V, king (17 January 1991 – 28 August 2026)
- Haakon VIII, king (since 28 August 2026)

- Prime ministers (complete list) –

- Erna Solberg, prime minister (16 October 2013 – 14 October 2021)
- Jonas Gahr Støre, prime minister (since 14 October 2021)

- Sweden

- Monarchs (complete list) –

- Carl XVI Gustaf, king (since 15 September 1973)

- Prime ministers (complete list) –

- Stefan Löfven, prime minister (3 October 2014 – 30 November 2021)
- Magdalena Andersson, prime minister (30 November 2021 – 18 October 2022)
- Ulf Kristersson, prime minister (since 18 October 2022)

- United Kingdom

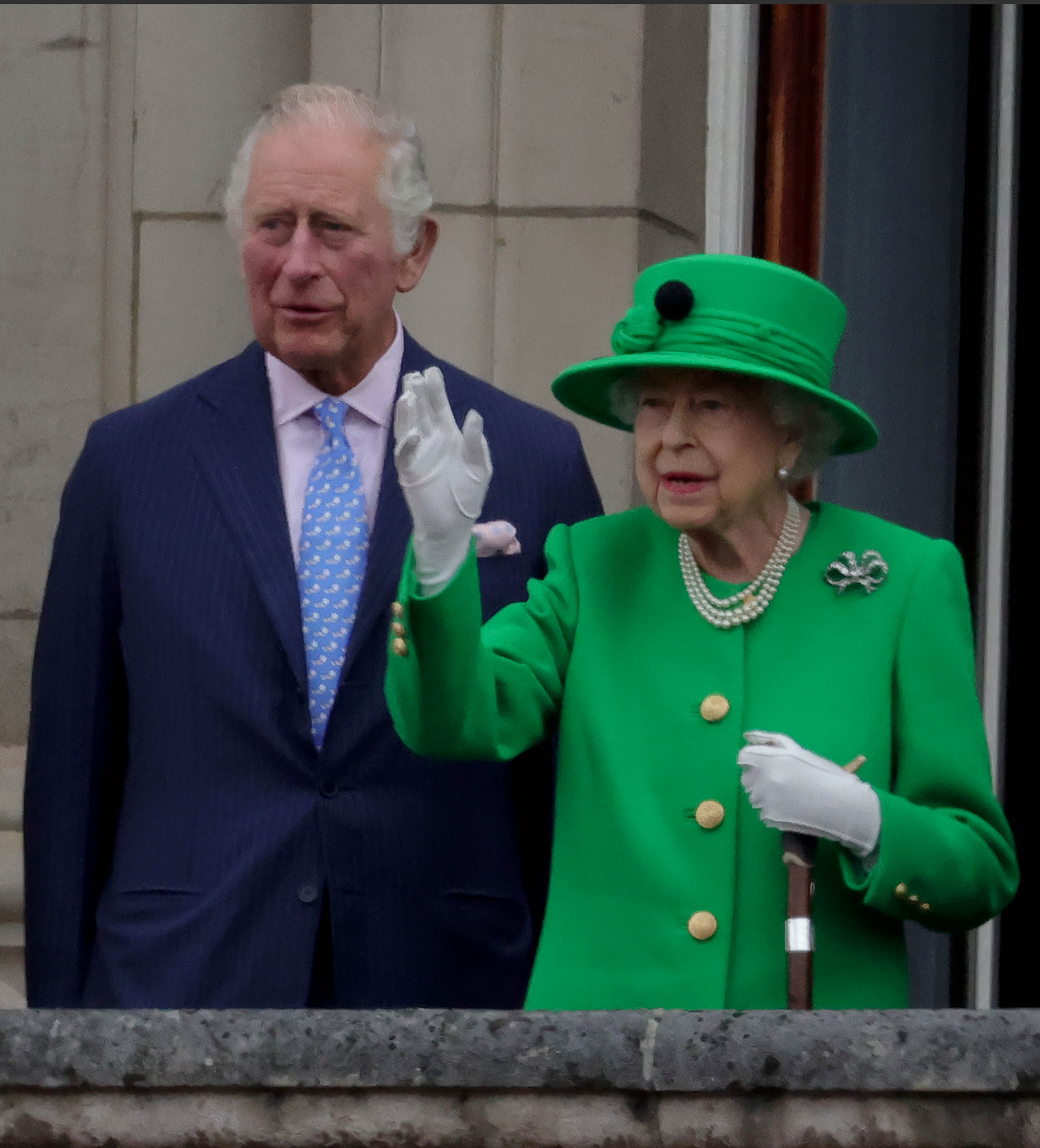
Queen Elizabeth II with then-Prince of Wales Charles in June 2022

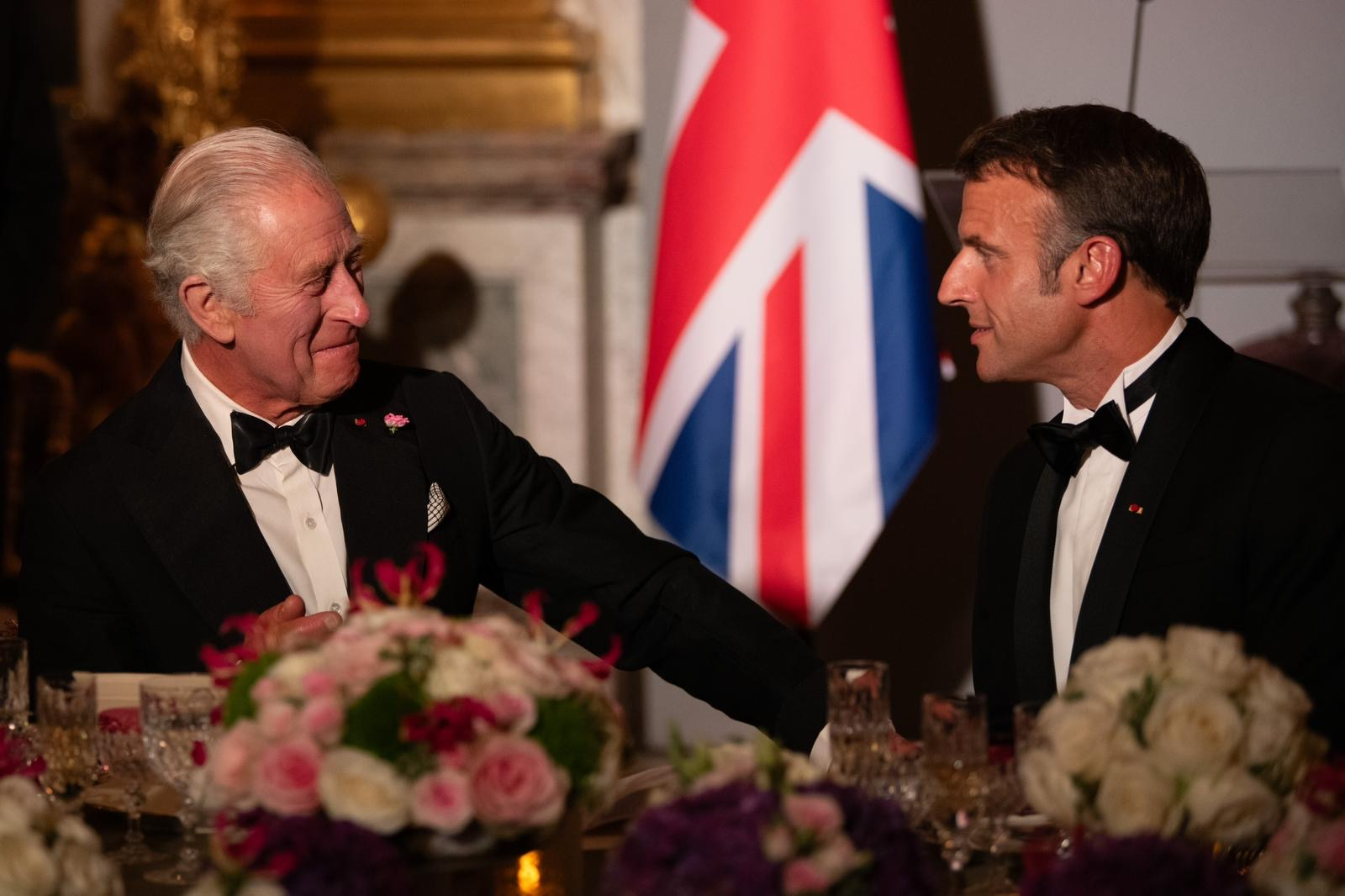
King Charles III and French president Emmanuel Macron in 2023

- Monarchs (complete list) –

- Elizabeth II, queen (6 February 1952 – 8 September 2022)
- Charles III, king (since 8 September 2022)

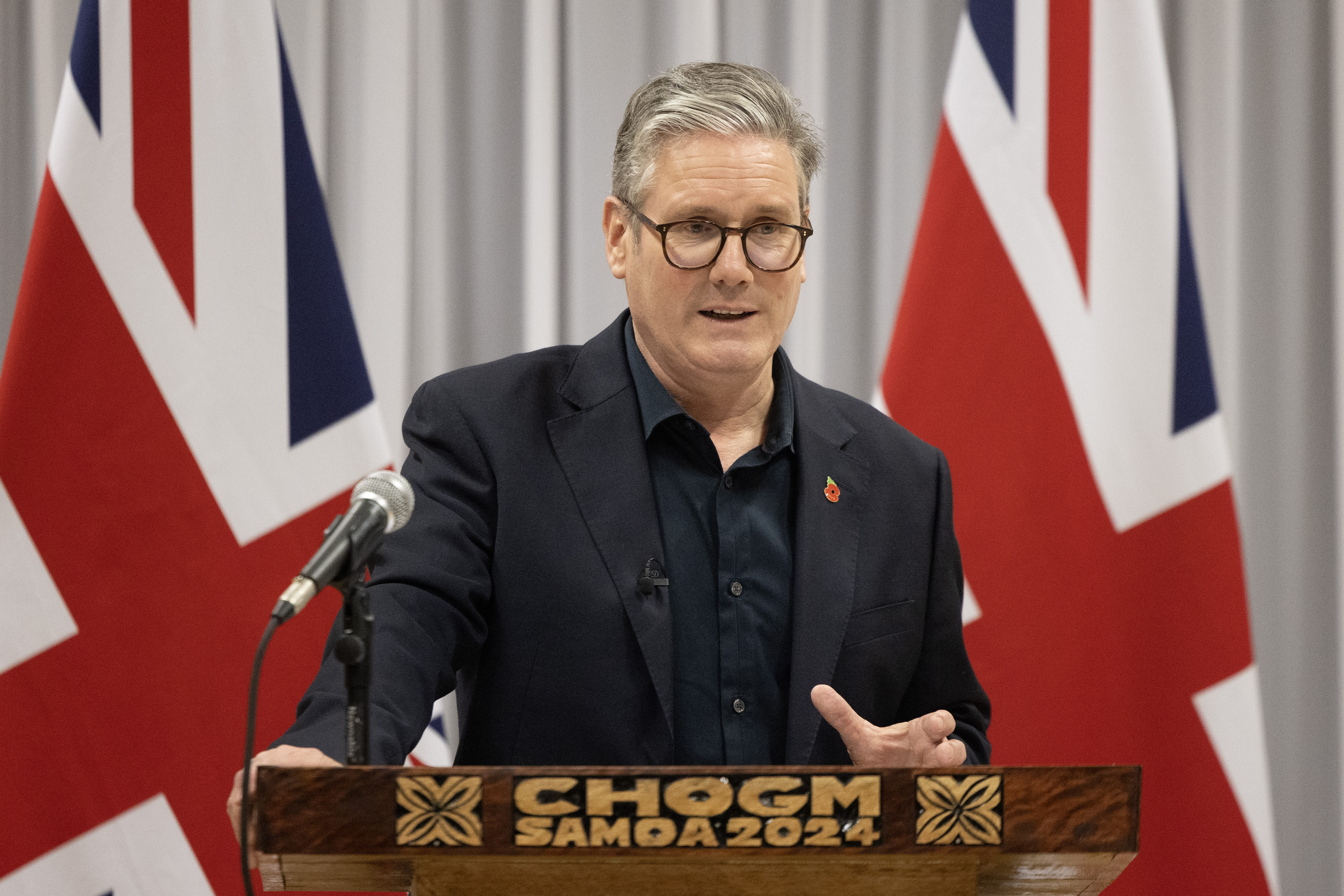
Keir Starmer in 2024

- Prime ministers (complete list) –

- Boris Johnson, prime minister (24 July 2019 – 6 September 2022)
- Liz Truss, prime minister (6 September 2022 – 25 October 2022)
- Rishi Sunak, prime minister (25 October 2022 – 5 July 2024)
- Keir Starmer, prime minister (5 July 2024 – 20 July 2026)
- Andy Burnham, prime minister (since 20 July 2026)

=== Europe: South ===
- Albania

- Presidents (complete list) –

- Ilir Meta, president (24 July 2017 – 24 July 2022)
- Bajram Begaj, president (since 24 July 2022)

- Prime ministers (complete list) –

- Edi Rama, prime minister (since 11 September 2013)

- Andorra

- Co-princes (complete list) –

- Joan Enric Vives i Sicília, episcopal co-prince (12 May 2003 – 31 May 2025)
- Josep-Lluís Serrano Pentinat, episcopal co-prince (since 31 May 2025)
- Emmanuel Macron, French co-prince (since 14 May 2017)

- Representatives of co-princes (complete list) –

- Josep Maria Mauri, representative of the episcopal co-prince (20 July 2012 – 27 November 2023)
- Eduard Ibáñez, representative of the episcopal co-prince (since 27 November 2023)
- Patrick Strzoda, representative of the French co-prince (14 May 2017 – 20 November 2024)
- Patrice Faure, representative of the French co-prince (since 20 November 2024)

- Prime ministers (complete list) –

- Xavier Espot Zamora, prime minister (since 16 May 2019)

- Bosnia and Herzegovina

- High representatives (complete list) –

- Valentin Inzko, high representative (26 March 2009 – 1 August 2021)
- Christian Schmidt, high representative (1 August 2021 – 1 July 2026)
- Louis Crishock, acting high representative (since 1 July 2026)

- Presidency (complete list) –

- Chairmen (complete list) –

- Željko Komšić, chairman (20 July 2019 – 20 March 2020, 20 July 2021 – 20 March 2022, 16 July 2023 – 16 March 2024, since 16 July 2025)
- Šefik Džaferović, chairman (20 March 2020 – 20 November 2020, 20 March 2022 – 16 November 2022)
- Milorad Dodik, chairman (20 November 2020 – 20 July 2021)
- Željka Cvijanović, chairwoman (16 November 2022 – 16 July 2023, 16 November 2024 – 16 July 2025)
- Denis Bećirović, chairman (16 March 2024 – 16 November 2024)

- Bosniak members (complete list) –

- Šefik Džaferović, member (20 November 2018 – 16 November 2022)
- Denis Bećirović, member (since 16 November 2022)

- Croat members (complete list) –

- Željko Komšić, member (since 20 November 2018)

- Serb members (complete list) –

- Milorad Dodik, member (20 November 2018 – 15 November 2022)
- Željka Cvijanović, member (since 16 November 2022)

- Chairmen of the Council of Ministers (complete list) –

- Zoran Tegeltija, chairman (23 December 2019 – 25 January 2023)
- Borjana Krišto, chairwoman (since 25 January 2023)

- Croatia

- Presidents (complete list) –

- Kolinda Grabar-Kitarović, president (19 February 2015 – 18 February 2020)
- Zoran Milanović, president (since 19 February 2020)

- Prime ministers (complete list) –

- Andrej Plenković, prime minister (since 19 October 2016)

- Greece

- Presidents (complete list) –

- Prokopis Pavlopoulos, president (13 March 2015 – 13 March 2020)
- Katerina Sakellaropoulou, president (13 March 2020 – 13 March 2025)
- Konstantinos Tasoulas, president (since 13 March 2025)

- Prime ministers (complete list) –

- Kyriakos Mitsotakis, prime minister (8 July 2019 – 24 May 2023, since 26 June 2023)
- Ioannis Sarmas, caretaker prime minister (25 May 2023 – 26 June 2023)

- Italy

- Presidents (complete list) –

- Sergio Mattarella, president (since 3 February 2015)

- Prime ministers (complete list) –

- Giuseppe Conte, prime minister (1 June 2018 – 13 February 2021)
- Mario Draghi, prime minister (13 February 2021 – 22 October 2022)
- Giorgia Meloni, prime minister (since 22 October 2022)

- Kosovo

- Presidents (complete list) –

- Hashim Thaçi, president (7 April 2016 – 5 November 2020)
- Vjosa Osmani, acting president (5 November 2020 – 22 March 2021); president (4 April 2021 – 4 April 2026)
- Glauk Konjufca, acting president (22 March 2021 – 4 April 2021)
- Albulena Haxhiu, acting president (4 April 2026 – 7 October 2026)
- Justina Shiroka Pula, president (since 7 October 2026)

- Prime ministers (complete list) –

- Ramush Haradinaj, prime minister (9 September 2017 – 3 February 2020)
- Albin Kurti, prime minister (3 February 2020 – 3 June 2020, 22 March 2021 – 23 March 2025); caretaker prime minister (since 23 March 2025)
- Avdullah Hoti, prime minister (3 June 2020 – 22 March 2021)

- Malta

- Presidents (complete list) –

- George Vella, president (4 April 2019 – 4 April 2024)
- Myriam Spiteri Debono, president (since 4 April 2024)

- Prime ministers (complete list) –

- Joseph Muscat, prime minister (11 March 2013 – 13 January 2020)
- Robert Abela, prime minister (since 13 January 2020)

- Montenegro

- Presidents (complete list) –

- Milo Đukanović, president (20 May 2018 – 20 May 2023)
- Jakov Milatović, president (since 20 May 2023)

- Prime ministers (complete list) –

- Duško Marković, prime minister (28 November 2016 – 4 December 2020)
- Zdravko Krivokapić, prime minister (4 December 2020 – 28 April 2022)
- Dritan Abazović, prime minister (28 April 2022 – 31 October 2023)
- Milojko Spajić, prime minister (since 31 October 2023)

- North Macedonia

- Presidents (complete list) –

- Stevo Pendarovski, president (12 May 2019 – 12 May 2024)
- Gordana Siljanovska-Davkova, president (since 12 May 2024)

- Prime ministers (complete list) –

- Zoran Zaev, prime minister (31 May 2017 – 3 January 2020, 30 August 2020 – 16 January 2022)
- Oliver Spasovski, acting prime minister (3 January 2020 – 30 August 2020)
- Dimitar Kovačevski, prime minister (16 January 2022 – 28 January 2024)
- Talat Xhaferi, acting prime minister (28 January 2024 – 23 June 2024)
- Hristijan Mickoski, prime minister (since 23 June 2024)

- Portugal

- Presidents (complete list) –

- Marcelo Rebelo de Sousa, president (9 March 2016 – 9 March 2026)
- António José Seguro, president (since 9 March 2026)

- Prime ministers (complete list) –

- António Costa, prime minister (26 November 2015 – 2 April 2024)
- Luís Montenegro, prime minister (since 2 April 2024)

- San Marino

- Captains Regent (complete list) –

- Luca Boschi and Mariella Mularoni, Captains Regent (1 October 2019 – 1 April 2020)
- Alessandro Mancini and Grazia Zafferani, Captains Regent (1 April 2020 – 1 October 2020)
- Alessandro Cardelli and Mirko Dolcini, Captains Regent (1 October 2020 – 1 April 2021)
- Gian Carlo Venturini and Marco Nicolini, Captains Regent (1 April 2021 – 1 October 2021)
- Francesco Mussoni and Giacomo Simoncini, Captains Regent (1 October 2021 – 1 April 2022)
- Oscar Mina and Paolo Rondelli, Captains Regent (1 April 2022 – 1 October 2022)
- Maria Luisa Berti and Manuel Ciavatta, Captains Regent (1 October 2022 – 1 April 2023)
- Alessandro Scarano and Adele Tonnini, Captains Regent (1 April 2023 – 1 October 2023)
- Filippo Tamagnini and Gaetano Troina, Captains Regent (1 October 2023 – 1 April 2024)
- Alessandro Rossi and Milena Gasperoni, Captains Regent (1 April 2024 – 1 October 2024)
- Francesca Civerchia and Dalibor Riccardi, Captains Regent (1 October 2024 – 1 April 2025)
- Denise Bronzetti and Italo Righi, Captains Regent (1 April 2025 – 1 October 2025)
- Matteo Rossi and Lorenzo Bugli, Captains Regent (1 October 2025 – 1 April 2026)
- Alice Mina and Vladimiro Selva, Captains Regent (1 April 2026 – 1 October 2026)
- Gerardo Giovagnoli and William Casali, Captains Regent (since 1 October 2026)

- Secretaries for Foreign and Political Affaris (complete list) –

- Nicola Renzi, secretary (27 December 2016 – 8 January 2020)
- Luca Beccari, secretary (since 8 January 2020)

- Serbia

- Presidents (complete list) –

- Aleksandar Vučić, president (31 May 2017 – 27 September 2026)
- Ana Brnabić, acting president (27 September 2026 – 17 November 2026)
- Aleksandar Čupić, acting president (since 19 November 2026)

- Prime ministers (complete list) –

- Ana Brnabić, prime minister (29 June 2017 – 6 February 2024)
- Ivica Dačić, acting prime minister (6 February 2024 – 2 May 2024)
- Miloš Vučević, prime minister (2 May 2024 – 16 April 2025)
- Đuro Macut, prime minister (since 16 April 2025)

- Slovenia

- Presidents (complete list) –

- Borut Pahor, president (22 December 2012 – 22 December 2022)
- Nataša Pirc Musar, president (since 23 December 2022)

- Prime ministers (complete list) –

- Marjan Šarec, prime minister (13 September 2018 – 3 March 2020)
- Janez Janša, prime minister (3 March 2020 – 1 June 2022)
- Robert Golob, prime minister (1 June 2022 – 4 June 2026)
- Janez Janša, prime minister (since 4 June 2026)

- Spain

- Monarchs (complete list) –

- Felipe VI, king (since 19 June 2014)

- Prime ministers (complete list) –

- Pedro Sánchez, prime minister (since 2 June 2018)

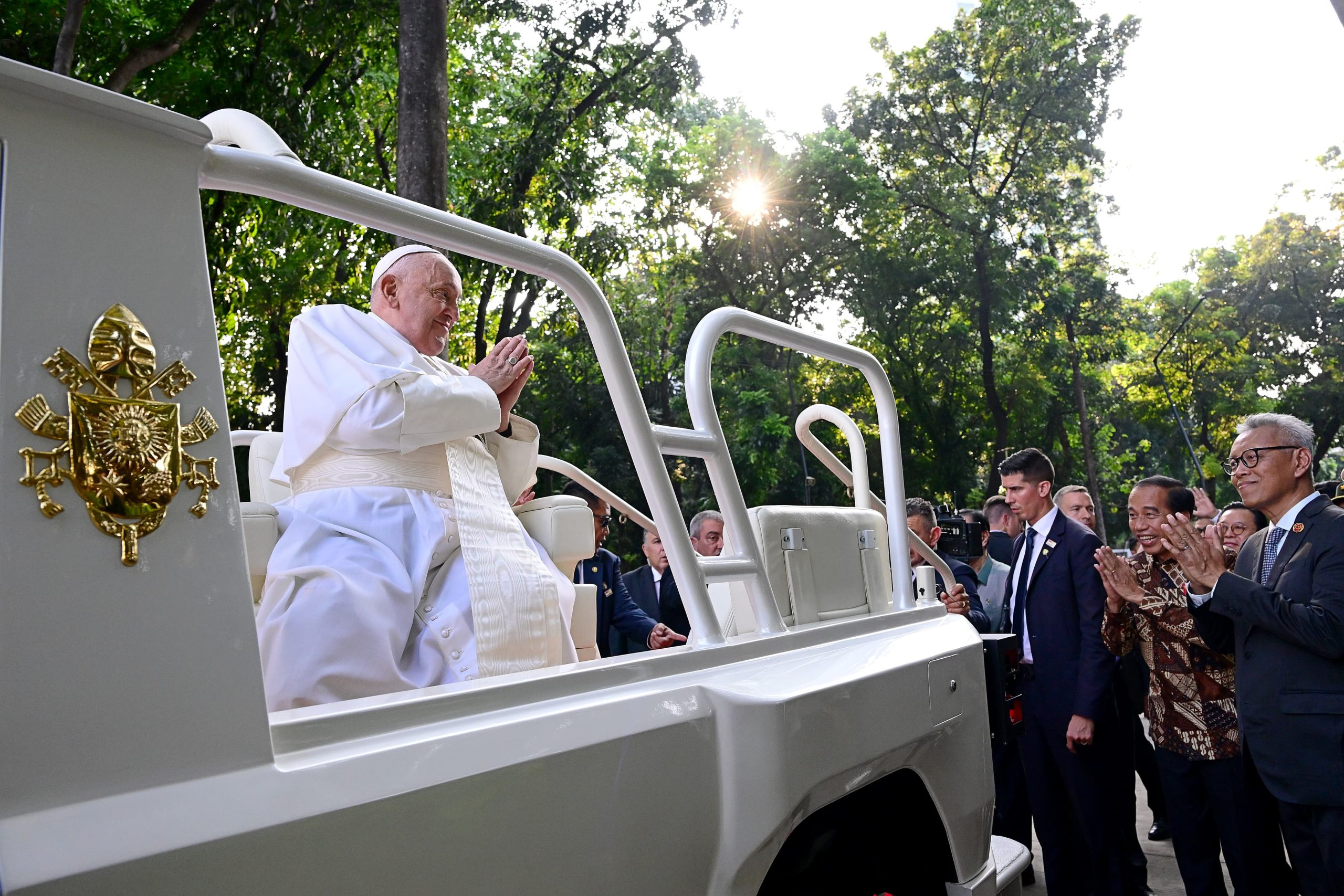
Pope Francis during a visit to Indonesia in 2024

Pope Leo XIV in 2026

- Vatican City

- Popes (complete list) –

- Francis, pope (13 March 2013 – 21 April 2025)
- Leo XIV, pope (since 8 May 2025)

- Presidents of the Governorate (complete list) –

- Giuseppe Bertello, president (1 October 2011 – 1 October 2021)
- Fernando Vérgez Alzaga, president (1 October 2021 – 1 March 2025)
- Raffaella Petrini, president (since 1 March 2025)

=== Europe: West ===
- Austria

- Presidents (complete list) –

- Alexander Van der Bellen, president (since 26 January 2017)

- Chancellors (complete list) –

- Brigitte Bierlein, chancellor (3 June 2019 – 7 January 2020)
- Sebastian Kurz, chancellor (7 January 2020 – 11 October 2021)
- Alexander Schallenberg, chancellor (11 October 2021 – 6 December 2021); acting chancellor (10 January 2025 – 3 March 2025)
- Karl Nehammer, chancellor (6 December 2021 – 10 January 2025)
- Christian Stocker, chancellor (since 3 March 2025)

- Belgium

- Monarchs (complete list) –

- Philippe, king (since 21 July 2013)

- Prime ministers (complete list) –

- Sophie Wilmès, prime minister (27 October 2019 – 1 October 2020)
- Alexander De Croo, prime minister (1 October 2020 – 3 February 2025)
- Bart De Wever, prime minister (since 3 February 2025)

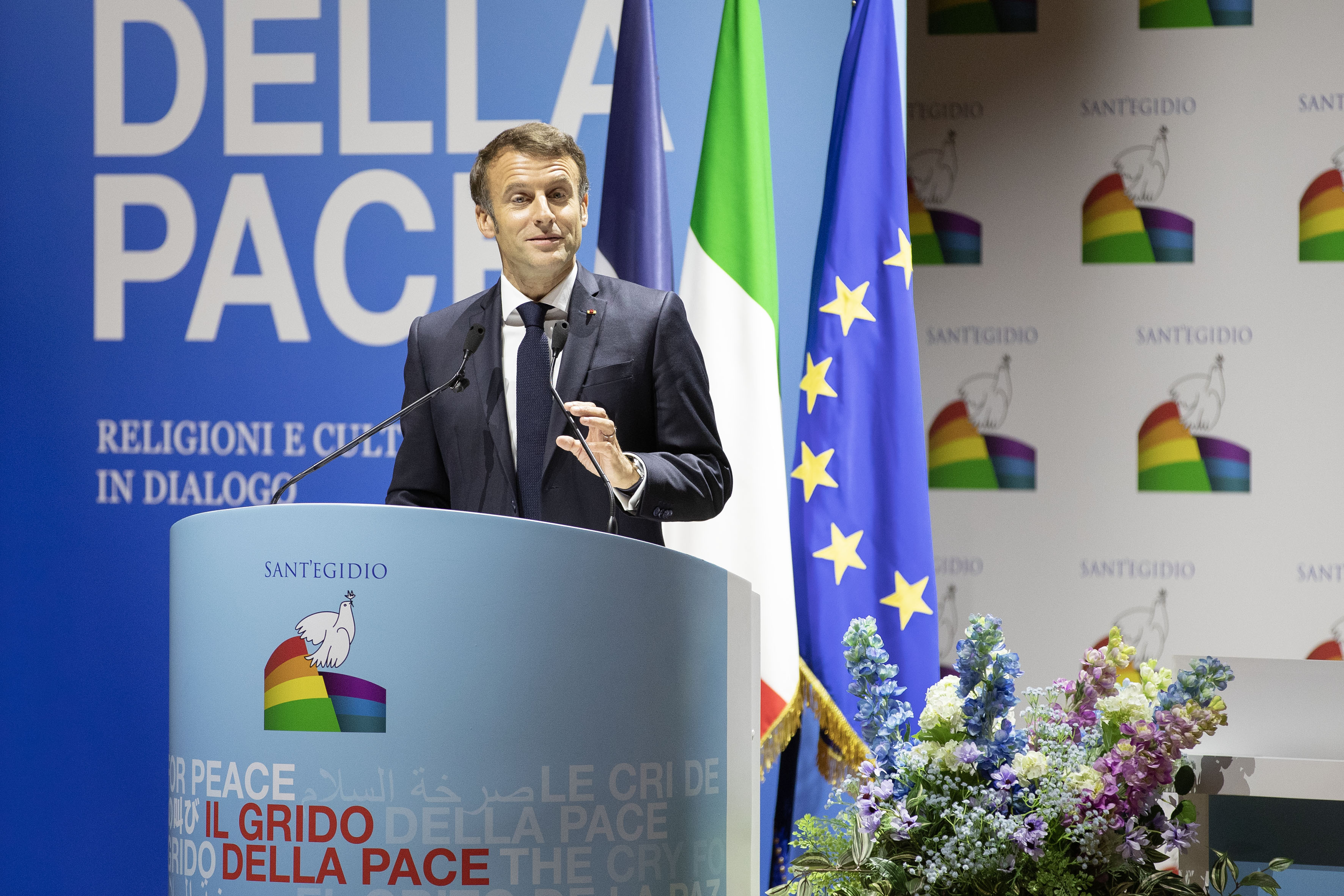
Emmanuel Macron in 2022

- France

- Presidents (complete list) –

- Emmanuel Macron, president (since 14 May 2017)

- Prime ministers (complete list) –

- Édouard Philippe, prime minister (15 May 2017 – 3 July 2020)
- Jean Castex, prime minister (3 July 2020 – 16 May 2022)
- Élisabeth Borne, prime minister (16 May 2022 – 9 January 2024)
- Gabriel Attal, prime minister (9 January 2024 – 5 September 2024)
- Michel Barnier, prime minister (5 September 2024 – 13 December 2024)
- François Bayrou, prime minister (since 13 December 2024)
- Sébastien Lecornu,prime minister (since 09 September 2025)

- Germany

- Presidents (complete list) –

- Frank-Walter Steinmeier, president (since 19 March 2017)

- Chancellors (complete list) –

- Angela Merkel, chancellor (22 November 2005 – 8 December 2021)
- Olaf Scholz, chancellor (8 December 2021 – 6 May 2025)
- Friedrich Merz, chancellor (since 6 May 2025)

- Liechtenstein

- Princes (complete list) –

- Hans-Adam II, prince (since 13 November 1989)

- Regents (complete list) –

- Alois, regent (since 15 August 2004)

- Prime ministers (complete list) –

- Adrian Hasler, prime minister (27 March 2013 – 25 March 2021)
- Daniel Risch, prime minister (25 March 2021 – 10 April 2025)
- Brigitte Haas, prime minister (since 10 April 2025)

- Luxembourg

- Monarchs (complete list) –

- Henri, grand duke (7 October 2000 – 3 October 2025)
- Guillaume V, grand duke (since 3 October 2025)

- Regents (complete list) –

- Guillaume, regent (8 October 2024 – 3 October 2025)

- Prime ministers (complete list) –

- Xavier Bettel, prime minister (4 December 2013 – 17 November 2023)
- Luc Frieden, prime minister (since 17 November 2023)

- Monaco

- Princed (complete list) –

- Albert II, prince (since 6 April 2005)

- Ministers of State (complete list) –

- Serge Telle, minister of state (1 February 2016 – 31 August 2020)
- Pierre Dartout, minister of state (1 September 2020 – 2 September 2024)
- Didier Guillaume, minister of state (2 September 2024 – 17 January 2025)
- Isabelle Berro-Amadeï, acting minister of state (10 January 2025 – 21 July 2025)
- Christophe Mirmand, minister of state (since 21 July 2025)

- The Netherlands

- Monarchs (complete list) –

- Willem-Alexander, king (since 30 April 2013)

- Prime ministers (complete list) –

- Mark Rutte, prime minister (14 October 2010 – 2 July 2024)
- Dick Schoof, prime minister (2 July 2024 – 3 June 2025); demissionary prime minister (since 3 June 2025 – 23 February 2026)
- Rob Jetten, prime minister (since 23 February 2026)

- Switzerland

- Federal Council

- Presidents (complete list) –

- Simonetta Sommaruga, president (1 January 2020 – 31 December 2020)
- Guy Parmelin, president (1 January 2021 – 31 December 2021)
- Ignazio Cassis, president (1 January 2022 – 31 December 2022)
- Alain Berset, president (1 January 2023 – 31 December 2023)
- Viola Amherd, president (1 January 2024 – 31 December 2024)
- Karin Keller-Sutter, president (since 1 January 2025)

- Members (complete list) –

- Ueli Maurer, member (1 January 2009 – 31 December 2022)
- Simonetta Sommaruga, member (1 November 2010 – 31 December 2022)
- Alain Berset, member (1 January 2012 – 31 December 2023)
- Guy Parmelin, member (since 1 January 2016)
- Ignazio Cassis, member (since 1 November 2017)
- Karin Keller-Sutter, member (since 1 January 2019)
- Viola Amherd, member (1 January 2019 – 31 March 2025)
- Albert Rösti, member (since 1 January 2023)
- Élisabeth Baume-Schneider, member (since 1 January 2023)
- Beat Jans, member (since 1 January 2024)
- Martin Pfister, member (since 1 April 2025)

== Oceania ==
=== Oceania: Australia and New Zealand ===
- Australia

- Monarchs (complete list) –

- Elizabeth II, queen (6 February 1952 – 8 September 2022)
- Charles III, king (since 8 September 2022)

- Governors-general (complete list) –

- David Hurley, governor-general (1 July 2019 – 1 July 2024)
- Sam Mostyn, governor-general (since 1 July 2024)

- Prime ministers (complete list) –

- Scott Morrison, prime minister (24 August 2018 – 23 May 2022)
- Anthony Albanese, prime minister (since 23 May 2022)

- New Zealand

- Monarchs (complete list) –

- Elizabeth II, queen (6 February 1952 – 8 September 2022)
- Charles III, king (since 8 September 2022)

- Governors-general (complete list) –

- Patsy Reddy, governor-general (28 September 2016 – 28 September 2021)
- Cindy Kiro, governor-general (since 21 October 2021)

- Prime ministers (complete list) –

- Jacinda Ardern, prime minister (26 October 2017 – 25 January 2023)
- Chris Hipkins, prime minister (25 January 2023 – 27 November 2023)
- Christopher Luxon, prime minister (since 27 November 2023)

=== Oceania: Melanesia ===
- Fiji

- Presidents (complete list) –

- Jioji Konrote, president (12 November 2015 – 12 November 2021)
- Wiliame Katonivere, president (12 November 2021 – 12 November 2024)
- Naiqama Lalabalavu, president (since 12 November 2024)

- Prime ministers (complete list) –

- Frank Bainimarama, prime minister (22 September 2014 – 24 December 2022)
- Sitiveni Rabuka, prime minister (since 24 December 2022)

- Papua New Guinea

- Monarchs (complete list) –

- Elizabeth II, queen (16 September 1975 – 8 September 2022)
- Charles III, king (since 8 September 2022)

- Governors-general (complete list) –

- Bob Dadae, governor-general (since 28 February 2017)

- Prime ministers (complete list) –

- James Marape, prime minister (since 30 May 2019)

- Solomon Islands

- Monarchs (complete list) –

- Elizabeth II, queen (7 July 1978 – 8 September 2022)
- Charles III, king (since 8 September 2022)

- Governors-general (complete list) –

- David Vunagi, governor-general (7 July 2019 – 7 July 2024)
- David Tiva Kapu, governor-general (since 7 July 2024)

- Prime ministers (complete list) –

- Manasseh Sogavare, Prime minister (24 April 2019 – 2 May 2024)
- Jeremiah Manele, prime minister (2 May 2024 – 15 May 2026)
- Matthew Wale, prime minister (since 15 May 2026)

- Vanuatu

- Presidents (complete list) –

- Tallis Obed Moses, president (6 July 2017 – 6 July 2022)
- Seule Simeon, president (6 July 2022 – 23 July 2022)
- Nikenike Vurobaravu, president (since 23 July 2022)

- Prime ministers (complete list) –

- Charlot Salwai, prime minister (11 February 2016 – 20 April 2020, 6 October 2023 – 11 February 2025)
- Bob Loughman, prime minister (20 April 2020 – 4 November 2022)
- Ishmael Kalsakau, prime minister (4 November 2022 – 4 September 2023)
- Sato Kilman, prime minister (4 September 2023 – 6 October 2023)
- Jotham Napat, prime minister (since 11 February 2025)

=== Oceania: Micronesia ===
- Kiribati

- Presidents (complete list) –

- Taneti Maamau, president (since 11 March 2016)

- Marshall Islands

- Presidents (complete list) –

- Hilda Heine, president (28 January 2016 – 13 January 2020, since 3 January 2024)
- David Kabua, president (13 January 2020 – 3 January 2024)

- Federated States of Micronesia

- Presidents (complete list) –

- David Panuelo, president (11 May 2019 – 11 May 2023)
- Wesley Simina, president (since 11 May 2023)

- Nauru

- Presidents (complete list) –

- Lionel Aingimea, president (27 August 2019 – 29 September 2022)
- Russ Kun, president (29 September 2022 – 30 October 2023)
- David Adeang, president (since 30 October 2023)

- Palau

- Presidents (complete list) –

- Thomas Remengesau Jr., president (17 January 2013 – 21 January 2021)
- Surangel Whipps Jr., president (since 21 January 2021)

=== Oceania: Polynesia ===
- Cook Islands

- Monarchs (complete list) –

- Elizabeth II, queen (4 August 1965 – 8 September 2022)
- Charles III, king (since 8 September 2022)

- Monarch's representatives (complete list) –

- Tom Marsters, queen's representative (27 July 2013 – 8 September 2022); king's representative (since 8 September 2022)

- Prime ministers (complete list) –

- Henry Puna, prime minister (30 November 2010 – 1 October 2020)
- Mark Brown, prime minister (since 1 October 2020)

- Niue

- Monarchs (complete list) –

- Elizabeth II, queen (19 October 1974 – 8 September 2022)
- Charles III, king (since 8 September 2022)

- Monarch's representatives (complete list) –

- Patsy Reddy, queen's representative (28 September 2016 – 28 September 2021)
- Cindy Kiro, queen's representative (21 October 2021 – 8 September 2022); king's representative (since 8 September 2022)

- Heads of government (complete list) –

- Toke Talagi, premier (19 June 2008 – 11 June 2020)
- Dalton Tagelagi, premier (11 June 2020 – 3 September 2024); prime minister (since 3 September 2024)

- Samoa

- O le Ao o le Malo (complete list) –

- Tuimalealiʻifano Vaʻaletoʻa Sualauvi II, O le Ao o le Malo (since 21 July 2017)

- Prime ministers (complete list) –

- Tuilaʻepa Saʻilele Malielegaoi, prime minister (23 November 1998 – 23 July 2021, disputed with Fiamē Naomi Mataʻafa after 24 May 2021)
- Fiamē Naomi Mataʻafa, prime minister (since 24 May 2021, disputed with Tuilaʻepa Saʻilele Malielegaoi before 23 July 2021)
- Laʻauli Leuatea Schmidt , prime minister (since 16 September 2025)

- Tonga

- Monarchs (complete list) –

- Tupou VI, king (since 18 March 2012)

- Prime ministers (complete list) –

- Pōhiva Tuʻiʻonetoa, prime minister (8 October 2019 – 27 December 2021)
- Siaosi Sovaleni, prime minister (27 December 2021 – 9 December 2024)
- Samiu Vaipulu, acting prime minister (9 December 2024 – 22 January 2025)
- ʻAisake Eke, prime minister (22 January 2025 – 18 December 2025)
- Fatafehi Fakafānua, prime minister (since 18 December 2025)

- Tuvalu

- Monarchs (complete list) –

- Elizabeth II, queen (1 October 1978 – 8 September 2022)
- Charles III, king (since 8 September 2022)

- Governors-general (complete list) –

- Teniku Talesi, acting governor-general (22 August 2019 – January 2021)
- Samuelu Teo, acting governor-general (January 2021 – 28 September 2021)
- Tofiga Vaevalu Falani, governor-general (28 September 2021 – 30 September 2026)
- Temukisa Auina Penehuro Hauma, governor-general (since 30 September 2026)

- Prime ministers (complete list) –

- Kausea Natano, prime minister (19 September 2019 – 26 February 2024)
- Feleti Teo, prime minister (since 26 February 2024)

== See also ==
- List of state leaders in the 2000s
- List of state leaders in the 2010s
- List of governors of dependent territories in the 21st century
- List of current heads of state and government
