= List of state leaders in the 2010s =

This is a list of state leaders in the 2010s (2010–2019) AD, such as the heads of state, heads of government, or the general secretaries of single-party states.

These polities are generally sovereign states, including states with limited recognition (when recognised by at least one UN member state), but excludes minor dependent territories, whose leaders can be found listed under territorial governors in the 21st century. For completeness, these lists can include colonies, protectorates, or other dependent territories that have since gained sovereignty.

== Africa ==
=== Africa: Central ===
- Angola

- Presidents (complete list) –

- José Eduardo dos Santos, President (1979–2017)
- João Lourenço, President (2017-present)

- Prime ministers (complete list) –

- Paulo Kassoma, Prime minister (2008–2010)

position currently abolished

- Cameroon

- Presidents (complete list) –

- Paul Biya, President (1982–present)

- Prime ministers (complete list) –

- Philémon Yang, Prime minister (2009–2019)
- Joseph Ngute, Prime minister (2019–present)

- Central African Republic

- Presidents (complete list) –

- François Bozizé, President (2003–2013)
- Michel Djotodia, President (2013), Transitional Head of State (2013–2014)
- Alexandre-Ferdinand Nguendet, Acting Transitional Head of State (2014)
- Catherine Samba-Panza, Transitional Head of State (2014–2016)
- Faustin-Archange Touadéra, President (2016–present)

- Prime ministers (complete list) –

- Faustin-Archange Touadéra, Prime minister (2008–2013)
- Nicolas Tiangaye, Prime minister (2013–2014)
- André Nzapayeké, Interim Prime minister (2014)
- Mahamat Kamoun, Interim Prime minister (2014–2016)
- Simplice Sarandji, Prime minister (2016–2019)
- Firmin Ngrébada, Prime minister (2019–2021)

- Chad

- Heads of state (complete list) –

- Idriss Déby, President (1990–2021)

- Prime ministers (complete list) –

- Youssouf Saleh Abbas, Prime minister (2008–2010)
- Emmanuel Nadingar, Prime minister (2010–2013)
- Djimrangar Dadnadji, Prime minister (2013)
- Kalzeubet Pahimi Deubet, Prime minister (2013–2016)
- Albert Pahimi Padacké, Prime minister (2016–2018; 2021–2022)

- Democratic Republic of the Congo

- Presidents (complete list) –

- Joseph Kabila, President (2001–2019)
- Felix Tshisekedi, President (2019-present)

- Prime ministers (complete list) –

- Adolphe Muzito, Prime minister (2008–2012)
- Louis Alphonse Koyagialo, Acting Prime minister (2012)
- Augustin Matata Ponyo, Prime minister (2012–2016)
- Samy Badibanga, Prime minister (2016–2017)
- Bruno Tshibala, Prime minister (2017–2019)
- Sylvestre Ilunga, Prime minister (2019–2021)

- Republic of the Congo

- Presidents (complete list) –

- Denis Sassou Nguesso, President (1997–present)

- Prime ministers (complete list) –

- Clément Mouamba, Prime minister (2016–2021)

- Equatorial Guinea

- Presidents (complete list) –

- Teodoro Obiang Nguema Mbasogo, President (1979–present)

- Prime ministers (complete list) –

- Ignacio Milam Tang, Prime minister (2008–2012)
- Vicente Ehate Tomi, Prime minister (2012–2016)
- Francisco Pascual Obama Asue, Prime minister (2016–2023)

- Gabon

- Presidents (complete list) –

- Ali Bongo Ondimba, President (2009–2023)

- Prime ministers (complete list) –

- Paul Biyoghé Mba, Prime minister (2009–2012)
- Raymond Ndong Sima, Prime minister (2012–2014)
- Daniel Ona Ondo, Prime minister (2014–2016)
- Emmanuel Issoze-Ngondet, Prime minister (2016–2019)
- Julien Nkoghe Bekale, Prime minister (2019–2020)

- São Tomé and Príncipe

- Presidents (complete list) –

- Fradique de Menezes, President (2003–2011)
- Manuel Pinto da Costa, President (2011–2016)
- Evaristo Carvalho, President (2016–2021)

- Prime ministers (complete list) –

- Joaquim Rafael Branco, Prime minister (2008–2010)
- Patrice Trovoada, Prime minister (2010–2012)
- Gabriel Costa, Prime minister (2012–2014)
- Patrice Trovoada, Prime minister (2014–2018)
- Jorge Bom Jesus, Prime minister (2018–2022)

=== Africa: East ===
- Burundi

- Presidents (complete list) –

- Pierre Nkurunziza, President (2005–2020)

- Comoros (complete list) –

- Ahmed Abdallah Mohamed Sambi, President (2006–2011)
- Ikililou Dhoinine, President (2011–2016)
- Azali Assoumani, President (2016–present)

- Djibouti

- Presidents (complete list) –

- Ismaïl Omar Guelleh, President (1999–present)

- Prime ministers (complete list) –

- Dileita Mohamed Dileita, Prime minister (2001–2013)
- Abdoulkader Kamil Mohamed, Prime minister (2013–present)

- Eritrea (complete list) –

- Isaias Afwerki, President (1993–present)

- Ethiopia

- Presidents (complete list) –

- Girma Wolde-Giorgis, President (2001–2013)
- Mulatu Teshome, President (2013–2018)
- Sahle-Work Zewde, President (2018–2024)

- Prime ministers (complete list) –

- Meles Zenawi, Prime minister (1995–2012)
- Hailemariam Desalegn, Prime minister (2012–2018)
- Abiy Ahmed, Prime minister (2018–present)

- Kenya

- Presidents (complete list) –

- Mwai Kibaki, President (2002–2013)
- Uhuru Kenyatta, President (2013–2022)

- Prime ministers (complete list) –

- Raila Odinga, Prime minister (2008–2013)

- Madagascar: Third Republic

- Presidents (complete list) –

- Andry Rajoelina, President of High Transitional Authority (2009–2014)

- Prime ministers (complete list) –

- Albert Camille Vital, Prime minister (2009–2011)

- High Transitional Authority: Madagascar (complete list) –

- Andry Rajoelina, President (2009–2014)

- Madagascar: Fourth Republic

- Presidents (complete list) –

- Hery Rajaonarimampianina, President (2014–2018)
- Rivo Rakotovao, Acting president (2018–2019)
- Andry Rajoelina, President (2019–2023)

- Prime ministers (complete list) –

- Omer Beriziky, Prime minister (2011–2014)
- Roger Kolo, Prime minister (2014–2015)
- Jean Ravelonarivo, Prime minister (2015–2016)
- Olivier Mahafaly Solonandrasana, Prime minister (2016–2018)
- Christian Ntsay, Prime minister (2018–2025)

- Mauritius

- Presidents (complete list) –

- Cassam Uteem, President (1992–2002)
- Angidi Chettiar, Acting President (2002)
- Ariranga Pillay, Acting President (2002)
- Karl Offmann, President (2002–2003)
- Raouf Bundhun, Acting president (2003)
- Anerood Jugnauth, President (2003–2012)
- Monique Ohsan Bellepeau, Acting president (2012)
- Kailash Purryag, President (2012–2015)
- Monique Ohsan Bellepeau, Acting president (2015)
- Ameenah Gurib, President (2015–2018)
- Barlen Vyapoory, Acting president (2018–2019)
- Eddy Balancy, Acting president (2019)
- Prithvirajsing Roopun, President (2019–2024)

- Prime ministers (complete list) –

- Navin Ramgoolam, Prime minister (1995–2000)
- Anerood Jugnauth, Prime minister (2000–2003)
- Paul Bérenger, Prime minister (2003–2005)
- Navin Ramgoolam, Prime minister (2005–2014)
- Anerood Jugnauth, Prime minister (2014–2017)
- Pravind Jugnauth, Prime minister (2017–2024)

- Rwanda

- Presidents (complete list) –

- Paul Kagame, President (2000–present)

- Prime ministers (complete list) –

- Bernard Makuza, Prime minister (2000–2011)
- Pierre Habumuremyi, Prime minister (2011–2014)
- Anastase Murekezi, Prime minister (2014–2017)
- Édouard Ngirente, Prime minister (2017–2025)

- Seychelles (complete list) –

- James Michel, President (2004–2016)
- Danny Faure, President (2016–2020)

- Transitional Federal Government of the Republic of Somalia

- Presidents (complete list) –

- Sharif Sheikh Ahmed, President (2009–2012)

- Prime ministers (complete list) –

- Omar Abdirashid Ali Sharmarke, Prime minister (2009–2010)
- Abdiwahid Elmi Gonjeh, Acting Prime minister (2010)
- Mohamed Abdullahi Mohamed, Prime minister (2010–2011)
- Abdiweli Mohamed Ali, Prime minister (2011–2012)

- Federal Republic of Somalia

- Presidents (complete list) –

- Muse Hassan Sheikh Sayid Abdulle, Acting President (2012)
- Mohamed Osman Jawari, Acting President (2012)
- Hassan Sheikh Mohamud, President (2012–2017)
- Mohamed Abdullahi Mohamed, President (2017–2022)

- Prime ministers (complete list) –

- Abdiweli Mohamed Ali, Acting Prime minister (2012)
- Abdi Farah Shirdon, Prime minister (2012–2013)
- Abdiweli Sheikh Ahmed, Prime minister (2013–2014)
- Omar Abdirashid Ali Sharmarke, Prime minister (2014–2017)
- Hassan Ali Khaire, Prime minister (2017–2020)

- Republic of Somaliland (complete list) –

- Dahir Riyale Kahin, President (2002–2010)
- Ahmed Mohamed Mohamoud, President (2010–2017)
- Muse Bihi Abdi, President (2017–present)

- South Sudan (complete list) –

- Salva Kiir, President (2011–present)

- Tanzania

- Presidents (complete list) –

- Jakaya Kikwete, President (2005–2015)
- John Magufuli, President (2015–2021)

- Prime ministers (complete list) –

- Mizengo Pinda, Prime minister (2008–2015)
- Kassim Majaliwa, Prime minister (2015–2025)

- Uganda

- Presidents (complete list) –

- Yoweri Museveni, President (1986–present)

- Prime ministers (complete list) –

- Apolo Nsibambi, Prime minister (1999–2011)
- Amama Mbabazi, Prime minister (2011–2014)
- Ruhakana Rugunda, Prime minister (2014–2021)

=== Africa: Northcentral ===
- Libyan Arab Jamahiriya

- Heads of state (complete list) –

- Muammar Gaddafi,

- Chairman of the Revolutionary Command Council (1969–1977)
- Brotherly Leader and Guide of the Revolution (1977–2011)

- Prime ministers (complete list) –

- Baghdadi Mahmudi, Prime minister (2006–2011)

- National Transitional Council of Libya

- Head of state (complete list) –

- Mustafa Abdul Jalil, Chairman of the National Transitional Council (2011–2012)

- Prime ministers (complete list) –

- Mahmoud Jibril, Acting Prime minister (2011)
- Ali Tarhouni, Acting Prime minister (2011)
- Abdurrahim El-Keib, Acting Prime minister (2011–2012)

- State of Libya

- Heads of state (complete list) –

- Mohammed Ali Salim, Acting President (2012)
- Mohammed Magariaf, President (2012–2013)
- Giuma Ahmed Atigha, Acting President (2013)
- Nouri Abusahmain

- President of the General National Congress of Libya (2013–2014)
- Contesting Chairman of the 2014 General National Congress of Libya (2014–2016)

- Abu Bakr Baira, Acting President of the House of Representatives (2014)
- Aguila Saleh Issa, contesting President of the House of Representatives (2014–present)
- Presidential Council (2016–present)

- Fayez al-Sarraj, Chairman (2016–2021)

- Prime ministers (complete list) –

- Abdurrahim El-Keib, Acting Prime minister (2012)
- Ali Zeidan, Prime minister (2012–2014)
- Abdullah al-Thani, Prime minister in rebellion (2014–present)
- Fayez al-Sarraj, Prime minister (2016–2021)

- Tunisia

- Presidents (complete list) –

- Zine El Abidine Ben Ali, President (1987–2011)
- Fouad Mebazaa, Acting President (2011)
- Moncef Marzouki, President (2011–2014)
- Beji Caid Essebsi, President (2014–2019)
- Mohamed Ennaceur, Acting president (2019)
- Kais Saied, President (2019–present)

- Prime ministers (complete list) –

- Mohamed Ghannouchi, Prime minister (1999–2011)
- Beji Caid Essebsi, Prime minister (2011)
- Hamadi Jebali, Head of government (2011–2013)
- Ali Laarayedh, Head of government (2013–2014)
- Mehdi Jomaa, Head of government (2014–2015)
- Habib Essid, Head of government (2015–2016)
- Youssef Chahed, Head of government (2016–2020)

=== Africa: Northeast ===
- Egypt

- Presidents (complete list) –

- Hosni Mubarak, President (1981–2011)
- Mohamed Hussein Tantawi, Interim Head of state (2011–2012)
- Mohamed Morsi, President (2012–2013)
- Adly Mansour, Interim President (2013–2014)
- Abdel Fattah el-Sisi, President (2014–present)

- Prime ministers (complete list) –

- Ahmed Nazif, Prime minister (2004–2011)
- Ahmed Shafik, Prime minister (2011)
- Essam Sharaf, Prime minister (2011)
- Kamal Ganzouri, Prime minister (2011–2012)
- Hesham Qandil, Prime minister (2012–2013)
- Hazem Al Beblawi, Acting Prime minister (2013–2014)
- Ibrahim Mahlab, Prime minister (2014–2015)
- Sherif Ismail, Prime minister (2015–2018)
- Moustafa Madbouly, Prime minister (2018–present)

- Sudan

- Presidents (complete list)

- Omar al-Bashir, President (1989–2019)
- Ahmed Awad Ibn Auf, Chairman of the Transitional Military Council (2019)
- Abdel Fattah al-Burhan, Chairman of the Transitional Military Council (2019)
- Sovereignty Council of Sudan (2019–2021)

- Prime Minister (complete list)

- Bakri Hassan Saleh, Prime Minister (2017–2018)
- Motazz Moussa, Prime Minister (2018–2019)
- Mohamed Tahir Ayala, Prime Minister (2019)
- Abdalla Hamdok, Prime Minister (2019–2022)

=== Africa: Northwest ===
- Algeria

- Presidents (complete list) –

- Abdelaziz Bouteflika, President (1999–2019)
- Abdelkader Bensalah, Acting President (2019)
- Abdelmadjid Tebboune, President (2019–present)

- Prime Ministers (complete list) –

- Ahmed Ouyahia, Prime Minister (2008–2012)
- Abdelmalek Sellal, Prime Minister (2012–2014)
- Youcef Yousfi, Acting Prime Minister (2014)
- Abdelmalek Sellal, Prime Minister (2014–2017)
- Abdelmadjid Tebboune, Prime Minister (2017)
- Ahmed Ouyahia, Prime Minister (2017–2019)
- Noureddine Bedoui, Prime Minister (2019)
- Sabri Boukadoum, Acting Prime Minister (2019)
- Abdelaziz Djerad, Prime Minister (2019–2021)

- Morocco

- Alaouite dynasty (complete list) –

- Mohammed VI, King (1999–present)

- Prime Ministers (complete list) –

- Abbas El Fassi, Prime Minister (2007–2011)
- Abdelilah Benkirane, Prime Minister (2011–2017)
- Saadeddine Othmani, Prime Minister (2017–2021)

- Sahrawi Arab Democratic Republic

- Presidents (complete list) –

- Mohamed Abdelaziz, President (1976–2016)
- Khatri Addouh, Acting President (2016)
- Brahim Ghali, President (2016–present)

- Prime Ministers (complete list) –

- Abdelkader Taleb Omar, Prime Minister (2003–2018)
- Mohamed Wali Akeik, Prime Minister (2018–2020)

=== Africa: South ===
- Botswana (complete list) –

- Ian Khama, President (2008–2018)
- Mokgweetsi Masisi, President (2018–2024)

- Eswatini (Note: Swaziland before 2018)

- Kings (complete list) –

- Mswati III, King (1986–present)

- tiNdlovukati (complete list) –

- Ntfombi, Queen Regent (1983–1986), Ndlovukati (1983–present)

- Prime ministers (complete list) –

- Barnabas Sibusiso Dlamini, Prime minister (2008–2018)
- Vincent Mhlanga, Acting prime minister (2018)
- Ambrose Mandvulo Dlamini, Prime minister (2018–2020)

- Lesotho

- Monarchs (complete list) –

- Letsie III, King (1990–1995, 1996–present)

- Prime ministers (complete list) –

- Pakalitha Mosisili, Prime minister (1998–2012)
- Tom Thabane, Prime minister (2012–2015)
- Pakalitha Mosisili, Prime minister (2015–2017)
- Tom Thabane, Prime minister (2017–2020)

- Malawi (complete list) –

- Bingu wa Mutharika, President (2004–2012)
- Joyce Banda, President (2012–2014)
- Peter Mutharika, President (2014–2020)

- Mozambique

- Presidents (complete list) –

- Armando Guebuza, President (2005–2015)
- Filipe Nyusi, President (2015–2025)

- Prime ministers (complete list) –

- Luísa Diogo, Prime minister (2004–2010)
- Aires Ali, Prime minister (2010–2012)
- Alberto Vaquina, Prime minister (2012–2015)
- Carlos Agostinho do Rosário, Prime minister (2015–2022)

- Namibia

- Presidents (complete list) –

- Hifikepunye Pohamba, President (2005–2015)
- Hage Geingob, President (2015–2024)

- Prime ministers (complete list) –

- Nahas Angula, Prime minister (2005–2012)
- Hage Geingob, Prime minister (2012–2015)
- Saara Kuugongelwa, Prime minister (2015–2025)

- South Africa (complete list) –

- Jacob Zuma, President (2009–2018)
- Cyril Ramaphosa, President (2018–present)

- Zambia (complete list) –

- Rupiah Banda, President (2008–2011)
- Michael Sata, President (2011–2014)
- Guy Scott, Interim President (2014–2015)
- Edgar Lungu, President (2015–2021)

- Zimbabwe

- Presidents (complete list) –

- Robert Mugabe, President (1987–2017)
- Emmerson Mnangagwa, President (2017–present)

- Prime ministers (complete list) –

- Morgan Tsvangirai, Prime minister (2009–2013)

post abolished

=== Africa: West ===
- Benin

- Presidents (complete list) –

- Thomas Boni Yayi, President (2006–2016)
- Patrice Talon, President (2016–2026)

- Prime ministers (complete list) –

- Pascal Koupaki, Prime minister (2011–2013)
- Lionel Zinsou, Prime minister (2015–2016)

post abolished

- Burkina Faso

- Presidents (complete list) –

- Blaise Compaoré, President (1987–2014)
- Yacouba Isaac Zida, Transitional President (2014)
- Michel Kafando, Transitional President (2014–2015)
- Gilbert Diendéré, Chairman of the National Council for Democracy (2015)
- Chérif Sy, Acting President (2015)
- Michel Kafando, Transitional President (2015)
- Roch Marc Christian Kaboré, President (2015–2022)

- Prime ministers (complete list) –

- Tertius Zongo, Prime minister (2007–2011)
- Luc-Adolphe Tiao, Prime minister (2011–2014)
- Yacouba Isaac Zida, Prime minister (2014–2015)
- Paul Kaba Thieba, Prime minister (2016–2019)
- Christophe Joseph Marie Dabiré, Prime minister (2019–2021)

- Cape Verde

- Presidents (complete list) –

- Pedro Pires, President (2001–2011)
- Jorge Carlos Fonseca, President (2011–2021)

- Prime ministers (complete list) –

- José Maria Neves, Prime minister (2001–2016)
- Ulisses Correia e Silva, Prime minister (2016–2026)

- Gambia (complete list) –

- Yahya Jammeh, Chairman of the Armed Forces Provisional Ruling Council (1994–1996), President (1996–2017)
- Adama Barrow, President (2017–present)

- Ghana (complete list) –

- John Atta Mills, President (2009–2012)
- John Dramani Mahama, President (2012–2017)
- Nana Akufo-Addo, President (2017–2025)

- Guinea

- Presidents (complete list) –

- Sékouba Konaté, Acting President (2009–2010)
- Alpha Condé, President (2010–2021)

- Prime ministers (complete list) –

- Kabiné Komara, Prime minister (2008–2010)
- Jean-Marie Doré, Prime minister (2010)
- Mohamed Said Fofana, Prime minister (2010–2015)
- Mamady Youla, Prime minister (2015–2018)
- Ibrahima Kassory Fofana, Prime minister (2018–2021)

- Guinea-Bissau

- Presidents (complete list) –

- Malam Bacai Sanhá, President (2009–2012)
- Raimundo Pereira, Acting President (2012)
- Mamadu Ture Kuruma, Chairman of the Military Command (2012)
- Manuel Serifo Nhamadjo, Acting President (2012–2014)
- José Mário Vaz, President (2014–2020)

- Prime ministers (complete list) –

- Carlos Gomes Júnior, Prime minister (2009–2012)
- Adiato Djaló Nandigna, Acting Prime minister (2012)
- Rui Duarte de Barros, Acting Prime minister (2012–2014)
- Domingos Simões Pereira, Prime minister (2014–2015)
- Baciro Djá, Prime minister (2015)
- Carlos Correia, Prime minister (2015–2016)
- Baciro Djá, Prime minister (2016)
- Umaro Sissoco Embaló, Prime minister (2016–2018)
- Artur Silva, Prime minister (2018)
- Aristides Gomes, Prime minister (2018–2020)

- Ivory Coast

- Presidents (complete list) –

- Laurent Gbagbo, President (2000–2011)
- Alassane Ouattara, President (2010–present)

- Prime ministers (complete list) –

- Guillaume Soro, Prime minister (2007–2012)
- Gilbert Aké, disputed prime minister (2010–2011)
- Jeannot Ahoussou-Kouadio, Prime minister (2012)
- Daniel Kablan Duncan, Prime minister (2012–2017)
- Amadou Gon Coulibaly, Prime minister (2017–2020)

- Liberia (complete list) –

- Ellen Johnson Sirleaf, President (2006–2018)
- George Weah, President (2018–2024)

- Mali

- Presidents (complete list) –

- Amadou Toumani Touré, President (2002–2012)
- Amadou Sanogo, Chairperson of the National Committee (2012)
- Dioncounda Traoré, Acting President (2012–2013)
- Ibrahim Boubacar Keïta, President (2013–2020)

- Prime ministers (complete list) –

- Modibo Sidibé, Prime minister (2007–2011)
- Cissé Mariam Kaïdama Sidibé, Prime minister (2011–2012)
- Cheick Modibo Diarra, Acting Prime minister (2012)
- Django Sissoko, Acting Prime minister (2012–2013)
- Oumar Tatam Ly, Prime minister (2013–2014)
- Moussa Mara, Prime minister (2014–2015)
- Modibo Keita, Prime minister (2015–2017)
- Abdoulaye Idrissa Maïga, Prime minister (2017)
- Soumeylou Boubèye Maïga, Prime minister (2017–2019)
- Boubou Cisse, Prime Minister (2019–2020)

- Mauritania

- Presidents (complete list) –

- Mohamed Ould Abdel Aziz, President (2009–2019)
- Mohamed Ould Ghazouani, President (2019–present)

- Prime ministers (complete list) –

- Moulaye Ould Mohamed Laghdaf, Prime minister (2008–2014)
- Yahya Ould Hademine, Prime minister (2014–2018)
- Mohamed Salem Ould Béchir, Prime minister (2018–2019)
- Ismail Ould Bedde Ould Cheikh Sidiya, Prime minister (2019–2020)

- Niger

- Presidents (complete list) –

- Mamadou Tandja, President (1999–2010)
- Salou Djibo, Chairman of the Supreme Council for the Restoration of Democracy (2010–2011)
- Mahamadou Issoufou, President (2011–2021)

- Prime ministers (complete list) –

- Ali Badjo Gamatié, Prime minister (2009–2010)
- Mahamadou Danda, Prime minister (2010–2011)
- Brigi Rafini, Prime minister (2011–2021)

- Nigeria (complete list) –

- Umaru Musa Yar'Adua, President (2007–2010)
- Goodluck Jonathan, President (2010–2015)
- Muhammadu Buhari, President (2015–2023)

- Senegal

- Presidents (complete list) –

- Abdoulaye Wade, President (2000–2012)
- Macky Sall, President (2012–2024)

- Prime ministers (complete list) –

- Souleymane Ndéné Ndiaye, Prime minister (2009–2012)
- Abdoul Mbaye, Prime minister (2012–2013)
- Aminata Touré, Prime minister (2013–2014)
- Mahammed Dionne, Prime minister (2014–2019)

- Sierra Leone

- Presidents (complete list) –

- Ernest Bai Koroma, President (2007–2018)
- Julius Maada Bio, President (2018–present)

- Chief ministers (complete list) –

- David J. Francis, Chief minister (2018–2021)

- Togo

- Presidents (complete list) –

- Faure Gnassingbé, President (2005–present)

- Prime ministers (complete list) –

- Gilbert Houngbo, Prime minister (2008–2012)
- Kwesi Ahoomey-Zunu, Prime minister (2012–2015)
- Komi Sélom Klassou, Prime minister (2015–2020)

== Americas ==
=== Americas: Caribbean and Lucayan ===
- Antigua and Barbuda

- Monarchs (complete list) –

- Elizabeth II, Queen (1981–2022)

- Prime ministers (complete list) –

- Baldwin Spencer, Prime minister (2004–2014)
- Gaston Browne, Prime minister (2014–present)

- Aruba (complete list) –

Constituent country 2010–present
For details see the Netherlands under western Europe

- Bahamas

- Monarchs (complete list) –

- Elizabeth II, Queen (1973–2022)

- Prime ministers (complete list) –

- Hubert Ingraham, Prime minister (2007–2012)
- Perry Christie, Prime minister (2012–2017)
- Hubert Minnis, Prime minister (2017–2021)

- Barbados

- Monarchs (complete list) –

- Elizabeth II, Queen (1966–2021)

- Prime ministers (complete list) –

- David Thompson, Prime minister (2008–2010)
- Freundel Stuart, Prime minister (2010–2018)
- Mia Mottley, Prime minister (2018–present)

- Cuba

- First Secretaries of the Communist Party of Cuba

- Fidel Castro, First secretary (1965–2011)
- Raúl Castro, First secretary (2011–2021)

- Presidents (complete list) –

- Raúl Castro, President of the State Council (2008–2018)
- Miguel Díaz-Canel, President (2018–present)

- Heads of government (complete list) –

- Raúl Castro, President of the Council of Ministers (2008–2018)
- Miguel Díaz-Canel, acting Prime minister (2018–2019)
- Manuel Marrero Cruz, Prime minister (2019–present)

- Curaçao (complete list) –

Constituent country 2010–present
For details see the Netherlands under western Europe

- Dominica

- Presidents (complete list) –

- Nicholas Liverpool, President (2003–2012)
- Eliud Williams, President (2012–2013)
- Charles Savarin, President (2013–2023)

- Prime ministers (complete list) –

- Roosevelt Skerrit, Prime minister (2004–present)

- Dominican Republic (complete list) –

- Leonel Fernández, President (2004–2012)
- Danilo Medina, President (2012–2020)

- Grenada

- Monarchs (complete list) –

- Elizabeth II, Queen (1974–2022)

- Prime ministers (complete list) –

- Tillman Thomas, Prime minister (2008–2013)
- Keith Mitchell, Prime minister (2013–2022)

- Haiti

- Heads of state (complete list) –

- René Préval, President (2006–2011)
- Michel Martelly, President (2011–2016)
- Council of Ministers (2016)
- Jocelerme Privert, Provisional President (2016–2017)
- Jovenel Moïse, President (2017–2021)

- Prime ministers (complete list) –

- Jean-Max Bellerive, Prime minister (2009–2011)
- Garry Conille, Prime minister (2011–2012)
- Laurent Lamothe, Prime minister (2012–2014)
- Florence Duperval Guillaume, Acting Prime minister (2014–2015)
- Evans Paul, Prime minister (2015–2016)
- Fritz Jean, Prime minister (2016)
- Enex Jean-Charles, Prime minister (2016–2017)
- Jack Guy Lafontant, Prime minister (2017–2018)
- Jean-Henry Céant, Prime minister (2018–2019)
- Jean-Michel Lapin, Acting Prime minister (2019–2020)

- Jamaica

- Monarchs (complete list) –

- Elizabeth II, Queen (1962–2022)

- Prime ministers (complete list) –

- Bruce Golding, Prime minister (2007–2011)
- Andrew Holness, Prime minister (2011–2012)
- Portia Simpson-Miller, Prime minister (2012–2016)
- Andrew Holness, Prime minister (2016–present)

- Netherlands Antilles (complete list) –

Constituent country 1954–2010
For details see the Netherlands under western Europe

- Saint Kitts and Nevis

- Monarchs (complete list) –

- Elizabeth II, Queen (1983–2022)

- Prime ministers (complete list) –

- Denzil Douglas, Prime minister (1995–2015)
- Timothy Harris, Prime minister (2015–2022)

- Saint Lucia

- Monarchs (complete list) –

- Elizabeth II, Queen (1979–2022)

- Prime ministers (complete list) –

- Stephenson King, Prime minister (2007–2011)
- Kenny Anthony, Prime minister (2011–2016)
- Allen Chastanet, Prime minister (2016–2021)

- Sint Maarten (complete list) –

Constituent country 2010–present
For details see the Netherlands under western Europe

- Saint Vincent and the Grenadines

- Monarchs (complete list) –

- Elizabeth II, Queen (1979–2022)

- Prime ministers (complete list) –

- Ralph Gonsalves, Prime minister (2001–2025)

- Trinidad and Tobago

- Presidents (complete list) –

- George Maxwell Richards, President (2003–2013)
- Anthony Carmona, President (2013–2018)
- Paula-Mae Weekes, President (2018–2023)

- Prime ministers (complete list) –

- Patrick Manning, Prime minister (2001–2010)
- Kamla Persad-Bissessar, Prime minister (2010–2015)
- Keith Rowley, Prime minister (2015–2025)

=== Americas: Central ===
- Belize

- Monarchs (complete list) –

- Elizabeth II, Queen (1981–2022)

- Prime ministers (complete list) –

- Dean Barrow, Prime minister (2008–2020)

- Costa Rica (complete list) –

- Óscar Arias, President (2006–2010)
- Laura Chinchilla, President (2010–2014)
- Luis Guillermo Solís, President (2014–2018)
- Carlos Alvarado Quesada, President (2018–2022)

- El Salvador (complete list) –

- Mauricio Funes, President (2009–2014)
- Salvador Sánchez Cerén, President (2014–2019)
- Nayib Bukele, President (2019–present)

- Guatemala (complete list) –

- Álvaro Colom, President (2008–2012)
- Otto Pérez Molina, President (2012–2015)
- Alejandro Maldonado, Acting President (2015–2016)
- Jimmy Morales, President (2016–2020)

- Honduras (complete list) –

- Roberto Micheletti, Acting President (2009–2010)
- Porfirio Lobo Sosa, President (2010–2014)
- Juan Orlando Hernández, President (2014–2022)

- Nicaragua (complete list) –

- Daniel Ortega, President (2007–present)

- Panama (complete list) –

- Ricardo Martinelli, President (2009–2014)
- Juan Carlos Varela, President (2014–2019)
- Laurentino Cortizo, President (2019–2024)

=== Americas: North ===
- Canada

- Monarchs (complete list) –

- Elizabeth II, Queen (1952–2022)

- Prime ministers (complete list) –

- Stephen Harper, Prime minister (2006–2015)
- Justin Trudeau, Prime minister (2015–2025)

- Mexico (complete list) –

- Felipe Calderón, President (2006–2012)
- Enrique Peña Nieto, President (2012–2018)
- Andrés Manuel López Obrador, President (2018–2024

- United States (complete list) –

- Barack Obama, President (2009–2017)
- Donald Trump, President (2017–2021)

=== Americas: South ===
- Argentina (complete list) –

- Cristina Fernández de Kirchner, President (2007–2015)
- Mauricio Macri, President (2015–2019)
- Alberto Fernandez, President (2019–2023)

- Bolivia (complete list) –

- Evo Morales, President (2006–2019)
- Jeanine Áñez, President (2019–2020)

- Brazil (complete list) –

- Luiz Inácio Lula da Silva, President (2003–2011)
- Dilma Rousseff, President (2011–2016)
- Michel Temer, President (2016–2019)
- Jair Bolsonaro, President (2019–2023)

- Chile (complete list) –

- Michelle Bachelet, President (2006–2010)
- Sebastián Piñera, President (2010–2014)
- Michelle Bachelet, President (2014–2018)
- Sebastián Piñera, President (2018–2022)

- Colombia (complete list) –

- Álvaro Uribe Vélez, President (2002–2010)
- Juan Manuel Santos Calderón, President (2010–2018)
- Iván Duque Márquez, President (2018–2022)

- Ecuador (complete list) –

- Rafael Correa, President (2007–2017)
- Lenín Moreno, President (2017–2021)

- Guyana

- Presidents (complete list) –

- Bharrat Jagdeo, President (1999–2011)
- Donald Ramotar, President (2011–2015)
- David A. Granger, President (2015–2020)

- Prime ministers (complete list) –

- Sam Hinds, Prime minister (1999–2015)
- Moses Nagamootoo, Prime minister (2015–2020)

- Paraguay (complete list) –

- Fernando Lugo, President (2008–2012)
- Federico Franco, President (2012–2013)
- Horacio Cartes, President (2013–2018)
- Mario Abdo Benítez, President (2018–2023)

- Peru

- Presidents (complete list) –

- Alan García Pérez, Constitutional President (2006–2011)
- Ollanta Humala, Constitutional President (2011–2016)
- Pedro Pablo Kuczynski, Constitutional President (2016–2018)
- Martín Vizcarra, Constitutional President (2018–2020)

- Prime minister (complete list) –

- Javier Velásquez, Prime Minister (2009–2010)
- José Antonio Chang, Prime Minister (2010–2011)
- Rosario Fernández, Prime Minister (2011)
- Salomón Lerner Ghitis, Prime Minister (2011)
- Oscar Valdés, Prime Minister (2011–2012)
- Juan Jiménez Mayor, Prime Minister (2012–2013)
- César Villanueva, Prime Minister (2013–2014)
- René Cornejo, Prime Minister (2014)
- Ana Jara, Prime Minister (2014–2015)
- Pedro Cateriano, Prime Minister (2015–2016)
- Fernando Zavala, Prime Minister (2016–2017)
- Mercedes Aráoz, Prime Minister (2017–2018)
- César Villanueva, Prime minister (2018–2019)
- Salvador del Solar, Prime minister (2019)
- Vicente Zeballos, Prime minister (2019–2020)

- Suriname (complete list) –

- Ronald Venetiaan, President (2000–2010)
- Dési Bouterse, President (2010–2021)

- Uruguay (complete list) –

- Tabaré Vázquez, President (2005–2010)
- José Mujica, President (2010–2015)
- Tabaré Vázquez, President (2015–2020)

- Venezuela (complete list) –

- Hugo Chávez, President (1999–2002, 2002–2013)
- Nicolás Maduro, President (2013–2026; disputed since 2019)
- Juan Guaidó, Acting President (2019–2023; disputed with Nicolás Maduro)

== Asia ==
=== Asia: Central ===
- Kazakhstan

- Presidents (complete list) –

- Nursultan Nazarbayev, President (1991–2019)
- Kassym-Jomart Tokayev, President (2019–present)

- Prime ministers (complete list) –

- Karim Massimov, Prime minister (2007–2012)
- Serik Akhmetov, Prime minister (2012–2014)
- Karim Massimov, Prime minister (2014–2016)
- Bakhytzhan Sagintayev, Prime minister (2016–2019)
- Askar Mamin, Prime minister (2019–2022)

- Kyrgyzstan

- Presidents (complete list) –

- Kurmanbek Bakiyev, President (2005–2010)
- Roza Otunbayeva, President (2010–2011)
- Almazbek Atambayev, President (2011–2017)
- Sooronbay Jeenbekov, President (2017–2020)

- Prime ministers (complete list) –

- Daniar Usenov, Prime minister (2009–2010)
- Almazbek Atambayev, Prime minister (2010–2011)
- Ömürbek Babanov, Acting Prime minister (2011)
- Almazbek Atambayev, Prime minister (2011)
- Ömürbek Babanov, Prime minister (2011–2012)
- Aaly Karashev, Acting Prime minister (2012)
- Zhantoro Satybaldiyev, Prime minister (2012–2014)
- Djoomart Otorbaev, Prime minister (2014–2015)
- Temir Sariyev, Prime minister (2015–2016)
- Sooronbay Jeenbekov, Prime minister (2016–2017)
- Sapar Isakov, Prime minister (2017–2018)
- Mukhammedkalyi Abylgaziev, Prime minister (2018–2020)

- Tajikistan

- Presidents (complete list) –

- Emomali Rahmon, Chairman of the Supreme Assembly (1992–1994), President (1994–present)

- Prime ministers (complete list) –

- Oqil Oqilov, Prime minister (1999–2013)
- Kokhir Rasulzoda, Prime minister (2013–present)

- Turkmenistan (complete list) –

- Gurbanguly Berdimuhamedow, Acting President (2006–2007), President (2007–2022)

- Uzbekistan

- Presidents (complete list) –

- Islam Karimov, President (1991–2016)
- Nigmatilla Yuldashev, Acting President (2016)
- Shavkat Mirziyoyev, President (2016–present)

- Prime ministers (complete list) –

- Shavkat Mirziyoyev, Prime minister (2003–2016)
- Abdulla Aripov, Prime minister (2016–present)

=== Asia: East ===
- China

- Chairmen and General Secretaries of the Communist Party (complete list) and paramount leaders (complete list) –

- Hu Jintao, General Secretary (2002–2012), paramount leader (2002–2012)
- Xi Jinping, General Secretary (2012–present), paramount leader (2012–present)

- Heads of state (complete list) –

- Hu Jintao, President (2003–2013)
- Xi Jinping, President (2013–present)

- Premiers (complete list) –

- Wen Jiabao, Premier (2003–2013)
- Li Keqiang, Premier (2013–2023)

- Japan

- Emperors (complete list) –

- Akihito, Emperor (1989–2019)
- Naruhito, Emperor (2019–present)

- Prime ministers (complete list) –

- Yukio Hatoyama, Prime minister (2009–2010)
- Naoto Kan, Prime minister (2010–2011)
- Yoshihiko Noda, Prime minister (2011–2012)
- Shinzō Abe, Prime minister (2012–2020)

- North Korea

- Leaders of the Workers' Party (complete list) –

- Kim Jong-il, General Secretary (1997–2011), Eternal General Secretary (2012–present)
- Kim Jong-un, First Secretary (2012–2016), Chairman (2016–2021), General Secretary (2021–present)

- Head of state

- Kim Yong-nam (1998–2019)
- Choe Ryong-hae (2019–present)
- Kim Jong-un, President of State Affairs (2016–present)

- Premiers (complete list) –

- Kim Yong-il, Premier (2007–2010)
- Choe Yong-rim, Premier (2010–2013)
- Pak Pong-ju, Premier (2013–2019)
- Kim Jae-ryong, Premier (2019–2020)

- South Korea

- Presidents (complete list) –

- Lee Myung-bak, President (2008–2013)
- Park Geun-hye, President (2013–2017)
- Hwang Kyo-ahn, Acting President (2016–2017)
- Moon Jae-in, President (2017–2022)

- Prime ministers (complete list) –

- Chung Un-chan, Prime minister (2009–2010)
- Yoon Jeung-hyun, Acting Prime minister (2010)
- Kim Hwang-sik, Prime minister (2010–2013)
- Chung Hong-won, Prime minister (2013–2015)
- Lee Wan-koo, Prime minister (2015)
- Choi Kyoung-hwan, Acting Prime minister (2015)
- Hwang Kyo-ahn, Prime minister (2015–2017)
- Yoo Il-ho, Acting Prime minister (2017)
- Lee Nak-yeon, Prime minister (2017–2020)

- Mongolia

- Presidents (complete list) –

- Tsakhiagiin Elbegdorj, President (2009–2017)
- Khaltmaagiin Battulga, President (2017–2021)

- Prime ministers (complete list) –

- Sükhbaataryn Batbold, Prime minister (2009–2012)
- Norovyn Altankhuyag, Prime minister (2012–2014)
- Dendeviin Terbishdagva, Acting Prime minister (2014)
- Chimediin Saikhanbileg, Prime minister (2014–2016)
- Jargaltulgyn Erdenebat, Prime minister (2016–2017)
- Ukhnaagiin Khürelsükh, Prime minister (2017–2021)

- Taiwan

- Presidents (complete list) –

- Ma Ying-jeou, President (2008–2016)
- Tsai Ing-wen, President (2016–2024)

- Premiers (complete list) –

- Wu Den-yih, Premier (2009–2012)
- Sean Chen, Premier (2012–2013)
- Jiang Yi-huah, Premier (2013–2014)
- Mao Chi-kuo, Premier (2014–2016)
- Chang San-cheng, Premier (2016)
- Lin Chuan, Premier (2016–2017)
- William Lai, Premier (2017–2019)
- Su Tseng-chang, Premier (2019–2023)

=== Asia: Southeast ===
- Brunei (complete list) –

- Hassanal Bolkiah, Sultan (1967–present) (Note: Hassanal Bolkiah did not become a state leader until Brunei's independence in 1984.)

- Cambodia

- Kings (complete list) –

- Norodom Sihamoni, King (2004–present)

- Prime ministers (complete list) –

- Hun Sen, Prime minister (1998–2023)

- Indonesia (complete list) –

- Susilo Bambang Yudhoyono, President (2004–2014)
- Joko Widodo, President (2014–2024)

- Laos

- General Secretaries (complete list) –

- Choummaly Sayasone, General Secretary (2006–2016)
- Bounnhang Vorachit, General Secretary (2016–2021)

- Presidents (complete list) –

- Choummaly Sayasone, President (2006–2016)
- Bounnhang Vorachit, President (2016–2021)

- Prime ministers (complete list) –

- Bouasone Bouphavanh, Prime minister (2006–2010)
- Thongsing Thammavong, Prime minister (2010–2016)
- Thongloun Sisoulith, Prime minister (2016–2021)

- Malaysia

- Elected monarchs (complete list) –

- Mizan Zainal Abidin of Terengganu, Yang di-Pertuan Agong (2006–2011)
- Abdul Halim of Kedah, Yang di-Pertuan Agong (2011–2016)
- Muhammad V of Kelantan, Yang di-Pertuan Agong (2016–2019)
- Abdullah of Pahang, Yang di-Pertuan Agong (2019–2024)

- Prime ministers (complete list) –

- Najib Razak, Prime minister (2009–2018)
- Mahathir Mohamad, Prime minister (2018–2020)

- Burma/Myanmar: State Peace and Development Council (1997–2011)

- Heads of state (complete list) –

- Than Shwe, Chairman (1992–2011)

- Prime ministers (complete list) –

- Thein Sein, Prime minister (2007–2011)

- Republic of the Union of Myanmar (2011–present)

- Presidents (complete list) –

- Thein Sein, President (2011–2016)
- Htin Kyaw, President (2016–2018)
- Myint Swe, Acting President (2018)
- Win Myint, President (2018–2021)

- State counsellors (complete list) –

- Position created 2016
- Aung San Suu Kyi, State Counsellor (2016–2021)

- Philippines

- Presidents (complete list) –

- Gloria Macapagal Arroyo, President (2001–2010)
- Benigno Aquino III, President (2010–2016)
- Rodrigo Duterte, President (2016–2022)

- Singapore

- Presidents (complete list) –

- S. R. Nathan, President (1999–2011)
- Tony Tan, President (2011–2017)
- Halimah Yacob, President (2017–2023)

- Prime ministers (complete list) –

- Lee Hsien Loong, Prime minister (2004–2024)

- Thailand

- Monarchs (complete list) –

- Bhumibol Adulyadej, King (1946–2016)
- Vajiralongkorn, King (2016–present)

- Prime ministers (complete list) –

- Abhisit Vejjajiva, Prime minister (2008–2011)
- Yingluck Shinawatra, Prime minister (2011–2014)
- Niwatthamrong Boonsongpaisan, Acting Prime minister (2014)
- Prayut Chan-o-cha, de facto Acting Prime minister (2014), Prime minister (2014–2023)

- Timor-Leste

- Presidents (complete list) –

- José Ramos-Horta, President (2008–2012)
- Taur Matan Ruak, President (2012–2017)
- Francisco Guterres, President (2017–2022)

- Prime ministers (complete list) –

- Xanana Gusmão, Prime minister (2007–2015)
- Rui Maria de Araújo, Prime minister (2015–2017)
- Mari Alkatiri, Prime minister (2017–2018)
- Taur Matan Ruak, Prime minister (2018–2023)

- Vietnam

- General Secretaries of the Communist Party (complete list) –

- Nông Đức Mạnh, General Secretary (2001–2011)
- Nguyễn Phú Trọng, General Secretary (2011–2024)
- Tô Lâm, General Secretary (2014–present)

- Presidents (complete list) –

- Nguyễn Minh Triết, President (2006–2011)
- Trương Tấn Sang, President (2011–2016)
- Nguyễn Phú Trọng, Acting President (2016)
- Trần Đại Quang, President (2016–2018)
- Đặng Thị Ngọc Thịnh, Acting President (2018)
- Nguyễn Phú Trọng, President (2018–2021)

- Prime ministers (complete list) –

- Nguyễn Tấn Dũng, Prime minister (2006–2016)
- Nguyễn Xuân Phúc, Prime minister (2016–2021)

=== Asia: South ===
- Afghanistan

- Presidents (complete list) –

- Hamid Karzai, President (2004–2014)
- Ashraf Ghani, President (2014–2021)

- Chief executive officers

- Abdullah Abdullah (2014–2020)

- Bangladesh

- Presidents (complete list) –

- Zillur Rahman, President (2009–2013)
- Mohammad Abdul Hamid, President (2013–2023)

- Prime ministers and Chief advisers (complete list) –

- Sheikh Hasina, Prime minister (2009–2024)

- Bhutan

- Monarchs (complete list) –

- Jigme Khesar Namgyel Wangchuck, Druk Gyalpo (2006–present)

- Prime ministers (complete list) –

- Jigme Thinley, Prime minister (2008–2013)
- Tshering Tobgay, Prime minister (2013–2018)
- Lotay Tshering, Prime minister (2018–2023)

- India

- Presidents (complete list) –

- Pratibha Patil, President (2007–2012)
- Pranab Mukherjee, President (2012–2017)
- Ram Nath Kovind, President (2017–2022)

- Prime ministers (complete list) –

- Manmohan Singh, Prime minister (2004–2014)
- Narendra Modi, Prime minister (2014–present)

- Maldives (complete list) –

- Mohamed Nasheed, President (2008–2012)
- Mohamed Waheed Hassan, President (2012–2013)
- Abdulla Yameen, President (2013–2018)
- Ibrahim Mohamed Solih, President (2018–2023)

- Nepal

- Presidents (complete list) –

- Ram Baran Yadav, President (2008–2015)
- Bidya Devi Bhandari, President (2015–2023)

- Prime ministers (complete list) –

- Madhav Kumar Nepal, Prime minister (2009–2011)
- Jhala Nath Khanal, Prime minister (2011)
- Baburam Bhattarai, Prime minister (2011–2013)
- Khil Raj Regmi, Acting Prime minister (2013–2014)
- Sushil Koirala, Prime minister (2014–2015)
- Khadga Prasad Oli, Prime minister (2015–2016)
- Pushpa Kamal Dahal, Prime minister (2016–2017)
- Sher Bahadur Deuba, Prime minister (2017–2018)
- Khadga Prasad Oli, Prime minister (2018–2021)

- Pakistan

- Presidents (complete list) –

- Asif Ali Zardari, President (2008–2013)
- Mamnoon Hussain, President (2013–2018)
- Arif Alvi, President (2018–2024)

- Prime ministers (complete list) –

- Yousaf Raza Gillani, Prime minister (2008–2012)
- Raja Pervaiz Ashraf, Prime minister (2012–2013)
- Mir Hazar Khan Khoso, Acting Prime minister (2013)
- Nawaz Sharif, Prime minister (2013–2017)
- Shahid Khaqan Abbasi, Prime minister (2017–2018)
- Imran Khan, Prime minister (2018–2022)

- Sri Lanka

- Presidents (complete list) –

- Mahinda Rajapaksa, President (2005–2015)
- Maithripala Sirisena, President (2015–2019)
- Gotabaya Rajapaksa, President (2019–2022)

- Prime ministers (complete list) –

- Ratnasiri Wickremanayake, Prime minister (2005–2010)
- D. M. Jayaratne, Prime minister (2010–2015)
- Ranil Wickremesinghe, Prime minister (2015–2019)
- Mahinda Rajapaksa, Prime minister (2019–2022)

=== Asia: West ===
- Bahrain

- Monarchs (complete list) –

- Hamad bin Isa Al Khalifa, King (2002–present)

- Prime ministers (complete list) –

- Khalifa bin Salman Al Khalifa, Prime minister (1971–2020)

- Cyprus (complete list) –

- Demetris Christofias, President (2008–2013)
- Nicos Anastasiades, President (2013–2023)

- Northern Cyprus

- Presidents (complete list) –

- Mehmet Ali Talat, President (2005–2010)
- Derviş Eroğlu, President (2010–2015)
- Mustafa Akıncı, President (2015–2020)

- Prime ministers (complete list) –

- İrsen Küçük, Prime minister (2010–2013)
- Sibel Siber, Prime minister (2013)
- Özkan Yorgancıoğlu, Prime minister (2013–2015)
- Ömer Kalyoncu, Prime minister (2015–2016)
- Hüseyin Özgürgün, acting Prime minister (2010), Prime minister (2016–2018)
- Tufan Erhürman, Prime minister (2018–2019)
- Ersin Tatar, Prime minister (2019–2020)

- Iran

- Supreme Leaders (complete list) –

- Ali Khamenei, Supreme Leader (1989–2026)

- Presidents (complete list) –

- Mahmoud Ahmadinejad, President (2005–2013)
- Hassan Rouhani, President (2013–2021)

- Iraq

- Presidents (complete list) –

- Jalal Talabani, President (2005–2014)
- Fuad Masum, President (2014–2018)
- Barham Salih, President (2018–2022)

- Prime ministers (complete list) –

- Nouri al-Maliki, Prime minister (2006–2014)
- Haider al-Abadi, Prime minister (2014–2018)
- Adil Abdul-Mahdi, Prime minister (2018–2020)

- Israel

- Heads of state (complete list) –

- Shimon Peres, President (2007–2014)
- Reuven Rivlin, President (2014–2021)

- Prime ministers (complete list) –

- Benjamin Netanyahu, Prime minister (2009–2021)

- Jordan

- Kings (complete list) –

- Abdullah II, King (1999–present)

- Prime ministers (complete list) –

- Samir Rifai, Prime minister (2009–2011)
- Marouf al-Bakhit, Prime minister (2011)
- Awn Shawkat Al-Khasawneh, Prime minister (2011–2012)
- Fayez al-Tarawneh, Prime minister (2012)
- Abdullah Ensour, Prime minister (2012–2016)
- Hani Mulki, Prime minister (2016–2018)
- Omar Razzaz, Prime minister (2018–2020)

- Kuwait

- Monarchs (complete list) –

- Sabah IV, Emir (2006–2020)

- Prime ministers (complete list) –

- Nasser Al-Mohammed, Prime minister (2006–2011)
- Jaber Al-Mubarak, Prime minister (2011–2019)
- Sabah Al-Khalid, Prime minister (2019–2022)

- Lebanon

- Presidents (complete list) –

- Michel Suleiman, President (2008–2014)
- Tammam Salam, Acting President (2014–2016)
- Michel Aoun, President (2016–2022)

- Prime ministers (complete list) –

- Saad Hariri, Prime minister (2009–2011)
- Najib Mikati, Prime minister (2011–2014)
- Tammam Salam, Prime minister (2014–2016)
- Saad Hariri, Prime minister (2016–2020)

- Oman (complete list) –

- Qaboos bin Said, Sultan (1970–2020)

- State of Palestine

- Presidents (complete list) –

- Mahmoud Abbas, Acting President (2005–2008), President (2008–present)

- Prime ministers (complete list) –

- Ismail Haniyeh, Prime minister (2006–2014)
- Salam Fayyad, Prime minister (2007–2013)
- Rami Hamdallah, Prime minister (2013–2019)
- Mohammad Shtayyeh, Prime minister (2019–2024)

- Qatar

- Emirs (complete list) –

- Hamad bin Khalifa Al Thani, Emir (1995–2013)
- Tamim bin Hamad Al Thani, Emir (2013–present)

- Prime ministers (complete list) –

- Hamad bin Jassim, Prime minister (2007–2013)
- Abdullah bin Nasser, Prime minister (2013–2020)

- Saudi Arabia (complete list) –

- Abdullah, King (2005–2015)
- Salman, King (2015–present)

- Syria

- Presidents (complete list) –

- Bashar al-Assad, President (2000–2024)

- Prime ministers (complete list) –

- Muhammad Naji al-Otari, Prime minister (2003–2011)
- Adel Safar, Prime minister (2011–2012)
- Riyad Farid Hijab, Prime minister (2012)
- Omar Ibrahim Ghalawanji, Acting Prime minister (2012)
- Wael Nader al-Halqi, Prime minister (2012–2016)
- Imad Khamis, Prime minister (2016–2020)

- Turkey

- Presidents (complete list) –

- Abdullah Gül, President (2007–2014)
- Recep Tayyip Erdoğan, President (2014–present)

- Prime ministers (complete list) –

- Recep Tayyip Erdoğan, Prime minister (2003–2014)
- Ahmet Davutoğlu, Prime minister (2014–2016)
- Binali Yıldırım, Prime minister (2016–2018)

Prime minister office abolished in 2018.

- United Arab Emirates

- Presidents (complete list) –

- Khalifa bin Zayed Al Nahyan, President (2004–2022)

- Prime ministers (complete list) –

- Mohammed bin Rashid Al Maktoum, Prime minister (2006–present)

- Yemen

- Presidents (complete list) –

- Ali Abdullah Saleh, Chairman of the Presidential Council (1990–1994), President (1994–2012)
- Abdrabbuh Mansur Hadi, Acting President (2011–2012), President (2012–2022)

- Prime ministers (complete list) –

- Ali Muhammad Mujawar, Prime minister (2007–2011)
- Mohammed Basindawa, Prime minister (2011–2014)
- Abdullah Mohsen al-Akwa, Acting Prime minister (2014)
- Khaled Bahah, Prime minister (2014–2016)
- Ahmed Obeid bin Daghr, Prime minister (2016–2018)
- Maeen Abdulmalik Saeed, Prime minister (2018–2024)

- Yemen: Houthi-led Supreme Political Council

- Presidents (complete list) –

- Mohammed Ali al-Houthi, President of the Supreme Revolutionary Committee (2015–2016)
- Saleh Ali al-Sammad, President of the Supreme Political Council (2016–present)

- Prime ministers (complete list) –

- Talal Aklan, Acting Prime minister (2016)
- Abdel-Aziz bin Habtour, Prime minister (2016–present)

== Europe ==
=== Europe: Balkans ===
- Albania

- Chairmen (complete list) –

- Bamir Topi, President (2007–2012)
- Bujar Nishani, President (2012–2017)
- Ilir Meta, President (2017–2022)

- Prime ministers (complete list) –

- Sali Berisha, Prime minister (2005–2013)
- Edi Rama, Prime minister (2013–present)

- Bosnia and Herzegovina

- High Representatives (complete list) –

- Valentin Inzko, High Representative (2009–2021)

- Presidency (complete list) –

- Chairmen of the Presidency (complete list) –

- Željko Komšić, Chairman (2009–2010)
- Haris Silajdžić, Chairman (2010)
- Nebojša Radmanović, Chairman (2010–2011)
- Željko Komšić, Chairman (2011–2012)
- Bakir Izetbegović, Chairman (2012)
- Nebojša Radmanović, Chairman (2012–2013)
- Željko Komšić, Chairman (2013–2014)
- Bakir Izetbegović, Chairman (2014)
- Mladen Ivanić, Chairman (2014–2015)
- Dragan Čović, Chairman (2015–2016)
- Bakir Izetbegović, Chairman (2016)
- Mladen Ivanić, Chairman (2016–2017)
- Dragan Čović, Chairman (2017–2018)
- Bakir Izetbegović, Chairman (2018)
- Milorad Dodik, Chairman (2018–2019)
- Željko Komšić, Chairman (2019–2020)

- Bosniak members of the Presidency (complete list) –

- Haris Silajdžić, Member (2006–2010)
- Bakir Izetbegović, Member (2010–2018)
- Šefik Džaferović, Member (2018–2022)

- Croat members of the Presidency (complete list) –

- Željko Komšić, Member (2006–2014)
- Dragan Čović, Member (2014–2018)
- Željko Komšić, Member (2018–present)

- Serb members of the Presidency (complete list) –

- Nebojša Radmanović, Member (2006–2014)
- Mladen Ivanić, Member (2014–2018)
- Milorad Dodik, Member (2018–2022)

- Chairmen of the Council of Ministers (complete list) –

- Nikola Špirić, Chairman (2007–2012)
- Vjekoslav Bevanda, Chairman (2012–2015)
- Denis Zvizdić, Chairman (2015–2019)
- Zoran Tegeltija, Chairman (2019–2023)

- Bulgaria

- Presidents (complete list) –

- Georgi Parvanov, President (2002–2012)
- Rosen Plevneliev, President (2012–2017)
- Rumen Radev, President (2017–2026)

- Prime ministers (complete list) –

- Boyko Borisov, Prime minister (2009–2013)
- Marin Raykov, Acting Prime minister (2013)
- Plamen Oresharski, Prime minister (2013–2014)
- Georgi Bliznashki, Acting Prime minister (2014)
- Boyko Borisov, Prime minister (2014–2017)
- Ognyan Gerdzhikov, Acting Prime minister (2017)
- Boyko Borisov, Prime minister (2017–2021)

- Croatia

- Presidents (complete list) –

- Stjepan Mesić, President (2000–2010)
- Ivo Josipović, President (2010–2015)
- Kolinda Grabar-Kitarović, President (2015–2020)

- Prime ministers (complete list) –

- Jadranka Kosor, Prime minister (2009–2011)
- Zoran Milanović, Prime minister (2011–2016)
- Tihomir Orešković, Prime minister (2016)
- Andrej Plenković, Prime minister (2016–present)

- Greece

- Presidents (complete list) –

- Karolos Papoulias, President (2005–2015)
- Prokopis Pavlopoulos, President (2015–2020)

- Prime ministers (complete list) –

- George Papandreou, Prime minister (2009–2011)
- Lucas Papademos, Prime minister (2011–2012)
- Panagiotis Pikrammenos, Interim Prime minister (2012)
- Antonis Samaras, Prime minister (2012–2015)
- Alexis Tsipras, Prime minister (2015)
- Vassiliki Thanou-Christophilou, Interim Prime minister (2015)
- Alexis Tsipras, Prime minister (2015–2019)
- Kyriakos Mitsotakis, Prime minister (2019–2023)

- UN-administered Kosovo

- Presidents (complete list) –

- Fatmir Sejdiu, President (2006–2010)

- Republic of Kosovo

- Presidents (complete list) –

- Fatmir Sejdiu, President (2008–2010)
- Jakup Krasniqi, Acting President (2010–2011)
- Behgjet Pacolli, President (2011)
- Jakup Krasniqi, Acting President (2011)
- Atifete Jahjaga, President (2011–2016)
- Hashim Thaçi, President (2016–2020)

- Prime ministers (complete list) –

- Hashim Thaçi, Prime minister (2008–2014)
- Isa Mustafa, Prime minister (2014–2017)
- Ramush Haradinaj, Prime minister (2017–2020)

- Montenegro

- Presidents (complete list) –

- Filip Vujanović, President (2006–2018)
- Milo Đukanović, President (2018–2023)

- Prime ministers (complete list) –

- Milo Đukanović, Prime minister (2008–2010)
- Igor Lukšić, Prime minister (2010–2012)
- Milo Đukanović, Prime minister (2012–2016)
- Duško Marković, Prime minister (2016–2020)

- North Macedonia (Note: the (Former Yugoslav) Republic of Macedonia before 2019)

- Presidents (complete list) –

- Gjorge Ivanov, President (2009–2019)
- Stevo Pendarovski, President (2019–2024)

- Prime ministers (complete list) –

- Nikola Gruevski, Prime minister (2006–2016)
- Emil Dimitriev, Prime minister (2016–2017)
- Zoran Zaev, Prime minister (2017–2020)

- Romania

- Presidents (complete list) –

- Traian Băsescu, President (2007–2012)
- Crin Antonescu, Interim President (2012)
- Traian Băsescu, President (2012–2014)
- Klaus Iohannis, President (2014–2025)

- Prime ministers (complete list) –

- Emil Boc, Prime minister (2008–2012)
- Cătălin Predoiu, Interim Prime minister (2012)
- Mihai Răzvan Ungureanu, Prime minister (2012)
- Victor Ponta, Prime minister (2012–2015)
- Gabriel Oprea, Interim Prime minister (2015)
- Victor Ponta, Prime minister (2015)
- Sorin Cîmpeanu, Interim Prime minister (2015)
- Dacian Cioloș, Prime minister (2015–2017)
- Sorin Grindeanu, Prime minister (2017)
- Mihai Tudose, Prime minister (2017–2018)
- Mihai Fifor, Interim Prime minister (2018)
- Viorica Dăncilă, Prime minister (2018–2019)
- Ludovic Orban, Prime minister (2019–2020)

- Serbia

- Presidents (complete list) –

- Boris Tadić, President (2004–2012)
- Slavica Đukić Dejanović, Acting President (2012)
- Tomislav Nikolić, President (2012–2017)
- Aleksandar Vučić, President (2017–2026)

- Prime ministers (complete list) –

- Mirko Cvetković, Prime minister (2008–2012)
- Ivica Dačić, Prime minister (2012–2014)
- Aleksandar Vučić, Prime minister (2014–2017)
- Ivica Dačić, Acting Prime minister (2017)
- Ana Brnabić, Prime minister (2017–2024)

- Slovenia

- Presidents (complete list) –

- Danilo Türk, President (2007–2012)
- Borut Pahor, President (2012–2022)

- Prime ministers (complete list) –

- Borut Pahor, Prime minister (2008–2012)
- Janez Janša, Prime minister (2012–2013)
- Alenka Bratušek, Prime minister (2013–2014)
- Miro Cerar, Prime minister (2014–2018)
- Marjan Šarec, Prime minister (2018–2020)

=== Europe: Baltic states ===
- Estonia

- Presidents (complete list) –

- Toomas Hendrik Ilves, President (2006–2016)
- Kersti Kaljulaid, President (2016–2021)

- Prime ministers (complete list) –

- Andrus Ansip, Prime minister (2005–2014)
- Taavi Rõivas, Prime minister (2014–2016)
- Jüri Ratas, Prime minister (2016–2021)

- Latvia

- Presidents (complete list) –

- Valdis Zatlers, President (2007–2011)
- Andris Bērziņš, President (2011–2015)
- Raimonds Vējonis, President (2015–2019)
- Egils Levits, President (2019–2023)

- Prime ministers (complete list) –

- Valdis Dombrovskis, Prime minister (2009–2014)
- Laimdota Straujuma, Prime minister (2014–2016)
- Māris Kučinskis, Prime minister (2016–2019)
- Krišjānis Kariņš, Prime minister (2019–2023)

- Lithuania

- Presidents (complete list) –

- Dalia Grybauskaitė, President (2009–2019)
- Gitanas Nausėda, President (2019–present)

- Prime ministers (complete list) –

- Andrius Kubilius, Prime minister (2008–2012)
- Algirdas Butkevičius, Prime minister (2012–2016)
- Saulius Skvernelis, Prime minister (2016–2020)

=== Europe: British and Ireland ===
- Republic of Ireland

- Presidents (complete list) –

- Mary McAleese, President (1997–2011)
- Michael D. Higgins, President (2011–2025)

- Taoiseachs (complete list) –

- Brian Cowen, Taoiseach (2008–2011)
- Enda Kenny, Taoiseach (2011–2017)
- Leo Varadkar, Taoiseach (2017–2020)

- United Kingdom

- Monarchs (complete list) –

- Elizabeth II, Queen (1952–2022)

- Prime Ministers (complete list) –

- Gordon Brown, Prime Minister (2007–2010)
- David Cameron, Prime Minister (2010–2016)
- Theresa May, Prime Minister (2016–2019)
- Boris Johnson, Prime Minister (2019–2022)

=== Europe: Central ===
- Austria

- Presidents (complete list) –

- Heinz Fischer, President (2004–2016)
- Doris Bures, Karlheinz Kopf, Norbert Hofer, Joint Acting Presidents (2016–2017)
- Alexander Van der Bellen, President (2017–present)

- Chancellors (complete list) –

- Werner Faymann, Chancellor (2008–2016)
- Reinhold Mitterlehner, Acting Chancellor (2016)
- Christian Kern, Chancellor (2016–2017)
- Sebastian Kurz, Chancellor (2017–2019)
- Brigitte Bierlein, Chancellor (2019–2020)

- Czech Republic

- Presidents (complete list) –

- Václav Klaus, President (2003–2013)
- Miloš Zeman, President (2013–2023)

- Prime ministers (complete list) –

- Jan Fischer, Prime Minister (2009–2010)
- Petr Nečas, Prime Minister (2010–2013)
- Jiří Rusnok, Prime Minister (2013–2014)
- Bohuslav Sobotka, Prime Minister (2014–2017)
- Andrej Babiš, Prime Minister (2017–2021)

- Germany

- Presidents (complete list) –

- Horst Köhler, President (2004–2010)
- Christian Wulff, President (2010–2012)
- Joachim Gauck, President (2012–2017)
- Frank-Walter Steinmeier, President (2017–present)

- Chancellors (complete list) –

- Angela Merkel, Chancellor (2005–2021)

- Hungary

- Presidents (complete list) –

- László Sólyom, President (2005–2010)
- Pál Schmitt, President (2010–2012)
- László Kövér, Acting President (2012)
- János Áder, President (2012–2022)

- Prime ministers (complete list) –

- Gordon Bajnai, Prime minister (2009–2010)
- Viktor Orbán, Prime minister (2010–2026)

- Liechtenstein

- Sovereign Princes (complete list) –

- Hans-Adam II, Prince (1989–present)

- Prime ministers (complete list) –

- Klaus Tschütscher, Prime minister (2009–2013)
- Adrian Hasler, Prime minister (2013–2021)

- Poland

- Presidents (complete list) –

- Lech Kaczyński, President (2005–2010)
- Bronisław Komorowski, Acting President (2010)
- Bogdan Borusewicz, Acting President (2010)
- Grzegorz Schetyna, Acting President (2010)
- Bronisław Komorowski, President (2010–2015)
- Andrzej Duda, President (2015–2025)

- Prime ministers (complete list) –

- Donald Tusk, Prime minister (2007–2014)
- Ewa Kopacz, Prime minister (2014–2015)
- Beata Szydło, Prime minister (2015–2017)
- Mateusz Morawiecki, Prime minister (2017–2023)

- Slovakia

- Presidents (complete list) –

- Ivan Gašparovič, President (2004–2014)
- Andrej Kiska, President (2014–2019)
- Zuzana Čaputová, President (2019–2024)

- Prime ministers (complete list) –

- Robert Fico, Prime minister (2006–2010)
- Iveta Radičová, Prime minister (2010–2012)
- Robert Fico, Prime minister (2012–2018)
- Peter Pellegrini, Prime minister (2018–2020)

- Switzerland (complete list) –

- Doris Leuthard, President of the Confederation (2010)
- Micheline Calmy-Rey, President of the Confederation (2011)
- Eveline Widmer-Schlumpf, President of the Confederation (2012)
- Ueli Maurer, President of the Confederation (2013)
- Didier Burkhalter, President of the Confederation (2014)
- Simonetta Sommaruga, President of the Confederation (2015)
- Johann Schneider-Ammann, President of the Confederation (2016)
- Doris Leuthard, President of the Confederation (2017)
- Alain Berset, President of the Confederation (2018)
- Ueli Maurer, President of the Confederation (2019)

=== Europe: East ===
- Belarus

- Presidents (complete list) –

- Alexander Lukashenko, President (1994–present)

- Prime ministers (complete list) –

- Sergei Sidorsky, Prime minister (2003–2010)
- Mikhail Myasnikovich, Prime minister (2010–2014)
- Andrei Kobyakov, Prime minister (2014–2018)
- Syarhey Rumas, Prime minister (2018–2020)

- Moldova

- Presidents (complete list) –

- Mihai Ghimpu, Acting President (2009–2010)
- Vlad Filat, Acting President (2010)
- Marian Lupu, Acting President (2010–2012)
- Nicolae Timofti, President (2012–2016)
- Igor Dodon, President (2016–2020)

- Prime ministers (complete list) –

- Vlad Filat, Prime minister (2009–2013)
- Iurie Leancă, Prime minister (2013–2015)
- Chiril Gaburici, Prime minister (2015)
- Natalia Gherman, Acting Prime minister (2015)
- Valeriu Streleț, Prime minister (2015)
- Gheorghe Brega, Acting Prime minister (2015–2016)
- Pavel Filip, Prime minister (2016–2019)
- Maia Sandu, Prime minister (2019)
- Ion Chicu, Prime minister (2019–2021)

- Russia

- Presidents (complete list) –

- Dmitry Medvedev, President (2008–2012)
- Vladimir Putin, Acting President (1999–2000), President (2000–2008, 2012–present)

- Prime ministers (complete list) –

- Vladimir Putin, Prime minister (2008–2012)
- Viktor Zubkov, Prime minister (2012)
- Dmitry Medvedev, Prime minister (2012–2020)

- Transnistria

- Presidents (complete list) –

- Igor Smirnov, Chairman of the Republic (1991), President (1991–2011)
- Yevgeny Shevchuk, President (2011–2016)
- Vadim Krasnoselsky, President (2016–present)

- Prime ministers (complete list) –

- Pyotr Stepanov, Prime minister (2012–2013)
- Tatiana Turanskaya, Prime minister (2013–2015)
- Maija Parnas, Acting Prime Minister (2015)
- Tatiana Turanskaya, Prime minister (2015)
- Maija Parnas, Acting Prime Minister (2015)
- Pavel Prokudin, Prime minister (2015–2016)
- Aleksandr Martynov, Prime minister (2016–2022)

- Ukraine

- Presidents (complete list) –

- Viktor Yushchenko, President (2005–2010)
- Viktor Yanukovych, President (2010–2014)
- Oleksandr Turchynov, Acting President (2014)
- Petro Poroshenko, President (2014–2019)
- Volodymyr Zelenskyy, President (2019–present)

- Prime ministers (complete list) –

- Yulia Tymoshenko, Prime minister (2007–2010)
- Oleksandr Turchynov, Acting Prime minister (2010)
- Mykola Azarov, Prime minister (2010–2014)
- Serhiy Arbuzov, Acting Prime minister (2014)
- Oleksandr Turchynov, Acting Prime minister (2014)
- Arseniy Yatsenyuk, Prime minister (2014–2016)
- Volodymyr Groysman, Prime minister (2016–2019)
- Oleksiy Honcharuk, Prime minister (2019–2020)

=== Europe: Nordic ===
- Denmark

- Monarchs (complete list) –

- Margrethe II, Queen (1972–2024)

- Prime ministers (complete list) –

- Lars Løkke Rasmussen, Prime minister (2009–2011)
- Helle Thorning-Schmidt, Prime minister (2011–2015)
- Lars Løkke Rasmussen, Prime minister (2015–2019)
- Mette Frederiksen, Prime minister (2019–present)

- Finland

- Presidents (complete list) –

- Tarja Halonen, President (2000–2012)
- Sauli Niinistö, President (2012–2024)

- Prime ministers (complete list) –

- Matti Vanhanen, Prime minister (2003–2010)
- Mari Kiviniemi, Prime minister (2010–2011)
- Jyrki Katainen, Prime minister (2011–2014)
- Alexander Stubb, Prime minister (2014–2015)
- Juha Sipilä, Prime minister (2015–2019)
- Antti Rinne, Prime minister (2019)
- Sanna Marin, Prime minister (2019–2023)

- Iceland

- Presidents (complete list) –

- Ólafur Ragnar Grímsson, President (1996–2016)
- Guðni Th. Jóhannesson, President (2016–2024)

- Prime ministers (complete list) –

- Jóhanna Sigurðardóttir, Prime minister (2009–2013)
- Sigmundur Davíð Gunnlaugsson, Prime minister (2013–2016)
- Sigurður Ingi Jóhannsson, Prime minister (2016–2017)
- Bjarni Benediktsson, Prime minister (2017)
- Katrín Jakobsdóttir, Prime minister (2017–2024)

- Norway

- Monarchs (complete list) –

- Harald V, King (1991–2026)

- Prime ministers (complete list) –

- Jens Stoltenberg, Prime minister (2005–2013)
- Erna Solberg, Prime minister (2013–2021)

- Sweden

- Monarchs (complete list) –

- Carl XVI Gustaf, King (1973–present)

- Prime ministers (complete list) –

- Fredrik Reinfeldt, Prime minister (2006–2014)
- Stefan Löfven, Prime minister (2014–2021)

=== Europe: Southcentral ===
- Italy

- Presidents (complete list) –

- Giorgio Napolitano, President (2006–2015)
- Sergio Mattarella, President (2015–present)

- Prime ministers (complete list) –

- Silvio Berlusconi, Prime minister (2008–2011)
- Mario Monti, Prime minister (2011–2013)
- Enrico Letta, Prime minister (2013–2014)
- Matteo Renzi, Prime minister (2014–2016)
- Paolo Gentiloni, Prime minister (2016–2018)
- Giuseppe Conte, Prime Minister (2018–2021)

- Malta

- Presidents (complete list) –

- George Abela, President (2009–2014)
- Marie-Louise Coleiro Preca, President (2014–2019)
- George Vella, President (2019–2024)

- Prime ministers (complete list) –

- Lawrence Gonzi, Prime minister (2004–2013)
- Joseph Muscat, Prime minister (2013–2020)

- San Marino

- Captains Regent (1900–present) –

- Stefano Palmieri, Francesco Mussoni, Captains Regent (2009–2010)
- Marco Conti, Glauco Sansovini, Captains Regent (2010)
- Giovanni Francesco Ugolini, Andrea Zafferani, Captains Regent (2010–2011)
- Maria Luisa Berti, Filippo Tamagnini, Captains Regent (2011)
- Gabriele Gatti, Matteo Fiorini, Captains Regent (2011–2012)
- Italo Righi, Maurizio Rattini, Captains Regent (2012)
- Teodoro Lonfernini, Denise Bronzetti, Captains Regent (2012–2013)
- Antonella Mularoni, Denis Amici, Captains Regent (2013)
- Gian Carlo Capicchioni, Anna Maria Muccioli, Captains Regent (2013–2014)
- Valeria Ciavatta, Luca Beccari, Captains Regent (2014)
- Gianfranco Terenzi, Guerrino Zanotti, Captains Regent (2014–2015)
- Andrea Belluzzi, Roberto Venturini, Captains Regent (2015)
- Lorella Stefanelli, Nicola Renzi, Captains Regent (2015–2016)
- Massimo Andrea Ugolini, Gian Nicola Berti, Captains Regent (2016)
- Marino Riccardi, Fabio Berardi, Captains Regent (2016–2017)
- Mimma Zavoli, Vanessa D'Ambrosio, Captains Regent (2017)
- Enrico Carattoni, Matteo Fiorini, Captains Regent (2017–2018)
- Stefano Palmieri, Matteo Ciacci, Captains Regent (2018)
- Mirko Tomassoni, Luca Santolini, Captains Regent (2018–2019)
- Nicola Selva, Michele Muratori, Captains Regent (2019)
- Luca Boschi, Mariella Mularoni, Captains Regent (2019–2020)

- Vatican City

- Sovereign (complete list) –

- Benedict XVI, Sovereign (2005–2013)
- Francis, Sovereign (2013–2025)

- President of the Governorate (complete list) –

- Giovanni Lajolo, President of the Governorate (2006–2011)
- Giuseppe Bertello, President of the Governorate (2011–2021)

=== Europe: Southwest ===
- Andorra

- Episcopal Co-Princes (complete list) –

- Joan Enric Vives Sicília, Episcopal Co-Prince (2003–2025)

- French Co-Princes (complete list) –

- Nicolas Sarkozy, French Co-Prince (2007–2012)
- François Hollande, French Co-Prince (2012–2017)
- Emmanuel Macron, French Co-Prince (2017–present)

- Prime ministers (complete list) –

- Jaume Bartumeu, Prime minister (2009–2011)
- Pere López Agràs, Acting Prime minister (2011)
- Antoni Martí, Prime minister (2011–2019)
- Xavier Espot, Prime minister (2019–present)

- Portugal

- Presidents (complete list) –

- Aníbal Cavaco Silva, President (2006–2016)
- Marcelo Rebelo de Sousa, President (2016–present)

- Prime ministers (complete list) –

- José Sócrates, Prime minister (2005–2011)
- Pedro Passos Coelho, Prime minister (2011–2015)
- António Costa, Prime minister (2015–2024)

- Spain

- Monarchs (complete list) –

- Juan Carlos I, King (1975–2014)
- Felipe VI, King (2014–present)

- Prime ministers (complete list) –

- José Luis Rodríguez Zapatero, Prime minister (2004–2011)
- Mariano Rajoy, Prime minister (2011–2018)
- Pedro Sánchez, Prime Minister (2018–present)

=== Europe: West ===
- Belgium

- Monarchs (complete list) –

- Albert II, King (1993–2013)
- Philippe, King (2013–present)

- Prime ministers (complete list) –

- Yves Leterme, Prime minister (2009–2011)
- Elio Di Rupo, Prime minister (2011–2014)
- Charles Michel, Prime minister (2014–2019)
- Sophie Wilmès, Prime minister (2019–2020)

- France: Fifth Republic

- Presidents (complete list) –

- Nicolas Sarkozy, President (2007–2012)
- François Hollande, President (2012–2017)
- Emmanuel Macron, President (2017–present)

- Prime ministers (complete list) –

- François Fillon, Prime minister (2007–2012)
- Jean-Marc Ayrault, Prime minister (2012–2014)
- Manuel Valls, Prime minister (2014–2016)
- Bernard Cazeneuve, Prime minister (2016–2017)
- Édouard Philippe, Prime minister (2017–2020)

- Luxembourg

- Monarchs (complete list) –

- Henri, Grand Duke (2000–2025)

- Prime ministers (complete list) –

- Jean-Claude Juncker, Prime minister (1995–2013)
- Xavier Bettel, Prime minister (2013–2023)

- Monaco

- Sovereign Prince (complete list) –

- Albert II, Prince (2005–present)

- Minister of State (complete list) –

- Jean-Paul Proust, Minister of state (2005–2010)
- Michel Roger, Minister of state (2010–2015)
- Gilles Tonelli, Acting Minister of state (2015–2016)
- Serge Telle, Minister of State (2016–2020)
- Pierre Dartout, Minister of State (2020–2024)

- The Netherlands

- Monarchs (complete list) –

- Beatrix, Queen (1980–2013)
- Willem-Alexander, King (2013–present)

- Prime ministers of the Netherlands; Chairman of the Council of Ministers of the Kingdom of the Netherlands (complete list) –

- Jan Peter Balkenende, Prime minister (2002–2010)
- Mark Rutte, Prime minister (2010–2024)

=== Eurasia: Caucasus ===
- Abkhazia

- Presidents (complete list) –

- Sergei Bagapsh, President (2005–2011)
- Alexander Ankvab, Acting President (2011), President (2011–2014)
- Valeri Bganba, Acting President (2014)
- Raul Khajimba, President (2014–2020)

- Prime ministers (complete list) –

- Alexander Ankvab, Prime minister (2005–2010)
- Sergei Shamba, Prime minister (2010–2011)
- Leonid Lakerbaia, Prime minister (2011–2014)
- Vladimir Delba, Acting Prime minister (2014)
- Beslan Butba, Prime minister (2014–2015)
- Shamil Adzynba, Acting Prime minister (2015)
- Artur Mikvabia, Prime minister (2015–2016)
- Shamil Adzynba, Acting Prime minister (2016)
- Beslan Bartsits, Prime minister (2016–2018)
- Gennadi Gagulia, Prime minister (2018)
- Daur Arshba, Acting Prime minister (2018)
- Valeri Bganba, Prime minister (2018–2020)

- Armenia

- Presidents (complete list) –

- Serzh Sargsyan, President (2008–2018)
- Armen Sarkissian, President (2018–2022)

- Prime ministers (complete list) –

- Tigran Sargsyan, Prime minister (2008–2014)
- Hovik Abrahamyan, Prime minister (2014–2016)
- Karen Karapetyan, Prime minister (2016–2018)
- Serzh Sargsyan, Prime minister (2018)
- Karen Karapetyan, Acting prime minister (2018)
- Nikol Pashinyan, Prime minister (2018–present)

- Republic of Artsakh (Note: the Republic of Nagorno-Karabakh before 2017, used alongside since 2017)

- Presidents (complete list) –

- Bako Sahakyan, President (2007–2020)

- Presidents of the National Assembly (complete list) –

- Ashot Ghulian, President of the National Assembly (2005–2020)

- Azerbaijan

- Presidents (complete list) –

- Ilham Aliyev, President (2003–present)

- Prime ministers (complete list) –

- Artur Rasizade, Prime minister (2003–2018)
- Novruz Mammadov, Prime minister (2018–2019)
- Ali Asadov, Prime minister (2019–present)

- Georgia

- Presidents (complete list) –

- Mikheil Saakashvili, President (2008–2013)
- Giorgi Margvelashvili, President (2013–2018)
- Salome Zourabichvili, President (2018–2024)

- Heads of government (complete list) –

- Nika Gilauri, Prime minister (2009–2012)
- Vano Merabishvili, Prime minister (2012)
- Bidzina Ivanishvili, Prime minister (2012–2013)
- Irakli Garibashvili, Prime minister (2013–2015)
- Giorgi Kvirikashvili, Prime minister (2015–2018)
- Mamuka Bakhtadze, Prime minister (2018–2019)
- Giorgi Gakharia, Prime minister (2019–2021)

- South Ossetia

- Presidents (complete list) –

- Eduard Kokoity, President (2001–2011)
- Vadim Brovtsev, Acting President (2011–2012)
- Leonid Tibilov, President (2012–2017)
- Anatoly Bibilov, President (2017–2022)

- Prime ministers (complete list) –

- Vadim Brovtsev, Prime minister (2009–2012)
- Rostislav Khugayev, Prime minister (2012–2014)
- Domenty Kulumbegov, Prime minister (2014–2017)
- Erik Pukhayev, Prime minister (2017–2020)

== Oceania ==
=== Oceania: Australia and Papua New Guinea ===
- Australia

- Monarchs (complete list) –

- Elizabeth II, Queen (1952–2022)

- Prime ministers (complete list) –

- Kevin Rudd, Prime minister (2007–2010)
- Julia Gillard, Prime minister (2010–2013)
- Kevin Rudd, Prime minister (2013)
- Tony Abbott, Prime minister (2013–2015)
- Malcolm Turnbull, Prime minister (2015–2018)
- Scott Morrison, Prime minister (2018–2022)

- Papua New Guinea

- Monarchs (complete list) –

- Elizabeth II, Queen (1975–2022)

- Prime ministers (complete list) –

- Michael Somare, Prime minister (2002–2012)
- Sam Abal, Acting Prime minister (2010–2011)
- Michael Somare, Prime minister (2011)
- Sam Abal, Acting Prime minister (2011)
- Peter O'Neill, Prime minister (2011–2019)
- James Marape, Prime minister (2019–present)

=== Oceania: Pacific ===
- Cook Islands, state in free association

- Monarchs (complete list) –

- Elizabeth II, Queen (1975–2022)

- Prime ministers

- Jim Marurai, Prime minister (2004–2010)
- Henry Puna, Prime minister (2010–2020)

- Fiji

- Heads of state (complete list) –

- Epeli Nailatikau, President (2009–2015)
- Jioji Konrote, President (2015–2021)

- Prime ministers (complete list) –

- Frank Bainimarama, Acting Prime minister (2007–2014), Prime minister (2014–2022)

- Kiribati (complete list) –

- Anote Tong, President (2003–2016)
- Taneti Mamau, President (2016–present)

- Marshall Islands (complete list) –

- Jurelang Zedkaia, President (2009–2012)
- Christopher Loeak, President (2012–2016)
- Casten Nemra, President (2016)
- Hilda Heine, President (2016–2020)

- Federated States of Micronesia (complete list) –

- Manny Mori, President (2007–2015)
- Peter M. Christian, President (2015–2019)
- David Panuelo, President (2019–2023)

- Nauru (complete list) –

- Marcus Stephen, President (2007–2011)
- Freddie Pitcher, President (2011)
- Sprent Dabwido, President (2011–2013)
- Baron Waqa, President (2013–2019)
- Lionel Aingimea, President (2019–2022)

- New Zealand

- Monarchs (complete list) –

- Elizabeth II, Queen (1952–2022)

- Prime ministers (complete list) –

- John Key, Prime minister (2008–2016)
- Bill English, Prime minister (2016–2017)
- Jacinda Ardern, Prime minister (2017–2023)

- Palau (complete list) –

- Johnson Toribiong, President (2009–2013)
- Tommy Remengesau Jr., President (2013–2021)

- Samoa

- Heads of state (complete list) –

- Tui Ātua Tupua Tamasese Efi, O le Ao o le Malo (2007–2017)
- Tuimalealiʻifano Vaʻaletoʻa Sualauvi II, O le Ao o le Malo (2017–present)

- Prime ministers (complete list) –

- Tuila'epa Sa'ilele Malielegaoi, Prime minister (1998–2021)

- Solomon Islands

- Monarchs (complete list) –

- Elizabeth II, Queen (1978–2022)

- Prime ministers (complete list) –

- Derek Sikua, Prime minister (2007–2010)
- Danny Philip, Prime minister (2010–2011)
- Gordon Darcy Lilo, Prime minister (2011–2014)
- Manasseh Sogavare, Prime minister (2014–2017)
- Rick Houenipwela, Prime minister (2017–2019)
- Manasseh Sogavare, Prime minister (2019–2024)

- Tonga

- Monarchs (complete list) –

- George Tupou V, King (2006–2012)
- Tupou VI, King (2012–present)

- Prime ministers (complete list) –

- Tupou VI, then known as ʻAhoʻeitu ʻUnuakiʻotonga Tukuʻaho, Prime minister (2000–2006)
- Feleti Sevele, Prime minister (2006–2010)
- Sialeʻataongo Tuʻivakanō, Prime minister (2010–2014)
- ʻAkilisi Pōhiva, Prime minister (2014–2019)
- Semisi Sika, Acting Prime minister (2019)
- Pōhiva Tuʻiʻonetoa, Prime minister (2019–2021)

- Tuvalu

- Monarchs (complete list) –

- Elizabeth II, Queen (1978–2022)

- Prime ministers (complete list) –

- Apisai Ielemia, Prime minister (2006–2010)
- Maatia Toafa, Prime minister (2010)
- Willy Telavi, Prime minister (2010–2013)
- Enele Sopoaga, Prime minister (2013–2019)
- Kausea Natano, Prime minister (2019–2024)

- Vanuatu

- Presidents (complete list) –

- Iolu Abil, President (2009–2014)
- Philip Boedoro, Acting President (2014)
- Baldwin Lonsdale, President (2014–2017)
- Esmon Saimon, Acting President (2017)
- Tallis Obed Moses, President (2017–2022)

- Prime ministers (complete list) –

- Edward Natapei, Prime minister (2009–2010)
- Sato Kilman, Prime minister (2010–2011)
- Serge Vohor, Prime minister (2011)
- Sato Kilman, Prime minister (2011)
- Edward Natapei, Acting Prime minister (2011)
- Sato Kilman, Prime minister (2011–2013)
- Moana Carcasses Kalosil, Prime minister (2013–2014)
- Joe Natuman, Prime minister (2014–2015)
- Sato Kilman, Prime minister (2015–2016)
- Charlot Salwai, Prime minister (2016–2020)

== See also ==
- List of state leaders in the 20th century (1951–2000)
- List of state leaders in the 2000s
- List of state leaders in the 2020s
- List of current heads of state and government
- List of governors of dependent territories in the 21st century
