= Antonella Mularoni =

Sammarinese politician

Antonella Mularoni OMRI
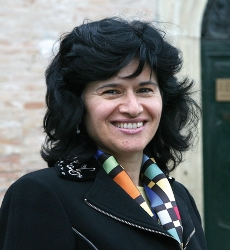
- Mularoni in 2009

Captain Regent of San Marino
- In office 1 April 2013 – 1 October 2013; Served with Denis Amici
- Preceded by: Teodoro Lonfernini; Denise Bronzetti
- Succeeded by: Gian Carlo Capicchioni; Anna Maria Muccioli

Secretary for Territory and Environment (Note: Styled as Secretary of State for Territory, Environment, Agriculture, Telecommunications, International Economic Cooperation, Civil Protection and Relations with the AASLP.)
- In office 17 April 2014 – 24 August 2016
- Preceded by: Matteo Fiorini
- Succeeded by: Augusto Michelotti

President of Popular Alliance
- In office 2 March 2013 – 13 January 2016
- Coordinator: Nicola Renzi
- Preceded by: Mario Venturini
- Succeeded by: Diego Ercolani

Secretary for Foreign and Political Affairs
- In office 3 December 2008 – 5 December 2012
- Preceded by: Fiorenzo Stolfi
- Succeeded by: Pasquale Valentini

Judge of the European Court of Human Rights
- In office 1 November 2001 – September 2008
- Nominated by: Government of San Marino
- Appointed by: Council of Europe
- Succeeded by: Kristina Pardalos

Additional positions
- 2008–present: Member of the Grand and General Council
- 1993–2001: Member of the Grand and General Council

Personal details
- Born: 27 September 1961 (age 65) San Marino, San Marino
- Party: Future Republic (Since 2017)
- Other political affiliations: PDCS (1986–1993); Popular Alliance (1993–2017)
- Education: University of Bologna (LL.B)

Antonella Mularoni (born 27 September 1961) is a Sammarinese jurist and politician who served as Captain Regent from April to October 2013, alongside Denis Amici. A member of Future Republic, she previously served as Secretary of State for Foreign and Political Affairs from 2008 to 2012 and as the Sammarinese judge for the European Court of Human Rights between 2001 and 2008.

== Biography ==
In 1986, Mularoni graduated in law from the University of Bologna and joined the Sammarinese Christian Democratic Party, initially as a member of the youth section and later of the central committee, where she focused on equal opportunities and family policies. That same year, the Grand and General Council approved the new family law.

From 1986 to 1987, she held a position at the Secretariat of State for Finance, Budget and Economic Planning. From June 1987 to December 1990, she served as the director of the Office for Relations with the Sammarinese Communities Abroad. During this time, Mularoni also worked as an associate of the Permanent Representative of the Republic of San Marino to the Council of Europe from October 1989 to December 1990.

In January 1993, she was a founding member of the newly formed Popular Alliance of Sammarinese Democrats and was elected for the first time to the Grand and General Council as a representative of the party, a position she held until 2001. She was then elected by the Parliamentary Assembly of the Council of Europe as a judge of the European Court of Human Rights based in Strasbourg for the 2001–2007 term, continuing to carry out her duties on the court until September 2008. Mularoni was succeeded by fellow Sammarinese judge Kristina Pardalos.

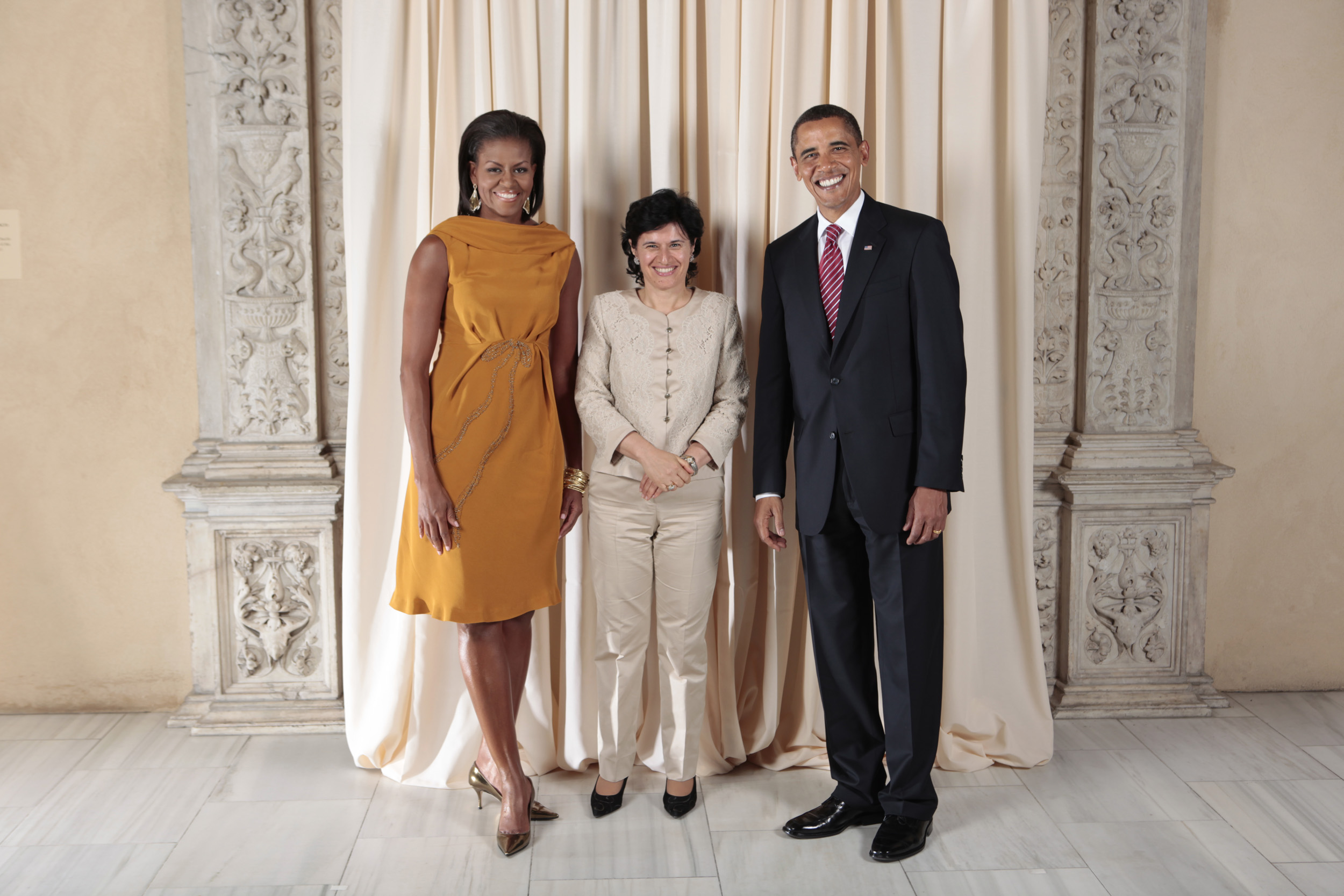
Mularoni with U.S. President Barack Obama and First Lady Michelle Obama during a reception in September 2009

In 2008, following the expiration of her mandate at the ECHR, she ran with the Popular Alliance and was elected to the Grand and General Council with the support of the Pact for San Marino, a center-right coalition of which the Popular Alliance was a part. She subsequently served as Secretary for Foreign and Political Affairs, Telecommunications, and Transport in the XXVII Legislature from 2008 to 2012.

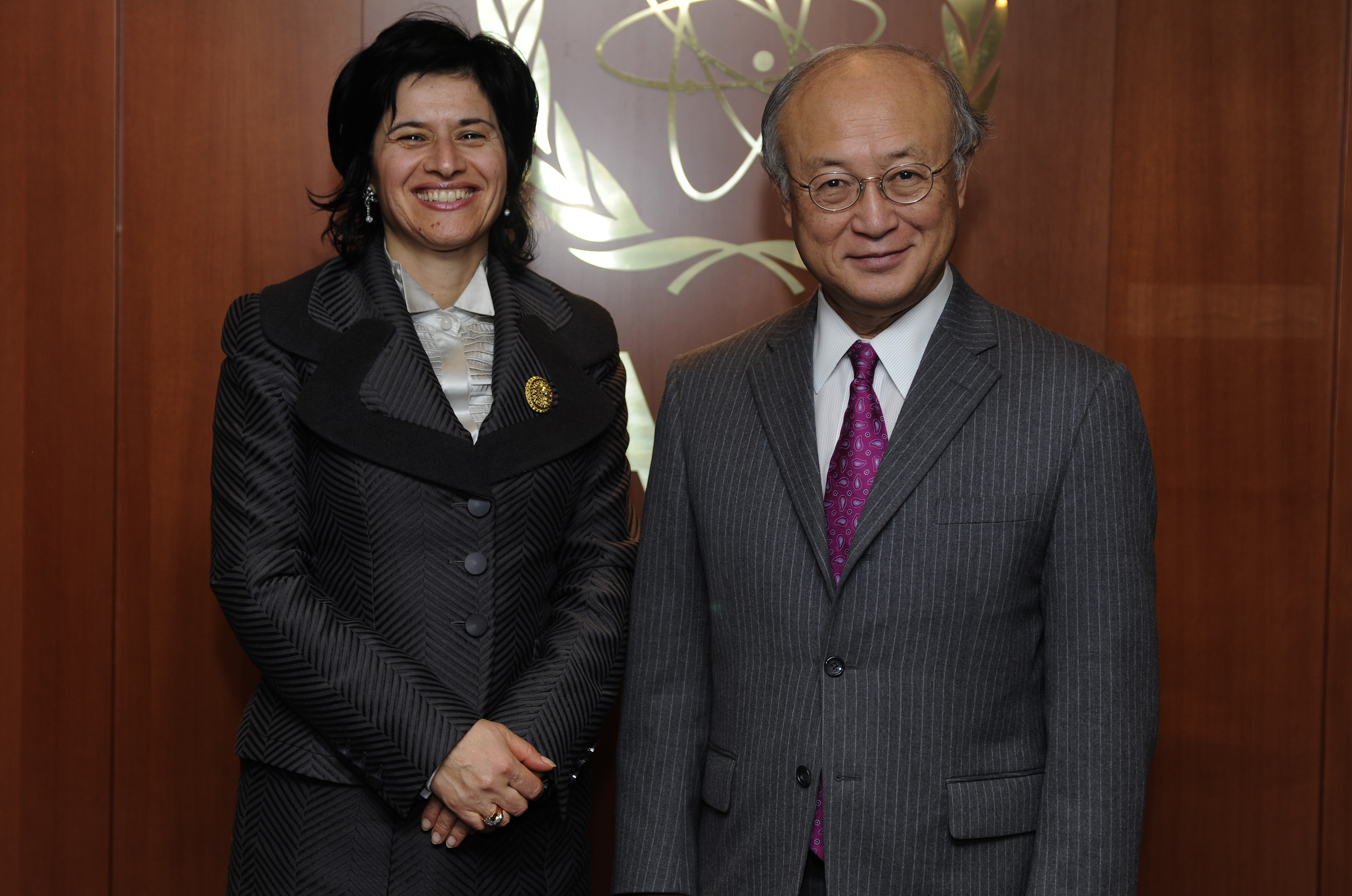
Mularoni at a 2011 meeting with IAEA Director General Yukiya Amano in Vienna, Austria

For the 2012 general election, the Popular Alliance formed the San Marino Common Good alliance with the Sammarinese Christian Democratic Party, the Party of Socialists and Democrats, and We Sammarineses, which secured a parliamentary majority, with Mularoni keeping her seat. She was elected President of the Popular Alliance on 2 March 2013 On 21 March, she was elected together with Denis Amici of the PDCS as Captain Regent for the 1 April to 1 October term.

During the course of the XXVIII Legislature, Mularoni was later appointed as Secretary for Territory, Environment, Agriculture Telecommunications, International Economic Cooperation, Civil Protection and Relations with the A.A.S.L.P., following the resignation of Matteo Fiorini. She served on that post until her own resignation was accepted by the Grand and General Council in August 2016.

On 13 March 2018, she was nominated by Future Republic, the political party formed after the merger of the Popular Alliance and the Union for the Republic, to replace the resigning Nicola Cavalli on the Governing Council of the Central Bank of San Marino. Several politicians criticized the nomination, citing concerns over potential conflicts of interest, as Mularoni also held positions on the Board of Directors of the San Marino Economic Development Agency - Chamber of Commerce. Councillor Gian Matteo Zeppa of the RETE Movement called for the appointment to be suspended, highlighting the perceived conflict of interests, or for Mularoni to resign from her role on the joint-stock company, which he argued was a position representing the government. However, her nomination was confirmed by the Grand and General Council, with Mularoni serving on the board until her resignation in July 2023.

== Honors ==
- Order of Merit of the Italian Republic (Italy, 2014)
