= Giancarlo Ghironzi =

Sammarinese politician (1932–2020)

Captain Regent of San Marino
- In office 1 October 1969 – 1 April 1970 Serving with Alvaro Casali
- Preceded by: Ferruccio Piva; Stelio Montironi
- Succeeded by: Francesco Valli; Eusebio Reffi
- In office 1 April 1961 – 1 October 1961 Serving with Federico Micheloni
- Preceded by: Eugenio Reffi; Pietro Giancecchi
- Succeeded by: Giovanni Vito Marcucci; Pio Galassi

Secretary for Foreign and Political Affairs
- In office 11 March 1976 – 18 July 1978
- Preceded by: Gian Luigi Berti
- Succeeded by: Giordano Bruno Reffi
- In office 17 January 1972 – 27 March 1973
- Preceded by: Federico Bigi
- Succeeded by: Gian Luigi Berti

Secretary for Finance and Budget
- In office 6 November 1969 – 17 January 1972
- Preceded by: Pietro Giancecchi
- Succeeded by: Luigi Lonfernini

Additional positions
- 1969–1971: Secretary-General of the Democratic Confederation of San Marino Workers
- 1969–1988: Member of the Grand and General Council
- 1959–1964: Member of the Grand and General Council

Personal details
- Born: 25 January 1932 City of San Marino, San Marino
- Died: 14 March 2020 (aged 88) City of San Marino, San Marino
- Party: Sammarinese Christian Democratic Party
- Education: University of Bologna

Giancarlo Ghironzi (25 February 1932 – 14 March 2020) was a Sammarinese physician and statesman who served as Captain Regent from 1 April to 1 October 1961, and from 1 October 1969 to 1 April 1970. A member of the Sammarinese Christian Democratic Party, he previously served as Secretary for Foreign and Political Affairs from 1972 to 1973 and from 1976 to 1978.

From 1959 to 1964 and from 1969 to 1988, he was a member of the Grand and General Council, the parliament of San Marino. He served as the Secretary for Finance from 1969 to 1972.

He died on 14 March 2020 after a long illness.
