= Congress of State =

Executive body of the Republic of San Marino

- Italian: Congresso di Stato; Romagnol: Cungres ad Stat

Overview
- Established: 15 May 1945; 81 years ago
- State: San Marino
- Leader: Captains Regent (de jure); Secretary of State for Foreign and Political Affairs (de facto)
- Appointed by: Captains Regent
- Ministries: 10
- Responsible to: Grand and General Council
- Headquarters: Palazzo Pubblico, Piazza della Libertà, San Marino
- Website: Official website

The Congress of State (Italian: Congresso di Stato; Romagnol: Cungres ad Stat) is the executive government of the Republic of San Marino. In accordance with Article 3 of the Declaration of Citizens’ Rights, it is politically accountable to the Grand and General Council. The Congress of State determines the general policy of the government and directs administrative action for the implementation of that policy.

The Congress is composed of a variable number of members, generally around ten, appointed by the Grand and General Council from among its own members, who are elected by universal suffrage. Members normally serve for the duration of the legislature, typically five years, but may be required to resign following a parliamentary vote of no confidence.

The Congress of State is chaired by the two Captains Regent, who preside without voting rights. Their role is to coordinate and guide proceedings and to maintain the institutional link between the executive and legislative branches. The Captains Regent rotate every six months in accordance with San Marino’s constitutional tradition.

The most senior position within the Congress is generally considered to be the Secretary of State for Foreign and Political Affairs, often regarded as the de facto head of government, alongside the Secretaries of State for Internal Affairs and for Finance and Budget, who are appointed directly by the Grand and General Council. The remaining Secretaries of State are assigned their portfolios by the Congress following their appointment by the Council.

== Competence ==
The Congress of State is responsible for defining and implementing the general policy of the government in both domestic and international affairs. It determines San Marino’s international policies, including treaties and agreements, particularly those affecting the country’s security.

In domestic administration, the Congress establishes general objectives and programs for the Public Administration and issues directives to ensure their implementation, without prejudice to the legal autonomy of individual administrations. It resolves conflicts among Ministers regarding their attributions and has the power of legislative initiative, drafting laws to be submitted to the Grand and General Council for approval.

The Congress also adopts delegated decrees as provided in Article 3‑bis, fifth paragraph of the Declaration on the Citizens’ Rights. In cases of urgency, it may issue decrees with the force of law, subject to ratification by the Grand and General Council within three months. The Congress prepares and submits the annual and multiannual budget law, together with the relevant financial statements of the State and State corporations, accompanied by the necessary reports. It supervises expenditure plans and individual interventions to ensure compliance with the approved budget and issued directives, and may order the immediate execution of urgent measures under its own responsibility, subject to preventive control according to the provisions in force.

Furthermore, the Congress may suspend ministerial provisions that concern political or administrative matters requiring a collegial decision, and it proposes administrative measures that fall within the competence of the Council. It also adopts regulations regarding the implementation of laws, as well as the organization and functioning of public offices, in accordance with existing legal provisions.

== Current composition (2024–present) ==
The 31st Legislature opened following the 2024 general election, which concluded in the first round of voting and was followed by a post-election agreement between the Sammarinese Christian Democratic Party, Libera San Marino–Socialist Party, Party of Socialists and Democrats, and the Reformist Alliance. The Congress of State is composed of ten Secretaries of State, as follows:

Office	Name	Party	Took office
Secretary of State for Foreign Affairs, Political Affairs, International Economic Cooperation and Digital Transition	Luca Beccari	PDCS	7 January 2020
Secretary of State for Internal Affairs, Civil Service, Institutional Affairs, Relations with the Castle Councils and Regulatory Simplification	Andrea Belluzzi	PSD	24 July 2024
Secretary of State for Finance, Budget, Transport and Energy	Marco Gatti	PDCS	7 January 2020
Secretary of State for Industry, Crafts, Commerce, Technological Research, Telecommunications and Sport	Rossano Fabbri	AR	24 July 2024
Secretary of State for Territory, Environment, Agriculture, Civil Protection and Relations with the A.A.S.L.P.	Matteo Ciacci	Libera	24 July 2024
Secretary of State for Tourism, Postal Affairs, Cooperation, Expò and Information	Federico Pedini Amati	PSD	7 January 2020
Secretary of State for Health, Social Security, Social Affairs and Equal Opportunities	Massimo Andrea Ugolini	PDCS	20 July 2026
Secretary of State for Education, Culture, University, Scientific Research and Youth Policies	Teodoro Lonfernini	PDCS	24 July 2024
Secretary of State for Labour, Economic Planning, Relations with the A.A.S.S., Ecological Transition and Technological Innovation	Alessandro Bevitori	Libera	24 July 2024
Secretary of State for Justice, Welfare and Family	Stefano Canti	PDCS	7 January 2020

== Link ==
- Grand and General Council website (it.)
