= CDLS =

CDLS may refer to:

- Cornelia de Lange Syndrome
- Democratic Confederation of San Marino Workers (Confederazione Democratica dei Lavoratori Sammarinesi)
