= Patrizia Busignani =

Sammarinese politician

Captain Regent of San Marino
- In office 1 April 1993 – 1 October 1993; Served with Salvatore Tonelli
- Preceded by: Romeo Morri; Marino Zanotti
- Succeeded by: Gian Luigi Berti; Paride Andreoli

Personal details
- Born: 11 May 1959 (age 67) Gosselies, Belgium
- Party: Unitary Socialist Party (Before 2001); Party of Democrats (2001–2005); Party of Socialists and Democrats (2005–present)

Patrizia Busignani (born 11 May 1959) was Captain Regent of San Marino from 1 April 1993 to 1 October 1993. Her co-Regent was Salvatore Tonelli.

Busignani was President of Partito Socialista Unitario from 1983 to 1990. She then became Chief of the Parliamentary Group of Socialists for Reforms, President of the Partito dei Democratici and later of the Partito dei Socialisti e dei Democratici, serving in the latter post from 2007 until 2009. In 2008 she was responsible for the PanEuropean Campaign to Combat Violence Against Women. In 2010 and 2011 she was a spokeswoman for the committee to promote a referendum on San Marino joining the European Union.
