= Romeo Morri =

Sammarinese writer and politician (1952–2022)

Captain Regent of San Marino
- In office 1 October 1992 – 1 April 1993 Serving with Marino Zanotti
- Preceded by: Germano De Biagi; Ernesto Benedettini
- Succeeded by: Patrizia Busignani; Salvatore Tonelli

Secretary for Foreign and Political Affairs
- In office 21 May 2002 – 25 June 2002
- Preceded by: Gabriele Gatti
- Succeeded by: Augusto Casali

Additional positions
- 2008–2012: Secretary for Education, Culture, Universities and Youth Policies
- 2000–2001: Secretary for Health and Social Security
- 1998–2000: Secretary for Labour and Cooperation
- 1983–2012: Member of the Grand and General Council

Personal details
- Born: 10 March 1952 Serravalle, San Marino
- Died: 8 June 2022 (aged 70) San Marino
- Party: Sammarinese Populars (from 2003)
- Other political affiliations: Sammarinese Christian Democratic Party (until 2003)
- Education: University of Bologna
- Occupation: Politician, Writer

Romeo Morri (10 March 1952 – 8 June 2022) was a Sammarinese politician who served as Captain Regent from October 1992 to April 1993, alongside Marino Zanotti.

== Biography ==
Morri graduated in pharmacy at the University of Bologna. A member of the Sammarinese Christian Democratic Party, he served in the Grand and General Council from 1983 to 2012. He was also a Captain Regent of San Marino from 1992 to 1993.

Morri died on 8 June 2022 at the age of 70.
