= Fiorenzo Stolfi =

Sammarinese politician (born 1956)

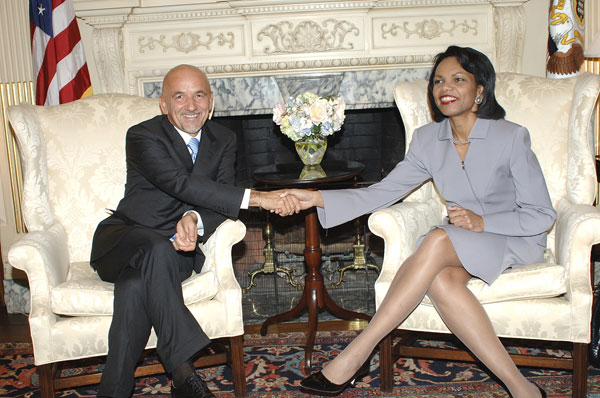
- Stolfi with Condoleezza Rice in Washington DC.

Secretary for Foreign and Political Affairs
- In office 27 July 2006 – 3 December 2008
- Preceded by: Fabio Berardi
- Succeeded by: Antonella Mularoni
- In office 17 December 2002 – 15 December 2003
- Preceded by: Augusto Casali
- Succeeded by: Fabio Berardi

Secretary for Finance and Budget
- In office 20 May 2002 – 16 December 2002
- Preceded by: Pier Marino Menicucci (acting)
- Succeeded by: Pier Marino Menicucci

Additional positions
- 2001-2002: Secretary for Internal Affairs
- 1992-2000: Secretary for Industry, Crafts and Economic Cooperation
- 1990-1992: Co-Secretary of the Sammarinese Socialist Party
- 1983-1986: Secretary for Trade, Tourism, Sport and Agriculture
- 1983-2012: Member of the Grand and General Council

Personal details
- Born: 11 March 1956 (age 70) San Marino
- Party: Party of Socialists and Democrats (since 2005)
- Other political affiliations: Sammarinese Socialist Party (before 2005)
- Children: 2
- Education: University of Urbino (LL.B)

Fiorenzo Stolfi (born 11 March 1956) is a Sammarinese lawyer and politician who served as Secretary of State for Foreign and Political Affairs from 2002 to 2003 and again from 2006 to 2008. A member of the Party of Socialists and Democrats, he was previously the Secretary for Finance from May to December 2002.

Fiorenzo Stolfi, on 28 November 2011, denies all accusations of being the political reference, of the San Marino Connection, falling in Staffa Operation.

On 18 September 2012, Fiorenzo Stolfi was mentioned several times in the "Final Report of the Council Commission for the phenomenon of infiltration of organized crime with powers of investigation" prepared by the Sammarinese Anti-Mafia Commission.
