= San Marino Secretary of State for Foreign and Political Affairs =

Foreign minister of San Marino

Secretary of State for Foreign Affairs, Political Affairs, International Economic Cooperation and Digital Transition of the Republic of San Marino
- Segretario di Stato per gli Affari Esteri, gli Affari Politici, la Cooperazione Economica Internazionale e la Transizione Digitale della Repubblica di San Marino
- Coat of arms of San Marino

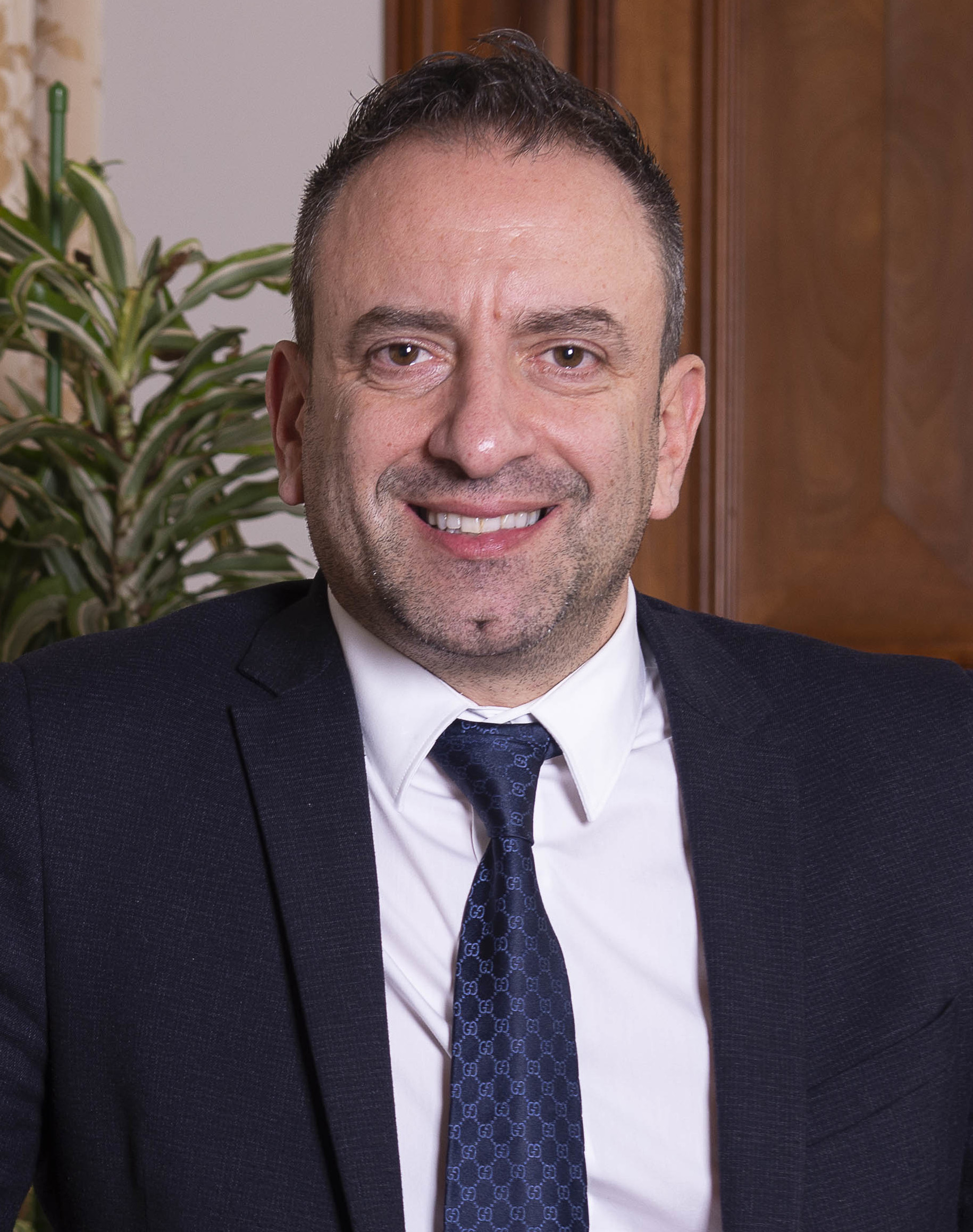
- Incumbent; Luca Beccari since 8 January 2020
- Style: His Excellency (diplomatic)
- Type: Minister of foreign affairs
- Member of: Congress of State
- Reports to: Grand and General Council
- Seat: Palazzo Pubblico
- Appointer: Grand and General Council
- Term length: Not fixed, based on the officeholder's ability to command parliamentary confidence
- Website: Official website

The Secretary of State for Foreign Affairs, Political Affairs, International Economic Cooperation and Digital Transition (Italian: Segretario di Stato per gli Affari Esteri, gli Affari Politici, la Cooperazione Economica Internazionale e la Transizione Digitale) (Note: Currently styled in English as Minister of Foreign Affairs, Political Affairs, International Economic Cooperation and Digital Transition.) is the minister responsible for foreign affairs in the Republic of San Marino. Owing to the absence of a prime ministerial office within San Marino's constitutional structure and the prominence of the position, the Secretary for Foreign Affairs is often regarded as the country's de facto head of government and its most senior minister. Although this status is not constitutionally defined, the officeholder is typically a member of the largest party or governing coalition in the Grand and General Council following a general election.

Together with the Secretary of State for Internal Affairs and the Secretary of State for Finance and Budget, the Secretary for Foreign Affairs, Political Affairs, International Economic Cooperation and Digital Transition is one of three members of the Congress of State appointed directly by the Grand and General Council, the unicameral parliament of San Marino.

From 27 December 2016 to 7 January 2020, the office was held by Nicola Renzi of the Adesso.sm coalition. Since 7 January 2020, the Secretary of State for Foreign Affairs, Political Affairs, International Economic Cooperation and Digital Transition has been Luca Beccari of the Sammarinese Christian Democratic Party.

== List of secretaries of state for foreign and political affairs ==
The following have served as secretary of state for foreign and political affairs of San Marino:

- Bartolomeo Borghesi, 1830-1860
- Domenico Fattori, 1860–1908
- Menetto Bonelli, 1908–1918
- Giuliano Gozi, 1918–1943
- Gustavo Babboni, 1943–1945
- Gino Giacomini, 1945–1957
- Federico Bigi, 1957–1972
- Giancarlo Ghironzi, 1972–1973 and 1976–1978
- Gian Luigi Berti, 1973–1976
- Giordano Bruno Reffi, 1978–1986
- Gabriele Gatti, 1986–2002
- Romeo Morri, May–June 2002
- Augusto Casali, June–December 2002
- Fiorenzo Stolfi, 2002–2003 and 2006–2008
- Fabio Berardi, 2003–2006
- Antonella Mularoni, 2008–2012
- Pasquale Valentini, 2012–2016
- Nicola Renzi, 2016–2020
- Luca Beccari, 2020–present

== See also ==
- Congress of State
- Grand and General Council
- San Marino Secretary for Finance and Budget
