= 2004 San Marino local elections =

The 2004 San Marino local elections were held on 18 April to elect the mayor and the council of the municipalities of Borgo Maggiore, in San Marino, as the 2003 Sammarinese local elections was declared invalid, as the turnout quorum was not reached. Turnout in this election was 61.5%.

== Electoral system ==
Voters elected the mayor (Italian: capitano di castello) and the municipal council (giunta di castello) of Borgo Maggiore. The number of seats of the council was established at 10 by law. Candidates ran on lists led by a mayoral candidate. Voters elected a list and were allowed to give up to two preferential votes. Seats were allocated with the d'Hondt method if the winner had obtained at least 60% of the votes. Otherwise, six seats would have been allocated to the winning party and the rest of the seats would have been allocated using the d'Hondt method to the rest of the parties. The mayoral candidate of the winning list was proclaimed mayor.

== Results ==
=== Borgo Maggiore ===
List	Mayoral candidate	Votes	%	Seats
List C	Settimio Lonfernini	1,274	50.42	6
List B	Pietro Faetanini	694	27.46	2
List A	Monica Stacchini	559	22.12	2
Total		2,527	100.00	10
Valid votes		2,527	93.18	
Invalid/blank votes		185	6.82	
Total votes		2,712	100.00	
Registered voters/turnout		4,410	61.50	
