= 2003 San Marino local elections =

The 2003 San Marino local elections were held on 30 November to elect the mayors and the councils of the nine municipalities of San Marino. Overall turnout was 55.4%. The election in Borgo Maggiore was declared invalid, as the turnout quorum was not reached. Therefore, a second election was held on 18 April 2004.

== Electoral system ==
Voters elected the mayor (Italian: capitano di castello) and the municipal council (giunta di castello). The number of seats was determined by law: the city councils of Chiesanuova, Faetano and Montegiardino were composed of eight members; the councils of Acquaviva, Borgo Maggiore, City of San Marino, Domagnano, Fiorentino and Serravalle were composed of 10 members.

Candidates ran on lists led by a mayoral candidate. Voters elected a list and were allowed to give up to two preferential votes. Seats were allocated with the d'Hondt method if the winner had obtained at least 60% of the votes. Otherwise, six seats would have been allocated to the winning party (five seats if the council had eight members) and the rest of the seats would have been allocated using the d'Hondt method to the rest of the parties. The winning list mayoral candidate was proclaimed mayor.

In the municipalities where only one list contested the election, the election was considered valid if the turnout was over 50% and the votes to the list were over 50% of the valid votes (votes to the list plus blank votes).

== Results ==
=== Acquaviva ===
List	Mayoral candidate	Votes	%	Seats
List A	Silvano Semprini	596	100.00	8
Total		596	100.00	8
Valid votes		596	91.41	
Invalid/blank votes		56	8.59	
Total votes		652	100.00	
Registered voters/turnout		1,119	58.27	

=== Borgo Maggiore ===
The election was declared invalid as the turnout quorum was not reached. The elections were repeated on 18 April 2004.

List	Mayoral candidate	Votes	%	Seats
List A	Valeriano Zavoli	1,828	100.00	10
Total		1,828	100.00	10
Valid votes		1,828	84.01	
Invalid/blank votes		348	15.99	
Total votes		2,176	100.00	
Registered voters/turnout		4,382	49.66	

=== Chiesanuova ===
List	Mayoral candidate	Votes	%	Seats
List A	Anna Maria Muccioli	345	100.00	8
Total		345	100.00	8
Valid votes		345	86.25	
Invalid/blank votes		55	13.75	
Total votes		400	100.00	
Registered voters/turnout		687	58.22	

=== City of San Marino ===
List	Mayoral candidate	Votes	%	Seats
List A	Alessandro Barulli	894	55.15	6
List B	Paola Mai	727	44.85	4
Total		1,621	100.00	10
Valid votes		1,621	91.17	
Invalid/blank votes		157	8.83	
Total votes		1,778	100.00	
Registered voters/turnout		3,424	51.93	

=== Domagnano ===
List	Mayoral candidate	Votes	%	Seats
List A	Pier Marino Felici	717	62.35	6
List B	Gianni Selva	433	37.65	4
Total		1,150	100.00	10
Valid votes		1,150	92.22	
Invalid/blank votes		97	7.78	
Total votes		1,247	100.00	
Registered voters/turnout		1,940	64.28	

=== Faetano ===
List	Mayoral candidate	Votes	%	Seats
List A	Pier Marino Bedetti	420	100.00	8
Total		420	100.00	8
Valid votes		420	92.51	
Invalid/blank votes		34	7.49	
Total votes		454	100.00	
Registered voters/turnout		744	61.02	

=== Fiorentino ===
List	Mayoral candidate	Votes	%	Seats
List B	Alfredo Amici	608	65.59	7
List A	Georges Santi	319	34.41	3
Total		927	100.00	10
Valid votes		927	94.02	
Invalid/blank votes		59	5.98	
Total votes		986	100.00	
Registered voters/turnout		1,502	65.65	

=== Montegiardino ===
List	Mayoral candidate	Votes	%	Seats
List B	Italo Righi	298	68.51	5
List A	Edoardo Bollini	137	31.49	3
Total		435	100.00	8
Valid votes		435	94.98	
Invalid/blank votes		23	5.02	
Total votes		458	100.00	
Registered voters/turnout		570	80.35	

=== Serravalle ===
List	Mayoral candidate	Votes	%	Seats
List A	Gian Carlo Capicchioni	1,821	60.72	6
List B	Riccardo Faetanini	1,178	39.28	4
Total		2,999	100.00	10
Valid votes		2,999	87.03	
Invalid/blank votes		447	12.97	
Total votes		3,446	100.00	
Registered voters/turnout		6,573	52.43	
