= Gian Luigi Berti =

Sammarinese politician (1930–2014)

Captain Regent of San Marino
- In office 1 October 1993 – 1 April 1994 Serving with Paride Andreoli
- Preceded by: Patrizia Busignani; Salvatore Tonelli
- Succeeded by: Alberto Cecchetti; Fausto Mularoni

Secretary for Foreign and Political Affairs
- In office 27 March 1973 – 11 March 1976
- Preceded by: Giancarlo Ghironzi
- Succeeded by: Giancarlo Ghironzi

Additional positions
- 1974: President of the Central Council of the Sammarinese Christian Democratic Party
- 1961–1968: Secretary for Internal Affairs
- 1960–1961: Secretary for Interior and Finance
- 1955–1998: Member of the Grand and General Council

Personal details
- Born: 16 May 1930 City of San Marino, San Marino
- Died: 26 February 2014 (aged 83) San Marino
- Party: Sammarinese Christian Democratic Party
- Children: Gian Nicola and Maria Luisa

Gian Luigi Berti (16 May 1930 – 26 February 2014) was a Sammarinese lawyer and statesman who served as Captain Regent from 1 October 1993 to 1 April 1994. A member of the Sammarinese Christian Democratic Party, he previously served as Secretary for Foreign and Political Affairs from 1973 to 1976.

== Career ==
In 1975, he signed the Helsinki Accords for San Marino.

A lawyer, he was active in San Marinese politics for over 40 years. He was a member of the Sammarinese Christian Democratic Party.
