= Kristina Pardalos =

San Marino judge

President of the Guarantors' Panel on the Constitutionality of Rules
- Incumbent
- Assumed office 14 July 2022

Judge of the European Court of Human Rights
- In office 21 September 2009 – 25 September 2018
- Preceded by: Antonella Mularoni

Personal details
- Born: 1973 (age 52–53) New York City, U.S.
- Education: University of Bologna

Kristina Pardalos (born 1973) is a Sammarinese judge, who was elected as the San Marino judge at the European Court of Human Rights (ECHR) on 21 September 2009, where she replaced the retiring Antonella Mularoni. In 2017 she was appointed Vice President of the First Section of the ECHR. Her roles at the ECHR concluded on 25 September 2018. On 17 January 2020 she was appointed to the Guarantors' Panel on the Constitutionality of Rules, which is the highest constitutional law court in San Marino. On 20 July 2022 she was elected President of the Guarantors' Panel.

Pardalos was born in New York. She graduated in law from the University of Bologna in 1999. After a three-year internship at a law firm, she was admitted to the bar in San Marino in 2002. From 2004 to 2009, Pardalos served as an alternate member of the European Commission against Racism and Intolerance.
