= Enrico Carattoni =

Sammarinese politician

Captain Regent of San Marino
- In office 1 October 2017 – 1 April 2018 Serving with Matteo Fiorini
- Preceded by: Vanessa D'Ambrosio; Mimma Zavoli
- Succeeded by: Stefano Palmieri; Matteo Ciacci

Personal details
- Born: 18 May 1985 (age 41) Borgo Maggiore, San Marino
- Party: Democratic Socialist Left

Enrico Carattoni (born 18 May 1985) is a Sammarinese politician and one of the Captains Regent, served with Matteo Fiorini. He took office on 1 October 2017.
