= Vanessa D'Ambrosio =

Sammarinese politician

Captain Regent of San Marino
- In office 1 April 2017 – 1 October 2017; Served with Mimma Zavoli
- Preceded by: Marino Riccardi; Fabio Berardi
- Succeeded by: Enrico Carattoni; Matteo Fiorini

Personal details
- Born: 26 April 1988 (age 38) Borgo Maggiore, San Marino
- Party: Democratic Area (2021–present)
- Other political affiliations: United Left (2012–2017); Democratic Socialist Left (2017–2021)
- Education: University of Bologna

Vanessa D'Ambrosio (born 26 April 1988) is a former Captain Regent of San Marino, serving from April until October 2017 (alongside Mimma Zavoli).

== Early life and education ==
She was born in Borgo Maggiore, San Marino on 26 April 1988. She graduated with a thesis on the economy of labor and the gender issue in Saudi Arabia after the Gulf crisis from the University of Bologna. She is the granddaughter of Francesco Berti, one of the founders of the Sammarinese Communist Party.

== Career ==
She was elected to the Grand and General Council back in 2014. She was appointed to become a coordinator for the United Left. D'Ambrosio is the second youngest woman who became Captain Regent in the history of San Marino after Maria Lea Pedini-Angelini, who was sworn in at the age of 25. Since December 2016, D'Ambrosio has been the Head of Delegation for San Marino to the Council of Europe. She participated in the Strasbourg Plenary Session in January 2017, where she signed a motion for the protection of migrant children through education.
