= Mimma Zavoli =

Sammarinese politician

Captain Regent of San Marino
- In office 1 April 2017 – 1 October 2017; Served with Vanessa D'Ambrosio
- Preceded by: Marino Riccardi; Fabio Berardi
- Succeeded by: Enrico Carattoni; Matteo Fiorini

Personal details
- Born: 13 February 1963 (age 63) Santarcangelo di Romagna, Italy
- Party: Independent (1989–2012, 2020–present); Civic 10 (2012–2020); PDCS (1977–1989)
- Children: 2

Mimma Zavoli (born 13 February 1963) is a Sammarinese politician who was elected as Captain Regent of San Marino and served alongside Vanessa D'Ambrosio from 1 April until 1 October 2017.

She was elected to the Grand and General Council in 2012. She was appointed the Chairman of the Internal Affairs Commission and a member of the Commission of Justice Affairs. She was also appointed to the Council of Twelve and the National Group of Inter-Parliamentary Union. She has a School of Science diploma and an Infantile Community Assistant diploma. In 1998, she obtained a mini-graduation in teaching qualifications. She started her career in 1981, working in the kindergarten. Now, she works as Inspector of Labour. She was also an activist from 1977 to 1989 for the Sammarinese Christian Democratic Party.
