= Luigi Lonfernini =

Sammarinese politician

Luigi Lonfernini (born 31 August 1938) was Captain Regent of San Marino in 1971 and 2001. He is also a lawyer and banker. He served as a member of the Sammarinese Christian Democratic Party. He received a law degree from the University of Bologna. He was elected as the Secretary for Finance from 1972 to 1973.
