= Anna Maria Muccioli =

Sammarinese politician

Captain Regent of San Marino
- In office 1 October 2013 – 1 April 2014; Served with Gian Carlo Capicchioni
- Preceded by: Antonella Mularoni; Denis Amici
- Succeeded by: Luca Beccari; Valeria Ciavatta

Personal details
- Born: 15 August 1964 (age 62) San Leo, Italy
- Party: Christian Democratic Party
- Education: University of Urbino

Anna Maria Muccioli (born 15 August 1964) is a Sammarinese politician who served as a Captain Regent for a six-month term in 2013 and 2014, with Gian Carlo Capicchioni.

She was born in San Leo and studied law before entering public administration as a state lawyer. She was previously the capitano (mayor) of Castello di Chiesanuova from 2003 to 2008, as she was elected in the 2003 Sammarinese local elections. After which she joined the directorate of the Sammarinese Christian Democratic Party. On the 27th April 2011 she became a member of the Grand and General Council and the Council Committee on Finance and Budget. She is married with two children.
