= Gian Carlo Capicchioni =

Sammarinese politician

Secretary for Finance
- In office 22 October 2014 – 27 December 2016
- Preceded by: Claudio Felici
- Succeeded by: Simone Celli

Captain Regent of San Marino
- In office 1 October 2013 – 1 April 2014 Serving with Anna Maria Muccioli
- Preceded by: Antonella Mularoni; Denis Amici
- Succeeded by: Luca Beccari; Valeria Ciavatta

Personal details
- Born: 19 February 1956 (age 70) Borgo Maggiore, San Marino
- Party: Party of Socialists and Democrats

Gian Carlo Capicchioni (born 19 February 1956) is a Sammarinese politician who served as a Captain Regent for a 6-month term in 2013 and 2014, alongside Anna Maria Muccioli. He was previously the capitano (mayor) of Serravalle and a member of the Grand and General Council.

Political offices
Preceded by Claudio Felici	Secretary for Finance; 2014–2016	Succeeded by Simone Celli
