= Democratic Confederation of San Marino Workers =

National trade union center in San Marino

CDLS
- Democratic Confederation of San Marino Workers
- Confederazione Democratica dei Lavoratori Sammarinesi
- Founded: November 12, 1957
- Headquarters: Domagnano, San Marino
- Location: San Marino
- Key people: Marco Beccari, secretary general
- Affiliations: ITUC
- Website: www.cdls.sm

The Democratic Confederation of San Marino Workers (Italian: Confederazione Democratica dei Lavoratori Sammarinesi, CDLS) is a national trade union center in San Marino. It was formed November 12, 1957 and is affiliated with the International Trade Union Confederation.

== Leadership ==
Secretary general:

- Marino Bugli (1960–1969)
- Giancarlo Ghironzi (1969–1971)
- Antonio Zanotti (1971–1972)
- Giovanni Giardi (1972–1984)
- Antonio Macina (1984–1987)
- Rita Ghironzi (1987–1991)
- Marco Beccari (1991-current)

== Federations ==
The CDLS consists of four federations of workers as well as the Pensioners' Federation (Federazione Pensionati).

- Industry Workers' Federation (Federazione dei Lavoratori dell’Industria)
- State Workers' Federation (Federazione Pubblico Impiego)
- Building Workers' Federation (Federazione Lavoratori delle Costruzioni)
- Service Workers' Federation (Federazione Lavoratori dei Servizi)
