= Denis Amici =

Sammarinese politician

Captain Regent of San Marino
- In office 1 April 2013 – 1 October 2013 Serving with Antonella Mularoni
- Preceded by: Teodoro Lonfernini; Denise Bronzetti
- Succeeded by: Gian Carlo Capicchioni; Anna Maria Muccioli

Personal details
- Born: 10 June 1972 (age 54) San Marino, San Marino
- Party: Sammarinese Christian Democratic Party

Denis Amici (born 10 June 1972) is a Sammarinese politician who served as Captain Regent of San Marino alongside Antonella Mularoni from April 2013 until October 2013.

== Biography ==
Amici was born on 10 June 1972 in the City of San Marino, San Marino, a small country in Europe completely surrounded by Italy. Amici has a degree in Accounting and Business, taking over his father's company in 1999. He first entered politics in 2008 and is a member of the Sammarinese Christian Democratic Party. Amici was elected to the parliament in 2012. On 21 March 2013 Amici, together with Antonella Mularoni, was elected joint Captain Regent of San Marino for a six-month term, starting on 1 April and ending on 1 October. Amici lives in Fiorentino, one of the nine municipalities of the country.
