= San Marino Secretary of State for Finance and Budget =

Government official

The Secretary of State for Finance and Budget (Italian: Segretario di Stato per le finanze e il bilancio) is the Minister of Finance of San Marino.

Together with the Secretary for Interior and the Secretary for Foreign Affairs, this officer is one of the three members of the executive Congress of State directly appointed by the Grand and General Council, the parliament of the republic. The position was established in 1969.

== Secretaries ==
- Giancarlo Ghironzi, 1969–1972
- Luigi Lonfernini, 1972–1973
- Remy Giacomini, 1973–1978
- Emilio Della Balda, 1978–1986
- Clara Boscaglia, 1986–1990
- Clelio Galassi, 1990–2002
- Pier Marino Menicucci, 2002
- Fiorenzo Stolfi, 2002
- Pier Marino Mularoni, 2002–2006
- Stefano Macina, 2006–2008
- Gabriele Gatti, 2008–2010
- Pasquale Valentini, 2010–2012
- Claudio Felici, 2012–2014
- Gian Carlo Capicchioni, 2014–2016
- Simone Celli, 2016–2018
- Eva Guidi, 2018–2020
- Marco Gatti, 2020–

== See also ==
- Central Bank of San Marino
- San Marino Secretary for Foreign Affairs
