= Stefano Palmieri =

Sammarinese politician

Captain Regent of San Marino
- In office 1 April 2018 – 1 October 2018 Serving with Matteo Ciacci
- Preceded by: Enrico Carattoni; Matteo Fiorini
- Succeeded by: Mirko Tomassoni; Luca Santolini
- In office 1 October 2009 – 1 April 2010 Serving with Francesco Mussoni
- Preceded by: Massimo Cenci; Oscar Mina
- Succeeded by: Marco Conti; Glauco Sansovini

Personal details
- Born: 18 September 1964 (age 62) Serravalle, San Marino
- Party: Future Republic; Popular Alliance
- Profession: Accountant

Stefano Palmieri (born 18 September 1964) is a Sammarinese politician, who served as a Captain Regent of San Marino together with Matteo Ciacci from 1 April 2018 to 1 October 2018. He had previously served in the same position for the semester from 1 October 2009 to 1 April 2010, alongside Francesco Mussoni.

== Life ==
Member of the Popular Alliance (Alleanza Popolare), Palmieri has been in the Grand and General Council since 2006. He was one of the founders of "Movimento Biancoazzurro", which merged into Alleanza Popolare in 2005.

Palmieri is a certified accountant, married and father of two sons.

== Honours ==
=== Foreign honours ===
- Monaco : Grand Cross of the Order of Saint-Charles (5 March 2010)
