= Luca Beccari =

Sammarinese politician (born 1974)

Luca Beccari OMRI OSI OC
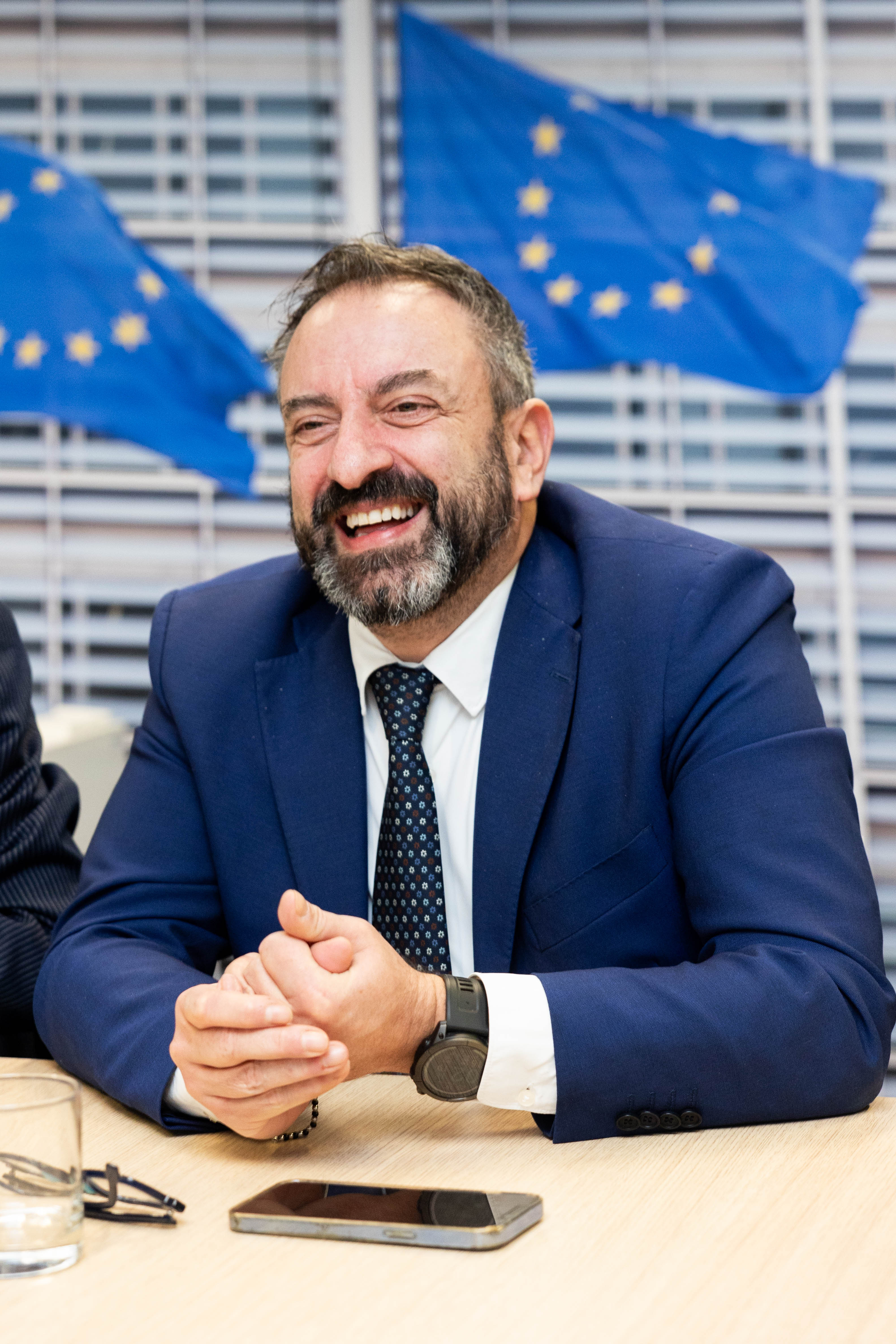
- Beccari in 2024

Secretary for Foreign and Political Affairs
- Incumbent
- Assumed office 8 January 2020
- Preceded by: Nicola Renzi

President of the Sammarinese Christian Democratic Party
- In office 4 April 2017 – 19 November 2020
- Secretary: Gian Carlo Venturini
- Preceded by: Teodoro Lonfernini
- Succeeded by: Pasquale Valentini

Captain Regent of San Marino
- In office 1 April 2014 – 1 October 2014 Serving with Valeria Ciavatta
- Preceded by: Gian Carlo Capicchioni; Anna Maria Muccioli
- Succeeded by: Gianfranco Terenzi; Guerrino Zanotti

Member of the Grand and General Council
- Incumbent
- Assumed office 5 December 2012

Personal details
- Born: 29 October 1974 (age 51) City of San Marino, San Marino
- Party: Sammarinese Christian; Democratic Party (since 1993); Independent (before 1993)
- Children: 1
- Education: University of Urbino

Luca Beccari (born 29 October 1974) is a Sammarinese politician and public administrator who has served as Secretary of State for Foreign and Political Affairs since January 2020. A member of the Sammarinese Christian Democratic Party, he previously served as Captain Regent of San Marino for a six-month term in 2014, alongside Valeria Ciavatta.

Beccari resides in Serravalle and previously worked as an official of the Central Bank of San Marino.

== Early life and career ==
Beccari was born in the City of San Marino in 1974. He attended the Technical and Commercial Institute "Rino Molari" in Santarcangelo di Romagna before obtaining a degree (laurea) in Economics and Commerce from the University of Urbino.

After several years working in the private sector as an administrative employee, he began his professional career in 1997 at the Central Bank of San Marino (then the Istituto di Credito Sammarinese). Over the course of his career, he held a number of senior administrative roles, including official responsible for the Treasury Department, the Tax Collection Service, the Compliance Service, International Relations, Organisation and Human Resources, General Services, and anti-money laundering activities.

In 2006, and again from 2008 to 2012, he served as Coordinator of the Department of Finance and Budget.

== Political career ==
A member of the Sammarinese Christian Democratic Party since 1993, Beccari became active in the party’s internal leadership structures, serving as a member of its directorate and central governing bodies. On 4 April 2017, he was elected President of the Central Council of the PDCS, one of the party’s highest internal offices.

Beccari was first elected to the Grand and General Council in the 2012 general election, beginning his parliamentary career. During the 29th Legislature, he served as Captain Regent from April to October 2014 together with Valeria Ciavatta of the PDCS.

He was re-elected to parliament in the 2019 general election and was subsequently appointed Secretary of State for Foreign and Political Affairs on 8 January 2020 during the 30th Legislature, leading the formation of a coalition government with the PDCS, Tomorrow in Motion and We for the Republic. He was again elected in 2024 as a candidate of the Democracy and Freedom alliance, placing third on the coalition list.
