= Matteo Ciacci =

Sammarinese politician (born 1990)

Captain Regent of San Marino
- In office 1 April 2018 – 1 October 2018 Serving with Stefano Palmieri
- Preceded by: Enrico Carattoni; Matteo Fiorini
- Succeeded by: Mirko Tomassoni; Luca Santolini

Leader of Libera
- Incumbent
- Assumed office 14 November 2020

Personal details
- Born: 5 May 1990 (age 36) Borgo Maggiore, San Marino
- Party: Libera (since 2020); Civic 10 (2012–2020)
- Education: University of Urbino

Matteo Ciacci (born 5 May 1990) is a Sammarinese politician, who served as one of the Captains Regent, along with Stefano Palmieri. He took office on 1 April 2018 and served until 1 October 2018.

He worked as an official and sports manager. Ciacci studied law at the University of Urbino.
