= Matteo Fiorini =

Sammarinese politician (1978–2026)

Captain Regent of San Marino
- In office 1 October 2017 – 1 April 2018 Serving with Enrico Carattoni
- Preceded by: Vanessa D'Ambrosio; Mimma Zavoli
- Succeeded by: Stefano Palmieri; Matteo Ciacci
- In office 1 October 2011 – 1 April 2012 Serving with Gabriele Gatti
- Preceded by: Maria Luisa Berti; Filippo Tamagnini
- Succeeded by: Italo Righi; Maurizio Rattini

Personal details
- Born: 10 February 1978 City of San Marino, San Marino
- Died: 21 August 2026 (aged 48) City of San Marino, San Marino
- Party: Popular Alliance

Matteo Fiorini (10 February 1978 – 21 August 2026) was a Sammarinese politician who was a Captain Regent (head of government for San Marino) for the October 2011 to April 2012 political term. The post was shared with Gabriele Gatti. He also served with Enrico Carattoni as Captain Regent from October 2017 until April 2018. Fiorini died on 21 August 2026, at the age of 48.
