= Greca (insignia) =

A greca

Greca (literally, Greek) is the term for the symbol of general rank or equivalent in the Italian Army, Italian Air Force, the Carabinieri and the Italian Navy. It is also used for those of high rank in the Vatican Gendarmerie and for generals in the military of San Marino. It is named after 'greca', the Italian term for Greek key or meander. It resembles a double reversed letter W with a horizontal line across it.

Shoulder insignia of a capo di Stato Maggiore dell'Esercito, with 'greca' at the bottom

Shoulder insignia of a squadron admiral

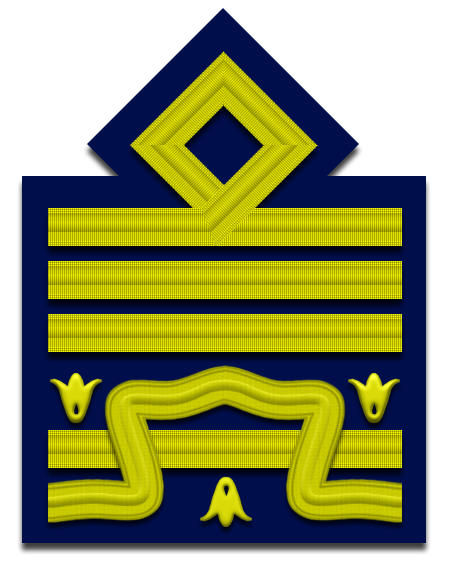
Shoulder insignia of a generale di squadra aerea.

Shoulder insignia of a comandante generale of the Arma dei Carabinieri.

Shoulder insignia of a comandante generale of the Guardia di Finanza

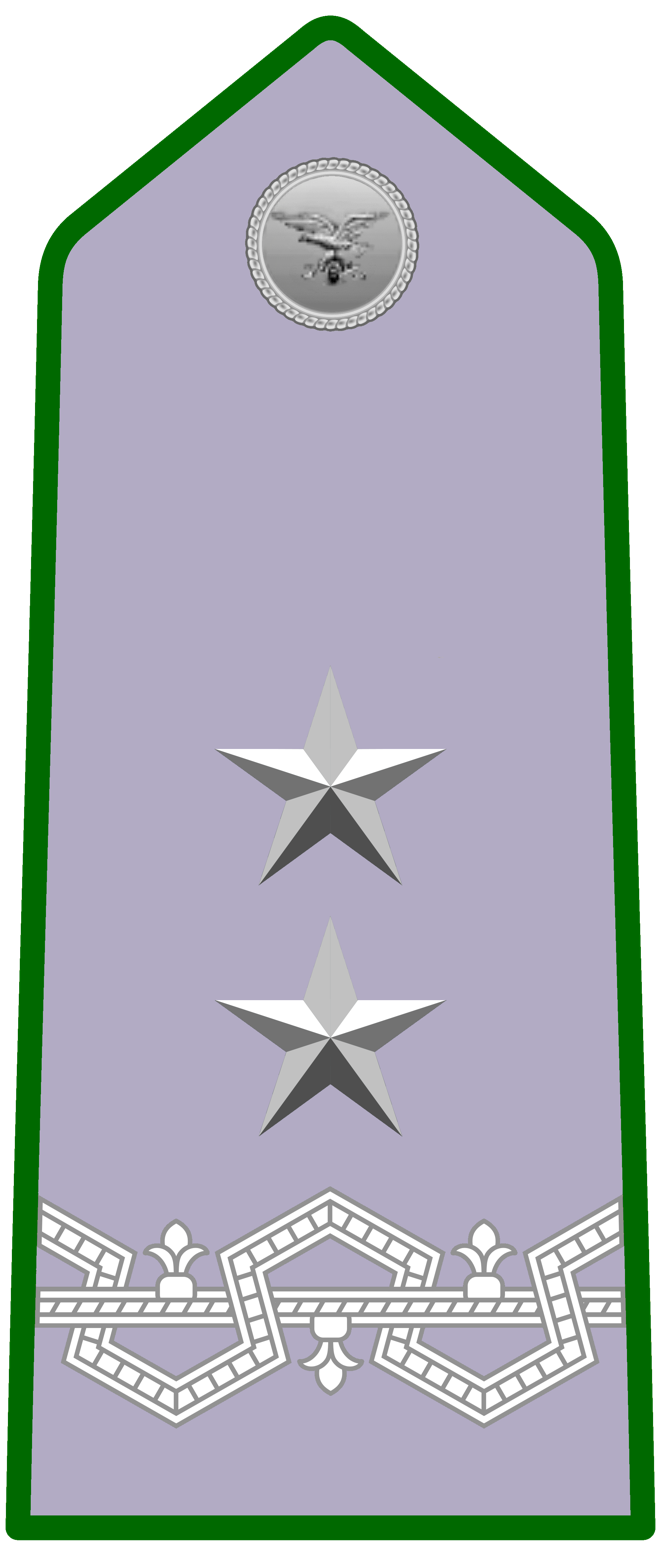
Shoulder insignia of a Dirigente Generale of the Corpo Forestale dello Stato

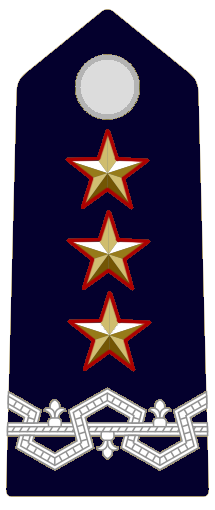
Shoulder insignia of a Ispettore generale of the Vatican Gendarmerie

Shoulder insignia of a Generale of San Marino
