= Law enforcement in San Marino =

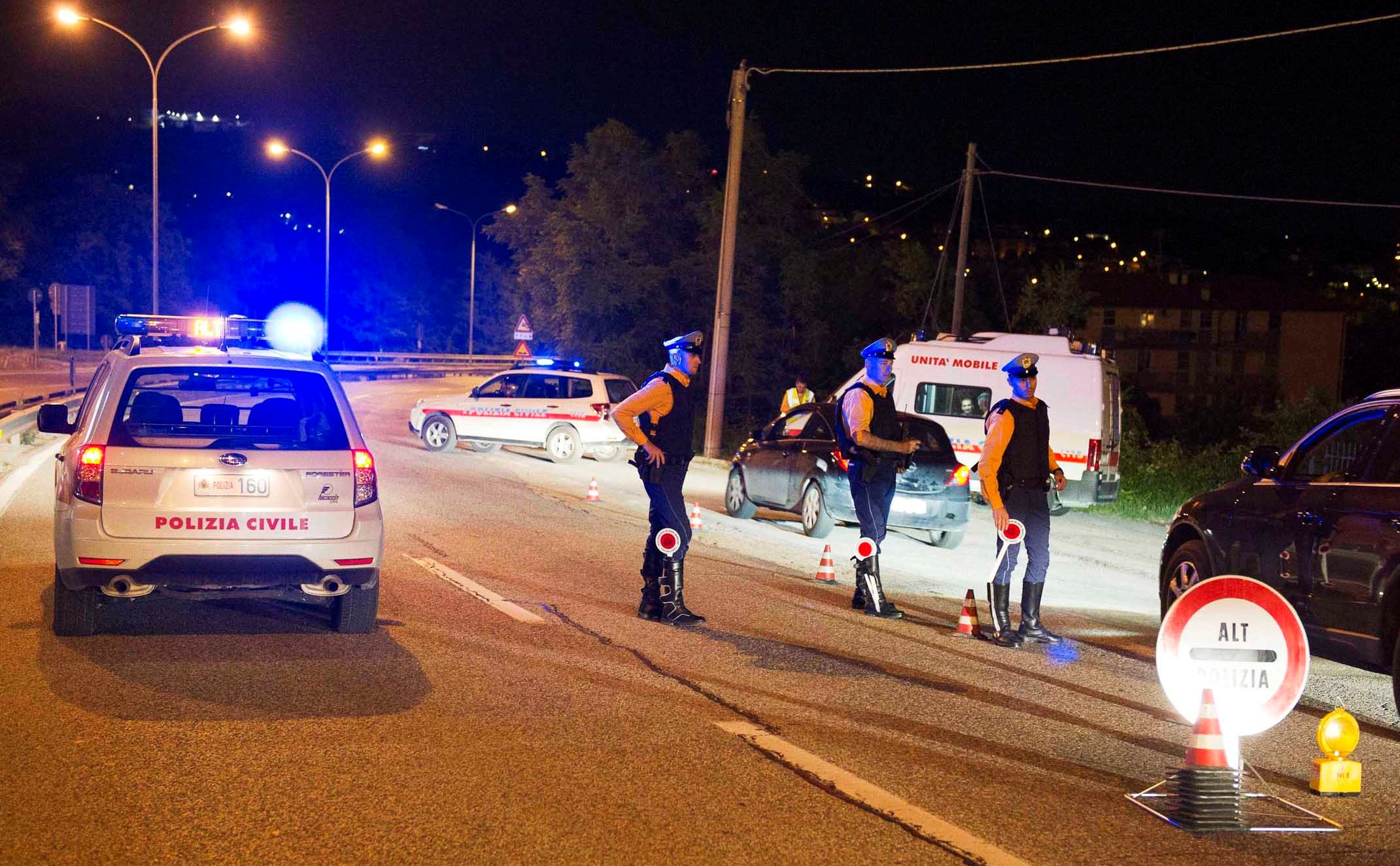
Civil Police border checkpoint

Law enforcement in San Marino is the responsibility of the centralized Civil Police, the Corps of Gendarmerie of San Marino (militarized police), and the Fortress Guard (border patrol, part of the Military of San Marino).

These three organisations have been providing law enforcement in San Marino since a statute in 1987, which redefined their roles. Their responsibilities were further defined by regulations for the Gendarmerie and the Fortress Guard, which was approved by the Government of San Marino in 2008. Under the 2008 regulations the Gendarmerie and the Fortress Guards are responsible for policing, criminal investigation, national penitentiary, changing the guard, border patrol, customs control, personal protection, and national security, while the Civil Police are tasked with tax collection, domestic security, traffic control, and civil defence. All three agencies are subordinate to the Secretary of State of Home Affairs.

At the end of 2012, there were 160 police officers serving in San Marino: 70 Gendarmerie, 50 Civil Police, and 40 Fortress Guard. For that year, annual law enforcement expenditure was $US 13.3 million.

San Marino is part of the international police cooperation organization Interpol; there is an Interpol office in San Marino City.
