= Civil Police =

Civil Police may refer to:

- Civil Police (Brazil)
- Civil Police (San Marino)

== See also ==
- Civilian police
