= Civil Police (San Marino) =

Civil Police of San Marino Corpo di Polizia Civile
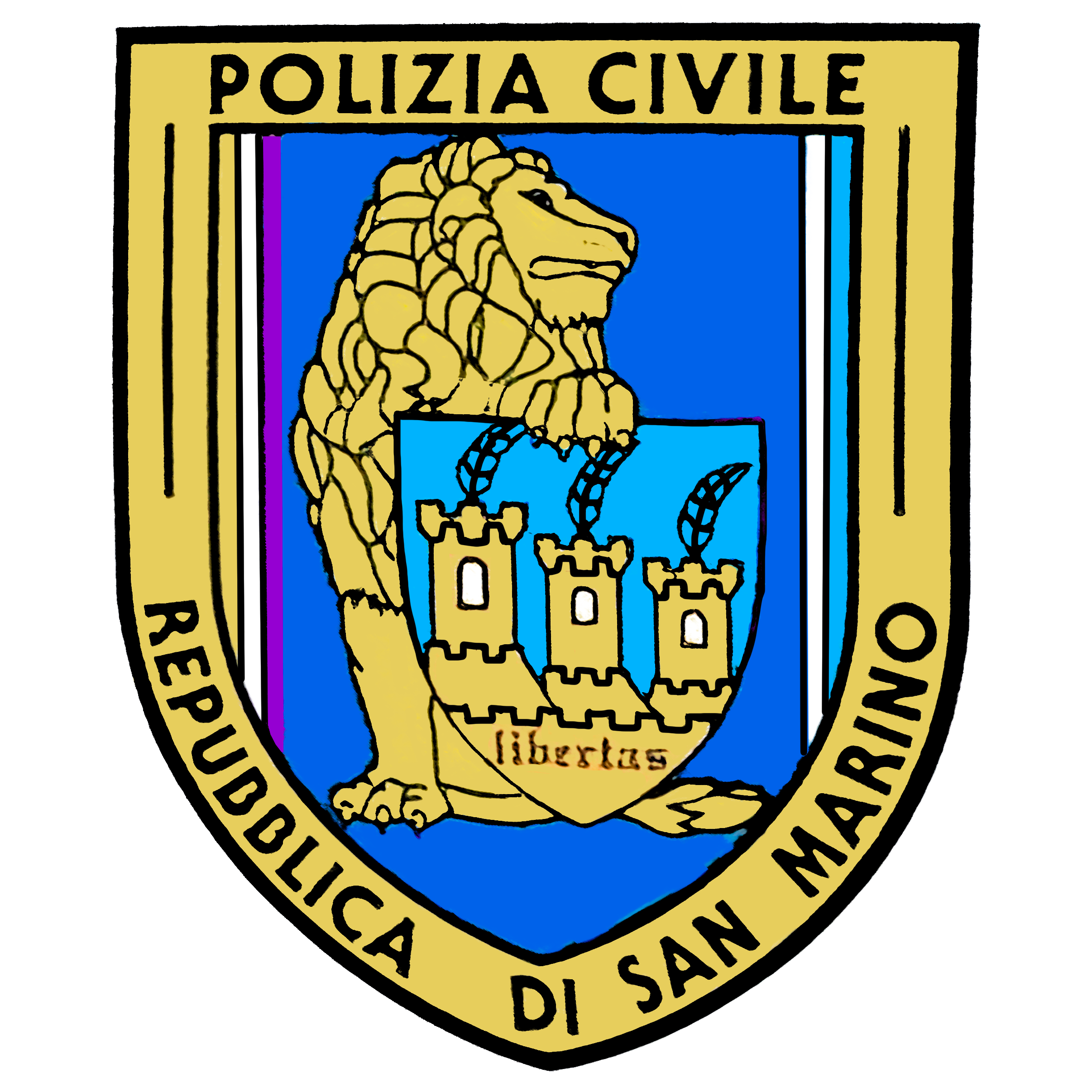
- Coat of Arms of the Civil Police
- Abbreviation: PC
- Motto: Libertas "Liberty"

Agency overview
- Formed: January 1, 1945
- Preceding agencies: Traffic Police Corps; Gendarmerie
- Employees: 50 (2012)
- Annual budget: $4.8 million (2012)

Jurisdictional structure
- National agency: San Marino
- Operations jurisdiction: San Marino
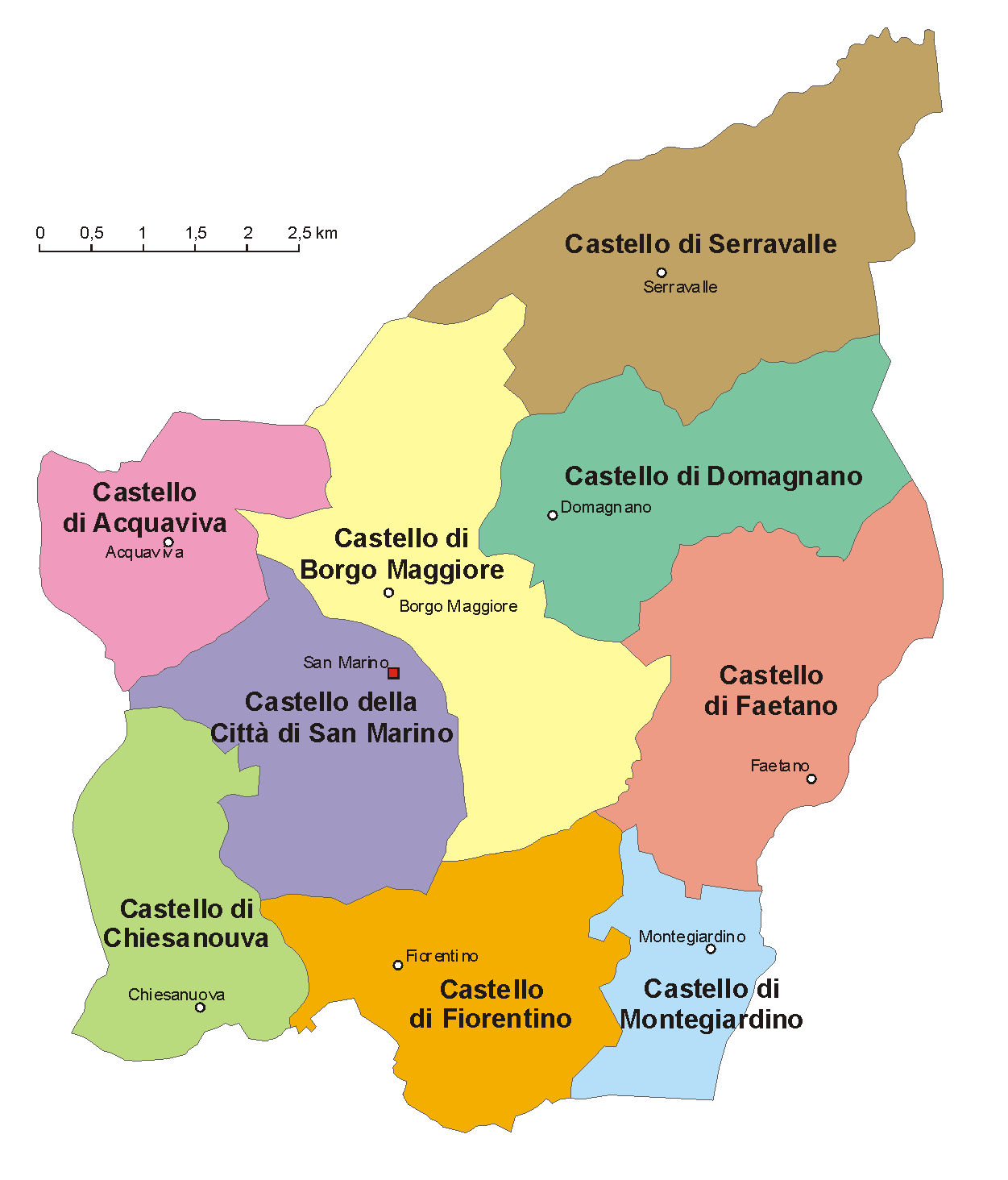
- Map of Civil Police of San Marino's jurisdiction
- Area: 61 km^{2} (24 sq mi)
- Population: 32,000
- Governing body: Government of San Marino
- General nature: Local civilian police

Operational structure
- Headquarters: City of San Marino
- Agency executive: Werter Selva, Commander
- Parent agency: Secretary of State of Home Affairs

Facilities
- Vehicles: 33
- Patrol boats: 1
- Helicopters: 1

Website
- Official website

The Civil Police (Italian: Corpo di Polizia Civile) founded on January 1, 1945, is one of the law enforcement organisations in San Marino, who police one of the smallest, but perhaps one of the safest countries in the world. San Marino's low population and low crime rates combine to make it the least incarcerated country in the world - as recently as 2011, only one prisoner was incarcerated in the entire nation. The Secretary of State of Home Affairs controls the Civil Police, who are responsible for tax collection, domestic security, traffic control, and civil defence. Currently there are around 50 police officers and civilian employees serving in the Civil Police, according to a report by the Government of San Marino. The Civil Police are required by statute to cooperate with two military units, the Gendarmerie and the Fortress Guard, who are responsible (from new regulations passed in 2008) for policing, criminal investigation, national penitentiary, changing the guard, border patrol, customs control, personal protection, and national security.

== Emergencies ==
The national emergency telephone number, for the police is 112, for the Fire Brigade is 115, and for the Ambulance Service is 118.

== Ranks ==
Senior Officers

- Commandant (Comandante)
- Officer (Ufficiale) - (There are two Ufficiali, one of whom is the Vice Commandant (Vice comandante))

NCOs

- Inspector (Ispettore)
- Superintendent (Sovrintendente)

Agents

- Assistant (Assistente)
- Chosen Agent (Agente scelto)
- Agent (Agente)
- Auxiliary Agent (Agente ausiliare)

== Equipment ==
The Civil Police maintain a fleet of 33 vehicles, including: 4 Alfa Romeo 156s, 4 Piaggio Libertys, 3 Fiat Pandas, 3 Fiat Mareas, 3 Subaru Foresters, 3 Subaru Outbacks, 2 Fiat Ducatos, 2 Fiat Puntos, 2 Fiat Stilos, 2 Land Rover Defenders, 1 Iveco Baribbi, 1 Iveco Magirus, 1 Fiat Daily, 1 Ford F-250, and 1 Man TGM. Officers typically carry the Glock 17, and occasionally the Benelli M4 when patrolling. The officers wear a dark yellow shirt and black pants.

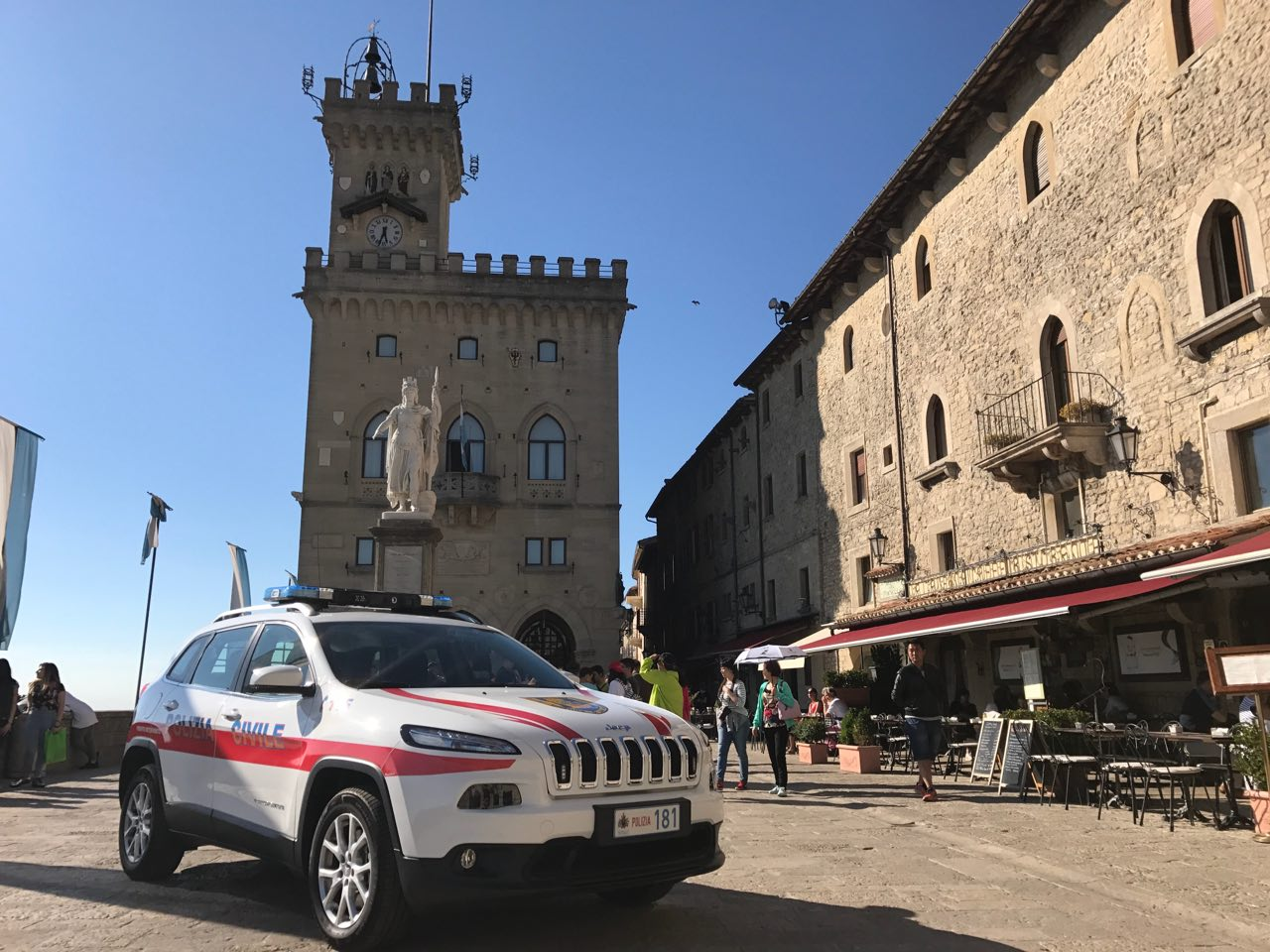
Jeep Cherokee

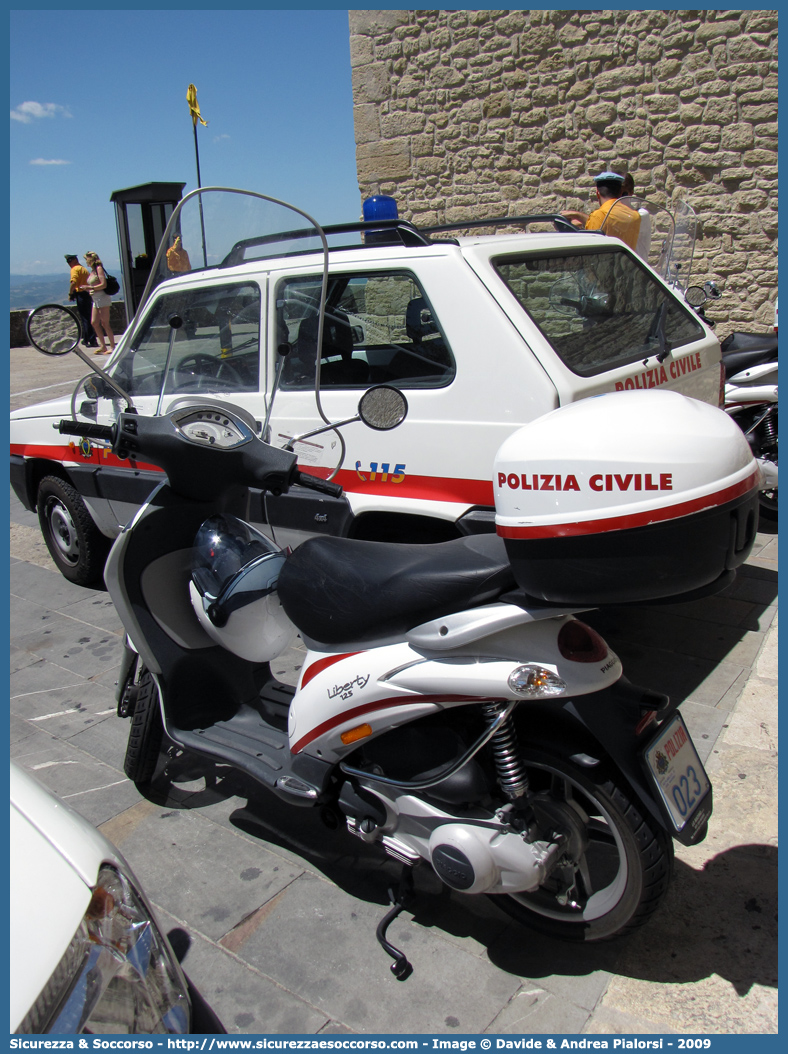
Piaggio Liberty

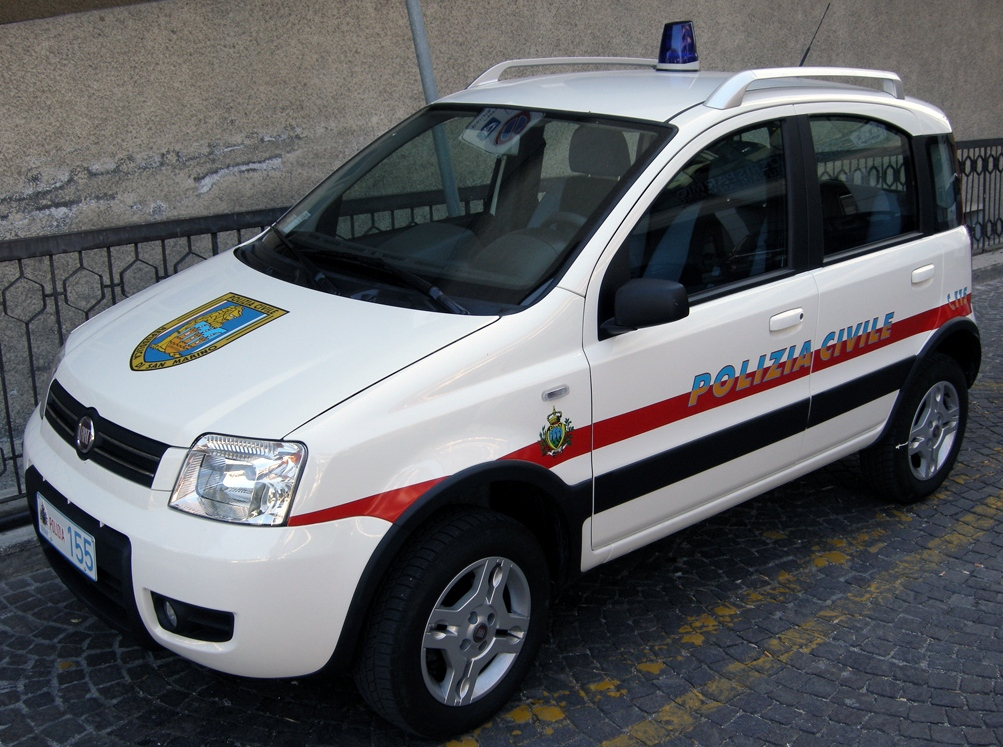
Fiat Panda

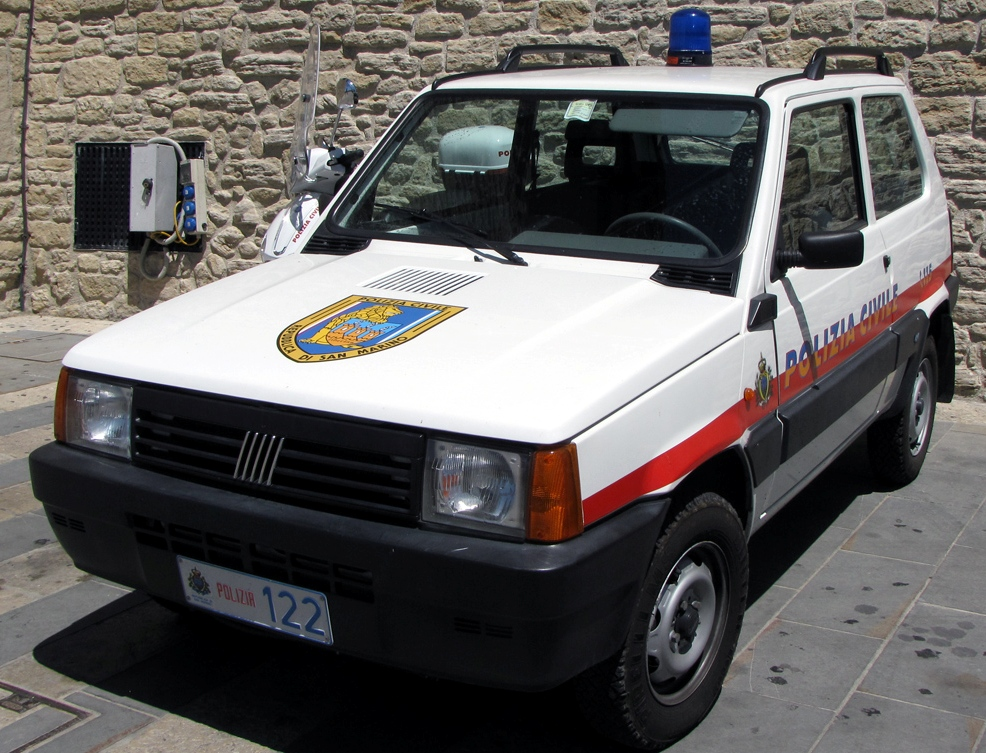
Fiat Panda 4x4

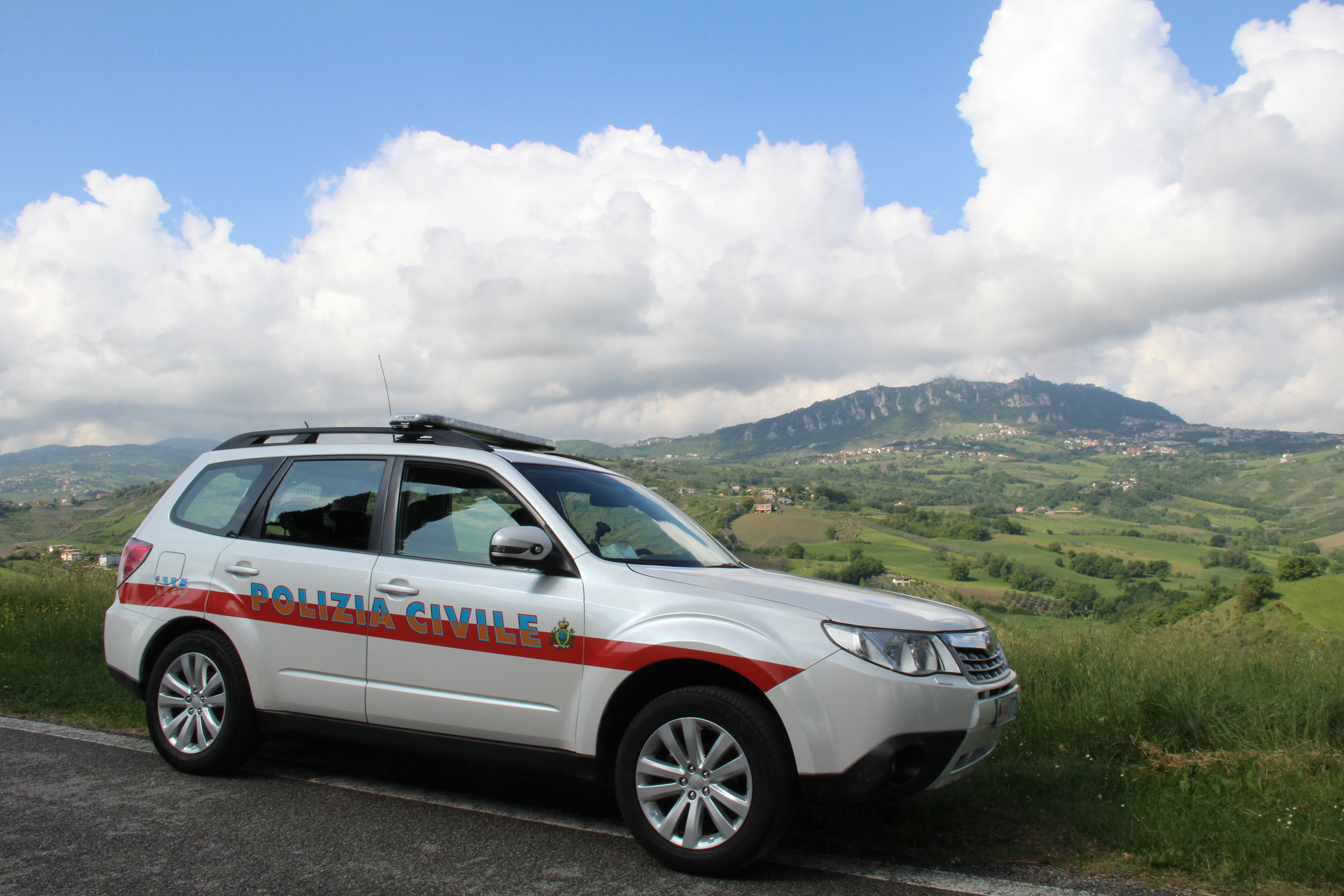
Subaru Forester

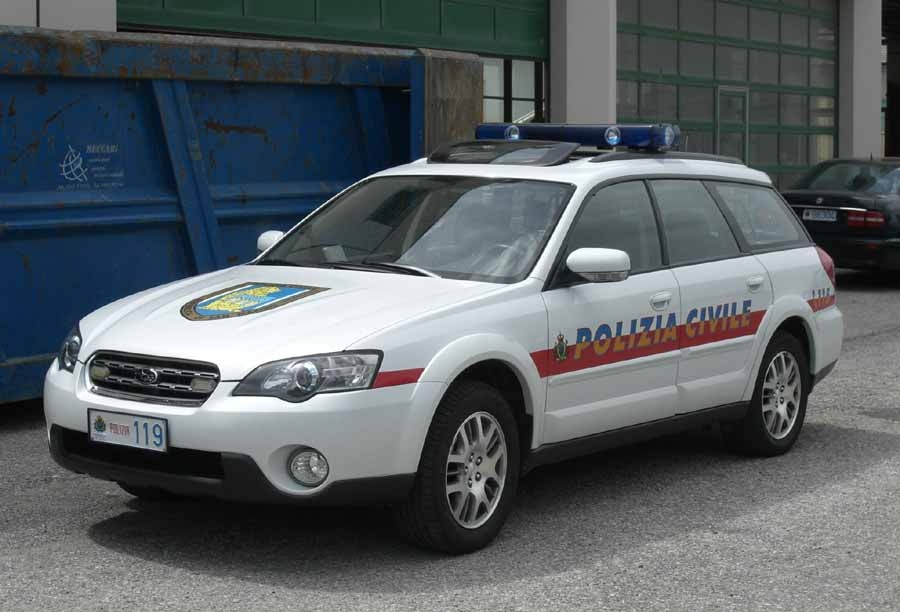
Subaru Outback

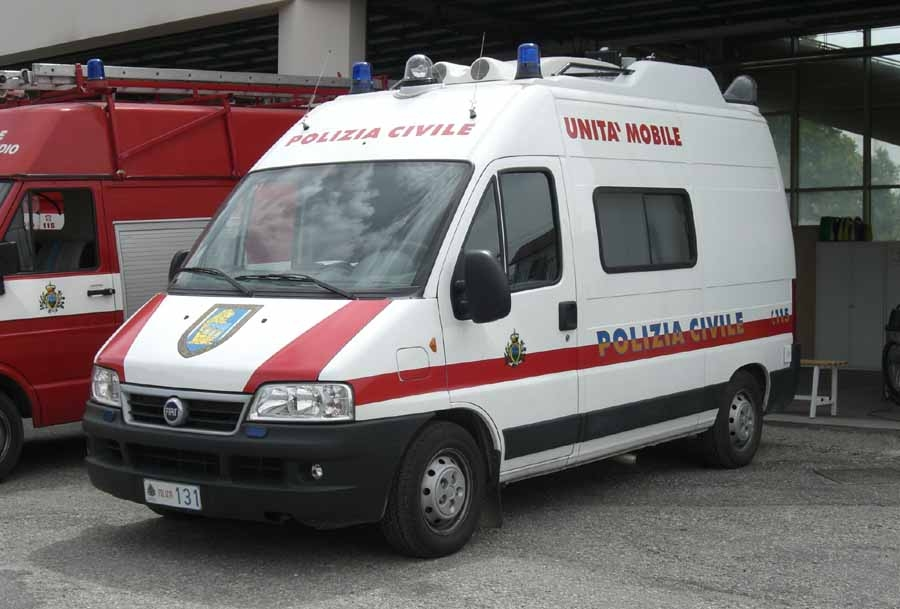
Fiat Ducato

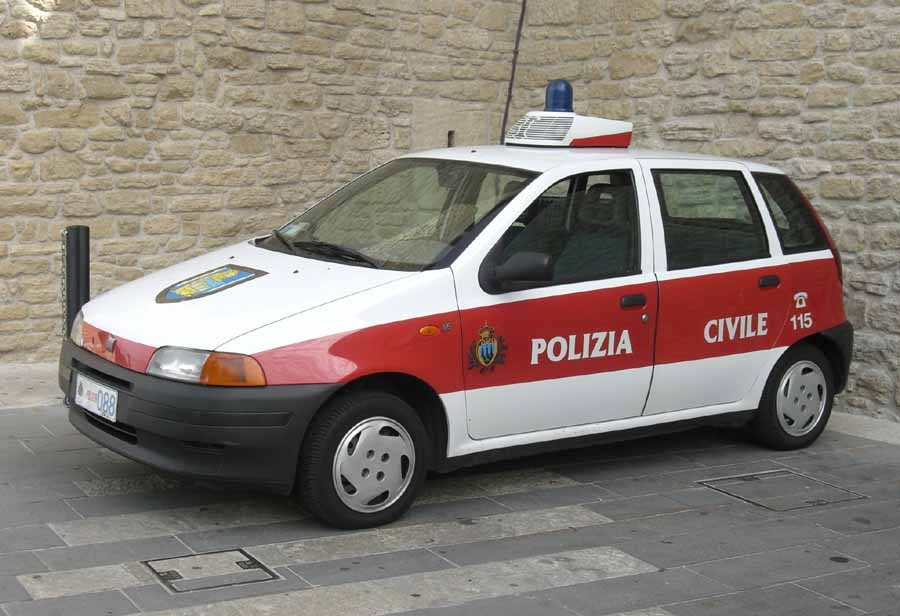
Fiat Punto

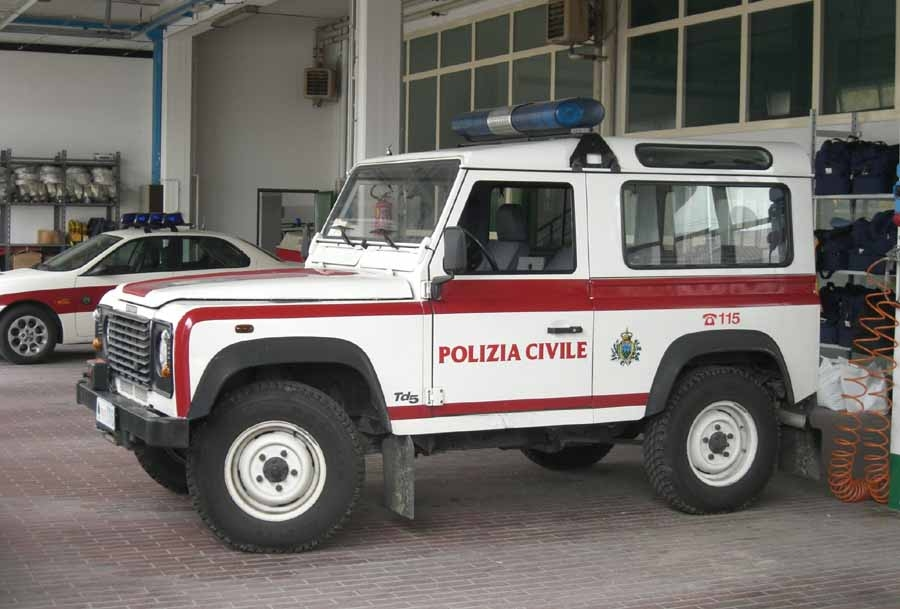
Land Rover Defender

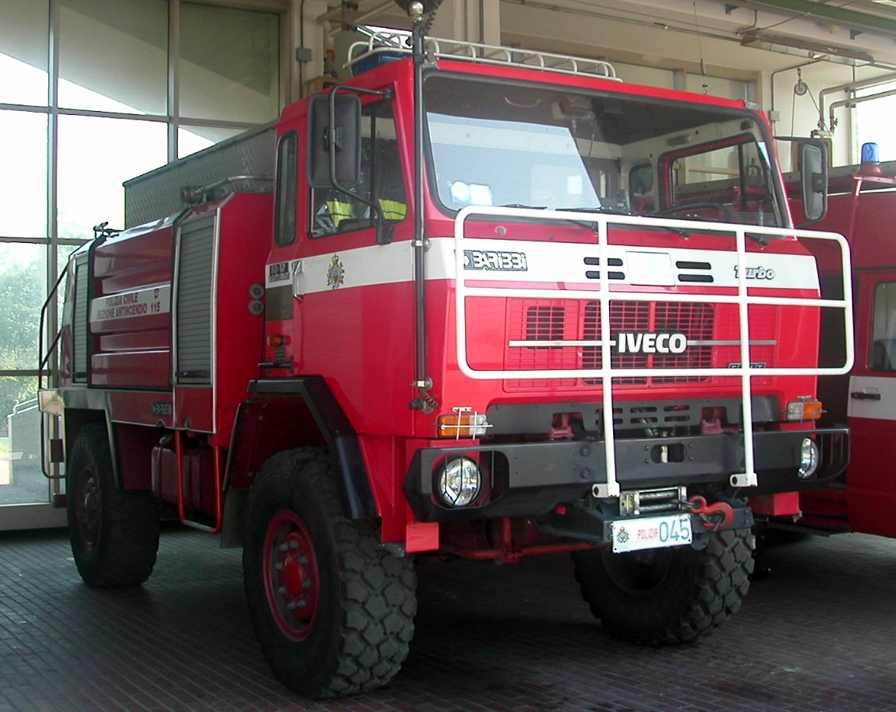
Iveco Baribbi

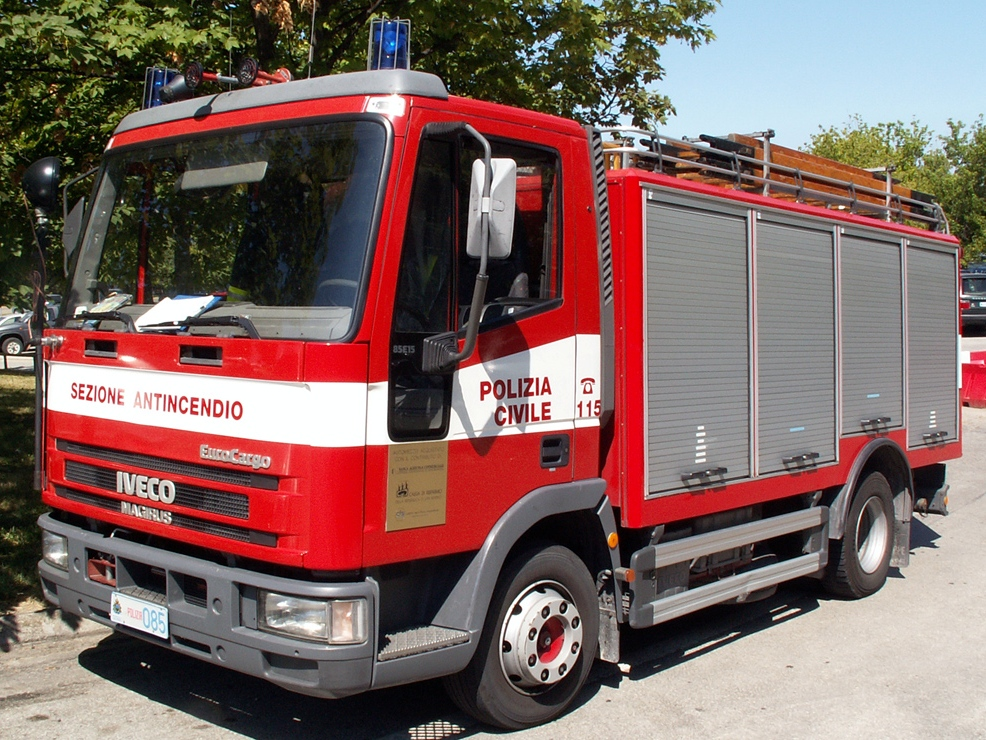
Iveco Magirus

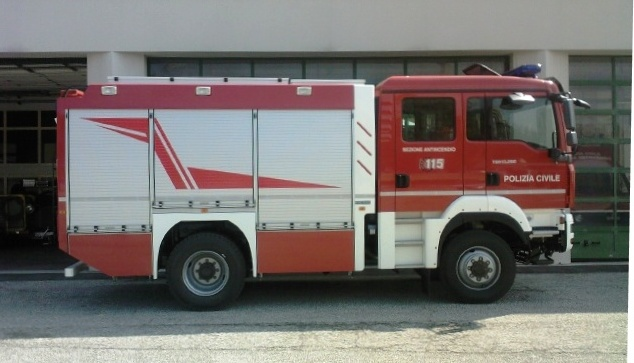
Man TGM

== Point Duty ==
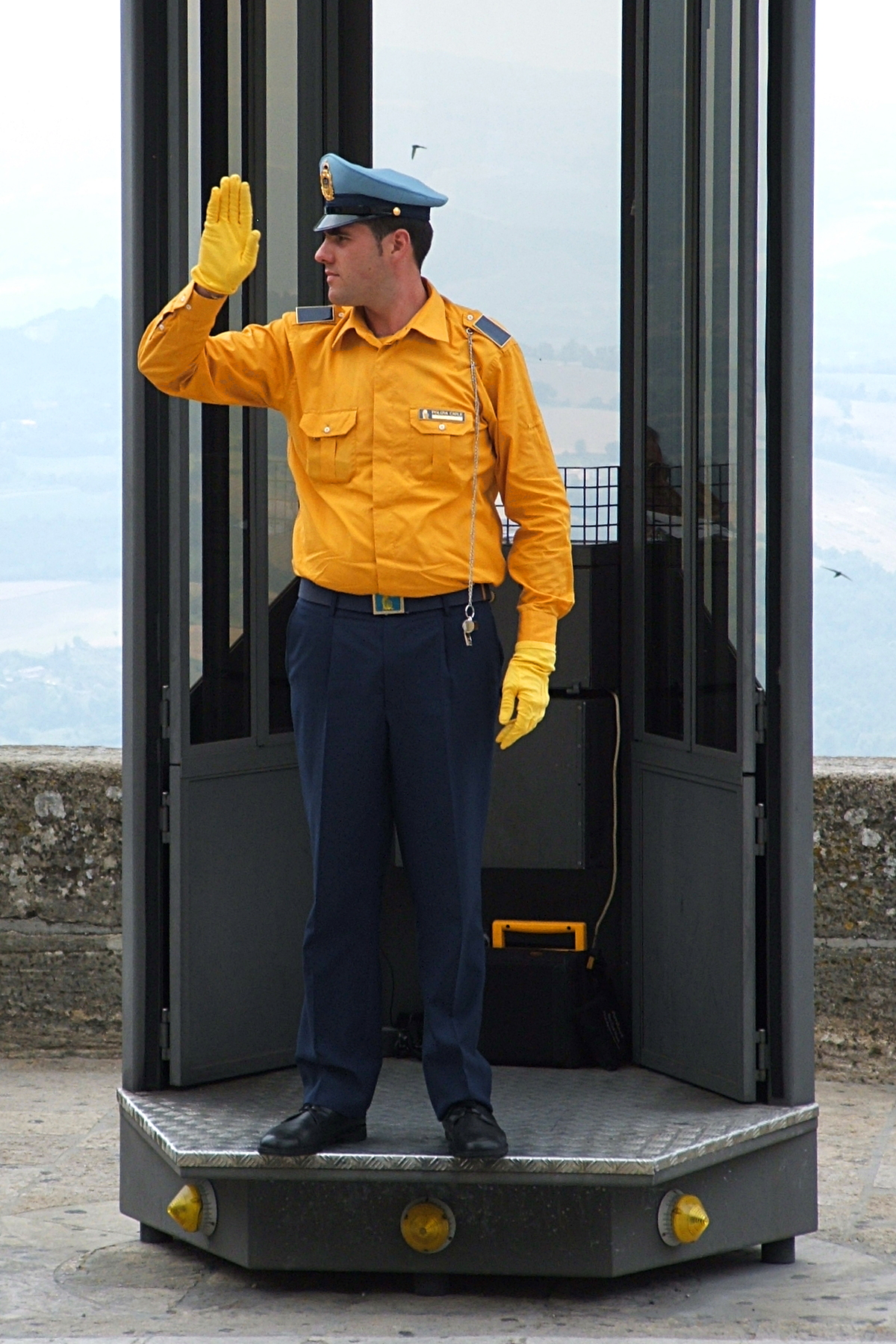

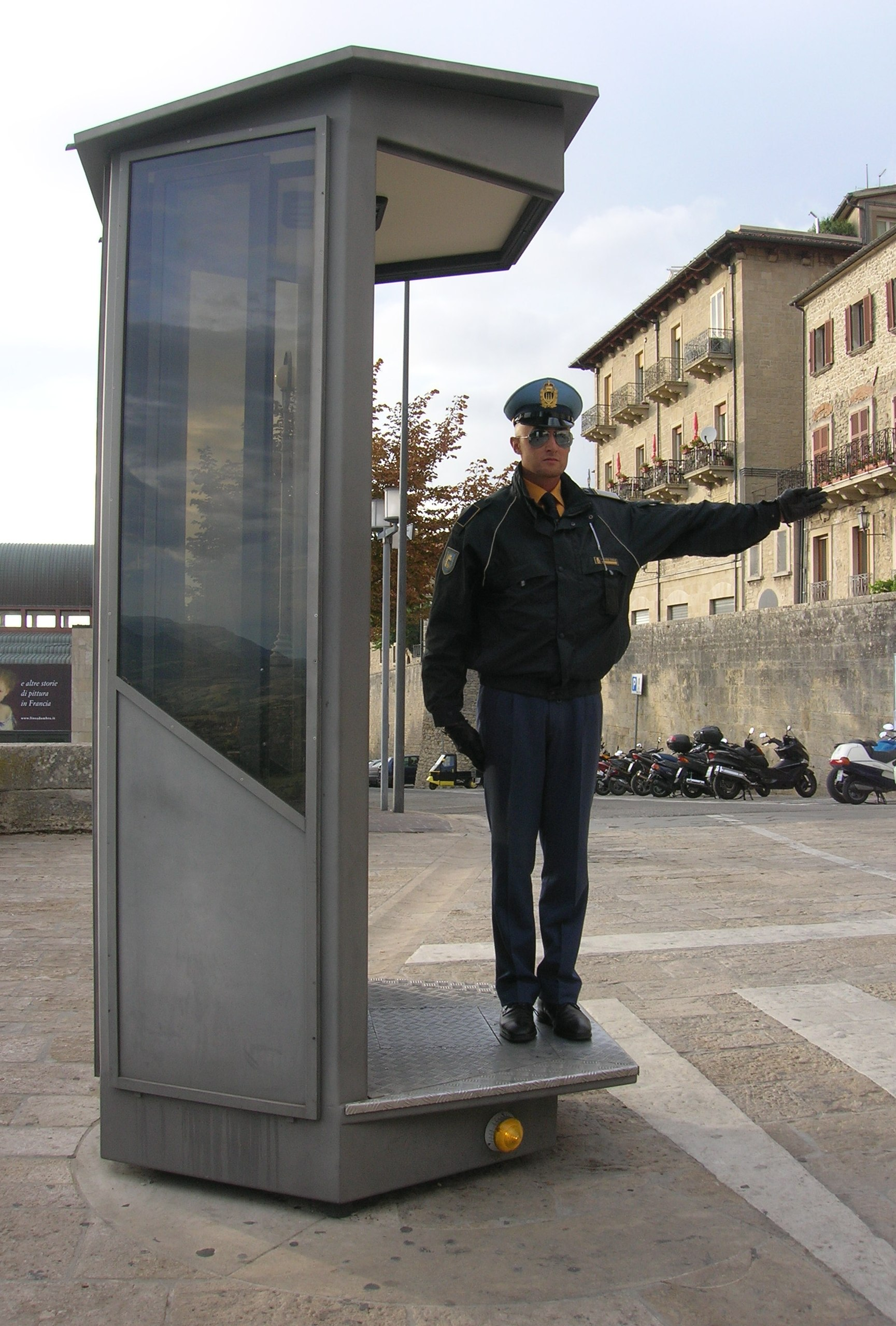

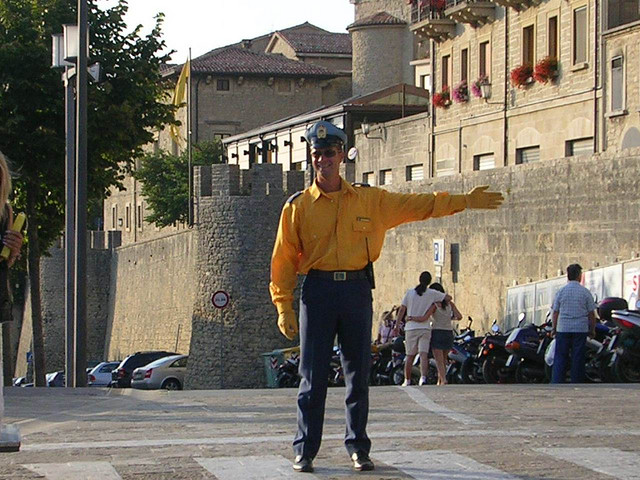

== See also ==
- San Marino
- Law enforcement in San Marino
- Military of San Marino
