= Corrado Carattoni =

Corrado Carattoni OMRI
- Military career
- Allegiance: San Marino
- Service years: 1970–present
- Rank: General
- Commands: Sammarinese Armed Forces
- Awards: Order of Merit of the Italian Republic

Corrado Carattoni is a Sammarinese military officer who is currently serving as the Superior Commander of the Militias, the chief of the Sammarinese Armed Forces. He has held the rank of general since his appointment in 2022.

== Biography ==
Carattoni began his military service in 1970, when he enlisted into the Guard of the Grand and General Council. He eventually became commander of the unit, holding the rank of captain.

Later, Carattoni rose to the position of army chief of staff (later inspector general), and was promoted to colonel.

In October 2022, the Grand and General Council elected, with 38 votes in favor, to promote Carattoni to general and Superior Commander of the Militias. He replaced Gen. Leonardo Lonfernini, who had reached mandatory retirement age. Lonfernini transferred command with a ceremonial sabre exchange, which was overseen by the Captains Regent, Maria Berti and Manuel Ciavatta, as well as Luca Beccari and other political and military figures.

On 29 January 2025, Carattoni was awarded Grand Officer of the Order of Merit of the Italian Republic. It was awarded to him by the Presidency of the Council of Ministers.
