= Military ranks of San Marino =

The Military ranks of San Marino are the military insignia used by the Sammarinese Armed Forces. Due to the history of San Marino and its cultural ties to Italy, San Marino has a similar rank structure to that of Italian Armed Forces.

The rank insignia worn vary depending on whether the alta uniforme (high uniform), uniforme di ordinanza (ordinance uniform), or uniforme da campo (field uniform) is worn. The alta uniforme distinguishes rank by a series of chevrons and knots on the lower sleeves. The uniforme di ordinanza distinguishes ranks using inverted chevrons on the epaulets of enlisted ranks, and using a series of Tre Penne and towers with battlements for officers. Officers in the uniforme di ordinanza also have a separate set of rank insignia displayed on their lower sleeves, made up of a series of bars and either one, two or three towers for junior, senior, and general officers respectively. General officers also have Greca in their rank insignia similar to their Italian counterparts. The uniforme da campo displays the same insignia as the epaulets of the uniforme di ordinanza worn on either rank slides or patches.

== History ==
Prior to appointment of Fedele Daniele to the rank of Colonnello as commander of the Gendarmerie in 1958, the most senior rank available to the commanders of individual corps was that of Capitano.

== Officers ==
Officers of all Corps follow the same rank titles, with differences in the colors of the rank insignia worn dependent on the Corps.

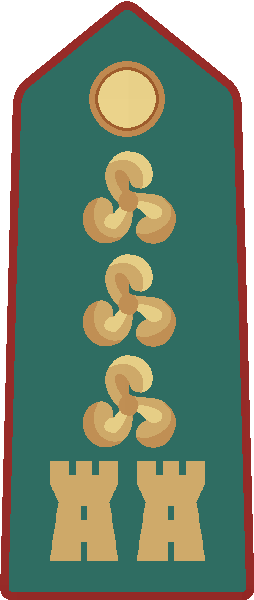
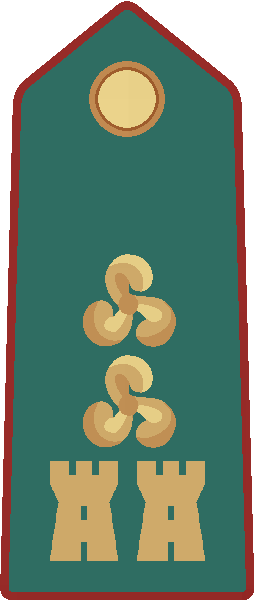
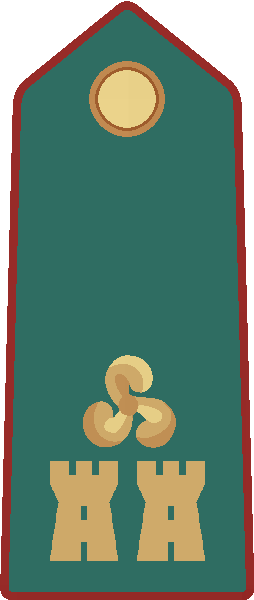
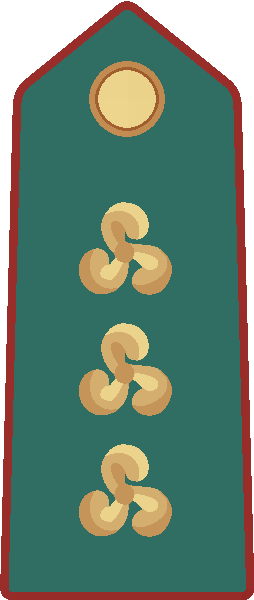
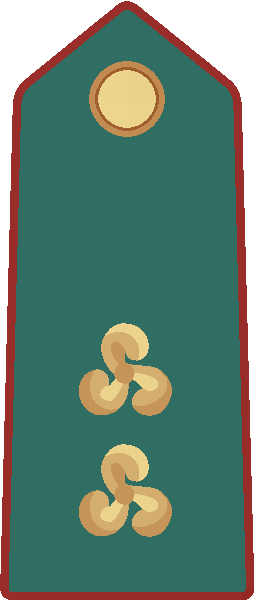
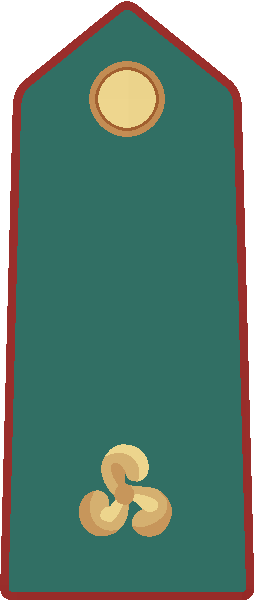
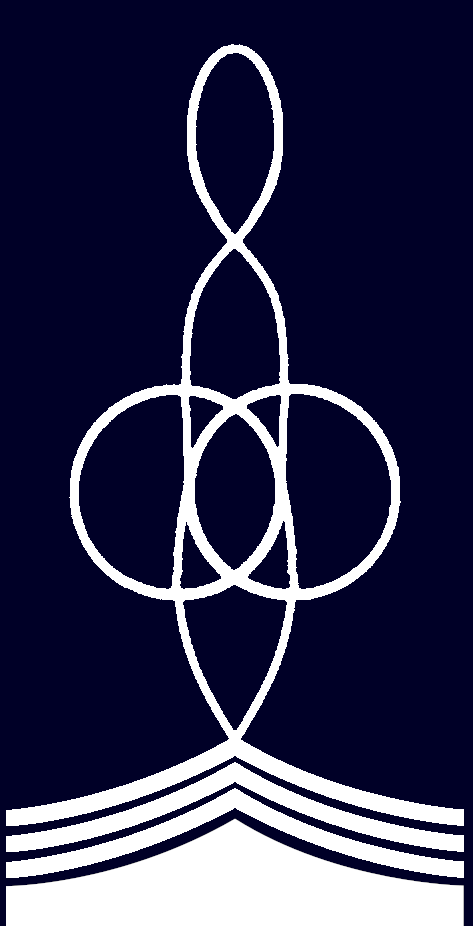
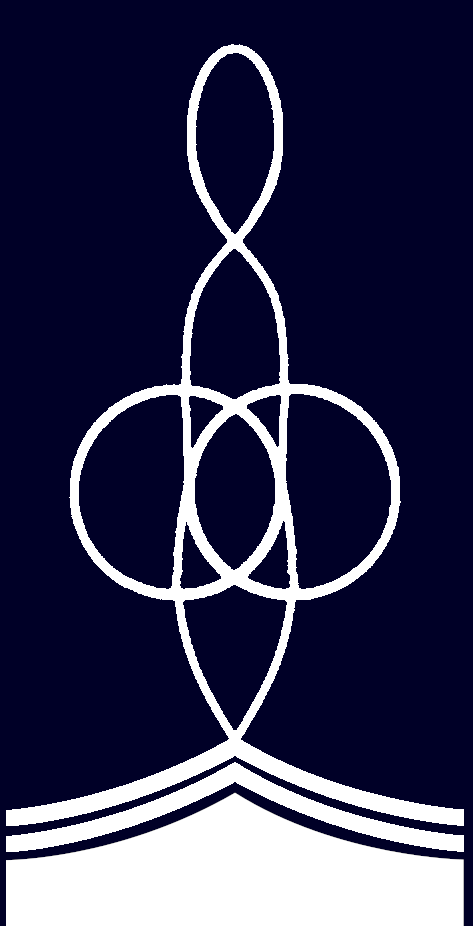
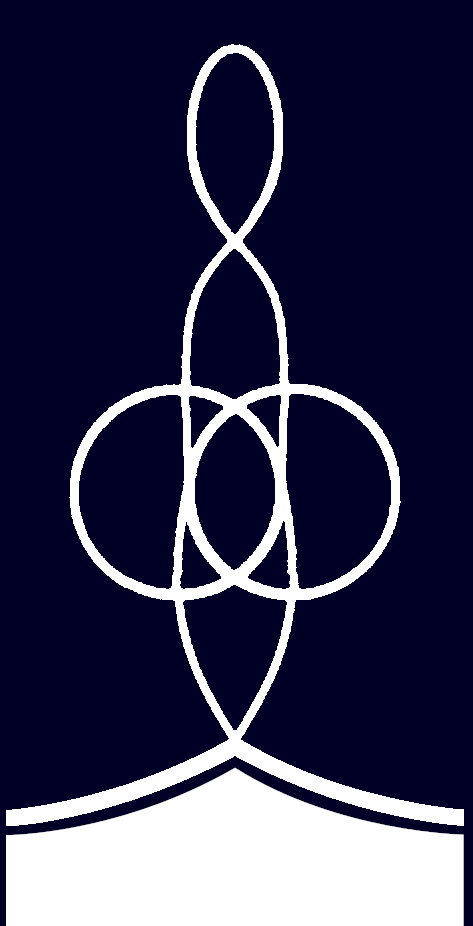
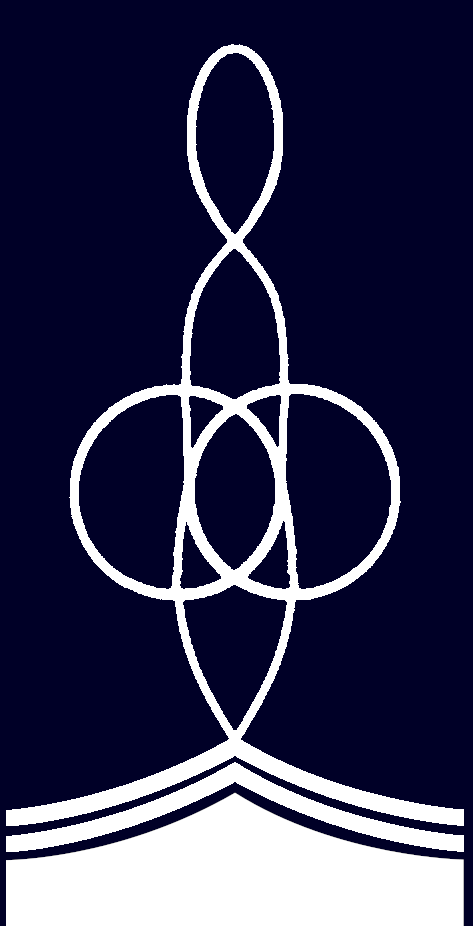
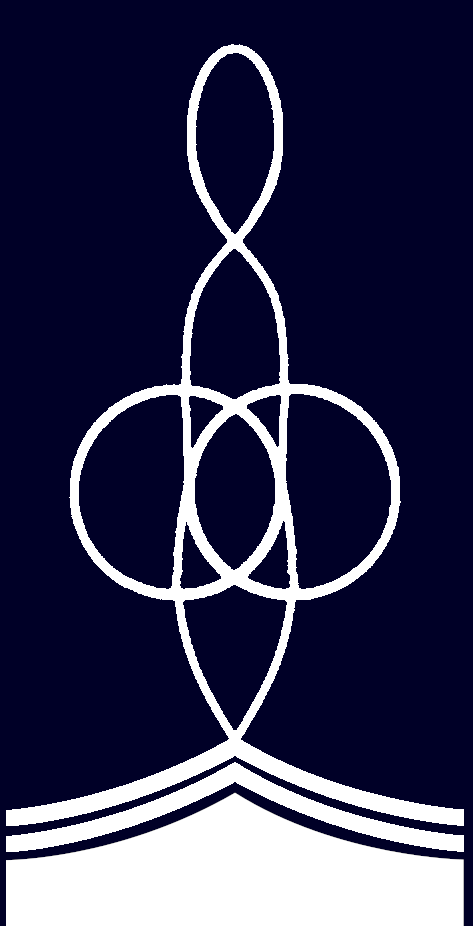
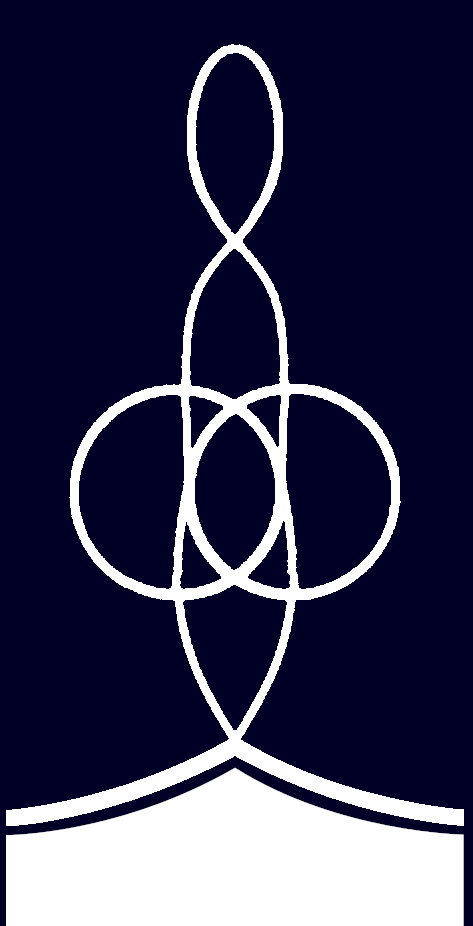
Rank group	General / flag officers		Senior officers			Junior officers
San Marino (Senior Command, Military Health Service, Compagnia Uniformata)
San Marino (Senior Command, Military Health Service, Compagnia Uniformata)	Generale	Generale brigata	Colonnello	Tenente Colonnello	Maggiore	Capitano	Tenente		Sottotenente
(Sleeve insignia)
Sammarinese Guard of the Council
Sammarinese Guard of the Council			Colonnello	Tenente Colonnello	Maggiore	Capitano	Tenente		Sottotenente
Sammarinese Guard of the Rock
Sammarinese Guard of the Rock			Colonnello	Tenente Colonnello	Maggiore	Capitano	Tenente		Sottotenente
(Parade Sleeve insignia)
Rank group	General / flag officers		Senior officers			Junior officers
Corps of Gendarmerie of San Marino
Corps of Gendarmerie of San Marino		Generale Brigata	Colonnello	Tenente Colonnello	Maggiore	Capitano	Tenente		Sottotenente
(Sleeve insignia)
(Parade Sleeve insignia)
San Marino (Military Band)
San Marino (Military Band)							Maestro Tenente	Tenente	Sottotenente
(Parade Sleeve insignia)
Rank group	General / flag officers		Senior officers			Junior officers

== Enlisted ==
The enlisted ranks follow a standard format with Caporale being present in most but not all of the corps and Sergente Maggiore/Maresciallo only being present in the corps that are involved in policing duties.

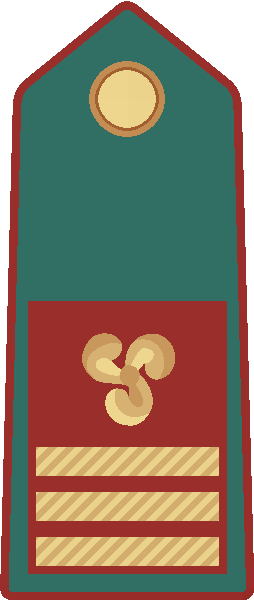
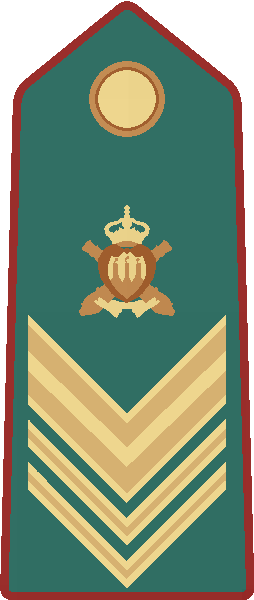
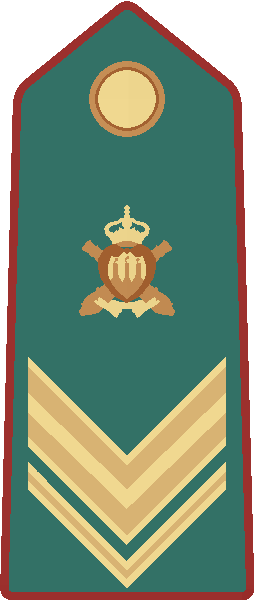
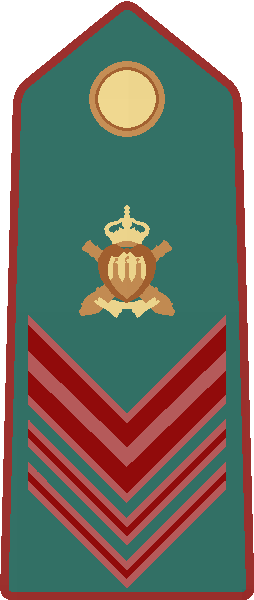
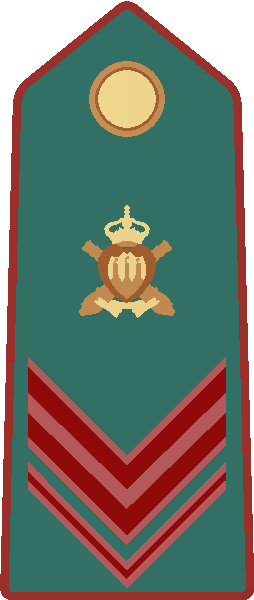
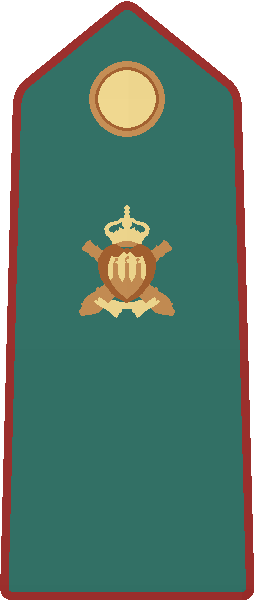
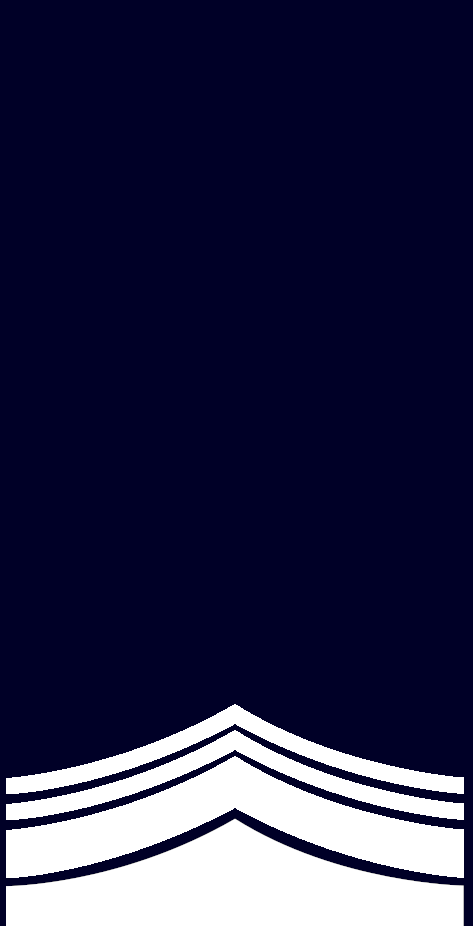
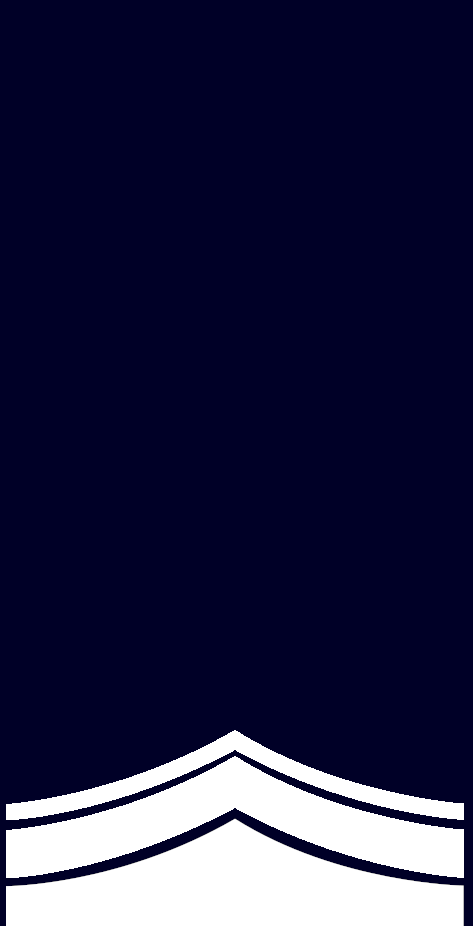
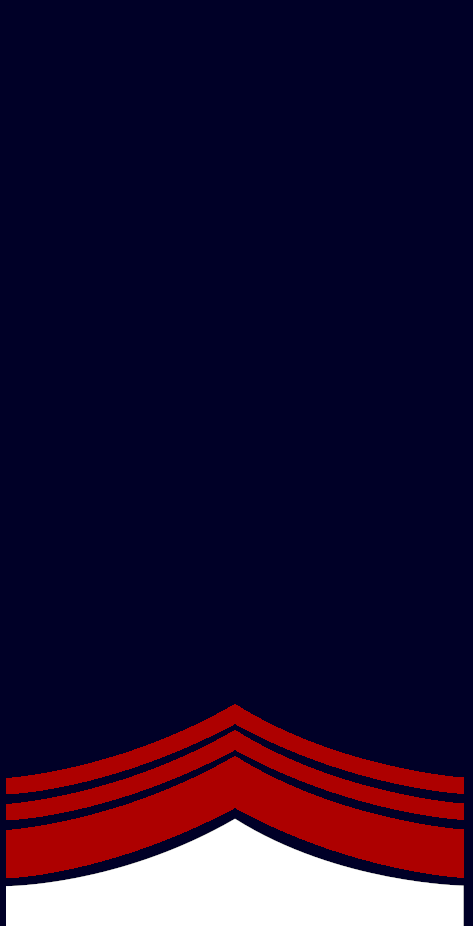
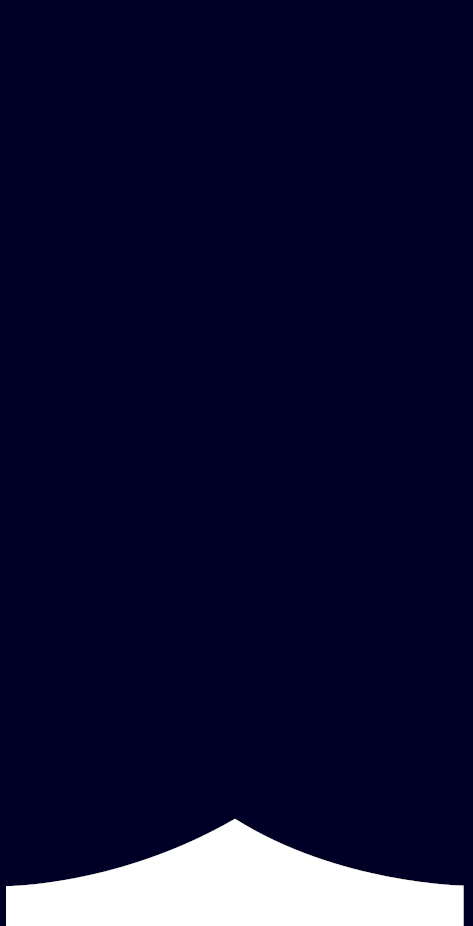
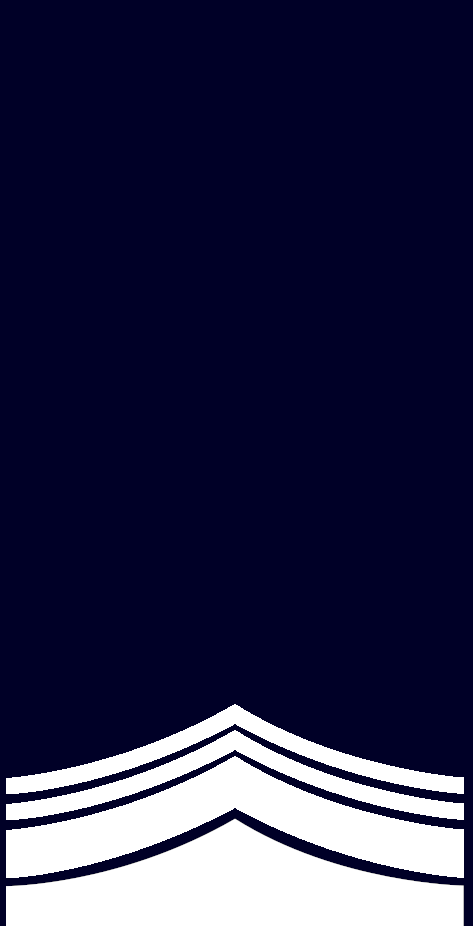
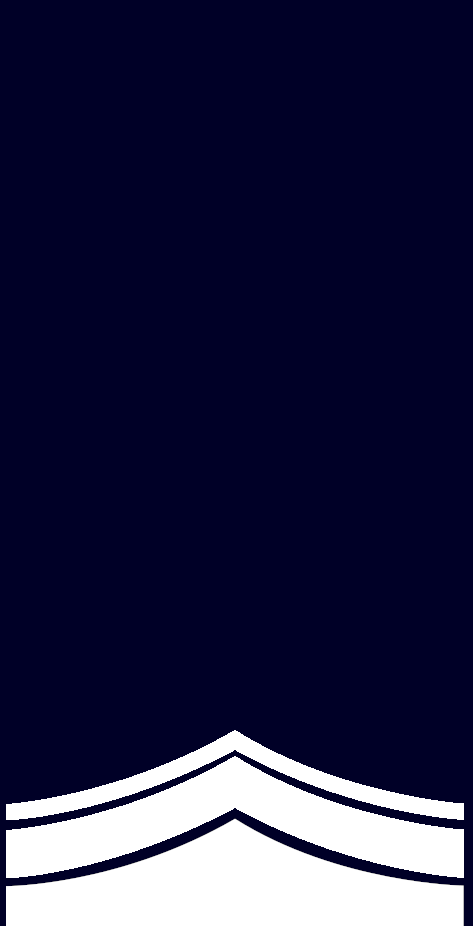
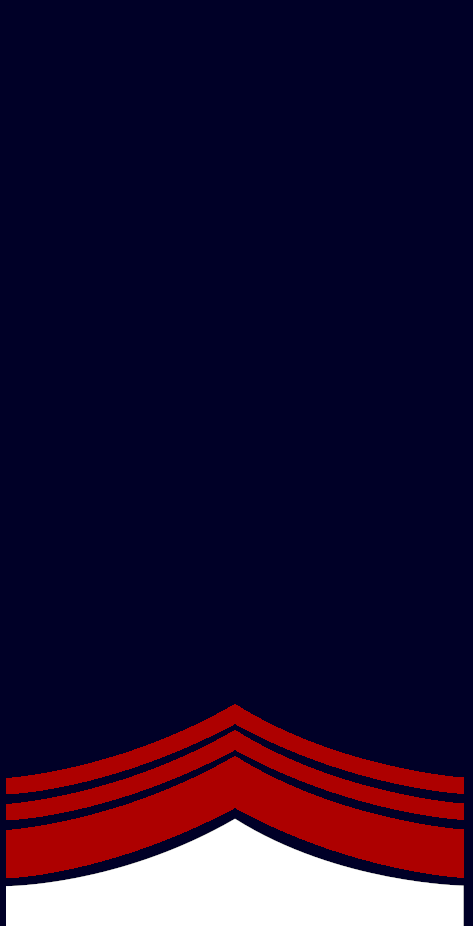
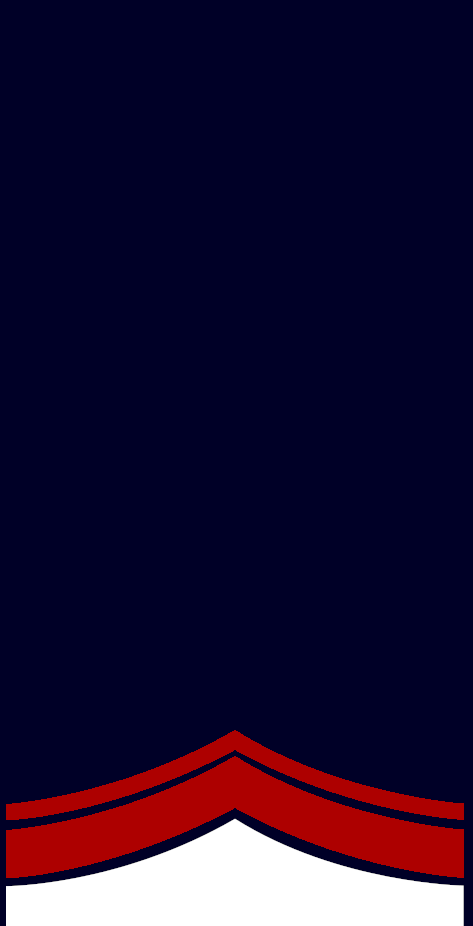
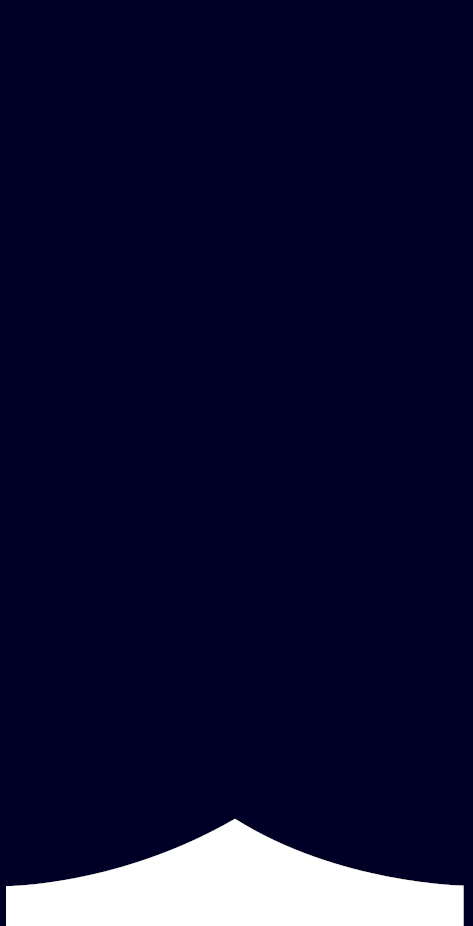
Rank group	Senior NCOs			Junior NCOs	Enlisted
San Marino (Military Health Service, Compagnia Uniformata)					'
San Marino (Military Health Service, Compagnia Uniformata)		Sergente maggiore	Sergente	Caporale maggiore	Caporale	Guardia
Sammarinese Guard of the Council
Sammarinese Guard of the Council		Sergente maggiore	Sergente	Caporale maggiore	Caporale	Guardia
Sammarinese Guard of the Rock
Sammarinese Guard of the Rock	Sergente Maggiore aiutante	Sergente maggiore	Sergente	Caporale maggiore	Caporale	Guardia Milite
(Parade Sleeve insignia)
Rank group	Senior NCOs			Junior NCOs	Enlisted
Corps of Gendarmerie of San Marino
Corps of Gendarmerie of San Marino	Maresciallo	Brigadiere	Vice-brigadiere	Appuntato		Gendarme
(Sleeve insignia)
(Parade Sleeve insignia)
San Marino (Military Band)
San Marino (Military Band)		Sergente maggiore	Sergente	Caporale maggiore	Caporale	Guardia
(Parade Sleeve insignia)
Rank group	Senior NCOs			Junior NCOs	Enlisted
