= Sammarinese Armed Forces =

Military of the Republic of San Marino

- Forze Armate Sammarinesi
- Motto: Libertas
- Founded: 1406; 620 years ago
- Service branches: Army; Gendarmerie
- Headquarters: Quartiere delle Milizie; Contrada Omerelli, 14, 47890 San Marino Città

Leadership
- Commander-in-Chief: Captains Regent
- Comandante Superiore delle Milizie: Generale Corrado Carattoni

Expenditure
- Budget: €9.13 million (converted; 2012)
- Percent of GDP: 1.1% (2010 est.)

Related articles
- Ranks: Military ranks of San Marino

The Sammarinese Armed Forces (Italian: Forze Armate Sammarinesi) are the national military forces of the Republic of San Marino. It is one of the smallest military forces in the world, with its different branches having varied functions including: performing ceremonial duties; patrolling borders; mounting guard at government buildings; and assisting police in major criminal cases. There is also a military Gendarmerie which is part of the military forces of the republic. The entire military corps of San Marino depends upon the co-operation of full-time forces and their retained (volunteer) colleagues, known as the Corpi Militari Volontari, or Voluntary Military Force. National defence in the face of an aggressive world power is, by arrangement, the responsibility of Italy's armed forces. The component parts of the military (other than the purely historical Crossbow Corps) are distinguished (as in many nations) by distinctive cap badges, one each for the Fortress Guard (uniformed), Fortress Guard (artillery), Guard of the Council, Uniformed Militia, Military Ensemble (band), and Gendarmerie. There is no compulsory service, however under special circumstances citizens aged 16 to 55 may be drafted for the defence of the state.

== Military Branches ==
Corps	English	Size	Commanding officer
Comando superiore delle milizie	Superior command of the militias		Generale Corrado Carattoni
Servizio sanità militare	Military health service		
Compagnia uniformata delle milizie	Uniformed company of the militias	80	Tenente Lorenzo Lonfernini
Banda militare	Military Band	60	Tenente Maestro Stefano Gatta
Guardia del Consiglio Grande e Generale	Guard of the Great and General Council	60	Tenente Mirko Mancini
Guardia di Rocca	Guard of the Rock		Capitano Massimo Ceccoli
Guardia di Rocca Compagnia di Artiglieria	Guard of the Rock Company of Artillery	45	Capitano Marco Ciacci
Guardia di Rocca Nucleo Uniformato	Guard of the Rock Uniformed Core	40	
Corpo della gendarmeria della Repubblica di San Marino	Corps of the gendarmerie of the Republic of San Marino	90	Colonnello Maurizio Faraone

=== The Crossbow Corps ===
Although once at the heart of San Marino's army, the Crossbow Corps is now an entirely ceremonial force of about 70 volunteer soldiers. The Crossbow Corps has a continuous history from its first mention in the national statutes of 1295. Described by the Government as "The oldest military formation in the Republic, nominated in the statutes of 1295", its uniform is medieval in design, and although it is a statutory military unit, it has no actual military function today. By the mid-twentieth century, the Crossbow Corps had become largely defunct, save for parading on state holidays; but in 1956 the practice of training its members in crossbow shooting was revived, and a 'Crossbow Federation' was formed to encourage competition in this art, so that the unit (although still entirely ceremonial in nature) now again has a very active existence.

=== The Guard of the Rock (or Fortress Guard Corps) ===
==== Uniformed Unit ====
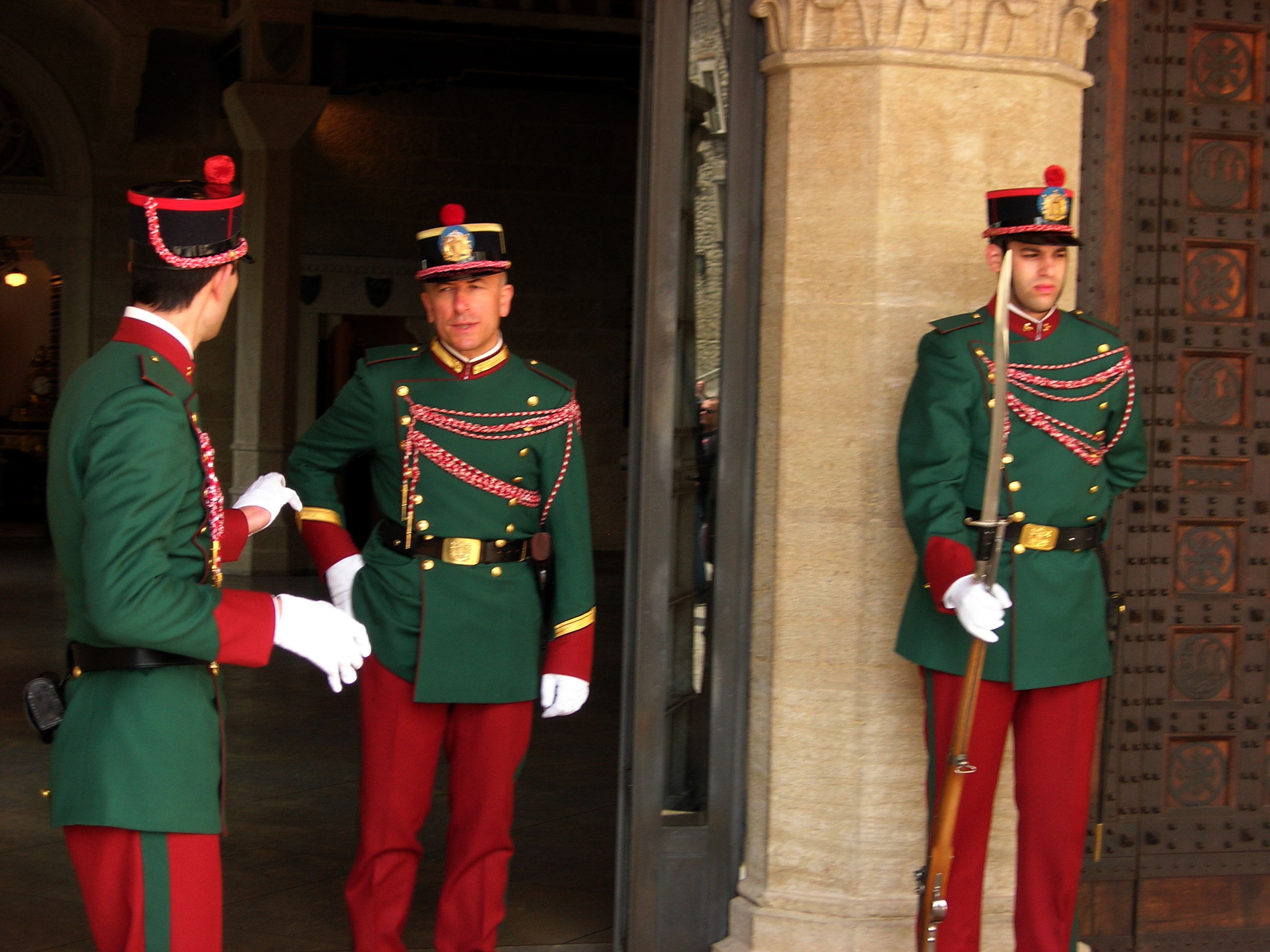
Three members of the Guard of the Rock, wearing the Number 2 uniform (informal ceremonial). A non-commissioned officer is in the centre.

The Guard of the Rock (Italian: Guardia di Rocca) is a front-line military unit in the San Marino armed forces. Its precise origin is difficult to pinpoint due to amalgamations. Its role was last redefined by statute in 1987, and it probably came into being as a military branch in 1754; however, the unit also uses the name "Fortress Guards" which may be traced back to much earlier units of Sammarinese military. The Guard of the Rock are the state border patrol, with responsibility for patrolling borders and defending them. In their role as Fortress Guards they are also responsible for the guarding of the Palazzo Pubblico in San Marino City, which is the seat of national government. In this role, they are the forces most visible to tourists, and known for their colourful ceremony of Changing the Guard. Under the 1987 statute, the Guard of the Rock are all enrolled as 'Criminal Police Officers' (in addition to their military role) and act to assist the police in investigating major crime.

The uniform of the Guard of the Rock is distinctively red and green, with three dress standards. The ceremonial uniform (1) for festivals, usually worn only by the ceremonial Artillery Company, includes red trousers with a green stripe (two thinner gold stripes for officers), a double breasted green jacket (with red and white lanyard, red cuffs and collars, gold buttons, and red and white dress epaulettes (for officers the epaulettes are gold, and there is a gold edge to the red cuffs)), a black leather belt, and a black helmet decorated with red and white feathers. For normal guard duties (2) the uniform of the main (full-time) Fortress Guard Corps is similar to that described above, but with plain green epaulettes, and a simple black kepi with a single red feather plume in place of the helmet. For routine patrol duties (3) on the border the uniform is simple and modern, with red trousers, green bomber-jacket, and a green peaked hat. For ceremonial duties the Guard of the Rock carry Beretta BM 59 rifles, with the sentry on duty having a fixed bayonet. For patrol duties they are armed with 9mm Glock 17 pistols, and they patrol in green and white patrol cars (see illustrations in gallery, below).

==== Artillery Unit ====
Most members of the Guard of the Rock are full-time soldiers, but there is also a single Company of volunteers called the "Fortress Guard, Artillery Company" which exists for the now purely ceremonial duty of firing the cannon of the Palazzo Pubblico on ceremonial occasions. (Note: This distinction has existed since 1959.) This volunteer unit maintains the original artillery function of the Fortress Guard. Although both units are part of the same Guard Corps, and wear the same uniform, the Artillery Unit has a totally different military cap badge, as a reminder of its historical origins. The Artillery Unit is armed with 2 OTO Melara Mod 56 pack howitzers. As of 2026, the Artillery Company had 33 personnel of the 45 planned.

=== The Guard of the Council ===
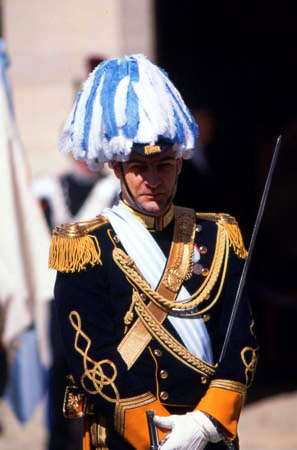
An officer of the Guard of the Council - this is the number 1 uniform (formal ceremonial).

Its full name is 'The Guard of the Council Great and General' and it is also known locally as the 'Guard of Nobles'. The official tourism website of the nation explains this alternative name by stating: Originally called “Guardia Nobile” (Noble Guard), this name is still sometimes used today to underscore the highly prestigious institutional duties the Corps is called upon to perform. This unit, formed in 1740, is composed almost entirely of volunteers, and its duties are largely ceremonial, although members undergo full military training. Due to its striking uniform, it is arguably the best-known part of the Sammarinese military, and appears on countless postcard views of the republic. The functions of the Guard of the Council are to protect the Captains Regent, and to defend the Great and General Council during its formal sessions. They also provide a ceremonial bodyguard to government officials on festivals of both state and church.

The distinctive dress uniform (1) includes dark blue trousers and double-breasted tailed jacket, with gold coloured ornaments including: double stripe on trouser legs, dress epaulettes, cuffs, collars, and jacket tail edges - distinctively, the double gold trouser stripe is in 'cloth of gold' for officers, but a bright yellow-gold cloth for other ranks. This uniform also includes white gloves, a white leather cross-strap, and a cocked hat decorated with blue and white feathers. For ceremonial duties this force carries sabres, rather than firearms. The undress uniform (2) employs the same colour scheme, but less decoration.

=== The Company of Uniformed Militia ===
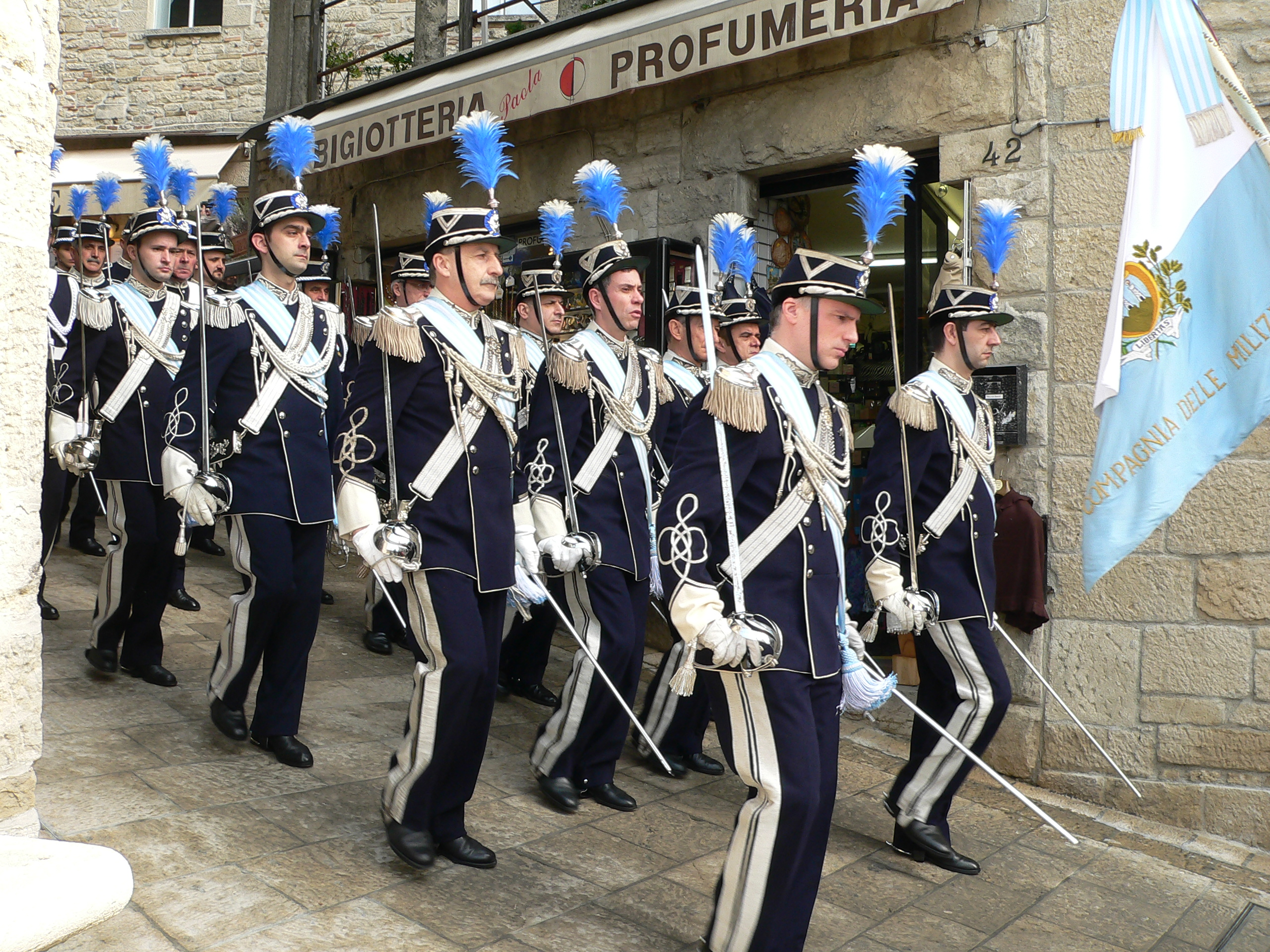
Compagnia Uniformata delle Milizie della Repubblica di San Marino in their alta uniform.

In former times all families with two or more adult male members were required to enroll half of them in the Company of Uniformed Militia. This unit remains the basic fighting force of the armed forces of San Marino, and although it is largely ceremonial in deployment, members are all fully trained in the use of firearms, and for basic policing duties in support of the gendarmerie and civil police. It is a matter of civic pride for many Sammarinese to belong to the force, and all citizens with at least six years residence in the republic are entitled to enroll. Both male and female soldiers belong to the Company of Uniformed Militia, although men predominate in numbers.

Officers are armed with swords and pistols, whilst other ranks are equipped with muskets and bayonets. The uniform is dark blue, with a kepi bearing a blue and white plume. The ceremonial form of the uniform includes a white cross-strap, and white and blue sash, white epaulettes, and white decorated cuffs.

=== The Military Ensemble ===
Formally this is part of the Army Militia, and is the ceremonial military band of San Marino. It comprises around 60 musicians. The uniform is largely similar to that of the Army Militia itself, though with some differences in decoration. The music of the Military Ensemble accompanies most state occasions in the republic.

=== Corps of Gendarmerie ===
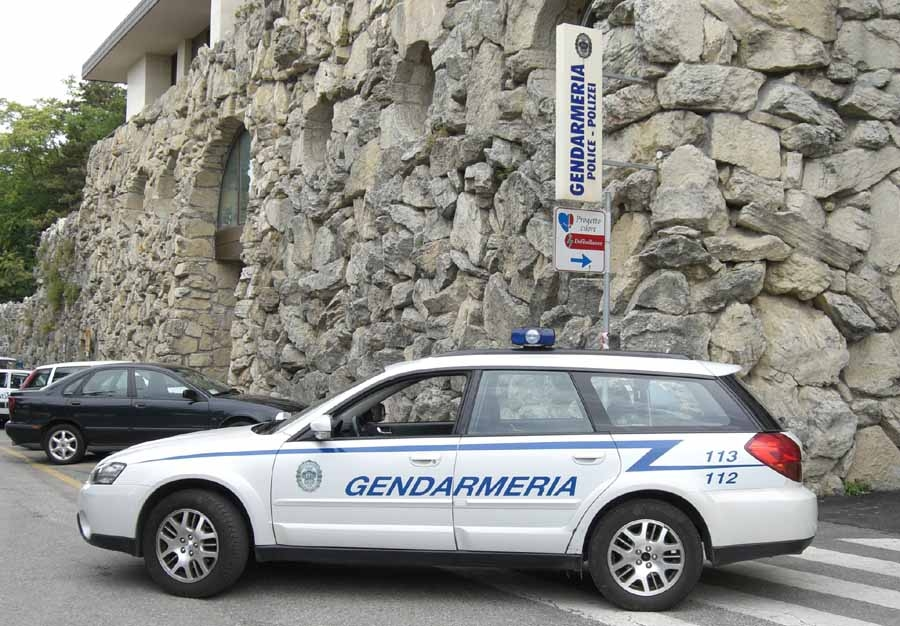
A Subaru of the Gendarmerie

Established in 1842, the 'Corps of Gendarmerie of San Marino' (Italian: Corpo della Gendarmeria della Repubblica di San Marino) is a militarized police service, under the control of the Secretary of State for Foreign and Political Affairs. Its members are full-time and have responsibility for the protection of citizens and their property, and for the preservation of law and order.

The uniform of the gendarmerie includes a hot-weather (summer) standard, which is informal and khaki in colour; a winter standard which is black with light-blue decoration and stripes, and silver braiding; and a dress standard for ceremonial duties, which is dark blue with a white cross-strap and lanyard, blue and white dress epaulettes, white collars, a blue kepi with red and blue plume, and a sword.

The Gendarmerie has two 'Divisions' entitled 'Criminal Police Division' and 'Flying Squad Division', each of which is further divided into operational 'Brigades'. The Gendarmerie may call upon the assistance of the Municipal Police in cases of major crime or national security, and (following revised regulations for both corps introduced by the Government of San Marino in 2008) may also call upon soldiers and border guards of the Fortress Guards Corps, in their secondary role as 'Criminal Police Officers'. It is currently led by Colonel Maurizio Faraone.

The Gendarmerie issues the Glock 17 9x19mm as the sidearm and also has access to the Heckler & Koch MP5 9x19mm sub-machine gun.

==== Commanders ====
Status

Denotes an acting commander

Image	Rank	Name	Start	End	Duration	Notes
	Ispettore	Giovan Battista Mattioli	1842	1848	6 years	Also Maresciallo Maggiore d'Alloggio
	Maresciallo	Giovanni Paoli	1854	1857	3 years	
	Ispettore	Luigi Archimede Pineschi	1857	1859	2 years, 11 months	Later appointed Maresciallo d'Alloggio and Sottotenente onorario
	Capitano	Antonio Belluzzi	1860	1863	3 years	Also Comandante di Piazza
	Comandante	Valentino Vacchi	1863	1898	35 years	Also Ispettore Politico
	Ispettore Politico	Saturno Spiaggiari	1898	1901	3 years	
			1901	1906	5 years	
	Tenente	Eugenio Carrel	1906			Also Ispettore Politico
				1921		
	Tenente	Feliciano Iussa	1921	1923	2 years	Officer of the Royal Carabinieri of Italy
	Tenente	Biagio Campo	1923	1928	5 years	
	Tenente	Luigi Lolli	1928	1931	3 years, 11 months	
	Tenente	Emilio Radaelli	1932	1935	3 years, 11 months	
	Primo Tenente	Luigi Conioli	1936	1936		
	Tenente	Pietro Animali	1936			
	Maresciallo Maggiore	Pasquale Lucarini	1944			
	Capitano	Gaetano Tranfa	1946	1956	10 years	
	Capitano	Ettore Sozzi	1957			Also Ispettore of the Polizia Urbana
	Maresciallo Maggiore	Emilio Paltrinieri		1957		
	Colonnello	Fedele Daniele	1958	1984	26 years	Also Ispettore of the Polizia Urbana
	Maggiore	Giambattista Di Fine	1984	1988	4 years	
	Colonnello	Marcello Biagioli	1988	2004	16 years	
	Maresciallo Maggiore	Leo Guidi	2004	2005	1 year	
	Colonnello	Achille Zechini	2005	2012	7 years	
	Maresciallo Maggiore	Werter Selva	2012	2013	1 year	
	Generale	Alessandro Gentili	2013	2015	2 years	
	Maresciallo Maggiore	Werter Selva	2015	2015	11 months	
	Colonnello	Maurizio Faraone	2015	present	10 years, 8 months	

==== Municipal Police ====
The Municipal Police (Corpo di Polizia Civile) is not part of the armed forces of San Marino, but it does work closely with them, particularly with the Gendarmerie. It is responsible for policing local communities, tax collection, traffic control, and civil defence. The Municipal Police are required by statute to collaborate with the Gendarmerie and the Fortress Guard Corps in policing the state.

== Ranks ==
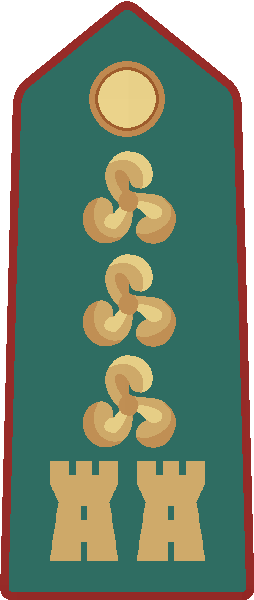
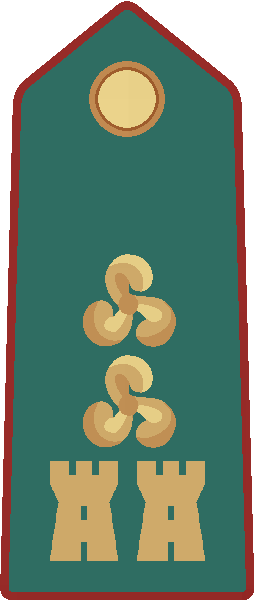
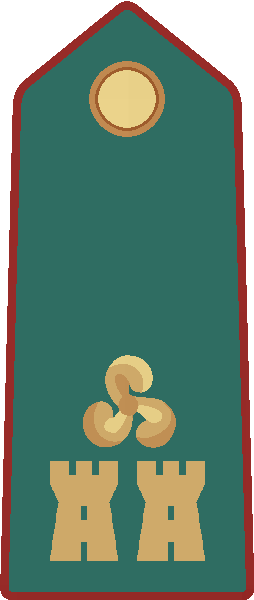
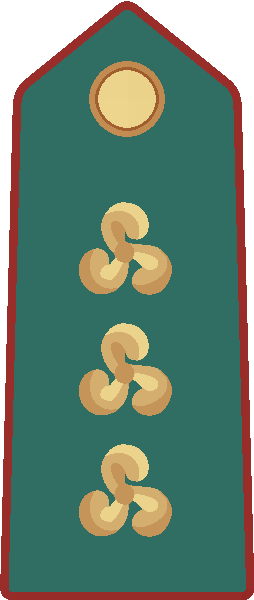
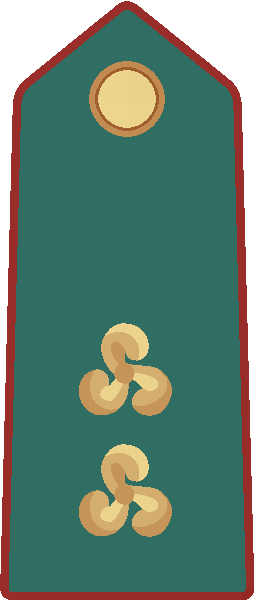
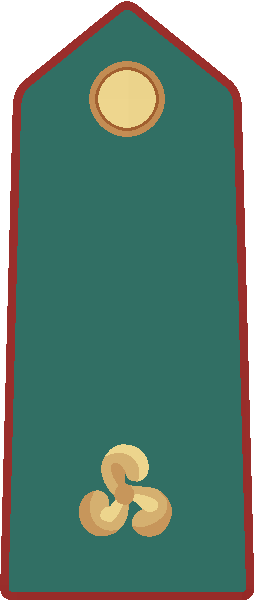
Rank group	General / flag officers		Senior officers			Junior officers
San Marino (Senior Command, Military Health Service, Compagnia Uniformata)
San Marino (Senior Command, Military Health Service, Compagnia Uniformata)	Generale	Generale brigata	Colonnello	Tenente Colonnello	Maggiore	Capitano	Tenente	Sottotenente
Sammarinese Guard of the Rock
Sammarinese Guard of the Rock			Colonnello	Tenente Colonnello	Maggiore	Capitano	Tenente	Sottotenente
Corps of Gendarmerie of San Marino
Corps of Gendarmerie of San Marino		Generale Brigata	Colonnello	Tenente Colonnello	Maggiore	Capitano	Tenente	Sottotenente
Rank group	General / flag officers		Senior officers			Junior officers

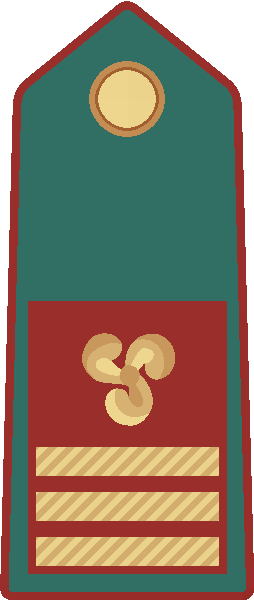
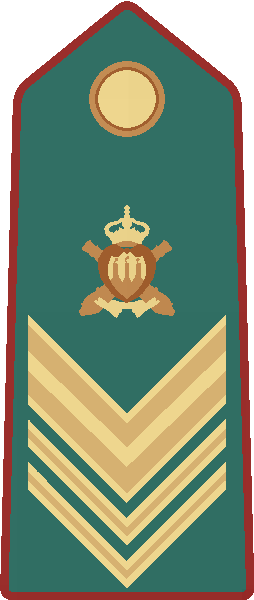
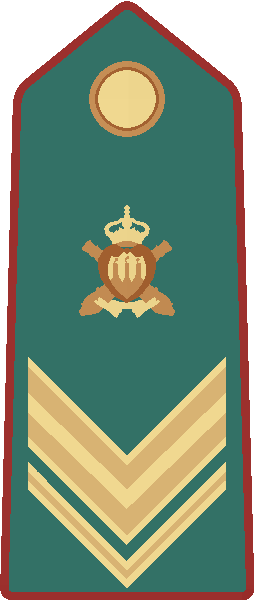
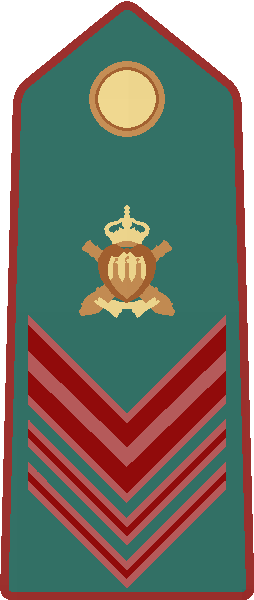
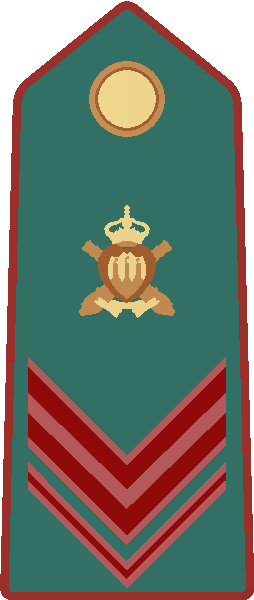
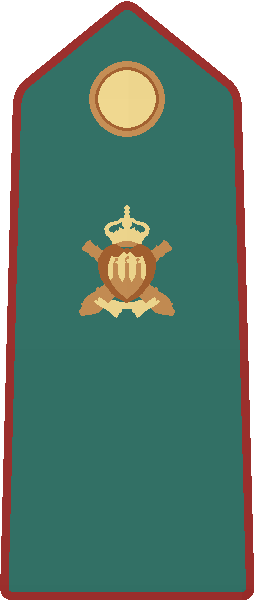
Rank group	Senior NCOs			Junior NCOs	Enlisted
San Marino (Military Health Service, Compagnia Uniformata)					'
San Marino (Military Health Service, Compagnia Uniformata)		Sergente maggiore	Sergente	Caporale maggiore	Caporale	Guardia
Sammarinese Guard of the Rock
Sammarinese Guard of the Rock	Sergente Maggiore aiutante	Sergente maggiore	Sergente	Caporale maggiore	Caporale	Guardia Milite
Corps of Gendarmerie of San Marino
Corps of Gendarmerie of San Marino	Maresciallo	Brigadiere	Vice-brigadiere	Appuntato		Gendarme
Rank group	Senior NCOs			Junior NCOs	Enlisted

=== Commander of the Armed Forces and Police ===
Image	Rank	Name	Start	End	Duration	Notes
	Generale	Giorgio Zani	1996	2007	11 years	
	Generale	Rosolino Martelli	2007	2014	7 years, 1 month	
	Generale	Leonardo Maria Lonfernini	2014	2022	8 years, 5 months	
	Genrale	Corrado Carattoni	2022		4 years, 1 month	

== Gallery ==
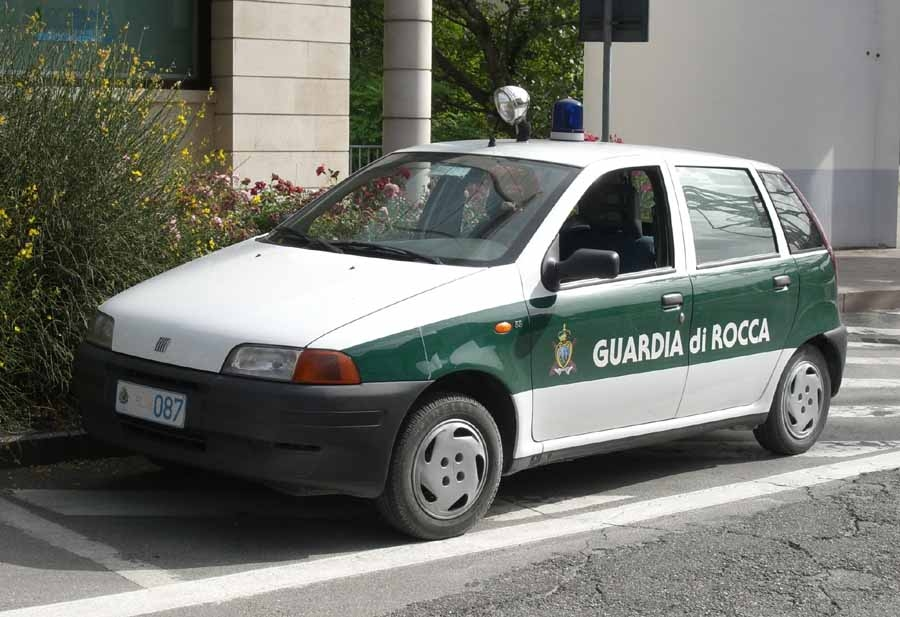
A Fiat Punto used by the Guard of the Rock.

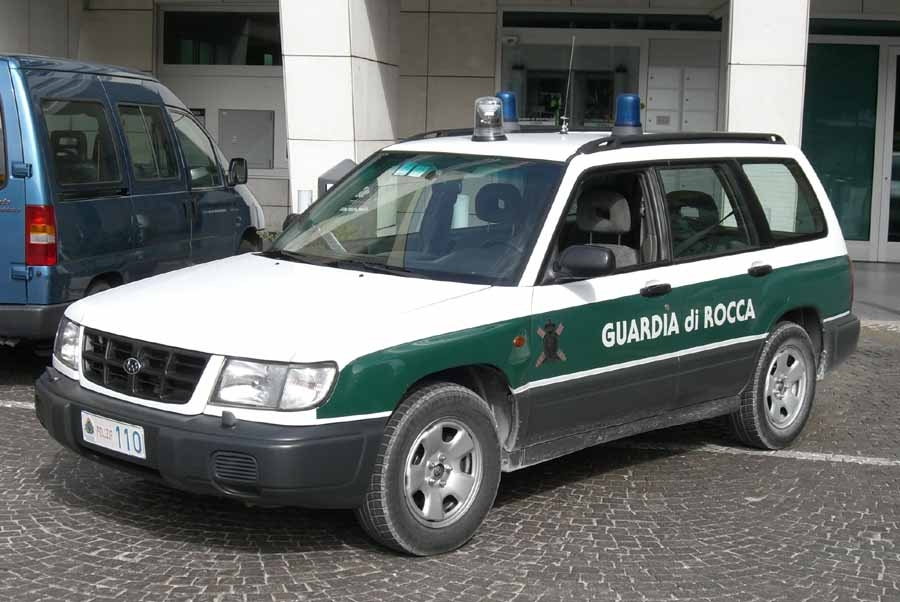
A Subaru Forester used by the Guard of the Rock.

== Crossbow federation ==
Records of crossbowmen in the military of San Marino date back to the 14th century. In 1956 a civilian club called the Federazione Balestrieri Sammarinesi (FBS) was formed to revive the tradition of the use of the crossbow in San Marino, claiming descent from the antecessor crossbow units. The FBS is made up of nine teams, representing the 9 traditional divisions of San Marino. Each team is made up of an officer, five crossbowmen, a flag-bearer, a herald, a page, two drummers, and two trumpeters. In 1977, the Captains Regent awarded the FSB the gold medal for civic merit. The current president of the FSB is Edward Chiaruzzi.
