= We for the Republic =

Electoral alliance in San Marino (2019-2024)

We for the Republic Noi per la Repubblica
- Abbreviation: NplR
- Leader: Denise Bronzetti
- Founded: 26 October 2019
- Dissolved: 14 March 2024
- Ideology: Social democracy Social liberalism Factions: Conservative liberalism Democratic socialism
- Political position: Centre-left
- Member parties: PS; PSD; MDSI; NS
- Colours: Light blue Yellow; Red

Website
- Facebook page

The We for the Republic (NplR; Italian: Noi per la Repubblica) was an electoral alliance in San Marino formed by the Socialist Party, Party of Socialists and Democrats, Democratic Movement San Marino Together and We Sammarineses.

The coalition won fourth place in the 2019 elections and entered the government coalition with PDCS, RETE and DML.

In March 2024, the government majority, in anticipation of the elections of the Captains Regent for the April-October 2024 semester, designated Christian Democrat Italo Righi and reformer Rossano Fabbri as the candidates of the NplR. However, the Grand and General Council instead elected Alessandro Rossi of DEMOS - Solidary Democracy and Milena Gasperoni of the Party of Socialists and Democrats, with the support of the opposition and the PSD, who opposed Fabbri's nomination. This defeat for the majority precipitated a government crisis and led to the calling of early elections. During these elections, We for the Republic appeared divided and effectively ceased to exist. The newly created Reformist Alliance allied with the PDCS, while the Party of Socialists and Democrats and the Socialist Party announced an electoral agreement with Libera San Marino.

== Electoral history ==
Grand and General Council
Election	Leader	Votes	%	Seats	+/–	Government
2019	Ausenda Gianni	2,359	13.13 (#4)	8 / 60		Coalition
