= Reactions to the death of Pope Francis =

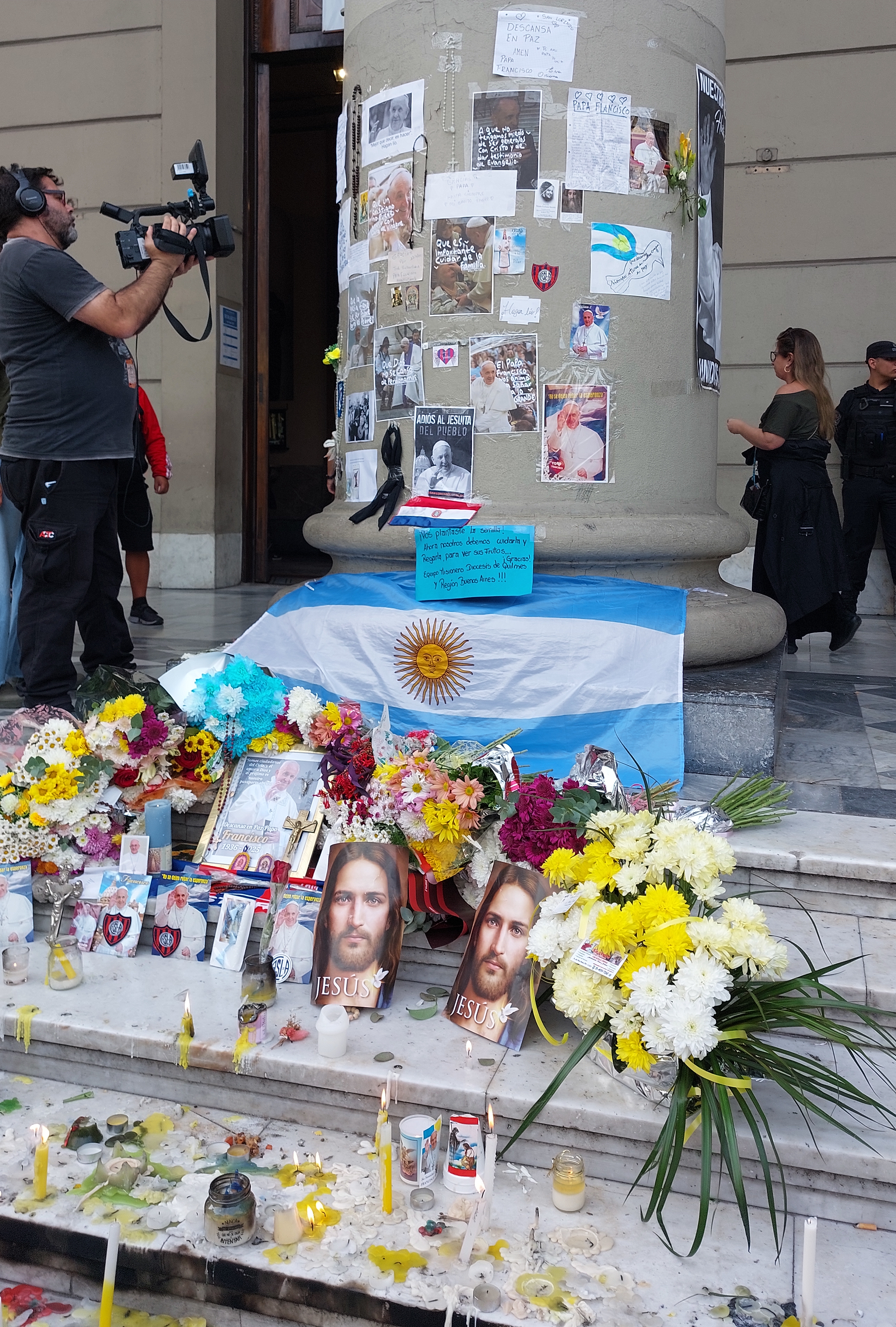
Tributes to Francis at the Buenos Aires Metropolitan Cathedral

Pope Francis, aged 88, died on 21 April 2025, prompting reactions from around the world. Condolences were offered by heads of state and government, as well as by officials of the Catholic Church and other Christian and religious leaders.

== National leaders and governments ==
=== Africa ===
- Algeria – President Abdelmadjid Tebboune expressed condolences "to the Vatican, to all its institutions, and to all Christians throughout the world".
- Angola – President João Lourenço sent a condolence message to Cardinal Giovanni Battista Re, expressing "pain and sadness" over the Pope's passing, calling it "a severe blow for the world" and an incalculable loss for Catholics. He also highlighted Pope Francis' legacy as a leader who stood out for his dedication to social justice, peace, and the defense of the most vulnerable.
- Benin – The Government of Benin expressed its sympathies, stating that the Pope's life will be remembered for his humility, his proximity to the poor, and his unwavering support of social justice, peace, and inter-cultural communication. "Benin, a nation of religious harmony and tolerance, honors the memory of a man of faith and heart who upheld the universal values of humanity and fraternity," the statement continued.
- Burkina Faso – Interim President Ibrahim Traoré paid homage to Pope Francis, stating that he remembers the Pope as a man who dedicated his life to the cause of justice and peace in the world, as well as the poor and most impoverished. He noted that despite the terrorism perpetrated on Burkina Faso, the Pope never stopped expressing his closeness and sympathy with the country.
- Burundi – President Évariste Ndayishimiye paid homage to the Pope's legacy of religion, peace, and humanity while expressing his condolences to the Catholic Church in Burundi and around the world.
- Cameroon – President Paul Biya described the Pope as a "fervent servant of the Church" and sent the Vatican condolences of the Cameroonian people.
- Cape Verde – President José Maria Neves sent his condolences and praised "an enormous legacy for the Church and humanity." Prime Minister Ulisses Correia e Silva hailed Pope Francis' legacy, describing him as a "great fighter for transparency, morality in the Church, for peace, for the dignity of immigrants and for the planet, in the face of climate change."
- Central African Republic – On 22 April, President Faustin-Archange Touadéra signed the Book of Condolences at the Apostolic Nunciature to Bangui.
- Chad – President Mahamat Déby honored the Pope's legacy by calling him a world leader who dedicated his life to advancing human causes. He also emphasized the Pope's role as a devoted religious leader who stands near the weakest members of society and is an ardent advocate for peace.
- Democratic Republic of the Congo – President Félix Tshisekedi honored Pope Francis as a "great servant of God," praising his life as a testament to faith, humility, and a steadfast commitment to peace, justice, and human dignity.
- Republic of the Congo – President Denis Sassou Nguesso hailed Pope Francis's "engagement for climate, migratory issues, peace and poverty in the world".
- Djibouti – President Ismaïl Omar Guelleh wrote on Twitter that Pope Francis leaves behind more than simply a spiritual legacy; he leaves behind the mark of a man who values justice, humanism, and fraternity. He continued by saying that the Pope had raised awareness of the need for peace, united cultures, and awakened consciences.
- Egypt – President Abdel Fattah el-Sisi said Pope Francis "was a voice of peace, love and compassion".
- Equatorial Guinea – The Government of Equatorial Guinea expressed condolences over Pope Francis's death, with the Secretary General of the Episcopal Conference honoring his spiritual leadership and commitment to peace and human dignity.
- Eritrea – President Isaias Afwerki has expressed his sympathies to Vatican Secretary of State Pietro Parolin, praising the Pope as a man whose illustrious life was devoted to serving humanity and, in particular, advancing social justice for underrepresented groups in our global society.
- Eswatini – On behalf of King Mswati III, Queen Ntfombi Tfwala, as well as the government and citizens of Eswatini, Prime Minister Russell Dlamini expressed the nation's condolences, describing the event as a significant loss for the Catholic Church and good-willed people worldwide. He called the Pope as a symbol of harmony, compassion, and peace whose legacy will continue to inspire and lead future generations.
- Ethiopia – President Taye Atske Selassie offered his condolences, expressing his profound sadness at Pope Francis' passing. He paid tribute to the Pope's life of dedication to world peace, humanity, and faith. Prime Minister Abiy Ahmed wrote on Twitter, expressing his condolences, and for his wish for "his legacy of compassion, humility, and service to humanity continue to inspire generations to come".
- Gabon – President Brice Oligui Nguema expressed his condolences on social media. He emphasized that the Pope's teachings on faith, peace, and humility will continue to serve as an example for all people.
- Gambia – President Adama Barrow sent his condolences and described the Pope as a visionary leader who was fully committed to promoting peace, global understanding, and harmony.
- Ghana – President John Mahama stated that he had personally met Pope Francis and that leadership and legacy of compassion for others will continue to inspire generations.
- Guinea – Prime Minister Bah Oury honored Pope Francis' memory by saying that he is close to the underprivileged and those in need who died on the day of the global celebration of Jesus Christ's ascension into heaven. "A great voice and a great humanist conscience have been extinguished," he added.
- Guinea-Bissau – President Umaro Sissoco Embaló offered his sympathy and called the Pope a "worthy man." He emphasized that while we cannot claim that there will not be another Pope like Francis who is crucial for humanity, we can acknowledge that Pope Francis was a distinguished leader.
- Ivory Coast – President Alassane Ouattara called the Pope "a tireless artisan of peace and social justice", honoring "his dedication to the weakest members of society and his goal of creating a world in peace, more egalitarian and respectful of the environment".
- Kenya – President William Ruto described the Pope's death as a "big loss" to the Christian world, and praised his "unwavering commitment to inclusivity and justice".
- Lesotho – Prime Minister Sam Matekane expressed sorrow over the Pope's passing, calling him a genuine emissary of humanity and peace.
- Liberia – President Joseph Boakai expressed profound sorrow over Pope Francis's death, offering condolences to the Catholic Church, the Holy See, and Catholics worldwide on behalf of the Liberian government and people.
- Madagascar – President Andry Rajoelina commended Pope Francis' simplicity and wisdom, saying that it "will always remain in my mind and heart, especially the love that always guided his steps," and recalled the Pope's visit to Madagascar.
- Malawi – President Lazarus Chakwera has stated that he will honor the Pope for his bravery in promoting global governance reform. He went on to say that the Pope set an example for the Catholic Church by enacting bold changes like the encyclical Laudato si.
- Mauritania – On behalf of the Government of Mauritania, Minister of Islamic Affairs Sidi Yahya Ould Sheikhna Ould Al-Murabit expressed his condolences to Bishop Victor Ndione at the Roman Catholic Diocese of Nouakchott.
- Mauritius – Prime Minister Navin Ramgoolam expressed his condolences and praised the Pope's "humility, compassion, and dedication to the most disadvantaged". The Mauritian flag was flown at half-mast on all government buildings until the day of the funeral.
- Morocco – King Mohammed VI addressed a message of condolences to Cardinal Giovanni Battista Re, dean of the College of Cardinals, and recalled the Pope's visit to Morocco.
- Mozambique – President Daniel Chapo expressed his condolences saying, "May faith and hope comfort the bereaved hearts, and may the legacy of Pope Francis continue to enlighten our path."
- Namibia – President Netumbo Nandi-Ndaitwah said Pope Francis "shall be ingrained in our memories for his focused attention on the socioeconomic issues facing the developing world". She added that his death "reminds us about the need to redouble our efforts in favour of the most vulnerable to ensure a just and fairer humanity".
- Nigeria – President Bola Tinubu called on the world to honor his teachings and celebrate his legacy, calling Pope Francis a champion of the underprivileged and a beacon of hope for millions.
- Rwanda – President Paul Kagame expressed his condolences, praising the Pope as a world-renowned moral leader whose integrity and humility aided in mending the previously tense relationship between Rwanda and the Catholic Church.
- Sahrawi Arab Democratic Republic (Note: Also known as "Western Sahara". The Sahrawi Republic is a partially recognized state and is not officially recognized by the Holy See. See also International recognition of the Sahrawi Arab Democratic Republic.) – President Brahim Ghali sent a message of condolence to Cardinal Kevin Farrell, following the death of Pope Francis. He expressed sorrow and emotion alongside condolences to the deceased and to the Vatican as a whole.
- São Tomé and Príncipe – President Carlos Vila Nova wrote a letter of condolence to the Vatican, stating that Pope Francis is renowned for his warmth, his advocacy of simplicity, his involvement in social, environmental, and justice issues, his leadership in faith, and his invitation to be an entrepreneur of dreams rather than an administrator of fears. He went on to say that Francis was a reforming Pope and a universal symbol of humanism in support of the earth's underprivileged.
- Senegal – President Bassirou Diomaye Faye expressed his condolences, stating that the world lost a significant spiritual character. "The Pope embodied a living hope for millions of believers and people of good will through his commitment to the most vulnerable and his constant call for dialogue between peoples and religions," he continued.
- Seychelles – President Wavel Ramkalawan wrote that the Pope's passing has devastated Christianity as a whole. He described the Pope as a dedicated bishop and a remarkable spiritual leader who stood out as an unyielding advocate for human dignity by responding to the passionate global need for justice.
- Sierra Leone – President Julius Maada Bio expressed his condolences, stating that he was heartbroken. He urged those who had the honor of knowing the religious leader to "find comfort in our cherished memories of his leadership and compassion" and wished him "eternal peace."
- South Africa – President Cyril Ramaphosa said Pope Francis had "humility" and a profound commitment to "making the Church and the world a better place".
- South Sudan – President Salva Kiir called Pope Francis a "beacon of hope, compassion, and unity." He added that during the South Sudanese Civil War, Pope Francis' "act of kindness and humility demonstrated during our visit to Rome in 2019, when he knelt down to kiss our feet, was a turning point for us, the peace partners."
- Tanzania – President Samia Suluhu Hassan expressed her condolences, describing the Pope as a leader and educator who devoted his life to advancing world peace, human progress, and well-being.
- Togo – President Faure Gnassingbé praised Pope Francis's unwavering efforts to uphold human dignity and assist the weakest members of society, actions that will live on in their collective memory.
- Tunisia – On behalf of President Kais Saied, Foreign Minister Mohamed Ali Nafti traveled to Rome to offer condolences while attending the Pope's funeral. He also expressed Tunisia's solidarity with the Holy See's people and authorities in order to strengthen the world's foundations of security and stability.
- Uganda – The Government mourned Pope Francis's passing, recalling his 2015 visit as a moment of unity and spiritual renewal. Minister Chris Baryomunsi praised the Pope's commitment to peace and social justice, noting Uganda would be represented at his funeral.
- Zambia – President Hakainde Hichilema and his predecessor Edgar Lungu paid tribute to the Pope's legacy.
- Zimbabwe – President Emmerson Mnangagwa described the Pope as "a man of profound humility who stood for peace compassion and justice".

=== Americas ===
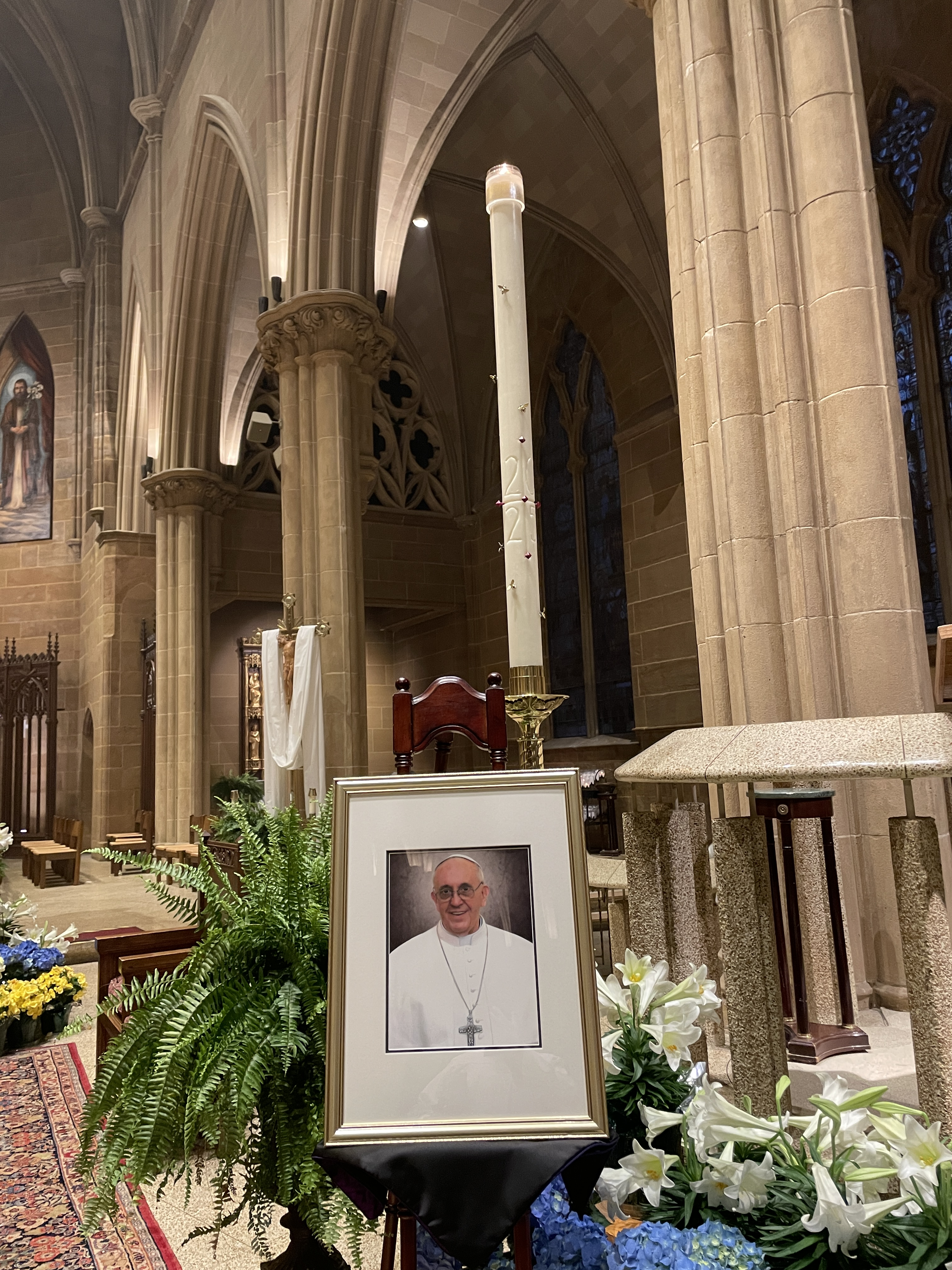
Memorial display for Pope Francis at St. Joseph Cathedral in Columbus, Ohio, United States

- Antigua and Barbuda – Prime Minister Gaston Browne wrote a condolence letter to Bishop Robert Llanos of St. John's-Basseterre, saying that the Pope's life was a witness to the strength of humility, mercy, and everlasting devotion to the Gospel of Christ. He also described how the Pope embodied the values of discernment, listening, and servant leadership while igniting a spirit of compassion and regeneration inside the Church and that his dedication to social justice, interfaith understanding, and environmental preservation had a significant and enduring influence.
- Argentina – President Javier Milei expressed his condolences. Former presidents Cristina Fernández de Kirchner, Mauricio Macri, and Alberto Fernández also sent their condolences and shared their personal anecdotes of him.
- Bahamas – Prime Minister Philip Davis expressed his condolences. He stated that his "life was marked by humility, courage, and a deep commitment to humanity".
- Barbados – Prime Minister Mia Mottley expressed her condolences, describing the Pope as "a beacon of global moral strategic leadership" and said that his writings gave her courage during some of Barbados' most difficult moments.
- Belize – An official statement by the government praised his "legacy of compassion, humility, and peace" and mentioned his 2024 meeting with Prime Minister John Briceño at the Vatican, celebrating decades of Church support in Belizean education, healthcare, and social services.
- Bolivia – President Luis Arce described Pope Francis as "not only the leader of the Catholic Church, but also a staunch friend of the Patria Grande and a fervent defender of the most vulnerable."
- Brazil – President Luiz Inácio Lula da Silva stated that Pope Francis "tirelessly sought to bring love where there was hate. Unity where there was discord. And the understanding that we are all equal, living in the same house, our planet, which urgently needs our care."
- Canada – Prime Minister Mark Carney described the Pope as "a voice of moral clarity, spiritual courage and boundless compassion" and as "the world's conscience" and highlighted an apology he made in 2022 to survivors of the Canadian Indian residential school system during his visit to Canada. In a separate statement, Governor General Mary Simon recalled attending his apology and added he spread "messages of peace, love and understanding throughout the world".
- Chile – President Gabriel Boric, wrote on his Twitter account that "Pope Francis, who made a genuine effort to bring the Church closer to people in a world where the spiritual seems to have taken a back seat, has died" and nodded to the values of "social justice" that Francis defended.
- Colombia – President Gustavo Petro described Pope Francis as a "great friend", and stated that he felt "somewhat alone" after Francis's death. He further underlined that the Pope was a champion of life and that he served as a spiritual leader.
- Costa Rica – The flags on the Presidential Palace were flown at half-mast to pay respect to Francis's death.
- Cuba – President and Communist Party First Secretary Miguel Díaz-Canel mourned the death of Pope Francis, thanked him for his "closeness" to the country and extended condolences to the international Catholic community and Francis' family. Díaz-Canel's predecessor Raúl Castro also paid tribute.
- Dominica – Prime Minister Roosevelt Skerrit praised Pope Francis as a man of peace and a true shepherd of the faith. "Let us honor his legacy of humility, compassion, and care for the weakest among us as we grieve his passing," he added.
- Dominican Republic – President Luis Abinader expressed the "deepest sorrow for the death of His Holiness" and added: "We join in the prayers of the Catholic Church and its faithful, as well as millions of people around the world who recognize his leadership, his legacy of peace, the promotion and defense of human rights and his noble service to those most in need. His memory will live on forever."
- Ecuador – President Daniel Noboa said, "Today the world has lost a spiritual leader who marked our era with his courage to do things differently, his simplicity, and his faith." He added, "From Ecuador, we join in prayer with the entire Church and the millions of faithful who today mourn the passing of Pope Francis."
- El Salvador – President Nayib Bukele expressed his sorrow over the Pope's passing and his condolences to Catholics both domestically and internationally. He said, "We offer our prayers for his eternal rest and for comfort for those who loved him and accompanied him in life."
- Grenada – Prime Minister Dickon Mitchell characterized Pope Francis as a servant leader who lived a life characterized by justice and compassion, speaking up for the underprivileged and disenfranchised. He went on to say that millions of people were moved by the Pope's leadership to view the world with compassion and love rather than with division.
- Guatemala – President Bernardo Arévalo said, "Thank you for everything, Pope Francis. May the Pope of mercy and simplicity rest in peace."
- Guyana – President Irfaan Ali described Pope Francis as "a shepherd of compassion and conscience", and expressed condolences on behalf of the government and people of Guyana. He praised the Pope's legacy of humility, advocacy for the environment, and commitment to social justice and interfaith dialogue.
- Haiti – The Transitional Presidential Council made a statement calling the Pope a revered spiritual leader and a fierce advocate for human dignity. It further stated that Pope Francis has been a voice of justice, compassion, and peace throughout his pontificate, calling to everyone's heart regardless of their beliefs. His dedication to the weakest members of society, his humility, and his confidence in mankind will live on in the collective memory.
- Honduras – President Xiomara Castro offered her condolences, highlighting that the Pope was a great spiritual leader who was sympathetic to the poor and a champion of justice, peace, migrants, and the preservation of their shared homeland.
- Jamaica – Prime Minister Andrew Holness expressed his condolences, stating that Pope Francis was a champion and advocate for change, using his position as pope to draw attention to causes such as climate change, equity, and fairness. He added that millions were drawn to his approach and a stronger faith in God because of his peaceful humility.
- Mexico – President Claudia Sheinbaum described Pope Francis as a "humanist who opted for the poor, peace and equality", while former president Enrique Peña Nieto (who oversaw Pope Francis's visit to Mexico in 2016) lamented his death, describing him as a "social leader of great relevancy".
- Nicaragua – Co-Presidents Daniel Ortega and Rosario Murillo expressed sorrow over Pope Francis's death, honoring him as the first pope from the Americas. In an official statement, they praised his message of peace and faith, despite past tensions with the Vatican, and offered prayers for his eternal rest.
- Panama – President José Raúl Mulino expressed his condolences and stated that "his time at the Vatican left a lasting impression and filled the hearts of people around the world with sympathy, appreciation, and recognition. Peace to his great soul."
- Paraguay – President Santiago Peña sent his condolences, saying that the Pope left behind a legacy of service and dedication to the most vulnerable ideals that would serve as a constant source of guidance.
- Peru – President Dina Boluarte offered her condolences through the verified account of the Presidential Office on Twitter and affirmed that the Pope was able to guide the Church's course with compassion, knowledge, and optimism.
- Saint Kitts and Nevis – Prime Minister Terrance Drew stated that Catholics in the Caribbean and Latin America, especially in Saint Kitts and Nevis, were filled with pride and hope after Pope Francis was elected as the first Latin American and Jesuit pope in more than a thousand years. He added that during Francis' pontificate, he relentlessly promoted interfaith harmony and dialogue, advocated for the poor, and demanded greater social justice.
- Saint Lucia – Prime Minister Philip J. Pierre described Pope Francis as a marginalized and impoverished advocate. He also stated that the Pope's message to us was one of tolerance and love in a society filled with sadness and perceived disparities.
- Saint Vincent and the Grenadines – Prime Minister Ralph Gonsalves stated that there is a lot of sorrow in the world. He characterized Pope Francis as a powerful advocate for world peace, a great moral leader, and someone who sought to improve the world.
- Suriname – President Chan Santokhi expressed his condolences, calling the Pope "a moral compass for the world community" and praising his unwavering pursuit of justice, peace, and human dignity.
- Trinidad and Tobago – Prime Minister Stuart Young described the Pope as a remarkable and modest leader who was well-known for advancing international diplomacy.
- United States – President Donald Trump wrote on Truth Social: "Rest in Peace Pope Francis! May God Bless him and all who loved him!" Later that same day, Trump announced he had signed an executive order that requested all federal and state flags to be flown at half-mast in honor of the pontiff. Former presidents Joe Biden, Barack Obama, and Bill Clinton also paid tribute. Biden, who met with the pope during his vice presidency and presidency, said that Francis "will be remembered as one of the most consequential leaders of our time," expressing a nod towards his decades-long humanitarian work in his native Argentina. Obama remembered the pope as a "rare leader who made us want to be better people". Clinton described him as "an extraordinary one". In a post on Twitter, Vice President JD Vance, who also met with the Pope on the day before his death, expressed his gratitude at seeing him "though he was obviously very ill", and expressed his sympathy with "the millions of Christians all over the world who loved him".
  - Puerto Rico – Governor Jenniffer González-Colón offered her condolences, saying that many people's perceptions of spiritual leadership were changed by Pope Francis' humility, sense of social justice, and ability to speak to the hearts of the people, especially the most marginalized and unfortunate.
  - U.S. Virgin Islands – On behalf of Governor Albert Bryan Jr., Director Richard Motta Jr. led the Government House press briefing on 22 April by expressing deeply felt condolences for the loss Pope Francis. "Pope Francis was a humble servant with a moral compass whose message of justice, compassion, and mercy resonated around the world," Motta added. "He had a special place in many hearts here in the Virgin Islands, where community and faith are essential to our way of life."
- Uruguay – President Yamandú Orsi expressed his condolences to the Catholic community and stated that "he departed perhaps at a time when the world needed him the most," leaving behind "a clear legacy and a path to follow", while former president José Mujica stated that "it is not just a neutral Pope who has passed away, it is the story of a religious man committed to his way of thinking and feeling."
- Venezuela – President Nicolás Maduro expressed his condolences, calling Pope Francis a "pastor of the world, brother of the South, and staunch defender of justice, peace, and the most humble." He underlined that the Pope came to prominence as a fearless voice that condemned the injustices of the international system and pushed for the development of a society that is more compassionate and encouraging.

=== Asia ===
- Armenia – President Vahagn Khachaturyan delivered a note of sorrow to Cardinal Giovanni Battista Re, stating that Pope Francis' passing is a profound loss for the Catholic world and all of Christendom, and that he would be remembered as a beacon of hope, compassion, and togetherness. He continued saying that the Pope's tireless efforts were focused on establishing world peace and solidarity as well as advancing universal ideals. Prime Minister Nikol Pashinyan expressed his profound sadness over Pope Francis's death and said his leadership in promoting a just and peaceful world will never be forgotten.
- Azerbaijan – President Ilham Aliyev was reported to have sent a letter to Cardinal Kevin Farrell of the Camerlengo of the Holy Roman Church, praising the Pope for his humanistic works and ideologies and expressing his remembrance for his meetings with him.
- Bahrain – The royal court mourned Pope Francis and expressed condolences on behalf of King Hamad bin Isa Al Khalifa.
- Bangladesh – The interim government expressed their condolences for Francis and said that Chief Adviser Muhammad Yunus worked together for their shared human rights values.
- Cambodia – Prime Minister Hun Manet extended his condolences and said that he would be remembered for "his compassion and great advocacy for peace, justice, and care for the vulnerable".
- China – The Ministry of Foreign Affairs expressed condolences over Francis's death, acknowledging ongoing constructive ties with the Vatican. While no details were given on funeral attendance, China affirmed its willingness to continue improving bilateral relations.
  - Hong Kong – Government officials, including former Chief Executives, attended a requiem Mass at the Cathedral of the Immaculate Conception on 28 April to mourn the passing of Pope Francis. Chief Executive John Lee Ka-chiu and Secretary for Home and Youth Affairs Alice Mak presented floral tributes outside the cathedral.
- Republic of China (Taiwan) (Note: Also known as "China". The ROC formerly ruled Mainland China and its territory was reduced to Taiwan and the smaller islands following the conclusion of the Chinese Civil War. As a result, the Holy See is one of only 12 governments that maintain diplomatic relations with the ROC rather than the People's Republic of China. See also Political status of Taiwan.) – President Lai Ching-te hailed the pope's "lifelong commitment to peace, global solidarity, and caring for those in need".
- Georgia – President Salome Zourabichvili said that her "thoughts are with the millions of Catholics mourning Pope Francis' passing on Easter Monday". Prime Minister Irakli Kobakhidze offered his condolences, adding that the Pope's legacy of harmony, compassion, and peace would endure.
- India – Prime Minister Narendra Modi said he is "deeply pained" by the death of Pope Francis. 3 days of official mourning were declared and all flags at government and public buildings and spaces were ordered to fly at half mast in respect for the late pontiff.
- Indonesia – President Prabowo Subianto expressed his sorrow at the Pope's death, stating that the world has lost a leader who was deeply devoted to humanity, peace, and fraternity. He recalled how Pope Francis' visit to Indonesia in 2024 profoundly affected not only Catholics, but all Indonesians. He continued by praising the principles that the Pope has continuously upheld while in office, such as humility, compassion for the underprivileged, and his interest in interfaith and international fraternity. Former presidents Joko Widodo and Megawati Sukarnoputri also offered their condolences on the Pope's death.
- Iran – President Masoud Pezeshkian said Francis "dedicated his life to spreading the teachings of Christ and made effective and lasting efforts in this direction", and highlighted his role in condemning the Israeli invasion of the Gaza Strip. The Ministry of Foreign Affairs expressed its condolences "to all Christians around the world".
- Iraq – Mohammed Shia' Al Sudani said Francis would be remembered for "serving humanity, fostering unity among peoples, and upholding peace and the highest moral and social values".
- Israel – President Isaac Herzog hailed Francis's "boundless compassion". The Israeli government posted a message on Twitter: "Rest in Peace, Pope Francis. May his memory be a blessing", with an image of the pope visiting the Western Wall in Jerusalem; this post was retweeted by Israeli embassies around the world, but was later deleted by order of the Ministry of Foreign Affairs due to the Pope's position against the Gaza war. Israel later ordered the removal of other official posts expressing condolences to Francis, and also ordered Israeli ambassadors not to sign condolence books at Vatican embassies, which has caused outrage, with some calling it offensive to Catholics. Prime Minister Benjamin Netanyahu belatedly expressed condolences on 25 April, four days after the pontiff's death. The BBC characterized his message as "muted" and "somewhat [impersonal]".
- Japan – Emperor Naruhito and Empress Masako sent Koro Bessho, the grand chamberlain to the Imperial pair, to the Apostolic Nunciature to Japan in Tokyo, to offer their condolences. Prime Minister Shigeru Ishiba expressed his sadness and respect for Francis. He added that the Pope's passing is a significant loss for the people of the Vatican and Catholics, as well as the entire society.
- Jordan – King Abdullah II expressed his sincere sympathies to Christians worldwide, calling the Pope the "Pope of the People," who led with compassion, humility, and gentleness.
- Kazakhstan – President Kassym-Jomart Tokayev stated that Pope Francis was a remarkable spiritual leader who worked tirelessly to further the admirable principles of justice, compassion, and humanism. He referred to the 2022 apostolic visit of the Pope to Kazakhstan, which served as a potent symbol of understanding and tolerance.
- Kuwait – Emir Sheikh Mishal Al-Ahmad Al-Jaber Al-Sabah sent Cardinal Giovanni Battista Re a cable expressing his sympathies. Throughout his lifetime, he became a symbol of religious tolerance, bringing people together, and forgiveness. He also commended the Pope's enormous contributions, particularly his brave positions that promoted peace and harmony.
- Kyrgyzstan – President Sadyr Japarov sent Cardinal Kevin Farrell a telegram expressing his condolences. He added that Pope Francis has played a major role in advancing humanism, tolerance, mercy, forgiveness, and understanding between nations.
- Lebanon – President Joseph Aoun mourned the loss of a "dear friend" of Lebanon and expressed condolences to the Holy See. Prime Minister Nawaf Salam also characterized the pope as "a solid supporter" of Lebanon.
- Malaysia – Prime Minister Anwar Ibrahim expressed his condolences while lauding the Pope's lasting legacy as a moral compass of justice, humility, and compassion in a turbulent world. He went on to say that the Pope's dedication to environmental conservation, interfaith understanding, and the dignity of the marginalized went well beyond what the Catholic Church could provide.
- Mongolia – President Ukhnaagiin Khürelsükh expressed his condolences, remembering the visit of Pope Francis in Mongolia in 2023 as an "event of exceptional importance that will be etched forever in golden letters in the history". Prime Minister Oyun-Erdene Luvsannamsrai said that Francis "was a close and cherished friend of the Mongolian people" and "his visit marked a historic milestone—the first-ever papal journey to Mongolia (...) 777 years after the envoy Giovanni da Pian del Carpine delivered a message from Pope Innocent IV to the Mongolian Empire".
- Myanmar – State Administration Council Chairman Min Aung Hlaing offered his condolences and stated that the Pope "will be held in high esteem for his service and dedication [to] the Lord as well as his contribution to […] world peace."
- Nepal – Prime Minister K. P. Sharma Oli described Pope Francis as a global symbol of peace, compassion, and justice, whose papacy touched lives across the world. He extended heartfelt condolences on behalf of Nepal to the global Catholic community, noting that the Pope's legacy would be remembered for his unwavering commitment to harmony, humility, and the service of humanity.
- Oman – Sultan Haitham bin Tariq sent a cable to Cardinal Kevin Farrell expressing his condolences to the Vatican's residents and Christians worldwide.
- Pakistan – President Asif Ali Zardari said that Pope Francis would be remembered for his efforts in promoting peace, social justice, inter-faith dialogue, and the well-being of the most vulnerable communities worldwide. Prime Minister Shehbaz Sharif described him as a strong advocate of harmony and peace.
- Palestine – President Mahmoud Abbas said that Pope Francis was a faithful friend of the Palestinians who championed their rights.
- Philippines – President Bongbong Marcos said that the Philippines joins the international Catholic community in grieving the loss of Pope Francis. The president said that Pope Francis was "A man of profound faith and humility, Pope Francis led not only with wisdom but with a heart open to all, especially the poor and the forgotten" and described him as the "best pope in my lifetime."
- Qatar – Emir Sheikh Tamim bin Hamad Al Thani expressed condolences in a cable to Cardinal Kevin Farrell, the Camerlengo of the Holy Roman Church.
- Saudi Arabia – King Salman and Crown Prince Mohammed bin Salman conveyed their condolences.
- Singapore – President Tharman Shanmugaratnam described Pope Francis as having "unwavering compassion, humility, and dedication to humanity", whose messages resonated with Singapore's multifaith community. Prime Minister Lawrence Wong said that Pope Francis' compassion and leadership have impacted countless lives, given people hope, and bolstered efforts to promote unity and harmony among all religions. He offered his condolences to the Catholic community in Singapore and around the world.
- South Korea – Acting President and Prime Minister Han Duck-soo sent a message of condolences to Vatican Secretary of State Pietro Parolin, saying, "The government and people of the Republic of Korea share in the sorrow of Catholics around the world and convey their heartfelt condolences." He also mentioned the relationship between the Pope and South Korea, including the Pope's visit to the country in 2014.
- Sri Lanka – President Anura Kumara Dissanayake honored Pope Francis' legacy of justice, compassion, and interfaith harmony. He stated that the world would never be the same because of the Pope's unwavering dedication to humanity, compassion, and peace. The country declared 26 April 2025 a national day of mourning.
- Syria – President Ahmed al-Sharaa praised Pope Francis, stating that he stood with the Syrian people during their most difficult times and never stopped speaking out against the injustice and violence they had to deal with. "His calls transcended political boundaries, and his legacy of moral courage and solidarity will live on in the hearts of many in our homeland," he added.
- Tajikistan – President Emomali Rahmon sent a telegraph of condolences to Cardinal Giovanni Battista Re, stating that the Pope's innovative acts and initiatives brought him international renown and made a significant contribution to world events. He continued by saying that he acknowledges and values the Pope's deserving contributions to fostering intercultural communication and the full application of the values of tolerance, peace, and harmony in all spheres of life.
- Thailand – King Vajiralongkorn delivered a condolence message to the Vatican, expressing that both he and Queen Suthida were devastated by the Pope's death. Prime Minister Paetongtarn Shinawatra stated in a message that millions of people from all walks of life were inspired by the Pope's unfailing compassion, moral courage, noble humility, and relentless quest of peace.
- Timor-Leste – President José Ramos-Horta described the pope's death as "a global loss" and announced that the country's flags would be flown at half-mast. Prime Minister Xanana Gusmão extended his “deepest condolences to the College of Cardinals, the Catholic Church and all its faithful, as well as to all those who, even if not Catholic, feel this immense loss of our beloved Grandfather, who has gone to his eternal life to rest in peace”.
- Turkey – President Recep Tayyip Erdoğan expressed condolences on social media, describing the pope as "a respected statesman" and "a spiritual leader who gave importance to dialogue between different faith groups and took the initiative in the face of human tragedies, especially the Palestinian issue and the genocide in Gaza."
- Turkmenistan – President Serdar Berdimuhamedow expressed his condolences to Cardinal Kevin Farrell, saying that every nation will always remember Pope Francis' tremendous efforts to forge amicable religious ties and advance international peace, harmony, and togetherness.
- United Arab Emirates – President Sheikh Mohamed bin Zayed Al Nahyan expressed his condolences, adding that the Pope had devoted his life "to promoting the principles of peaceful coexistence and understanding". Vice President and Prime Minister Sheikh Mohammed bin Rashid Al Maktoum said that the Pope's "legacy of humility and interfaith unity will continue to inspire many communities around the world".
- Uzbekistan – President Shavkat Mirziyoyev sent his condolences to Cardinal Kevin Farrell, the Camerlengo of the Holy Roman Church, as well as to the Vatican and Catholics worldwide. He stated, "His Holiness made a worthy contribution to strengthening cooperation between Uzbekistan and the Vatican, promoting interfaith friendship, supporting the needy around the world and spreading the values of kindness and compassion."
- Vietnam – President Lương Cường sent a condolence letter to Cardinal Kevin Farrell. Prime Minister Phạm Minh Chính and Deputy Prime Minister Bùi Thanh Sơn sent their condolences to Cardinal Pietro Parolin and Paul R. Gallagher.
- Yemen – President Rashad al-Alimi offered condolences on Pope Francis's death, praising him as a global symbol of tolerance, coexistence, and peace. He highlighted the Pope's support for humanitarian causes and his message of hope to the Yemeni people.

=== Europe ===
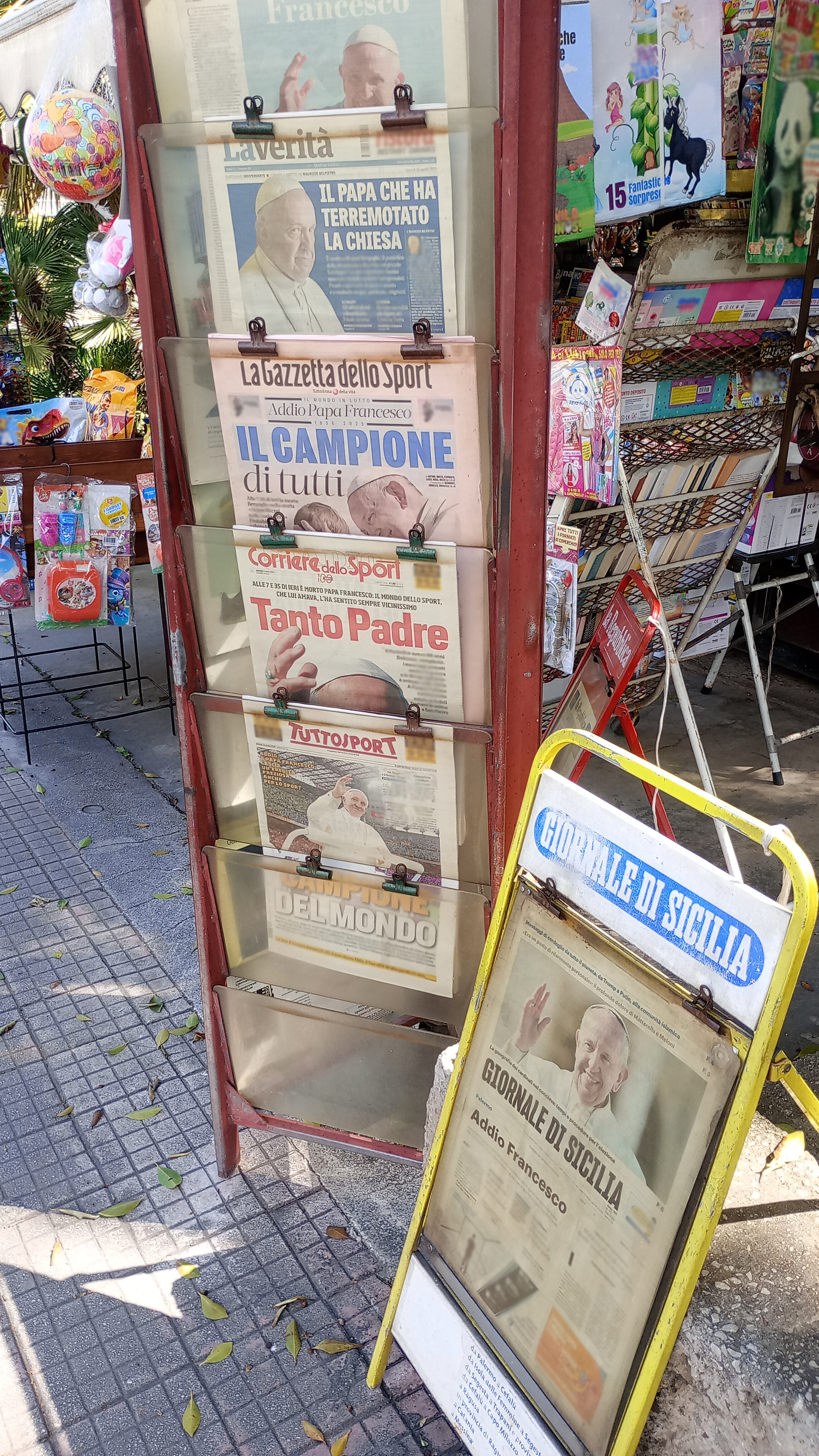
Newspapers in Bagheria, Sicily, on 22 April 2025, reporting the death of Pope Francis

- Albania – President Bajram Begaj said the Pope left behind a legacy of "compassion, love and devotion to every person, every believer of every religion". Prime Minister Edi Rama sent his condolences and described the Pope as "an unforgettable friend of Albania."
- Andorra – Episcopal Co-Prince and Bishop of Urgell Joan Enric Vives i Sicília stressed that the memory of Pope Francis "will last for his service to the migrants and the poor" and "for the exemplarity of his life as a bishop of Rome". Prime Minister Xavier Espot posted his condolences writing that "he will have been a very important pope for the Catholic Church, an example of goodness and fully involved in the great challenges of our world, such as climate change and the fight against inequality" and asked that "his legacy will last in time".
- Austria – President Alexander Van der Bellen hailed the Pope as a "guide of hope" and an "inspiration for millions of believers and far beyond". Francis, he continued, was "very close to the people" and a "Pope for social justice." Chancellor Christian Stocker described the event as "a painful loss for the Catholic Church and for many people around the globe."
- Belarus – President Alexander Lukashenko wrote in his condolence statement to Cardinal Kevin Farrell that "love for the flock, for all people and for the whole world" characterized Francis's service. He added: "As a true humanist and defender of the interests of the common man, the Pope has made an invaluable contribution to ensuring social equality and justice. The Pope's work has become a testimony to his deep faith, wisdom and humanism."
- Belgium – King Philippe and Queen Mathilde expressed their gratitude for the honor the Pope had shown them by coming to their nation and said they shared the sorrow of all Catholics worldwide as well as that of everyone who loved and valued him. Prime Minister Bart De Wever honored the Pope on Twitter with the Latin phrase "Requiem aeternam dona ei, Domine, et lux perpetua luceat ei."
- Bosnia and Herzegovina – The three members of the Presidency of Bosnia and Herzegovina issued separate messages of condolences, and the country declared 26 April 2025, a Day of Mourning in his honor.
- Bulgaria – President Rumen Radev said that Pope Francis "dedicated his ministry to peace, understanding and unity among peoples". Prime Minister Rosen Zhelyazkov wrote that Pope Francis was a genuine friend of Bulgaria and will always be a representation of harmony, compassion, and peace.
- Croatia – President Zoran Milanović said that "[i]n today's world full of problems and challenges, Pope Francis was needed as a voice of reason and peace". Prime Minister Andrej Plenković, who was the last foreign political official to meet with Francis before his death, stated that his "life and spiritual path left an indelible mark on the modern world."
- Cyprus – President Nikos Christodoulides stated that the Pope supported efforts of cooperation among different nations and religions, thus making him a "steadfast champion of peace and coexistence among peoples and cultures."
- Czech Republic – President Petr Pavel said that Francis "was above all a representative of humanity in the contemporary world", who left behind "an inspiring legacy that will continue to endure." Prime Minister Petr Fiala expressed his condolences, stating that the Pope was a devout man who worked to change the Church to better fulfill its role in modern society.
- Denmark – King Frederik X and Queen Mary expressed their condolences, describing the Pope as being dedicated to promoting peace, justice, and always advocating for people living in vulnerable situations. Prime Minister Mette Frederiksen described the Pope as "a dedicated advocate for peace and justice," stating that he will be remembered for his tireless work to help the world's poorest.
- Estonia – President Alar Karis sent his condolences, calling the Pope a modest, moral leader whose appeal for justice, compassion, and togetherness reached much beyond the Catholic Church.
- Finland – President Alexander Stubb said Pope Francis "will be remembered for his work among the poor and as a defender of the socially disadvantaged". Prime Minister Petteri Orpo also expressed condolences.
- France – President Emmanuel Macron (Note: Also co-prince of Andorra) paid tribute to Pope Francis, calling him a "man of humility, on the side of the most vulnerable and most fragile". On Twitter, he commented on the Pope's impact on the church, saying "From Buenos Aires to Rome, Pope Francis wanted the Church to bring joy and hope to the poorest. For it to unite humans among themselves, and with nature. May this hope forever outlast him." Prime Minister François Bayrou commended the Pope's "historic" attitude, describing him as a leader who has precipitated a "shift within the Church."
- Germany – President Frank-Walter Steinmeier described the pope as a "shining sign of hope" and a "man of peace". Chancellor Olaf Scholz expressed his condolences at the loss of "an advocate for the weak, a reconciler, and a warm-hearted person" in a post on Twitter. Chancellor-designate Friedrich Merz paid tribute to Francis's "tireless commitment to the weakest in society, to justice and reconciliation".
- Greece – President Konstantinos Tasoulas called the Pope a "transformative religious leader" whose legacy "will continue to inspire during difficult times." Prime Minister Kyriakos Mitsotakis posted his condolences for Francis and people who share values of peace and solidarity.
- Hungary – President Tamás Sulyok said that Pope Francis "spoke in the language of the people, so that everyone could understand him". Prime Minister Viktor Orbán thanked Pope Francis in a post on Facebook bidding him farewell.
- Iceland – President Halla Tómasdóttir paid tribute to the Pope, describing him as "an important leader" whose influence should endure in world leadership.
- Ireland – President Michael D. Higgins paid tribute to the Pope in an official statement. Taoiseach Micheál Martin wrote on social media that "Pope Francis's legacy is his message of peace, reconciliation, and solidarity that lives in the hearts of those he inspired."
- Italy – President Sergio Mattarella said that the death of the Pope aroused "pain and emotion among Italians and throughout the world." Prime Minister Giorgia Meloni described the Pope as "a great man, a great shepherd" and expressed her sorrow.
- Kosovo (Note: The Republic of Kosovo is a partially recognized state and is not officially recognized by the Holy See. See also International recognition of Kosovo.) – President Vjosa Osmani described Pope Francis as "a voice of compassion, humility, and justice in our time." Albin Kurti, acting Prime Minister of Kosovo, expressed condolences and added the pope's legacy would "live on forever."
- Latvia – President Edgars Rinkēvičs offered his condolences and emphasized the Pope's significance to the community at large as well as to believers.
- Liechtenstein – The flag on Vaduz Castle and the government building were flown at half-mast to pay respect to Francis's death.
- Lithuania – President Gitanas Nausėda sent his condolences, calling the event a moment of great loss. He underlined that the Pope has left behind a father who cared for all of mankind as a single, large family, a wise and intimate friend, an inspirational teacher, and an example of honorable and joyous service. Prime Minister Gintautas Paluckas mourned Pope Francis’s death, calling it a great loss for Lithuania and the global Church. He praised the Pope’s compassion and recalled his 2018 visit as a deeply spiritual and unifying moment for the nation.
- Luxembourg – Grand Duke Henri stated that the Pope was "a man of great compassion, sharing the pain and suffering of others" who served as a spiritual mentor beyond the Church. Prime Minister Luc Frieden offered his sympathies and said the Pope contributed "to enriching our debates on ethical, societal, and environmental issues", adding that society "cannot survive without values and principles".
- Malta – Prime Minister Robert Abela expressed his condolences on behalf of the Maltese government, stating that the Pope's "visit to [Malta] remains deeply cherished" and that Pope Francis's "pontificate was defined by tireless efforts for peace, a strong voice for the vulnerable [and] significant reforms in the Catholic Church."
- Moldova – President Maia Sandu paid tribute to Pope Francis, saying "Pope Francis has dedicated his life to the values of humanity, hope, and solidarity".
- Monaco – Prince Albert II expressed condolences on behalf of the Monegasque princely family and people, paying tribute to "a very great servant of humanity".
- Montenegro – President Jakov Milatović described Pope Francis as "a spiritual leader who inspired the hearts of believers around the world".
- Netherlands – King Willem-Alexander and Queen Máxima described Pope Francis as "the embodiment of benevolence and humanity", while recalling their state visit to the Holy See in 2017. Prime Minister Dick Schoof said "Pope Francis was in every way a man of the people".
- North Macedonia – President Gordana Siljanovska-Davkova wrote: "I will remember Pope Francis for his exceptional mind, wisdom, warmth and simplicity". Parliament Speaker Afrim Gashi mourned the death of Pope Francis, calling it a great loss for humanity. He praised the Pope's legacy of peace, justice, and interfaith dialogue, saying it will inspire future generations toward unity and compassion.
- Norway – King Harald V said Pope Francis was "highly respected and loved for being a passionate and clear voice for the most vulnerable in society." Prime Minister Jonas Gahr Støre described the pope as "an important and clear voice for social justice and human dignity", who "challenged both politicians and society to take greater responsibility for the most vulnerable and built bridges in a world marked by division".
- Poland – President Andrzej Duda said Pope Francis was "guided by humility and modesty", while Prime Minister Donald Tusk remembered him as a "good, warm and sensitive man".
- Portugal – President Marcelo Rebelo de Sousa hailed Pope Francis's courage for the "defense of human dignity". Prime Minister Luís Montenegro called Francis "an extraordinary Pope who leaves a unique legacy of humanism, empathy, compassion and closeness to people".
- Romania – Acting President Ilie Bolojan described the pope as a "symbol of humility, compassion and tireless commitment to peace and justice", adding that he was also a friend to Romanians. Prime Minister Marcel Ciolacu said "Pope Francis remains a tireless advocate for peace for people everywhere".
- Russia – President Vladimir Putin expressed his condolences to the Vatican, saying Pope Francis "actively promoted the development of dialogue between the Russian Orthodox and Roman Catholic Churches, as well as constructive cooperation between Russia and the Holy See".
- San Marino – Captains Regents Denise Bronzetti and Italo Righi issued an official message expressing "feelings of emotion and deep participation in the mourning" highlighting the Pope as a "unanimously recognised figure who marked an epoch". State Secretary Luca Beccari wrote "through his life and pontificate, the Holy Father has left an indelible mark on the history of the Catholic Church and all of humanity, distinguishing himself for his tireless commitment to peace, social justice, the dignity of the weakest and dialogue between peoples and religions".
- Serbia – President Aleksandar Vučić expressed his "deep sorrow" at the Pope's death, writing on social media: "The world has lost an exceptional spiritual leader who, through his apostolic mission, spread love, peace, and solidarity."
- Slovakia – President Peter Pellegrini said, "We've been left without a man who charmed everyone with his humanity, modesty, and wisdom." He added that the Pope was the epitome of humanity and humility, a fervent supporter of peace, and a foe of all evil. Prime Minister Robert Fico said of the Pope, "He was a great spiritual man of love. He was a humble man of dialogue, peace and tranquility. He was a tireless man of truth who courageously broke down divisions and built bridges of unification." Interior minister Matúš Šutaj Eštok announced that the flag of Slovakia will be flown at half-mast between Tuesday, 22 April 2025, 8 am (CEST) until Thursday, 24 April 2025, 5 pm (CEST).
- Slovenia – President Nataša Pirc Musar expressed her condolences, stating that the world had lost a remarkable spiritual leader who had shaped our era with his compassion, simplicity, and unwavering pursuit of justice, peace, and human dignity. Prime Minister Robert Golob said that the Pope "said goodbye to us in extremely difficult times, which are not honorable to us as humanity. The wars that Francis sincerely wanted to end, and the divisions between nations that he tried to pacify, all of his work gave us hope and faith that we will be able to do it and that good and peace will prevail".
- Spain – King Felipe VI and the royal family expressed their deep sadness, with a statement by the Royal House saying that Pope Francis "testified throughout his pontificate to the importance of love of neighbour, fraternity and social friendship for the world of our century". Prime Minister Pedro Sánchez hailed Pope Francis's commitment to the "most vulnerable".
- Sweden – King Carl XVI Gustaf paid tribute to Pope Francis. He said that "By virtue of his natural charisma, deep humility, and unwavering defense of human dignity, the Pope was a significant leader". Prime Minister Ulf Kristersson also expressed condolences.
- Switzerland – President Karin Keller-Sutter said Pope Francis was a "great spiritual leader, a tireless advocate for peace".
- Ukraine – President Volodymyr Zelenskyy paid tribute to Pope Francis. He said that "He knew how to give hope, ease suffering through prayer, and foster unity."
- United Kingdom – King Charles III (Note: The British monarch also serves as Supreme Governor of the Church of England, as well as the monarch and head of state of the other Commonwealth realms and Head of the Commonwealth.) said he and Queen Camilla had "heavy hearts" and paid tribute to Francis's "compassion" and "tireless commitment" to people of faith. Prime Minister Keir Starmer praised him as "a Pope for the poor, the downtrodden and the forgotten." Former Prime Minister Tony Blair, who converted to the Catholic Church after leaving office in 2007, described Francis as "an extraordinary and devoted servant of the Catholic Church, admired both within and beyond it for his humility, compassion and unwavering commitment to the Christian faith and the service of all humanity – Christian and non-Christian alike". Former Prime Minister Gordon Brown also saluted the pope's "unselfish life of service and moral leadership". The Union Flag was flown at half-mast on royal residences and government buildings as a sign of respect.
  - Gibraltar – Chief Minister Fabian Picardo expressed condolences to Cardinal Pietro Parolin, describing Francis's death as "a sad day for the Catholic community in Gibraltar and around the world but for the world as a whole."
  - Jersey – Sir Timothy Le Cocq, Bailiff of Jersey, said the Pope's "selfless devotion to his faith and to all of those of good intent made him a much loved and respected figure".
  - Northern Ireland – First Minister Michelle O'Neill said that Catholics "right across the world, including here in Ireland, will feel his loss deeply," while deputy First Minister Emma Little-Pengelly also paid respects in a statement.
  - Scotland – First Minister John Swinney described Francis as "a voice for peace, tolerance and reconciliation".
  - Wales – First Minister Eluned Morgan expressed her "deepest condolences to the Catholic community in Wales and around the world".

=== Oceania ===
- American Samoa – Governor Pula Nikolao Pula characterized the Pope as a global spiritual leader who lived a life of faith, compassion, and service to humanity.
- Australia – Prime Minister Anthony Albanese described Pope Francis as "a devoted champion and loving father" to all Catholics, and added that his death would by mourned by Australians of all faiths. The national flag was flown at half-mast on federal government buildings. Governor-General Sam Mostyn also paid tribute to the pope in an official statement.
- Fiji – Prime Minister Sitiveni Rabuka sent his own and the nation's condolences, stating that Fiji is in solidarity with people throughout during this time of grief.He added that generations both inside and beyond the Catholic Church will be inspired by the late pope's legacy of faith, compassion, and service.
- Guam – Governor Lou Leon Guerrero and her deputy Josh Tenorio issued a joint statement saying that Francis's legacy would "continue to shape the way we lead, live, and connect with each other".
- Kiribati – The Government of Kiribati has extended its condolences to Bishop Simon Mani, the head of the Catholic Church for the Diocese of Tarawa and Nauru, as well as to priests, nuns, catechists, and other members of the nation's Catholic community who have been profoundly impacted by the Pope's passing. President Taneti Maamau announced 25 April as a public holiday to honor the late pontiff.
- Federated States of Micronesia – The Government of the Federated States of Micronesia offered its condolences, saying Pope Francis had a tremendous impact on people of all religions who were struck by his compassion, humility, and togetherness. It further stated that the Pope was not only a religious figure but also a moral force of our day because of his bravery in speaking the truth, standing up for the weak, and promoting peace.
- Nauru – President David Adeang expressed his condolences, stating that Pope Francis was a great shepherd of compassion, humility, and peace. He added that the Pope's unwavering call for unity, kindness, and hope, his fearless voice for justice and equality, and his relentless support of the weak and impoverished inspired the entire world.
- New Zealand – Prime Minister Christopher Luxon described Pope Francis as a "man of humility" with a legacy of "unwavering commitment to the vulnerable, to social justice and to interfaith dialogue".
  - Cook Islands – Prime Minister Mark Brown described the Pope as "a man of deep humility and unwavering faith".
- Northern Mariana Islands – Governor Arnold Palacios said the pope's leadership "ushered a culture of compassion and moral courage".
- Papua New Guinea – Prime Minister James Marape hailed Pope Francis as "a spiritual father to over a billion Catholics around the world and a moral voice of conscience in times of global uncertainty".
- Solomon Islands – Prime Minister Jeremiah Manele sent a message of condolence to Monsignor Mauro Lalli, non-resident Ambassador-Designate of the Apostolic Nunciature to the Solomon Islands, stating that the Pope's work to support the weak and disenfranchised, along with his teachings of love, hope, and the moral need to address global issues like climate change, are still relevant and powerful. He continued that the Pope's lifetime commitment to the Church and to the principles of justice, compassion, and unity is recognized by the Solomon Islands' government.
- Tonga – In a media briefing on 24 April, the Cabinet of Tonga announced an homage to Pope Francis, demonstrating the nation's profound respect for the late pontiff. A government official stated, "The loss of Pope Francis is profound not only for Catholics but for everyone who valued his message of peace and unity. Tonga pays our respects in solidarity with the rest of the world." The nation stated that on 26 April, it would observe toumoloto 'o e fuka', a traditional practice of lowering flags to half-mast, in honor of the Pope.
- Vanuatu – Prime Minister Jotham Napat offered his condolences, calling Pope Francis a man of deep faith, humility, and compassion who was totally committed to the Church and its role in global affairs. He continued by stating that the Pope was deeply involved in promoting the rights of underprivileged and marginalized peoples worldwide and that his teachings on issues such as peace, climate change, and conserving for future generations speak for themselves.

== International organizations ==
- African Union – Chairperson of the African Union Commission Mahamoud Ali Youssouf paid tribute to the Pope's "courageous engagement" in Africa.
- Arab League – Secretary-General of the Arab League Ahmed Aboul Gheit expressed sorrow over the death of Pope Francis, saying that the Pope was "a unique voice for humanity and conscience," particularly at a time when such values are increasingly under threat.
- Bureau International des Expositions – The Polish pavilion at Expo 2025 had posted condolences to the Vatican pavilion on behalf of participating pavilions and the BIE.
- Commonwealth of Nations – Commonwealth Secretary-General Shirley Ayorkor Botchwey paid tribute in a statement.
- European Union – President of the European Commission Ursula von der Leyen said the Pope "inspired millions, far beyond the Catholic Church, with his humility and love so pure for the less fortunate." President of the European Parliament Roberta Metsola said "his contagious smile captured millions of people's hearts across the globe".
- FIFA – President of FIFA Gianni Infantino was "deeply saddened" over the Pope's death and said the Pope shared his enthusiasm for football and stressed the important role the sport plays in society.
- International Olympic Committee – President Thomas Bach praised Francis's "constant encouragement of the Olympic Games and our mission to build a better world through sport", and highlighted his policy in support of refugees, which he said inspired him to create the Refugee Olympic Team for the 2016 Summer Olympics.
- The International Organization for Migration released a statement paying tribute to Pope Francis's policy towards migrants and refugees.
- NATO – Secretary General of NATO Mark Rutte offered condolences to the Catholic community and all who were moved by his humanity, describing Pope Francis’ dedication to peace and compassion as an inspiration to millions.
- Pacific Islands Forum – Chair ʻAisake Eke (Note: Also the Prime Minister of Tonga.) and Secretary General Baron Waqa jointly released a statement in which they said Pope Francis promoted the rights and dignity of all people, urged for the protection of our planet, and stood as a worldwide spiritual leader alongside the most vulnerable. They added that in the Pacific, where the effects of climate change and environmental degradation are a lived reality, the pontiff's words of peace and ecological justice struck a deep chord.
- United Nations – Secretary-General of the United Nations António Guterres said the Pope left behind "a legacy of faith, service and compassion for all — especially those left on the margins of life or trapped by the horrors of conflict." Filippo Grandi, the United Nations High Commissioner for Refugees, said that the Pope "stood up and spoke out — relentlessly — for the poor, the persecuted, the victims of war, the refugees, the migrants."

== Religious leaders ==
=== Christian ===
==== Catholic ====
- The Chinese Catholic Patriotic Association placed a brief statement of condolence on their website, then removed it four days later, leaving no acknowledgement of his death. No bishop from China attended his funeral.
- The Conference of Catholic Bishops of Cuba expressed condolences and called on Cubans to gather in prayer.
- The Catholic Bishops' Conference of England and Wales president Cardinal Vincent Nichols spoke of the Pope's death bringing "great sadness to so many around the world, both within the Catholic Church and in societies in general."
- The Bishops' Conference of France outgoing president Éric de Moulins-Beaufort said "The fruits of this pontificate will be revealed in the years to come. He has certainly left his mark on the Church’s pastoral practice through his simple, encouraging style, his constant reference to God’s mercy, his desire for the sacraments to be accessible to all who ask for them, and his persevering reminder of the cross of Christ Jesus, without which the Church would be just another NGO."
- German Bishops' Conference president Georg Bätzing called his death the loss of a great pope, a prudent shepherd and a courageous renewer of the Church's mission.
- Episcopal Conference of Argentina, in a statement, expressed its condolences on the passing of Pope Francis, highlighting his leadership as an "untiring shepherd" who guided the Church with humility, closeness to the poor, and a deep commitment to mercy and social justice. The document was signed by the Executive Commission of the Argentine Episcopal Conference, including Marcelo Daniel Colombo, Ángel Sixto Rossi, César Daniel Fernández and Raúl Pizarro.
- Episcopal Conference of Brazil said in a statement that it was praying and added that Francis “led the Church with evangelical wisdom, compassion, and missionary spirit". The document was signed by Jaime Spengler, Ricardo Hoepers, Paulo Jackson Nóbrega de Sousa, and João Justino de Medeiros Silva.
- Episcopal Conference of Italy president Matteo Zuppi called his death a greatly painful moment for the church and called for churches in his country to ring their bells and start prayers in his honor.
- The Jesuit Superior General, Fr. Arturo Sosa SJ expressed a "grateful memory" of the first Jesuit pope, and that "his approach to people and the situation in each context in which he lived is only grasped in its depth from the recognition of his spiritual experience."
- The Catholic Bishops' Conference of Korea issued a statement signed by its president, Bishop Mathias Ri Iong-hoon, highlighting Francis's relationship with the Catholic Church in Korea.
- Sovereign Military Order of Malta Prince and Grand Master John T. Dunlap expressed his condolences, noting the Pope's "witness of faith, his dedication to the weakest, his incessant appeal for mercy and peace have deeply marked our times and will continue to illuminate the path of the Church."
- The New Zealand Catholic Bishops' Conference president Bishop Stephen Lowe said "While he didn’t set foot on our shores, we know the deep love that Pope Francis had for the Catholic faithful scattered across the world."
- The Archbishop of New York, Cardinal Timothy M. Dolan, stated: "How appropriate that his last public appearance was on Easter Sunday, as we celebrated the joy of the resurrection of Jesus whom Pope Francis loved so deeply and so well, and right after our Jewish brothers and sisters, for whom Pope Francis had such great love, concluded their celebration of Passover."
- Catholic Bishops' Conference of the Philippines president Cardinal Pablo Virgilio David stated his shock and called for churches to ring their bells to honor him.
- Polish Bishops' Conference president, Archbishop Tadeusz Wojda SAC, called for prayers for the late Pope, describing him as "a man of peace and reconciliation, and a pilgrim of hope." The Primate of Poland, Archbishop Wojciech Polak, stated that Francis's pontificate was "a great pontificate of hope" and "a Church that is called to go out to the people."
- Episcopal Conference of Slovenia president Bishop Andrej Saje said that "with Francis' departure to the Father, we have lost not only the supreme leader of the Catholic Church and the Vicar of Christ on earth, but also a man of deep compassion, who, following the example of Jesus, chose the path of service, love and peace for his life".
- The Society of Saint Pius X had called upon its members to pray for the repose of Francis's soul.

==== Other denominations ====
- Pope Tawadros II, head of the Coptic Orthodox Church offered his condolences to Catholics, "remembering this beloved servant and dear brother for his sincere love and true example of Christian humility, which he demonstrated throughout his fruitful journey of service."
- Stephen Cottrell, the Archbishop of York, speaking on behalf of the Church of England, paid tribute to the pope's "service of the poor, his love of neighbour – especially the displaced, migrants, the asylum seeker – his deep compassion for the well-being of the earth, and his desire to lead and build the church in new ways." Justin Welby, the former Archbishop of Canterbury, said: "From the very first days of his papacy he was an example of humility. He constantly reminded us of the importance of serving the poor, always standing with those who faced persecution and hardship."
- Sean Rowe, the Presiding Bishop of the Episcopal Church, expressed: "In 12 years as the Roman Catholic pontiff, Pope Francis transformed our theology of the environment and recognized the need for LGBTQ+ people to feel heard, seen, and included in their church."
- Bartholomew I, the Ecumenical Patriarch of Constantinople expressed his sorrow at the loss of "his brother Pope Francis" describing the late pontiff as "a faithful friend, fellow traveler, and supporter of the Ecumenical Patriarchate, a genuine friend of Orthodoxy, a genuine friend of the least of the Lord's brethren, on whose behalf he often spoke, acted, and washed their feet, as an example of true humility and brotherly love." He noted that he and Pope Francis had hoped to mark the 1,700th anniversary of the First Council of Nicaea together in Turkey in 2025.
- Patriarch Kirill of Moscow, head of the Russian Orthodox Church, via a spokesman praised Francis' role in ecumenical dialogue and humanitarian cooperation, saying that "the personality of Pope Francis was of significant importance in the development of that cooperation.”
- Porfirije, Patriarch of the Serbian Orthodox Church, expressed his condolences "to the Diocese of Rome and the entire Roman Catholic Church," recalling that Pope Francis "was a man who built peace and understanding amongst the people and the nations, with a special desire to foster cooperation with the Orthodox Churches."
- The First Presidency of The Church of Jesus Christ of Latter-day Saints expressed its condolences and praised Francis for "his courageous and compassionate leadership".
- The Community of Christ issued a condolence statement saying "With deep sorrow and in unity with others around the world, Community of Christ extends our heartfelt condolences to the Catholic Church and all those mourning the passing of Pope Francis. His unwavering commitment to faith, compassion, and justice has touched the lives of countless individuals across the globe."
- Kirsten Fehrs, President of the Council of the Evangelical Church in Germany stated "his human approachability and sincere humility were deeply impressive" and praised his "attention to the misery in the world".
- Anne Burghardt, General Secretary of the Lutheran World Federation paid tribute to the progress on ecumenism and his "compassionate service to others".
- Heinrich Bedford-Strohm, Head of the Central Committee of the World Council of Churches called the pope an inspiration to continue their work "for justice, reconciliation, and unity". General Secretary Jerry Pillay described his pontificate a "church of the poor, for the poor".
- Mihailo Dedeić of the Montenegrin Orthodox Church said that his church would mourn "the passing of the Holy Father Francis, the great apostle for the Unity of Christians and for the defense of Creation."
- Primate Epiphanius of Kyiv of the Orthodox Church of Ukraine expressed his sorrow on the pope's passing, him as a devoted servant of God and outlined his "concern for the fate of Ukrainians suffering from Russian aggression".
- Patriarch Ilia II of Georgia of the Georgian Orthodox Church mourned Pope Francis death with "great sadness," praising his humility, peace efforts, and support for Georgia, and expressed gratitude for the Pope's "respect for our country and our Church."
- The Methodist Church in Britain issued a statement on its website, saying "Pope Francis was a man of deep Christian faith, clear conviction, and prayer. His ministry extended beyond the Catholic Church as he sought to pray and work for the unity of all Christians."
- The Metropolitan Community Church issued a statement, saying "Pope Francis spoke out on many justice issues, including the environment, opened up the dialogue about women in ministry, and offered a less judgmental tone on LGBT+ rights. We also pray for the College of Cardinals, now tasked with the sad duty of electing a new Pontiff. We pray for their collective wisdom as they look towards the future of their Church, and to the future of all peace-loving churches and individuals around the world.”
- The United Church of Christ issued a statement, saying "The United Church of Christ joins with the global community in mourning the death of Pope Francis and grieving his absence from among us. On this Easter Monday, in the shadows of the resurrection, we join in celebrating his life and commending his soul to eternal rest. His ministry among us was one of simplicity and example, a life of courage in the face of emerging issues requiring the attention of the church. His life was lived in following the example of Jesus.”
- Elizabeth Eaton, the Presiding Bishop of the Evangelical Lutheran Church in America, issued a pastoral message saying "On this Easter Monday, we of the Evangelical Lutheran Church in America join with people around the world in heartfelt grief at the death of Pope Francis, and we celebrate his life eternal in Jesus Christ. In particular, we will remember Pope Francis for his significant contributions to the dialogue of life between Lutherans and Catholics, advancing the Joint Declaration on the Doctrine of Justification. We will recall with amazement his participation alongside the Lutheran World Federation in a joint ecumenical commemoration of the 500th anniversary of the Reformation on 31 October 2016."
- The Rev. Jihyun Oh, Stated Clerk of the General Assembly of the Presbyterian Church (U.S.A.), issued the following message: "The Presbyterian Church (U.S.A.) joins with the global community in mourning the death of Pope Francis and grieving his absence among us even as we look toward the celebration his life on Saturday and commend his soul to God, to whom we all belong, in life and in death. Many Presbyterians were grateful to see Pope Francis emphasize this important aspect of Christian faith and felt encouraged in our own embrace of those who are most vulnerable in society. Many Presbyterians were also grateful for and encouraged by the pope’s commitment to social justice and environmental stewardship."

=== Judaism ===
- Ronald Lauder, president of the World Jewish Congress, stated that Pope Francis was “a true moral leader, a man of deep faith and humanity, and a faithful friend of the Jewish people.”
- Pinchas Goldschmidt, president of the Conference of European Rabbis, said Francis showed an "unwavering dedication to promoting peace and goodwill worldwide".
- The Jewish Federations of North America called Pope Francis "a friend of the Jewish community and all religious traditions" who continued the post-Nostra Aetate policy of interreligious dialogue.
- The American Jewish Committee praised Pope Francis for condemning Antisemitism, stating that "Francis made pilgrimages that were substantial reflections of the new era in the Church's understanding of Jews, Judaism, and the State of Israel."
- The Latin American Rabbinical Assembly sends its condolences on the death of Pope Francis and praised his spirit of holding fraternal meetings between rabbis and Catholics.
- The European Jewish Congress sent its condolences and praised Pope Francis for "his unwavering commitment to combating anti-Semitism and fostering a spirit of brotherhood between Christians and Jews will be remembered with gratitude and admiration."
- The Chief Rabbi of the United Kingdom, Ephraim Mirvis, declare that "I know this is a time of great sadness for our Catholic friends, and I stand with them in this mourning, as they reflect on their leadership and prepare for the transition."
- Rick Jacobs, president of the Union for Reform Judaism, sents his condolencies and declared admiration by stating that "He honored the shared heritage of our religions and took significant steps to heal historical wounds, reinforcing a path toward mutual respect and collaboration. We especially appreciate Pope Francis' constant calls for dialogue and mutual respect between Israelis and Palestinians."

=== Islam ===
- Ahmadiyya Muslim community – Mirza Masroor Ahmad, Caliph of the Islamic messianic movement, condoled the death of Francis, calling him a man who "strived to build bridges between people of different faiths and beliefs". Recalling the Pope's "warm" and "graceful" welcoming of Ahmadi representatives in the Vatican in the past, he extended his condolences on behalf of the whole community to all followers of the Catholic Church.
- Nizari Isma'ili community – Imam Aga Khan V praised Francis's "courageous stance in defending the values of compassion and service to others" and offered his condolences and prayers.
- Ahmed el-Tayeb, Grand Imam of al-Azhar, described Pope Francis as his "brother in humanity", praising him for "supporting the causes of the weak and promoting dialogue between different religions and cultures".
- Grand Ayatollah Ali al-Sistani, leader of the Shia Muslim community in Iraq, said that the pope achieved "a high spiritual status among many peoples of the world" and was globally respected, recalling their meeting in the Iraqi city of Najaf.
- Chems-Eddine Hafiz, rector of the Grand Mosque of Paris, paid tribute to an "emblematic figure of interreligious dialogue and human fraternity" who "marked our times with his humanity".
- Baba Mondi, the Bektashi Dedebabate and proposed-head of the Vatican-like Sovereign State of the Bektashi Order, praised Francis's shared work towards "fraternal coexistence".

=== Buddhism ===
- The Dalai Lama wrote that "Pope Francis dedicated himself to the service of others, consistently revealing by his own actions how to live a simple, but meaningful life."
- Ariyavongsagatanana IX, the Supreme Patriarch of Thailand, wrote that "Now, that Holy Father has departed this world, transcending the afflictions of the corporeal form and bidding farewell to his friends in the human realm. Yet what remains is the enduring fruit of his compassion: the legacy of goodwill he tirelessly sowed, which continues to inspire profound reverence among people of all nations and faiths."
- Hsin Bau, head abbot of the Fo Guang Shan Buddhist order of Taiwan, expressed condolences and shared his recollections from his 2023 visit to Vatican City, remarking, "May [Francis] return again by vow to continue inspiring humanity to pursue a better, more peaceful world."

=== Hinduism ===
- Rajan Zed, President of the Universal Society of Hinduism, encouraged leaders of different religions to come together in prayer for Pope Francis. He acknowledged the Pope's efforts in advocating for values such as compassion, inclusivity, and moral courage, and called for prayers supporting his recovery and ongoing role as a global religious figure.

== Indigenous groups ==
- Metis National Council – Reflecting on leading the Métis delegation of residental school survivors to the Vatican in March 2022, former Métis National Council President Cassidy Caron noted that Pope Francis was "a man who was kind, deeply moved by our stories, and who genuinely wanted to do the right thing." Caron also noted that the Pope's apology was "powerful" but that the work of reconcilliation must continue.
- Inuit Tapiriit Kanatami – Inuit Tapiriit Kanatami President Natan Obed observed that "the relationship that we (Inuit) have with the Catholic Church is complicated, I don't have complicated feelings towards Pope Francis, he set out to work on reconciliation, he, I would imagine pushed back against his own Church policies and leadership within the Vatican and for that I'll always be thankful." Obed noted that seeing the Pope interact with "Inuit, First Nations and Métis, you could tell that he had a humanity for all of us, that his humanity was his empathy, his graciousness and his ability to listen."
- Assembly of First Nations - Assembly of First Nations National Chief Cindy Woodhouse Nepinak stated that "we've lost an ally today" and that she joined "people from around the world of mourning this great loss of Pope Francis, he listened to us, he listened to our survivors." She recalled that the "history with the Catholic Church with First Nations is very long and negative with Residential Schools but I think Pope Francis, he opened up a new chapter for healing." She noted that many First Nations people accepted the Pope's apology but that "some still didn't and are still coming to grips with that." She encouraged the Church to fulfill Pope Francis' promise of returning Indigenous artifacts and ceremonial items to Canada.

== Royal houses and monarchical organizations ==
- The House of Wittelsbach stated "together with all the faithful, we mourn the loss of Pope Francis" and expressed gratefulness that some of its members were able to receive the Pope's last Easter Urbi et Orbi blessing.
- The Brazilian imperial family (Vassouras branch headed by Bertrand of Orléans-Braganza) expressed its condolences to Cardinal Kevin Farrell.
- The Croatian Royal Council (Croatian and Bosnian monarchists loyal to House of Habsburg-Lorraine) expressed condolences and called on followers to join in prayers for the Pope's soul.
- Jean, Count of Paris (head of the Orléanist faction as Jean IV) expressed his admiration to Francis for reminding the world of the power of the Gospel lived in charity and for building bridges between peoples, also thanking him for his honorable visits to France and joining Catholics in prayer for Francis, committing themselves to develop prayer groups with Croatian clergy.
- The Cercle d'action legitimiste (in the name of Legitimist faction loyals to Louis XX Alphonse de Bourbon) entrusted followers to pray for the repose of Pope Francis' soul for being in need of God's mercy, as well as to implore the Lord for the election of a new pope in the next conclave.
- Prince Aimone, Duke of Aosta (disputed head of the House of Savoy and head of the Savoy-Aosta branch, pretender to the Kingdom of Italy) said that he was "heartbroken by the news of the death of Pope Francis" and that his family would "join, with emotion, in the condolences of the entire Church, which today loses its leader."
- Margareta, Custodian of the Crown of Romania (head of the defunct royal house of Romania), addressed a letter of condolence on behalf of the Royal House and Family to Cardinal Giovanni Battista Re; the letter advised "Pope Francis I was not just a symbol for us but a living example of faith, humanity, dedication and grace for people all over the world, regardless of their religion, especially for those in need. The Sovereign Pontiff had Romania in his heart, and we had him in ours".
- The Traditionalist Communion (in the name of Carlist loyals to Prince Sixtus Henry of Bourbon-Parma) announced that they would offer prayers in Ecclesiastical Latin for the eternal rest of Pope Francis.
- The Constantinian Order of Saint George (headed by Pedro, Prince of Bourbon-Two Sicilies, Duca di Calabria, pretender to the Kingdom of the Two Sicilies) announced that they would join in prayer and reflection for the soul of Pope Francis. They would later participate in a mass for his eternal rest at the Cathedral Basilica of San Lorenzo in the Diocese of Viterbo. They previously suspended an international pilgrimage to Rome out of respect for the mourning.

== Other ==
- The Italian Football Federation, the federation that manages association football leagues in Italy, announced the postponement of its Monday games.
  - AS Roma called the death "a loss that deeply saddens our city and the entire world".
  - Inter Milan expressed condolences, calling the late Pope "a man of faith, humility and dialogue who was able to speak to everyone's heart".
- The Argentine Football Association announced that all matches on 21 April would be postponed.
  - San Lorenzo de Almagro, the football club that Francis was a fan and supporter of, expressed its regret in a statement: "From Mario Jorge Bergoglio (sic) to Francisco, there was one thing that never changed: his love for Ciclón. Wrapped in deep sorrow, from San Lorenzo today we say goodbye to Francisco: goodbye, thank you and see you forever! We will be together for eternity."
- Anne Barrett Doyle, Co-director of the Bishop Accountability Clergy Sex Abuse Tracking Group, said that Pope Francis "was a beacon of hope to many of the world's most desperate and marginalised people. But what we most needed from this pope was justice for the Church's own wounded, the children and adults sexually abused by Catholic clergy. In this realm, where Francis had supreme power, he refused to make the necessary changes".
- Islamic Republic of Afghanistan – The Afghan Embassy in Stockholm offered its condolences, saying that Pope Francis was a symbol of justice, compassion, and support for the downtrodden. It added that the Pope also repeatedly stressed the importance of religious tolerance and, in a meeting with Afghan community representatives in Italy, strongly denounced the use of God's name to legitimize violence, discrimination, and hatred in Afghanistan.
- Brazil – The Central Única dos Trabalhadores (CUT), Brazil's largest trade union, expressed its condolences to the Pope, saying "we express our sincere thanks for his prayers and words of support for workers throughout his papacy" and added that Francis was "a great voice for social justice".
- A minute silence was held in a SPFL tie between Celtic and Dundee United with Celtic players and personnel also wearing black armbands to pay respects to the late Pontiff.
- People's Republic of China – In Wenzhou, police prevented masses in memory of Pope Francis from being celebrated.
- Hamas – The armed group and current de facto government of the Gaza Strip, released an official statement that it mourned the death of Pope Francis whilst also praising his condemnation of the ongoing genocide in Gaza.
- Hezbollah – The Lebanese Shia political and paramilitary group expressed condolences and issued a statement of mourning following Pope Francis's death whilst also praised his position in the Gaza war.
- Islamic State (ISIS) – the Islamic State issued a response through its official media channels. In an editorial published in its weekly Al-Naba newsletter, the group condemned global expressions of mourning, characterizing them as a betrayal of Islamic monotheism. The editorial specifically criticized Grand Imam of al-Azhar, Ahmed el-Tayeb, for offering condolences, accusing him and other Muslim leaders of aligning themselves with the Vatican and abandoning core Islamic principles.
- National Unity Government of Myanmar – The government in exile offered its condolences, saying that the Pope's compassion for the people of Myanmar and his unyielding voice for peace gave them hope throughout their darkest moments.

== Official mourning ==
Per custom, the Holy See observed a mourning period of nine days, beginning from the day of Francis's funeral on 26 April 2025. Several states and territories also declared national mourning.

Territory	Number of mourning days	Calendar days	Notes
Vatican City	9	26 April – 4 May	
Argentina	7	22–28 April	
Brazil	7	22–28 April	
Timor-Leste	7	22–28 April	
Puerto Rico	6	21–26 April	
Italy	5	22–26 April	
Paraguay	5	22–26 April	
São Tomé and Príncipe	5	22–26 April	
Costa Rica	4	21–24 April	
Philippines	4	23–26 April	
Seychelles	4	22–24 and 26 April	
Chile	3	22–24 April	
Cuba	3	22–24 April	
Dominican Republic	3	22–24 April	
Ecuador	3	22–24 April	
Guatemala	3	22–24 April	
Lebanon	3	22–24 April	
Jordan	3	22–24 April	
Panama	3	22–24 April	
Peru	3	22–24 April	
Spain	3	22–24 April	
Venezuela	3	22–24 April	
India	3	22–23 and 26 April	
Equatorial Guinea	3	23–25 April	
Palestine	3	23–25 April	
Thailand	3	23–25 April	
Bangladesh	3	24–26 April	
Belize	3	24–26 April	
Monaco	3	24–26 April	
Mozambique	3	24–26 April	
Portugal	3	24–26 April	
Gabon	3	25–27 April	
Cape Verde	2	23–24 April	
Malta	2	22 and 26 April	
South Sudan	1	25 April	(Note: The national government of South Sudan declared 25 April 2025, as a National Public Holiday to mourn the Pope's death)
Albania	1	26 April	
Bosnia and Herzegovina	1	26 April	
Croatia	1	26 April	
Hungary	1	26 April	
Lithuania	1	26 April	
Poland	1	26 April	
Romania	1	26 April	
Slovakia	1	26 April	
Slovenia	1	26 April	
Sri Lanka	1	26 April	
Uruguay	1	26 April	
Central African Republic	1	26 April	
Zambia	1	26 April	
