= Dalibor Riccardi =

Captain Regent of San Marino from 2024 to 2025

Captain Regent of San Marino
- In office 1 October 2024 – 1 April 2025 Serving with Francesca Civerchia
- Preceded by: Alessandro Rossi; Milena Gasperoni
- Succeeded by: Denise Bronzetti; Italo Righi

Personal details
- Born: 4 September 1983 (age 43) Borgo Maggiore, San Marino
- Party: Libera (since 2020)
- Other political affiliations: PSD (until 2018); RES (2018–2020)
- Education: University of Urbino
Association football career
- Position: Defender
Senior career*
Years	Team	Apps	(Gls)
2008–2010	S.S. Cosmos	4	(0)
2009–2010	SP La Fiorita	6	(0)
2010–2013	SS Folgore Falciano Calcio	40	(2)
2013–2014	AC Libertas	7	(1)
2013–2014	SS Folgore Falciano Calcio	3	(0)
2014–2016	AC Virtus	11	(0)
- * Club domestic league appearances and goals

Dalibor Riccardi (born 4 September 1983) is a Sammarinese politician and former footballer who served as one of two captains regent for San Marino from October 2024 to April 2025.

== Biography ==
Riccardi was born on 4 September 1983 in Borgo Maggiore, San Marino. He attended the University of Urbino in Italy, graduating with a degree in legal sciences. He was employed in the private sector as a clerk. He is passionate about sports and competed in football and padel. Riccardi competed several years in the San Marino's top football division, Campionato Sammarinese di Calcio, beginning his career with S.S. Cosmos in 2008.

A defender, Riccardi appeared in four matches for Cosmos in the 2009–10 season. He also split the season with SP La Fiorita, for which he played six matches. He was a member of SS Folgore Falciano Calcio from 2010 to 2013, playing in 40 matches while scoring two goals. He started the 2013–14 season with AC Libertas, scoring one goal while making seven appearances, before returning to Folgore for the end of the season, helping them be the runner-ups of the league. Riccardi concluded his career with AC Virtus from 2014 to 2016, for which he made 11 appearances. He finished his career in the Campionato Sammarinese di Calcio having made 71 appearances, scoring three goals.

Riccardi began his political career in 2010, being elected to the Serravalle council, where he served two terms. In 2016, he was elected to San Marino's parliament, the Grand and General Council, as a member of the Party of Socialists and Democrats (PSD). He was sworn in to the parliament during the time that his father, Marino Riccardi, was serving as Captain Regent (dual head of state). He was appointed the leader of PSD, but later announced that he was leaving the party in 2018, forming a new party, Riforme e Sviluppo (RES), along with several others who had left the PSD.

After being re-elected in 2019, Riccardi helped form the Libera San Marino (Libera) party in 2020, which he became president of. In the Grand and General Council, he became a member of the foreign affairs, territorial policies and Council of XII commissions. His party formed an alliance with the Socialist Party (PS) for the 2024 general elections, and later that year, he was elected one of two Captains Regent (with Francesca Civerchia) for the six month term starting in October 2024.
