= Maurizio Rattini =

Sammarinese politician

Captain Regent of San Marino
- In office 1 April 2012 – 1 October 2012 Serving with Italo Righi
- Preceded by: Matteo Fiorini; Gabriele Gatti
- Succeeded by: Teodoro Lonfernini; Denise Bronzetti
- In office 1 October 1996 – 1 April 1997 Serving with Gian Carlo Venturini
- Preceded by: Pier Paolo Gasperoni; Pietro Bugli
- Succeeded by: Paride Andreoli; Pier Marino Mularoni

Personal details
- Born: 13 November 1949 (age 76) City of San Marino, San Marino
- Party: Socialist Party [since 2012); New Socialist Party (2005–2012)

Maurizio Rattini (born 13 November 1949) is a Sammarinese politician who was a Captain Regent, from 1 April 2012 to 1 October 2012, with Italo Righi. He also served as a Captain Regent from 1 October 1996 – 1 April 1997, with Gian Carlo Venturini.
