= Bronzetti =

Bronzetti is a surname of Italian origin. Notable people with the surname include:

- Denise Bronzetti (born 1972), Sammarinese politician
- Lucia Bronzetti (born 1998), Italian tennis player

== See also ==
- Italian destroyer Pilade Bronzetti, an Italian destroyer commissioned in 1915 and renamed Giuseppe Dezza in 1921
