= Domani Motus Liberi =

Tomorrow – Free Movement Domani – Motus Liberi
- Abbreviation: DML
- President: Lorenzo Forcellini Reffi
- Secretary-General: Carlotta Andruccioli
- Founders: Carlotta Andruccioli; Simone Casadei; Daniela Marchetti; Elia Moroni; Samuele Pelliccioni; Fabio Righi; Gaetano Troina
- Founded: April 28, 2018
- Headquarters: Via Luigi Cibrario 25, 47893 Borgo Maggiore
- Ideology: Conservatism; Liberalism; Soft Euroscepticism
- Political position: Centre-right
- European affiliation: European Conservatives and Reformists Party (global partner)
- Italian counterpart: Brothers of Italy
- Colours: Blue
- Grand and General Council: 5 / 60

Website
- www.domanimotusliberi.org

Domani – Motus Liberi (DML; lit. 'Tomorrow – Free Movement') is a Christian-liberal political party in San Marino. The party was officially formed on April 28, 2018.

== History ==
=== Origins ===
The first group of people, which then led to the establishment of Domani Motus Liberi, began to carry out their business in 2016. DML was born at a difficult time for the Republic of San Marino, characterized by the crisis of traditional politics that led to numerous political and financial scandals of the second decade of the 21st century and which led to the establishment of a parliamentary commission of inquiry into the San Marino banking system.

The party was formed on April 28, 2018, and the party's founding members are: Carlotta Andruccioli, Simone Casadei, Lorenzo Forcellini Reffi, Daniela Marchetti, Elia Moroni, Samuele Pelliccioni, Fabio Righi and Gaetano Troina.

The newly founded party presented itself to the press on June 26, 2018.

The first elections in which the party participated were held on December 8, 2019.

=== History after 2019 elections ===
In the 2019 general election, DML presented itself for the first time and obtained a percentage of 6.19%, exceeding the threshold, with 1,112 votes. Following the exploratory mandate entrusted by the Captains Regent, a majority was formed made up of the lists of the Sammarinese Christian Democratic Party, RETE Movement, Domani Motus Liberi, and Noi per la Repubblica: DML consequently obtained 4 seats out of 60 in the Grand and General Council and the ownership of the Secretariat of State for Industry, Handicraft and Commerce, with the powers to Simplify Regulations and Technological Research. Members of the DML Board Group are Carlotta Andruccioli, Michela Pelliccioni, Gaetano Troina and Mirko Dolcini, who also holds the position of chairman of the board Group.

=== First Regency of DML ===
On October 1, 2020 Mirko Dolcini was elected as Captain Regent for the semester of October 1, 2020 – April 1, 2021, together with Alessandro Cardelli. In replacement of Mirko Dolcini, for the regency semester, the role of President of the DML Council Group is held by Gaetano Troina.

=== Party structure and offices ===
Following the elections of 2019, the DML Assembly elected Lorenzo Forcellini Reffi as the new President of the party and the Central Coordination elected, from within it, the following positions: Gaetano Troina as Secretary General, Daniele Cherubini as Head of Communications, Elisa Zafferani as Person in Charge of International Relations.

On September 29, 2020, the party headquarters were officially inaugurated, located in Borgo Maggiore in Via Luigi Cibrario n. 25.

== Electoral results ==
Grand and General Council
Election	Leader	Votes	%	Seats	+/–	Government
2019	Mirko Dolcini	1,112	6.19 (#6)	4 / 60		Coalition
2024	Lorenzo Forcellini Reffi	1,540	8.47 (#5)	5 / 60	▲1	Opposition
