= Marco Nicolini =

Sammarinese politician

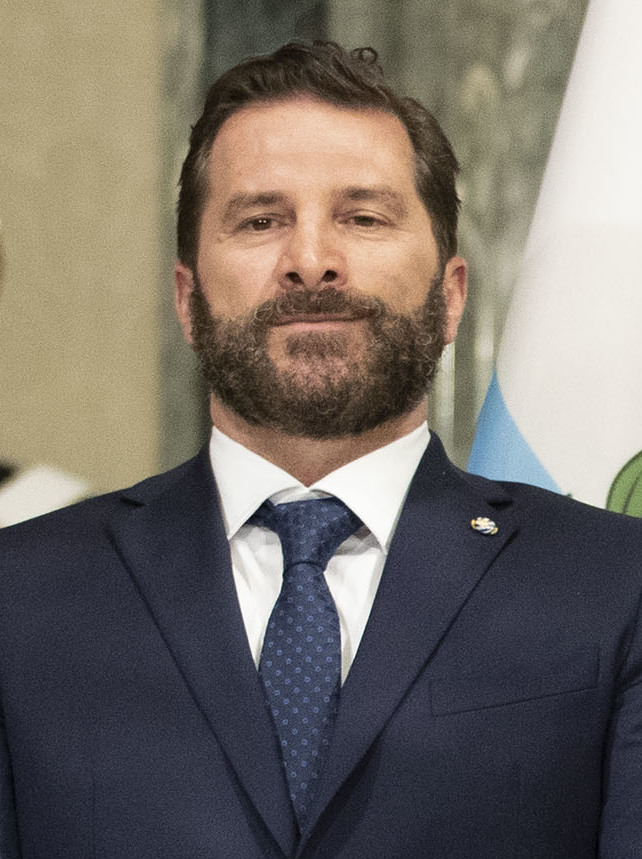
- Nicolini in 2021

Captain Regent of San Marino
- In office 1 April 2021 – 1 October 2021 Serving with Gian Carlo Venturini
- Preceded by: Alessandro Cardelli; Mirko Dolcini
- Succeeded by: Francesco Mussoni; Giacomo Simoncini

Personal details
- Born: 15 September 1970 (age 56) Piove di Sacco, Veneto, Italy
- Party: RETE Movement
- Spouse: Rebecca
- Children: 2
- Education: University of Urbino

Marco Nicolini (born 15 September 1970) is a Sammarinese writer and politician and one of the Captains Regent with Gian Carlo Venturini from 1 April until 1 October 2021.

== Life ==
Born in Piove di Sacco from Sammarinese father and Italian mother, and grew up in Padua, Italy, Nicolini graduated the Barbarigo Episcopal Institute of Padua and after that, the Faculty of Foreign Languages and Literatures at the University of Urbino.

He worked in the tourism sector while residing in different countries and in 1999, at the age of twenty-eight, he returned to San Marino, and worked in two financial companies and a banking institution. Nicolini joined the RETE Movement and in 2016 he was elected a member of the Grand and General Council, where he held the position of a President of the San Marino Delegation at the Council of Europe, in Strasbourg.

Nicolini has published a book of boxing literature, along the lines of his Facebook page Nicolini Tells About Boxers, which has achieved some editorial success. Recently, by AIEP Edition, he published an anthology of short stories entitled Sottacqua.

He is married to Rebecca and is the father of two children.

Since 23 January 2023, he has been Vice-President of the Parliamentary Assembly of the Council of Europe.

== Publications ==
- Storie di pugili. Prato: Piano B. 2018. ISBN 9788893710565.
- Sottacqua. City of San Marino: AIEP. 2020. ISBN 9788860861818.
- Mille pugili. Salerno: Burno. 2022. ISBN 9791280772015.
- Il contrario di Benny. Salerno: Burno. 2024. ISBN 9791280772176.

== Honours ==
=== Foreign honours ===
- Italy : Knight Grand Cross with Collar of the Order of Merit of the Italian Republic (16 June 2021)
