= Sammarinese Reformist Socialist Party =

Sammarinese Reformist Socialist Party Partito Socialista Riformista Sammarinese
- Leader: Simone Celli
- Founded: 1 May 2009
- Dissolved: 30 May 2012
- Split from: Party of Socialists and Democrats
- Merged into: Socialist Party
- Ideology: Social democracy Reformism; Progressivism
- Political position: Centre-left

The Sammarinese Reformist Socialist Party (Italian: Partito Socialista Riformista Sammarinese, PSRS) was a social-democratic political party in San Marino formed from a regional split from the Party of Socialists and Democrats in Borgo Maggiore.

On 30 May 2012, the party merged with the New Socialist Party to form the modern-day Socialist Party.
