= Milena Gasperoni =

Sammarinese politician (born 1961)

Captain Regent of San Marino
- In office 1 April 2024 – 1 October 2024 Serving with Alessandro Rossi
- Preceded by: Filippo Tamagnini; Gaetano Troina
- Succeeded by: Francesca Civerchia; Dalibor Riccardi

Personal details
- Born: 23 September 1961 (age 65) City of San Marino, San Marino
- Party: Party of Socialists and Democrats
- Other political affiliations: We for the Republic (2019–2024)
- Education: University of Bologna

Milena Gasperoni (born 23 September 1961) is a Sammarinese politician who was one of two Captains Regent (dual head of state) for San Marino from April 2024 to October 2024, serving alongside Alessandro Rossi.

== Biography ==
Gasperoni was born on 23 September 1961 in City of San Marino. She attended the University of Bologna in Italy where she received a degree in law. She later attended the law school and received a master's degree in administrative law. In the 1990s, she worked professionally in Emilia-Romagna as a lawyer and notary.

In 1995, Gasperoni was appointed the head of Ufficio Programmazione Economica e Centro Elaborazione Dati e Statistica, the economic planning, data processing and statistics office of San Marino. She served in the role through 2003 before receiving a position in 2004 with the Department of Foreign Affairs. She then was the director of the Labor Office from 2005 to 2012 and was director of the San Marino Centro di Formazione Professionale from 2012 to 2023.

Gasperoni was appointed to the Grand and General Council in May 2015 to fill a vacancy caused by the resignations of Claudio Felici and Stefano Macina, serving until the 2016 election and being a member of the Party of Socialists and Democrats (PSD). As a member of the council, Gasperoni helped draft several bills, including bills on trademarks and patents and regulating the labor market.

In October 2023, Gasperoni was appointed to the council for a second time, replacing the resigning Giacomo Simoncini. She became a member of the commissions on constitutional affairs and finance. In March 2024, Gasperoni was narrowly elected, along with Alessandro Rossi, as one of two Captains Regent (head of government), which was seen as a surprise as she was nominated by the opposition alliance, Noi per la Repubblica (We for the Republic).
