= Carlotta Andruccioli =

Sammarinese politician (born 1997)

Member of the Great and General Council
- Incumbent
- Assumed office 2019

Secretary-General of Domani Motus Liberi
- Incumbent
- Assumed office July 2022

Personal details
- Born: January 1, 1997 (age 29)
- Party: Domani Motus Liberi
- Occupation: Politician

Carlotta Andruccioli (born 1 January 1997) is a Sammarinese politician. She is the secretary-general of the Domani Motus Liberi party since 2022 and member of the Great and General Council since 2019.

== Career ==
Andruccioli was born on 1 January 1997. In 2016, her name appeared among the students who earned the highest score of 100/100 on the San Marino upper secondary school final exams. She holds a PhD in International and Diplomatic Studies.

She was elected member of the Great and General Council in the 2019 general election for Domani Motus Liberi. Andruccioli was re-elected in the 2024 election.

Following the party convention, Andruccioli became the secretary-general of Domani Motus Liberi in July 2022, and she also took charge of the press office. She was re-elected on 25 May 2025.
