= Gian Carlo Venturini =

Sammarinese politician (born 1962)

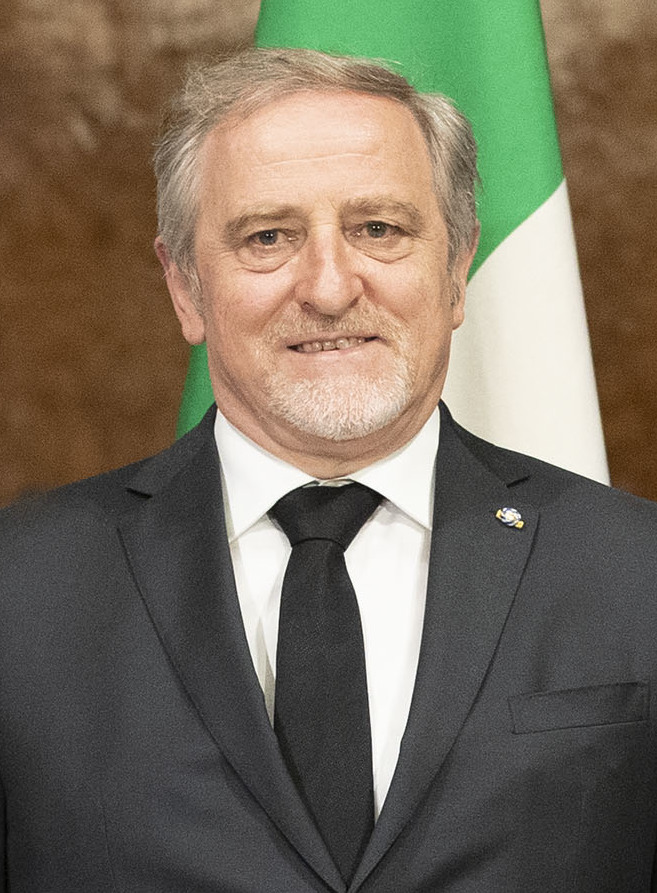
- Venturini in 2021

Captain Regent of San Marino
- In office 1 April 2021 – 1 October 2021 Serving with Marco Nicolini
- Preceded by: Alessandro Cardelli; Mirko Dolcini
- Succeeded by: Francesco Mussoni; Giacomo Simoncini
- In office 1 October 1996 – 1 April 1997 Serving with Maurizio Rattini
- Preceded by: Pier Paolo Gasperoni; Pietro Bugli
- Succeeded by: Paride Andreoli; Pier Marino Mularoni

Political Secretary of the Sammarinese Christian Democratic Party
- Incumbent
- Assumed office 6 March 2017
- President: Luca Beccari; Pasquale Valentini
- Preceded by: Marco Gatti

Additional positions
- 2012–2016: Secretary of State for Internal Affairs
- 2008–2012: Secretary of State for the Territory and the Environment
- 2002–2003: Secretary of State for Labor and Cooperation
- 1993–present: Member of the Grand and General Council
- 1989–1991: Captain of Borgo Maggiore

Personal details
- Born: 25 February 1962 (age 64) City of San Marino, San Marino
- Party: Sammarinese Christian Democratic Party (since 1986)
- Education: University of Urbino

Gian Carlo Venturini (born 25 February 1962) is a Sammarinese politician who has served as Secretary of the Sammarinese Christian Democratic Party since 2017. He was one of the Captains Regent with Maurizio Rattini from 1 October 1996 until 1 April 1997 and the second time with Marco Nicolini from 1 April until 1 October 2021.

== Life ==
Born in City of San Marino, Venturini obtained the Diploma of laboratory technician at the University of Urbino in 1984, and is an employee of the Institute for Social Security.

He has been a member of the Sammarinese Christian Democratic Party since 1986 and held the position of Deputy Secretary from 1997 to April 2002 and subsequently from March 2007 to December 2008.

From 1989 to 1991 he held the position of Captain of Borgo Maggiore and in 1993 he was elected a member of the Grand and General Council; he was then reconfirmed in the general elections of 1998, 2001, 2006, 2008 and the last of 2012.

He held the position of Captain Regent of the Republic of San Marino in the semester 1 October 1996 – 1 April 1997. He served alongside Maurizio Rattini. In recent years he has also been a member of various Permanent Council Commissions, of the Council of XII and of the Urban Planning Commission, now the Commission for Territorial Policies.

He was a member of the Congress of State in 2002 as Secretary of State for Health and Social Security, from December 2002 as Secretary of State for Labor and Cooperation, then from December 2003 to June 2006 as Secretary of State for the Territory and the Environment, Agriculture and Relations with the AASP

From 3 December 2008, for the XXVII Legislature, he was appointed Secretary of State for the Territory and the Environment, Agriculture and Relations with the AASP.

Since July 2012 he has been conferred ad interim the delegation: Justice and Relations with the Giunte di Castello. From 5 December 2012, for the XXVIII Legislature, he was appointed Secretary of State for Internal Affairs, Public Administration, Justice and Relations with the Castle Councils.

He once again held the position of Captain Regent of the Republic of San Marino in the semester 1 April – 1 October 2021. He served alongside Marco Nicolini.
