= Mirko Dolcini =

Captain Regent of San Marino

Captain Regent of San Marino
- In office 1 October 2020 – 1 April 2021 Serving with Alessandro Cardelli
- Preceded by: Alessandro Mancini; Grazia Zafferani
- Succeeded by: Gian Carlo Venturini; Marco Nicolini

Personal details
- Born: 13 November 1973 (age 52) City of San Marino, San Marino
- Party: Domani Motus Liberi (since 2018)
- Education: University of Urbino

Mirko Dolcini (born 13 November 1973) is a Sammarinese politician, the head of the political party Domani Motus Liberi and one of the Captains Regent with Alessandro Cardelli. Their joint term was from 1 October 2020 until 1 April 2021.

== Life ==
After graduating in law at the University of Urbino, he obtained a Master's in "Specialization in San Marino Law". Since 2003 he has run his own studio. He was President of O.S.L.A., also holding the roles of Vice President and Chief Editor of the association's newspaper. He joined the Domani Motus Liberi and has served as a member of the Grand and General Council from the last elections since 2019.

Dolcini is the father of a child with his wife Monica and he has a twin brother.
