= Grazia Zafferani =

Sammarinese politician

Captain Regent of San Marino
- In office 1 April 2020 – 1 October 2020 Serving with Alessandro Mancini
- Preceded by: Luca Boschi; Mariella Mularoni
- Succeeded by: Alessandro Cardelli; Mirko Dolcini

Personal details
- Born: 31 December 1972 (age 53) City of San Marino, San Marino
- Party: RETE Movement

Grazia Zafferani (born 31 December 1972) is a Sammarinese politician and one of the Captains Regent with Alessandro Mancini from 1 April 2020. The joint terms of Zafferani and Mancini expired on 1 October 2020.

== Life ==
Zafferani worked as an entrepreneur in the field of clothing and after that remained in the field of commerce. She is married and is a mother of four daughters. She also became a founding member and the first President of the RETE Movement in 2012 and has served as a member of the Grand and General Council for three consecutive elections since 2013.

She is a granddaughter of Luigi Zafferani, who served as a Captain Regent in 1947 and a niece of Rossano Zafferani, who held the same post in 1987–1988.
