= Teodoro Lonfernini =

Sammarinese politician

Captain Regent of San Marino
- In office 1 October 2012 – 1 April 2013 Serving with Denise Bronzetti
- Preceded by: Italo Righi; Maurizio Rattini
- Succeeded by: Antonella Mularoni; Denis Amici

Personal details
- Born: 12 May 1976 (age 50) City of San Marino, San Marino
- Party: Sammarinese Christian Democratic Party

Teodoro Lonfernini (born 12 May 1976) is a Sammarinese politician and former Captain Regent. He held the post from 1 October 2012 to 1 April 2013, with Denise Bronzetti. He was previously a member of the Grand and General Council.

Lonfernini was the second captain regent of this name, the previous one having served in 1944–1945; see List of Captains Regent of San Marino.
