= Francesca Civerchia =

Sammarinese politician (born 1977)

Captain Regent of San Marino
- In office 1 October 2024 – 1 April 2025 Serving with Dalibor Riccardi
- Preceded by: Alessandro Rossi; Milena Gasperoni
- Succeeded by: Denise Bronzetti; Italo Righi

Personal details
- Born: 18 September 1977 (age 48) City of San Marino, San Marino
- Party: PDCS
- Education: University of Urbino, University of Bologna
- Occupation: Politician; Sociologist

Francesca Civerchia (born 18 September 1977) is a Sammarinese politician who was one of two captains regent for San Marino from October 2024 to April 2025.

== Early life and career ==
Born on 18 September 1977 in San Marino, Civerchia graduated in health sociology and later specialized in communication, criminology, pathological addictions and disability. Since 2000 she has worked as a sociologist at the Social Security Institute of San Marino, where she is responsible for the disability and residential care service.

== Political career ==
Since 2013, Civerchia has been a member of the Sammarinese Christian Democratic Party (PDCS), of which she has been a member since 2019.

In the 2019 general election, she was elected for the PDCS to the Grand and General Council and was re-elected in 2024. 2021, Civerchia presented a bill, approved by a large majority in 2022, to implement forms of support for single pregnant women and single-parent families in serious social and economic conditions. She was a member of the permanent council commission on Hygiene and Health and the Foreign Affairs commission, as well as the council commission of inquiry into alleged political responsibilities or administrative credit companies. Furthermore, she was a member of the Council of Twelve and was head of delegation to the Parliamentary Assembly of the Mediterranean. Together with Dalibor Riccardi, she was elected Captain Regent for the period 1 October 2024 – 1 April 2025.

== Personal life ==
Civerchia has two children.
