= Socialist Party (San Marino) =

Socialist Party Partito Socialista
- Abbreviation: PS
- Leader: Alessandro Mancini
- Founded: 30 May 2012
- Merger of: NPS, PSRS
- Preceded by: Freedom List
- Headquarters: Via XXVIII Luglio 218, 47893 Borgo Maggiore
- Ideology: Social democracy Third Way; Pro-Europeanism
- Political position: Centre-left
- National affiliation: Libera-PS/PSD
- Italian counterparts: New Italian Socialist Party
- Colours: Light blue Red
- Grand and General Council: 6 / 60

Website
- partitosocialista.sm

The Socialist Party (Italian: Partito Socialista, PS) is a moderate social-democratic political party in San Marino. The party was founded on 30 May 2012 as a merger of the New Socialist Party and Sammarinese Reformist Socialist Party.

During the Sammarinese election of 2012 the party joined the unsuccessful centrist coalition of the Agreement for the Country, even if the party itself obtained quite good results gaining 7 seats.

The party contested the 2016 general election as part of San Marino First, along with the Sammarinese Christian Democratic Party and Party of Socialists and Democrats (PSD). The alliance formed the opposition to the Adesso.sm alliance led by the Democratic Socialist Left, which one the second round runoff election on 4 December 2016.

In April 2024 the party launched an alliance with the PSD and Libera San Marino for the 2024 general election, within which the PS and Libera share an electoral list.

== Electoral history ==
Grand and General Council
Election	Leader	Votes	%	Seats	+/–	Government
2012	Augusto Casali	2,393	12.10 (#3)	7 / 60	New	Coalition
2016	Alessandro Mancini	1,496	7.70 (#6)	3 / 60	▼7	Opposition
2019	Alessandro Mancini	2,359	13.13 (#4) (NplR)	4 / 60	▲1	Coalition
