= Alessandro Mancini =

Sammarinese politician (born 1975)

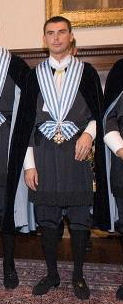

Captain Regent of San Marino
- In office 1 April 2020 – 1 October 2020 Serving with Grazia Zafferani
- Preceded by: Luca Boschi; Mariella Mularoni
- Succeeded by: Alessandro Cardelli; Mirko Dolcini
- In office 1 April 2007 – 1 October 2007 Serving with Alessandro Rossi
- Preceded by: Antonio Carattoni; Roberto Giorgetti
- Succeeded by: Mirko Tomassoni; Alberto Selva

Leader of PSD

Personal details
- Born: 4 October 1975 (age 50) City of San Marino, San Marino
- Party: Party of Socialists and Democrats

Alessandro Mancini (born 4 October 1975) is a Sammarinese politician, who served as Captain Regent of San Marino, for a term of six-months, with Grazia Zafferani, from 1 April to 1 October 2020. Mancini additionally served for the six-month term as Captain Regent from 1 April until 1 October 2007, with Alessandro Rossi.

Mancini is a member of the Party of Socialists and Democrats.
