= Alessandro Rossi (Captain Regent) =

Sammarinese politician

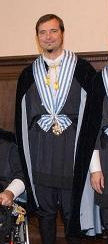

Captain Regent of San Marino
- In office 1 April 2024 – 1 October 2024 Serving with Milena Gasperoni
- Preceded by: Filippo Tamagnini; Gaetano Troina
- Succeeded by: Francesca Civerchia; Dalibor Riccardi
- In office 1 April 2007 – 1 October 2007 Serving with Alessandro Mancini
- Preceded by: Antonio Carattoni; Roberto Giorgetti
- Succeeded by: Mirko Tomassoni; Alberto Selva

Personal details
- Born: 10 August 1967 (age 59) Rimini, Italy
- Party: Demos - Democrazia Solidale (since 2022)
- Other political affiliations: PPDS (1998–2001); PD (2001–2005); SU (2006–2017)
- Education: University of Bologna

Alessandro Rossi (born 10 August 1967) is a Sammarinese politician who served as one of the two Captains Regent of San Marino (dual head of state) from April to October 2024, alongside Milena Gasperoni. Rossi previously served as Captain Regent from 1 April to 1 October 2007, together with Alessandro Mancini. In January 2005 Rossi was the leader of Ideas in Movement, later on 2 October 2006, Rossi would join the Council of Europe until 26 January 2009, then again on 21 January 2013, until 29 September 2013; during that time period Rossi would become a member of Group of the Unified European Left.

Rossi was an independent counsellor belonging to the mixed opposition group in parliament.
