= Alessandro Cardelli =

Sammarinese politician

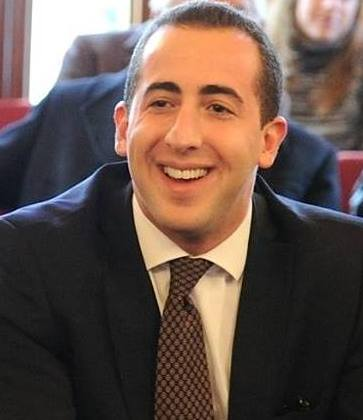
- Cardelli in 2015

Captain Regent of San Marino
- In office 1 October 2020 – 1 April 2021 Serving with Mirko Dolcini
- Preceded by: Alessandro Mancini; Grazia Zafferani
- Succeeded by: Gian Carlo Venturini; Marco Nicolini

Personal details
- Born: 7 May 1991 (age 35) Cesena, Emilia-Romagna, Italy
- Party: Sammarinese Christian Democratic Party
- Education: Libera Università Internazionale degli Studi Sociali Guido Carli

Alessandro Cardelli (born 7 May 1991) is a Sammarinese politician and one of the Captains Regent with Mirko Dolcini, serving from 1 October 2020 until 1 April 2021. During his tenure, he was the youngest state leader in the world and the only head of state under 30 years of age at the time.

== Life ==
Born in Italy, he grew up in Borgo Maggiore in San Marino. Graduated in 2015 in Law from the Libera Università Internazionale degli Studi Sociali Guido Carli in Rome, he worked as a lawyer and notary in the Republic of San Marino.

At the age of 18 he enrolled to the Sammarinese Christian Democratic Party, formerly a member of the Governing Council of this party youth movement.

Following the political elections of 11 November 2012 he became a Member of the Grand and General Council for his party and was sworn in by the Heads of State on 5 December 2012 at the age of 21 years and 212 days, becoming the youngest parliamentarian in the history of the Republic.

In the general elections of 20 November 2016, he was re-elected as a Member of the Great and General Council. On 20 December 2016, he was appointed Group Leader of the Council Group of the Christian Democratic Party of San Marino for the XVIII legislature.

== See also ==
- List of youngest state leaders since 1900
