= Italo Righi =

Captain Regent of San Marino

- Righi in 2025

Captain Regent of San Marino
- In office 1 April 2025 – 1 October 2025 Serving with Denise Bronzetti
- Preceded by: Francesca Civerchia; Dalibor Riccardi
- Succeeded by: Matteo Rossi; Lorenzo Bugli
- In office 1 April 2012 – 1 October 2012 Serving with Maurizio Rattini
- Preceded by: Matteo Fiorini; Gabriele Gatti
- Succeeded by: Teodoro Lonfernini; Denise Bronzetti

Personal details
- Born: 5 June 1959 (age 67) Sassofeltrio, Italy
- Party: Sammarinese Christian Democratic Party
- Occupation: Politician; Driving instructor

Italo Righi (born 5 June 1959) is a Sammarinese politician who has been serving as Captain Regent alongside Denise Bronzetti from 1 April to 1 October 2025. He was previously Captain Regent from 1 April 2012 to 1 October 2012, with Maurizio Rattini.

== Biography ==
Italo Righi was born on 14 June 1959 in Sassofeltrio in Italy. He joined the PDCS in 1985. From 1984 to 1994 he was a member of the council of the municipality of Montegiardino, and from 1997 to 2008 he was mayor of Montegiardino. In 2008 he was elected to the Grand and General Council, he was re-elected in the 2012 Sammarinese general election, and from April 1, 2012 to October 1, 2012, he served as a Captain Regent of San Marino alongside Maurizio Rattini. On 15 March 2025, Righi was announced to become Captain Regent once more, serving alongside Denise Bronzetti from 1 April to 1 October 2025.

From 1991 until 2024 Righi worked as a driving instructor in San Marino.
