= Denise Bronzetti =

Captain Regent of San Marino from April to October 2025

- Bronzetti in 2025

Captain Regent of San Marino
- In office 1 April 2025 – 1 October 2025 Serving with Italo Righi
- Preceded by: Francesca Civerchia; Dalibor Riccardi
- Succeeded by: Matteo Rossi; Lorenzo Bugli
- In office 1 October 2012 – 1 April 2013; Served with Teodoro Lonfernini
- Preceded by: Italo Righi; Maurizio Rattini
- Succeeded by: Denis Amici; Antonella Mularoni

Personal details
- Born: 12 December 1972 (age 53) City of San Marino, San Marino
- Party: Socialists and Democrats
- Other political affiliations: Sammarinese Socialist
- Children: 2
- Education: University of the Republic of San Marino

Denise Bronzetti (born 12 December 1972) is a Sammarinese politician who has been one of the Captains Regent of San Marino alongside Italo Righi since 2025, and a member of the Grand and General Council since 2006, as a member of the Party of Socialists and Democrats. She was one of the Captains Regent from 2012 to 2013.

== Early life ==
Denise Bronzetti was born in the City of San Marino, San Marino, on 12 December 1972. She graduated from San Marino Secondary School and the University of the Republic of San Marino.

== Career ==
From 1999 to 2002, Bronzetti was an official in FPI-CDLS and a member of the Confederal CSdL Board of Directors. She has worked for the government of San Marino since 1996, and for the Office for Labor and Active Policies since 2006. She was the private secretary to the Secretary of State for Justice, Relations with the Castle Councils and Information from 2002 to 2003.

Bronzetti joined the Sammarinese Socialist Party at age 15. In the 2006 election she won a seat in the Grand and General Council. She became the president of the Party of Socialists and Democrats (PSD) and group leader of the Noi per la Repubblica list.

Bronzetti was a member of San Marino's delegation to the Inter-Parliamentary Union in 2006, and the Parliamentary Assembly of the Organization for Security and Co-operation in Europe in 2013. From 1 October 2012 to 1 April 2013, Bronzetti was the Supreme Judiciary. She joined the Council of Twelve in 2023. She was San Marino's substitute to the Parliamentary Assembly of the Council of Europe from 22 January to 29 September 2024, and was aligned with the Socialists, Democrats and Greens Group.

From 2012 to 2013, Bronzetti was one of the Captains Regent. On 1 April 2025, she became Captain Regent for a term set to end on 1 October.

== Personal life ==
Bronzetti is married and is the mother of two children. She can speak English and French.

== Works cited ==
=== News ===
- "San Marino: Denise Bronzetti e Italo Righi eletti Capitani Reggenti per il prossimo semestre". Tribuna Politica Web. 17 March 2025. Archived from the original on 29 June 2025.

=== Web ===
- "Bronzetti, Denise". Parliamentary Assembly of the Council of Europe. Archived from the original on 29 June 2025.
- "San Marino". Inter-Parliamentary Union. Archived from the original on 29 June 2025.
- "SUA ECCELLENZA Denise Bronzetti". Captains Regent. Archived from the original on 29 June 2025.
