= List of state leaders in the 2000s =

This is a list of state leaders in the 2000s (2000–2009) AD, such as the heads of state, heads of government, or the general secretaries of single-party states.

These polities are generally sovereign states, including states with limited recognition (when recognised by at least one UN member state), but excludes minor dependent territories, whose leaders can be found listed under territorial governors in the 21st century. For completeness, these lists can include colonies, protectorates, or other dependent territories that have since gained sovereignty.

== Africa ==
=== Africa: Central ===
- Democratic People's Republic of Angola (complete list) –

- Jonas Savimbi, President (1979–2002)
- Paulo Lukamba Gato, Interim leader (2002)

- Angola

- Presidents (complete list) –

- José Eduardo dos Santos, President (1979–2017)

- Prime ministers (complete list) –

- Fernando da Piedade Dias dos Santos, Prime minister (2002–2008)
- Paulo Kassoma, Prime minister (2008–2010)

- Cameroon

- Presidents (complete list) –

- Paul Biya, President (1982–present)

- Prime ministers (complete list) –

- Peter Mafany Musonge, Prime minister (1996–2004)
- Ephraïm Inoni, Prime minister (2004–2009)
- Philémon Yang, Prime minister (2009–2019)

- Central African Republic

- Presidents (complete list) –

- Ange-Félix Patassé, President (1993–2003)
- François Bozizé, President (2003–2013)

- Prime ministers (complete list) –

- Anicet-Georges Dologuélé, Prime minister (1999–2001)
- Martin Ziguélé, Prime minister (2001–2003)
- Abel Goumba, Prime minister (2003)
- Célestin Gaombalet, Prime minister (2003–2005)
- Élie Doté, Prime minister (2005–2008)
- Faustin-Archange Touadéra, Prime minister (2008–2013)

- Chad

- Heads of state (complete list) –

- Idriss Déby, President (1990–2021)

- Prime ministers (complete list) –

- Nagoum Yamassoum, Prime minister (1999–2002)
- Haroun Kabadi, Prime minister (2002–2003)
- Moussa Faki, Prime minister (2003–2005)
- Pascal Yoadimnadji, Prime minister (2005–2007)
- Adoum Younousmi, Acting Prime minister (2007)
- Delwa Kassiré Koumakoye, Prime minister (2007–2008)
- Youssouf Saleh Abbas, Prime minister (2008–2010)

- Democratic Republic of the Congo (Kinshasa)

- Presidents (complete list) –

- Laurent-Désiré Kabila, President (1997–2001)
- Joseph Kabila, President (2001–2019)

- Prime ministers (complete list) –

- Antoine Gizenga, Prime minister (2006–2008)
- Adolphe Muzito, Prime minister (2008–2012)

- Republic of the Congo (Brazzaville)

- Presidents (complete list) –

- Denis Sassou Nguesso, President (1997–present)

- Prime ministers (complete list) –

- Isidore Mvouba, Prime minister (2005–2009)

- Equatorial Guinea

- Presidents (complete list) –

- Teodoro Obiang Nguema Mbasogo, President (1979–present)

- Prime ministers (complete list) –

- Ángel Serafín Seriche Dougan, Prime minister (1996–2001)
- Cándido Muatetema Rivas, Prime minister (2001–2004)
- Miguel Abia Biteo Boricó, Prime minister (2004–2006)
- Ricardo Mangue Obama Nfubea, Prime minister (2006–2008)
- Ignacio Milam Tang, Prime minister (2008–2012)

- Gabon

- Presidents (complete list) –

- Omar Bongo, President (1967–2009)
- Didjob Divungi Di Ndinge, Acting President (2009)
- Rose Francine Rogombé, Acting President (2009)
- Ali Bongo Ondimba, President (2009–2023)

- Prime ministers (complete list) –

- Jean-François Ntoutoume Emane, Prime minister (1999–2006)
- Jean Eyeghé Ndong, Prime minister (2006–2009)
- Paul Biyoghé Mba, Prime minister (2009–2012)

- São Tomé and Príncipe

- Presidents (complete list) –

- Miguel Trovoada, President (1991–2001)
- Fradique de Menezes, President (2001–2003)
- Fernando Pereira, Acting President (2003)
- Fradique de Menezes, President (2003–2011)

- Prime ministers (complete list) –

- Guilherme Posser da Costa, Prime minister (1999–2001)
- Evaristo Carvalho, Prime minister (2001–2002)
- Gabriel Costa, Prime minister (2002)
- Maria das Neves, Prime minister (2002–2004)
- Damião Vaz d'Almeida, Prime minister (2004–2005)
- Maria do Carmo Silveira, Prime minister (2005–2006)
- Tomé Vera Cruz, Prime minister (2006–2008)
- Patrice Trovoada, Prime minister (2008)
- Joaquim Rafael Branco, Prime minister (2008–2010)

=== Africa: East ===
- Burundi

- Presidents (complete list) –

- Pierre Buyoya, President (1996–2003)
- Domitien Ndayizeye, President (2003–2005)
- Pierre Nkurunziza, President (2005–2020)

- Comoros

- Presidents (complete list) –

- Azali Assoumani, President (1999–2001)
- Hamada Madi, Acting President (2001)
- Azali Assoumani, President (2001–2006)
- Ahmed Abdallah Mohamed Sambi, President (2006–2011)

- Prime ministers (complete list) –

- Bianrifi Tarmidi, Prime Minister (1999–2000)
- Hamada Madi, Prime minister (2000–2002)

post abolished

- Djibouti

- Presidents (complete list) –

- Ismaïl Omar Guelleh, President (1999–present)

- Prime ministers (complete list) –

- Barkat Gourad Hamadou, Prime minister (1978–2001)
- Dileita Mohamed Dileita, Prime minister (2001–2013)

- Eritrea (complete list) –

- Isaias Afwerki, President (1993–present)

- Ethiopia

- Presidents (complete list) –

- Negasso Gidada, President (1995–2001)
- Girma Wolde-Giorgis, President (2001–2013)

- Prime ministers (complete list) –

- Meles Zenawi, Prime minister (1995–2012)

- Kenya

- Presidents (complete list) –

- Daniel arap Moi, President (1978–2002)
- Mwai Kibaki, President (2002–2013)

- Prime ministers (complete list) –

- Raila Odinga, Prime minister (2008–2013)

- Madagascar

- Presidents (complete list) –

- Didier Ratsiraka, President (1997–2002)
- Marc Ravalomanana, President (2002–2009)

- Prime ministers (complete list) –

- Tantely Andrianarivo, Prime minister (1998–2002)
- Jacques Sylla, Prime minister (2002–2007)
- Charles Rabemananjara, Prime minister (2007–2009)
- Monja Roindefo, Prime minister (2009)
- Eugène Mangalaza, Prime minister (2009)
- Cécile Manorohanta, Acting Prime minister (2009)
- Albert Camille Vital, Prime minister (2009–2011)

- High Transitional Authority: Madagascar (complete list) –

- Andry Rajoelina, President (2009–2014)

- Mauritius

- Presidents (complete list) –

- Cassam Uteem, President (1992–2002)
- Angidi Chettiar, Acting President (2002)
- Ariranga Pillay, Acting President (2002)
- Karl Offmann, President (2002–2003)
- Raouf Bundhun, Acting president (2003)
- Anerood Jugnauth, President (2003–2012)

- Prime ministers (complete list) –

- Navin Ramgoolam, Prime minister (1995–2000)
- Anerood Jugnauth, Prime minister (2000–2003)
- Paul Bérenger, Prime minister (2003–2005)
- Navin Ramgoolam, Prime minister (2005–2014)

- Rwanda

- Presidents (complete list) –

- Pasteur Bizimungu, President (1994–2000)
- Paul Kagame, President (2000–present)

- Prime ministers (complete list) –

- Pierre-Célestin Rwigema, Prime minister (1995–2000)
- Bernard Makuza, Prime minister (2000–2011)

- Seychelles (complete list) –

- France-Albert René, President (1977–2004)
- James Michel, President (2004–2016)

- Transitional National Government of the Republic of Somalia

- Presidents (complete list) –

- Abdiqasim Salad Hassan, President (2000–2004)

- Prime ministers (complete list) –

- Ali Khalif Galaydh, Prime minister (2000–2001)
- Osman Jama Ali, Acting Prime minister (2001)
- Hassan Abshir Farah, Prime minister (2001–2003)
- Muhammad Abdi Yusuf, Prime minister (2003–2004)

- Transitional Federal Government of the Republic of Somalia

- Presidents (complete list) –

- Abdullahi Yusuf Ahmed, President (2004–2008)
- Adan Mohamed Nuur Madobe, Acting President (2008–2009)
- Sharif Sheikh Ahmed, President (2009–2012)

- Prime ministers (complete list) –

- Ali Mohammed Ghedi, Prime minister (2004–2007)
- Salim Aliyow Ibrow, Acting Prime minister (2007)
- Nur Hassan Hussein, Prime minister (2007–2009)
- Omar Abdirashid Ali Sharmarke, Prime minister (2009–2010)

- Republic of Somaliland (complete list) –

- Muhammad Haji Ibrahim Egal, President (1993–2002)
- Dahir Riyale Kahin, President (2002–2010)

- Tanzania

- Presidents (complete list) –

- Benjamin Mkapa, President (1995–2005)
- Jakaya Kikwete, President (2005–2015)

- Prime ministers (complete list) –

- Frederick Sumaye, Prime minister (1995–2005)
- Edward Lowassa, Prime minister (2005–2008)
- Mizengo Pinda, Prime minister (2008–2015)

- Uganda

- Presidents (complete list) –

- Yoweri Museveni, President (1986–present)

- Prime ministers (complete list) –

- Apolo Nsibambi, Prime minister (1999–2011)

=== Africa: Northcentral ===
- Libyan Arab Jamahiriya

- Heads of state (complete list) –

- Muammar Gaddafi,

- Chairman of the Revolutionary Command Council (1969–1977)
- Brotherly Leader and Guide of the Revolution (1977–2011)

- Prime ministers (complete list) –

- Muhammad Ahmad al-Mangoush, Prime minister (1997–2000)
- Imbarek Shamekh, Prime minister (2000–2003)
- Shukri Ghanem, Prime minister (2003–2006)
- Baghdadi Mahmudi, Prime minister (2006–2011)

- Tunisia

- Presidents (complete list) –

- Zine El Abidine Ben Ali, President (1987–2011)

- Prime ministers (complete list) –

- Mohamed Ghannouchi, Prime minister (1999–2011)

=== Africa: Northeast ===
- Egypt

- Presidents (complete list) –

- Hosni Mubarak, President (1981–2011)

- Prime ministers (complete list) –

- Atef Ebeid, Prime minister (1999–2004)
- Ahmed Nazif, Prime minister (2004–2011)

- Sudan

- Presidents (complete list)

- Omar al-Bashir, President (1989–2019)

=== Africa: Northwest ===
- Algeria

- Presidents (complete list) –

- Abdelaziz Bouteflika, President (1999–2019)

- Prime Ministers (complete list) –

- Ahmed Benbitour, Prime minister (1999–2000)
- Ali Benflis, Prime Minister (2000–2003)
- Ahmed Ouyahia, Prime Minister (2003–2006)
- Abdelaziz Belkhadem, Prime Minister (2006–2008)
- Ahmed Ouyahia, Prime Minister (2008–2012)

- Morocco

- Alaouite dynasty (complete list) –

- Mohammed VI, King (1999–present)

- Prime Ministers (complete list) –

- Abderrahmane Youssoufi, Prime Minister (1998–2002)
- Driss Jettou, Prime Minister (2002–2007)
- Abbas El Fassi, Prime Minister (2007–2011)

- Sahrawi Arab Democratic Republic

- Presidents (complete list) –

- Mohamed Abdelaziz, President (1976–2016)

- Prime Ministers (complete list) –

- Bouchraya Hammoudi Bayoun, Prime Minister (1999–2003)
- Abdelkader Taleb Omar, Prime Minister (2003–2018)

=== Africa: South ===
- Botswana (complete list) –

- Festus Mogae, President (1998–2008)
- Ian Khama, President (2008–2018)

- Lesotho

- Monarchs (complete list) –

- Letsie III, King (1990–1995, 1996–present)

- Prime ministers (complete list) –

- Pakalitha Mosisili, Prime minister (1998–2012)

- Malawi (complete list) –

- Bakili Muluzi, President (1994–2004)
- Bingu wa Mutharika, President (2004–2012)

- Mozambique

- Presidents (complete list) –

- Joaquim Chissano, President (1990–2005)
- Armando Guebuza, President (2005–2015)

- Prime ministers (complete list) –

- Pascoal Mocumbi, Prime minister (1994–2004)
- Luísa Diogo, Prime minister (2004–2010)

- Namibia

- Presidents (complete list) –

- Sam Nujoma, President (1990–2005)
- Hifikepunye Pohamba, President (2005–2015)

- Prime ministers (complete list) –

- Hage Geingob, Prime minister (1990–2002)
- Theo-Ben Gurirab, Prime minister (2002–2005)
- Nahas Angula, Prime minister (2005–2012)

- South Africa (complete list) –

- Thabo Mbeki, President (1999–2008)
- Ivy Matsepe-Casaburri, Acting President (2008)
- Kgalema Motlanthe, President (2008–2009)
- Jacob Zuma, President (2009–2018)

- Swaziland

- Kings (complete list) –

- Mswati III, King (1986–present)

- tiNdlovukati (complete list) –

- Ntfombi, Queen Regent (1983–1986), Ndlovukati (1983–present)

- Prime ministers (complete list) –

- Barnabas Sibusiso Dlamini, Prime minister (1996–2003)
- Paul Shabangu, Acting prime minister (2003)
- Themba Dlamini, Prime minister (2003–2008)
- Bheki Dlamini, Acting prime minister (2008)
- Barnabas Sibusiso Dlamini, Prime minister (2008–2018)

- Zambia (complete list) –

- Frederick Chiluba, President (1991–2002)
- Levy Mwanawasa, President (2002–2008)
- Rupiah Banda, President (2008–2011)

- Zimbabwe

- Presidents (complete list) –

- Robert Mugabe, President (1987–2017)

- Prime ministers (complete list) –

- Morgan Tsvangirai, Prime minister (2009–2013)

=== Africa: West ===
- Benin

- Presidents (complete list) –

- Mathieu Kérékou, President (1996–2006)
- Thomas Boni Yayi, President (2006–2016)

- Burkina Faso

- Presidents (complete list) –

- Blaise Compaoré, President (1987–2014)

- Prime ministers (complete list) –

- Kadré Désiré Ouedraogo, Prime minister (1996–2000)
- Paramanga Ernest Yonli, Prime minister (2000–2007)
- Tertius Zongo, Prime minister (2007–2011)

- Cape Verde

- Presidents (complete list) –

- António Mascarenhas Monteiro, President (1991–2001)
- Pedro Pires, President (2001–2011)

- Prime ministers (complete list) –

- Carlos Veiga, Prime minister (1991–2000)
- Gualberto do Rosário, Prime minister (2000–2001)
- José Maria Neves, Prime minister (2001–2016)

- Gambia (complete list) –

- Yahya Jammeh, Chairman of the Armed Forces Provisional Ruling Council (1994–1996), President (1996–2017)

- Ghana (complete list) –

- Jerry Rawlings, Military head of state (1981–1993), President (1993–2001)
- John Kufuor, President (2001–2009)
- John Atta Mills, President (2009–2012)

- Guinea

- Presidents (complete list) –

- Lansana Conté, President (1984–2008)
- Moussa Dadis Camara, President (2008–2009)
- Sékouba Konaté, Acting President (2009–2010)

- Prime ministers (complete list) –

- Lamine Sidimé, Prime minister (1999–2004)
- François Lonseny Fall, Prime minister (2004)
- Cellou Dalein Diallo, Prime minister (2004–2006)
- Eugène Camara, Prime minister (2007)
- Lansana Kouyaté, Prime minister (2007–2008)
- Ahmed Tidiane Souaré, Prime minister (2008)
- Kabiné Komara, Prime minister (2008–2010)

- Guinea-Bissau

- Presidents (complete list) –

- Malam Bacai Sanhá, Acting President (1999–2000)
- Kumba Ialá, President (2000–2003)
- Veríssimo Correia Seabra, Chairman of the Military Committee (2003)
- Henrique Rosa, Acting President (2003–2005)
- João Bernardo Vieira, President (2005–2009)
- Raimundo Pereira, Acting President (2009)
- Malam Bacai Sanhá, President (2009–2012)

- Prime ministers (complete list) –

- Francisco Fadul, Prime minister (1998–2000)
- Caetano N'Tchama, Prime minister (2000–2001)
- Faustino Imbali, Prime minister (2001)
- Alamara Nhassé, Prime minister (2001–2002)
- Mário Pires, Prime minister (2002–2003)
- Artur Sanhá, Prime minister (2003–2004)
- Carlos Gomes Júnior, Prime minister (2004–2005)
- Aristides Gomes, Prime minister (2005–2007)
- Martinho Ndafa Kabi, Prime minister (2007–2008)
- Carlos Correia, Prime minister (2008–2009)
- Carlos Gomes Júnior, Prime minister (2009–2012)

- Ivory Coast

- Presidents (complete list) –

- Robert Guéï, President (1999–2000)
- Laurent Gbagbo, President (2000–2011)

- Prime ministers (complete list) –

- Pascal Affi N'Guessan, Prime minister (2000–2003)
- Seydou Diarra, Prime minister (2003–2005)
- Charles Konan Banny, Prime minister (2005–2007)
- Guillaume Soro, Prime minister (2007–2012)

- Liberia (complete list) –

- Charles Taylor, President (1997–2003)
- Moses Blah, President (2003)
- Gyude Bryant, Chairman of the National Transitional Government (2003–2006)
- Ellen Johnson Sirleaf, President (2006–2018)

- Mali

- Presidents (complete list) –

- Alpha Oumar Konaré, President (1992–2002)
- Amadou Toumani Touré, President (2002–2012)

- Prime ministers (complete list) –

- Ibrahim Boubacar Keïta, Prime minister (1994–2000)
- Mandé Sidibé, Prime minister (2000–2002)
- Modibo Keita, Prime minister (2002)
- Ahmed Mohamed ag Hamani, Prime minister (2002–2004)
- Ousmane Issoufi Maïga, Prime minister (2004–2007)
- Modibo Sidibé, Prime minister (2007–2011)

- Mauritania

- Presidents (complete list) –

- Maaouya Ould Sid'Ahmed Taya, President (1984–2005)
- Ely Ould Mohamed Vall, Chairman of the Military Council (2005–2007)
- Sidi Ould Cheikh Abdallahi, President (2007–2008)
- Mohamed Ould Abdel Aziz, Acting President (2008–2009)
- Ba Mamadou Mbaré, Acting President (2009)
- Mohamed Ould Abdel Aziz, President (2009–2019)

- Prime ministers (complete list) –

- Cheikh El Avia Ould Mohamed Khouna, Prime minister (1998–2003)
- Sghair Ould M'Bareck, Prime minister (2003–2005)
- Sidi Mohamed Ould Boubacar, Prime minister (2005–2007)
- Zeine Ould Zeidane, Prime minister (2007–2008)
- Yahya Ould Ahmed El Waghef, Prime minister (2008)
- Moulaye Ould Mohamed Laghdaf, Prime minister (2008–2014)

- Niger

- Presidents (complete list) –

- Mamadou Tandja, President (1999–2010)

- Prime ministers (complete list) –

- Ibrahim Hassane Mayaki, Prime minister (1997–2000)
- Hama Amadou, Prime minister (2000–2007)
- Seyni Oumarou, Prime minister (2007–2009)
- Albadé Abouba, Acting Prime minister (2009)
- Ali Badjo Gamatié, Prime minister (2009–2010)

- Nigeria: Fourth Republic (complete list) –

- Olusegun Obasanjo, President (1999–2007)
- Umaru Musa Yar'Adua, President (2007–2010)

- Senegal

- Presidents (complete list) –

- Abdou Diouf, President (1981–2000)
- Abdoulaye Wade, President (2000–2012)

- Prime ministers (complete list) –

- Mamadou Lamine Loum, Prime minister (1998–2000)
- Moustapha Niasse, Prime minister (2000–2001)
- Mame Madior Boye, Prime minister (2001–2002)
- Idrissa Seck, Prime minister (2002–2004)
- Macky Sall, Prime minister (2004–2007)
- Cheikh Hadjibou Soumaré, Prime minister (2007–2009)
- Souleymane Ndéné Ndiaye, Prime minister (2009–2012)

- Sierra Leone

- Presidents (complete list) –

- Ahmad Tejan Kabbah, President (1998–2007)
- Ernest Bai Koroma, President (2007–2018)

- Togo

- Presidents (complete list) –

- Gnassingbé Eyadéma, President (1967–2005)
- Faure Gnassingbé, President (2005)
- Bonfoh Abass, Interim President (2005)
- Faure Gnassingbé, President (2005–2025)

- Prime ministers (complete list) –

- Eugène Koffi Adoboli, Prime minister (1999–2000)
- Agbéyomé Kodjo, Prime minister (2000–2002)
- Koffi Sama, Prime minister (2002–2005)
- Edem Kodjo, Prime minister (2005–2006)
- Yawovi Agboyibo, Prime minister (2006–2007)
- Komlan Mally, Prime minister (2007–2008)
- Gilbert Houngbo, Prime minister (2008–2012)

== Americas ==
=== Americas: Caribbean and Lucayan ===
- Antigua and Barbuda

- Monarchs (complete list) –

- Elizabeth II, Queen (1981–2022)

- Prime ministers (complete list) –

- Lester Bird, Prime minister (1994–2004)
- Baldwin Spencer, Prime minister (2004–2014)

- Aruba (complete list) –

Constituent country 2010–present
For details see the Netherlands under western Europe

- Bahamas

- Monarchs (complete list) –

- Elizabeth II, Queen (1973–2022)

- Prime ministers (complete list) –

- Hubert Ingraham, Prime minister (1992–2002)
- Perry Christie, Prime minister (2002–2007)
- Hubert Ingraham, Prime minister (2007–2012)

- Barbados

- Monarchs (complete list) –

- Elizabeth II, Queen (1966–2021)

- Prime ministers (complete list) –

- Owen Arthur, Prime minister (1994–2008)
- David Thompson, Prime minister (2008–2010)

- Cuba

- First Secretaries of the Communist Party of Cuba

- Fidel Castro, First secretary (1965–2011)

- Presidents (complete list) –

- Fidel Castro, President of the State Council (1976–2008)
- Raúl Castro, President of the State Council (2008–2018)

- Heads of government (complete list) –

- Fidel Castro, Prime minister (1959–1976), President of the Council of Ministers (1976–2008)
- Raúl Castro, President of the Council of Ministers (2008–2018)

- Curaçao (complete list) –

Constituent country 2010–present
For details see the Netherlands under western Europe

- Dominica

- Presidents (complete list) –

- Vernon Shaw, President (1998–2003)
- Nicholas Liverpool, President (2003–2012)

- Prime ministers (complete list) –

- Pierre Charles, Prime minister (2000–2004)
- Osborne Riviere, Acting President (2004)
- Roosevelt Skerrit, Prime minister (2004–present)

- Dominican Republic (complete list) –

- Leonel Fernández, President (1996–2000)
- Hipólito Mejía, President (2000–2004)
- Leonel Fernández, President (2004–2012)

- Grenada

- Monarchs (complete list) –

- Elizabeth II, Queen (1974–2022)

- Prime ministers (complete list) –

- Keith Mitchell, Prime minister (1995–2008)
- Tillman Thomas, Prime minister (2008–2013)

- Haiti

- Heads of state (complete list) –

- René Préval, President (1996–2001)
- Jean-Bertrand Aristide, President (2001–2004)
- Boniface Alexandre, Provisional President (2004–2006)
- René Préval, President (2006–2011)

- Prime ministers (complete list) –

- Jacques-Édouard Alexis, Prime minister (1999–2001)
- Jean Marie Chérestal, Prime minister (2001–2002)
- Yvon Neptune, Prime minister (2002–2004)
- Gérard Latortue, Prime minister (2004–2006)
- Jacques-Édouard Alexis, Prime minister (2006–2008)
- Michèle Pierre-Louis, Prime minister (2008–2009)
- Jean-Max Bellerive, Prime minister (2009–2011)

- Jamaica

- Monarchs (complete list) –

- Elizabeth II, Queen (1962–2022)

- Prime ministers (complete list) –

- P. J. Patterson, Prime minister (1992–2006)
- Portia Simpson-Miller, Prime minister (2006–2007)
- Bruce Golding, Prime minister (2007–2011)

- Netherlands Antilles (complete list) –

Constituent country 1954–2010
For details see the Netherlands under western Europe

- Saint Kitts and Nevis

- Monarchs (complete list) –

- Elizabeth II, Queen (1983–2022)

- Prime ministers (complete list) –

- Denzil Douglas, Prime minister (1995–2015)

- Saint Lucia

- Monarchs (complete list) –

- Elizabeth II, Queen (1979–2022)

- Prime ministers (complete list) –

- Kenny Anthony, Prime minister (1997–2006)
- John Compton, Prime minister (2006–2007)
- Stephenson King, Prime minister (2007–2011)

- Sint Maarten (complete list) –

Constituent country 2010–present
For details see the Netherlands under western Europe

- Saint Vincent and the Grenadines

- Monarchs (complete list) –

- Elizabeth II, Queen (1979–2022)

- Prime ministers (complete list) –

- James Fitz-Allen Mitchell, Prime minister (1984–2000)
- Arnhim Eustace, Prime minister (2000–2001)
- Ralph Gonsalves, Prime minister (2001–2025)

- Trinidad and Tobago

- Presidents (complete list) –

- A. N. R. Robinson, President (1997–2003)
- George Maxwell Richards, President (2003–2013)

- Prime ministers (complete list) –

- Basdeo Panday, Prime minister (1995–2001)
- Patrick Manning, Prime minister (2001–2010)

=== Americas: Central ===
- Belize

- Monarchs (complete list) –

- Elizabeth II, Queen (1981–2022)

- Prime ministers (complete list) –

- Said Musa, Prime minister (1998–2008)
- Dean Barrow, Prime minister (2008–2020)

- Costa Rica (complete list) –

- Miguel Rodríguez Echeverría, President (1998–2002)
- Abel Pacheco de la Espriella, President (2002–2006)
- Óscar Arias, President (2006–2010)

- El Salvador (complete list) –

- Francisco Flores Pérez, President (1999–2004)
- Antonio Saca, President (2004–2009)
- Mauricio Funes, President (2009–2014)

- Guatemala (complete list) –

- Álvaro Arzú, President (1996–2000)
- Alfonso Portillo, President (2000–2004)
- Óscar Berger, President (2004–2008)
- Álvaro Colom, President (2008–2012)

- Honduras (complete list) –

- Carlos Roberto Flores, President (1998–2002)
- Ricardo Maduro, President (2002–2006)
- Manuel Zelaya, President (2006–2009)
- Roberto Micheletti, Acting President (2009–2010)

- Nicaragua (complete list) –

- Arnoldo Alemán, President (1997–2002)
- Enrique Bolaños, President (2002–2007)
- Daniel Ortega, President (2007–present)

- Panama (complete list) –

- Mireya Moscoso, President (1999–2004)
- Martín Torrijos, President (2004–2009)
- Ricardo Martinelli, President (2009–2014)

=== Americas: North ===
- Canada

- Monarchs (complete list) –

- Elizabeth II, Queen (1952–2022)

- Prime ministers (complete list) –

- Jean Chrétien, Prime minister (1993–2003)
- Paul Martin, Prime minister (2003–2006)
- Stephen Harper, Prime minister (2006–2015)

- Mexico (complete list) –

- Ernesto Zedillo, President (1994–2000)
- Vicente Fox, President (2000–2006)
- Felipe Calderón, President (2006–2012)

- United States (complete list) –

- Bill Clinton, President (1993–2001)
- George W. Bush, President (2001–2009)
- Barack Obama, President (2009–2017)

=== Americas: South ===
- Argentina (complete list) –

- Fernando de la Rúa, President (1999–2001)
- Adolfo Rodríguez Saá, President (2001)
- Eduardo Duhalde, President (2002–2003)
- Néstor Kirchner, President (2003–2007)
- Cristina Fernández de Kirchner, President (2007–2015)

- Bolivia (complete list) –

- Hugo Banzer, President (1997–2001)
- Jorge Quiroga, President (2001–2002)
- Gonzalo Sánchez de Lozada, President (2002–2003)
- Carlos Mesa, President (2003–2005)
- Eduardo Rodríguez, President (2005–2006)
- Evo Morales, President (2006–2019)

- Brazil (complete list) –

- Fernando Henrique Cardoso, President (1995–2003)
- Luiz Inácio Lula da Silva, President (2003–2011)

- Chile (complete list) –

- Eduardo Frei Ruiz-Tagle, President (1994–2000)
- Ricardo Lagos, President (2000–2006)
- Michelle Bachelet, President (2006–2010)

- Colombia (complete list) –

- Andrés Pastrana Arango, President (1998–2002)
- Álvaro Uribe Vélez, President (2002–2010)

- Ecuador (complete list) –

- Jamil Mahuad, President (1998–2000)
- Gustavo Noboa, President (2000–2003)
- Lucio Gutiérrez, President (2003–2005)
- Alfredo Palacio, President (2005–2007)
- Rafael Correa, President (2007–2017)

- Guyana

- Presidents (complete list) –

- Bharrat Jagdeo, President (1999–2011)

- Prime ministers (complete list) –

- Sam Hinds, Prime minister (1999–2015)

- Paraguay (complete list) –

- Luis González, President (1999–2003)
- Nicanor Duarte, President (2003–2008)
- Fernando Lugo, President (2008–2012)

- Peru

- Presidents (complete list) –

- Alberto Fujimori, Constitutional President (1990–1992), de facto President (1992–1995), Constitutional President (1995–2000)
- Valentín Paniagua, President of Transition Government (2000–2001)
- Alejandro Toledo, Constitutional President (2001–2006)
- Alan García Pérez, Constitutional President (2006–2011)

- Prime minister (complete list) –

- Alberto Bustamante Belaúnde, Prime Minister (1999–2000)
- Federico Salas, Prime Minister (2000)
- Javier Pérez de Cuéllar, Prime Minister (2000–2001)
- Roberto Dañino, Prime Minister (2001–2002)
- Luis Solari De La Fuente, Prime Minister (2002–2003)
- Beatriz Merino, Prime Minister (2003)
- Carlos Ferrero, Prime Minister (2003–2005)
- Pedro Pablo Kuczynski, Prime Minister (2005–2006)
- Jorge Del Castillo, Prime Minister (2006–2008)
- Yehude Simon, Prime Minister (2008–2009)
- Javier Velásquez, Prime Minister (2009–2010)

- Suriname (complete list) –

- Jules Wijdenbosch, President (1996–2000)
- Ronald Venetiaan, President (2000–2010)

- Uruguay (complete list) –

- Julio María Sanguinetti, President (1995–2000)
- Jorge Batlle, President (2000–2005)
- Tabaré Vázquez, President (2005–2010)

- Bolivarian Republic of Venezuela (complete list) –

- Hugo Chávez, President (1999–2002, 2002–2013)
- Pedro Carmona, Acting President (2002)
- Diosdado Cabello, Acting President (2002)

== Asia ==
=== Asia: Central ===
- Kazakhstan

- Presidents (complete list) –

- Nursultan Nazarbayev, President (1991–2019)

- Prime ministers (complete list) –

- Kassym-Jomart Tokayev, Prime minister (1999–2002)
- Imangali Tasmagambetov, Prime minister (2002–2003)
- Daniyal Akhmetov, Prime minister (2003–2007)
- Karim Massimov, Prime minister (2007–2012)

- Kyrgyzstan

- Presidents (complete list) –

- Askar Akayev, President (1990–2005)
- Ishenbai Kadyrbekov, Acting President (2005)
- Kurmanbek Bakiyev, President (2005–2010)

- Prime ministers (complete list) –

- Amangeldy Muraliyev, Prime minister (1999–2000)
- Kurmanbek Bakiyev, Prime minister (2000–2002)
- Nikolai Tanayev, Prime minister (2002–2005)
- Kurmanbek Bakiyev, Prime minister (2005)
- Medetbek Kerimkulov, Acting Prime minister (2005)
- Felix Kulov, Acting Prime minister (2005–2007)
- Azim Isabekov, Prime minister (2007)
- Almazbek Atambayev, Prime minister (2007)
- Iskenderbek Aidaraliyev, Acting Prime minister (2007)
- Igor Chudinov, Prime minister (2007–2009)
- Daniar Usenov, Prime minister (2009–2010)

- Tajikistan

- Presidents (complete list) –

- Emomali Rahmon, Chairman of the Supreme Assembly (1992–1994), President (1994–present)

- Prime ministers (complete list) –

- Oqil Oqilov, Prime minister (1999–2013)

- Turkmenistan (complete list) –

- Saparmurat Niyazov, President (1990–2006)
- Gurbanguly Berdimuhamedow, Acting President (2006–2007), President (2007–2022)

- Uzbekistan

- Presidents (complete list) –

- Islam Karimov, President (1991–2016)

- Prime ministers (complete list) –

- Oʻtkir Sultonov, Prime minister (1995–2003)
- Shavkat Mirziyoyev, Prime minister (2003–2016)

=== Asia: East ===
- China

- Chairmen and General Secretaries of the Communist Party (complete list) and paramount leaders (complete list) –

- Jiang Zemin, General Secretary (1989–2002), paramount leader (1989–2002)
- Hu Jintao, General Secretary (2002–2012), paramount leader (2002–2012)

- Heads of state (complete list) –

- Jiang Zemin, President (1993–2003)
- Hu Jintao, President (2003–2013)

- Premiers (complete list) –

- Zhu Rongji, Premier (1998–2003)
- Wen Jiabao, Premier (2003–2013)

- Japan

- Emperors (complete list) –

- Akihito, Emperor (1989–2019)

- Prime ministers (complete list) –

- Keizō Obuchi, Prime minister (1998–2000)
- Mikio Aoki, Acting Prime minister (2000)
- Yoshirō Mori, Prime minister (2000–2001)
- Junichirō Koizumi, Prime minister (2001–2006)
- Shinzō Abe, Prime minister (2006–2007)
- Yasuo Fukuda, Prime minister (2007–2008)
- Tarō Asō, Prime minister (2008–2009)
- Yukio Hatoyama, Prime minister (2009–2010)

- North Korea

- Leaders of the Workers' Party (complete list) –

- Kim Jong-il, General Secretary (1997–2011), Eternal General Secretary (2012–present)

- Head of state

- Kim Yong-nam (1998–2019)

- Premiers (complete list) –

- Hong Song-nam, Premier (1997–2003)
- Pak Pong-ju, Premier (2003–2007)
- Kim Yong-il, Premier (2007–2010)

- South Korea

- Presidents (complete list) –

- Kim Dae-jung, President (1998–2003)
- Roh Moo-hyun, President (2003–2008)
- Goh Kun, Acting President (2004)
- Lee Myung-bak, President (2008–2013)

- Prime ministers (complete list) –

- Kim Jong-pil, Prime minister (1998–2000)
- Park Tae-joon, Prime minister (2000)
- Lee Han-dong, Prime minister (2000–2002)
- Chang Sang, Acting Prime minister (2002)
- Chang Dae-whan, Acting Prime minister (2002)
- Kim Suk-soo, Prime minister (2002–2003)
- Goh Kun, Prime minister (2003–2004)
- Lee Hae-chan, Prime minister (2004–2006)
- Han Myeong-sook, Prime minister (2006–2007)
- Han Duck-soo, Prime minister (2007–2008)
- Han Seung-soo, Prime minister (2008–2009)
- Chung Un-chan, Prime minister (2009–2010)

- Mongolia

- Presidents (complete list) –

- Natsagiin Bagabandi, President (1997–2005)
- Nambaryn Enkhbayar, President (2005–2009)
- Tsakhiagiin Elbegdorj, President (2009–2017)

- Prime ministers (complete list) –

- Rinchinnyamyn Amarjargal, Prime minister (1999–2000)
- Nambaryn Enkhbayar, Prime minister (2000–2004)
- Tsakhiagiin Elbegdorj, Prime minister (2004–2006)
- Miyeegombyn Enkhbold, Prime minister (2006–2007)
- Sanjaagiin Bayar, Prime minister (2007–2009)
- Sükhbaataryn Batbold, Prime minister (2009–2012)

- Taiwan

- Presidents (complete list) –

- Lee Teng-hui, President (1988–2000)
- Chen Shui-bian, President (2000–2008)
- Ma Ying-jeou, President (2008–2016)

- Premiers (complete list) –

- Vincent Siew, Premier (1997–2000)
- Tang Fei, Premier (2000)
- Chang Chun-hsiung, Premier (2000–2002)
- Yu Shyi-kun, Premier (2002–2005)
- Frank Hsieh, Premier (2005–2006)
- Su Tseng-chang, Premier (2006–2007)
- Chang Chun-hsiung, Premier (2007–2008)
- Liu Chao-shiuan, Premier (2008–2009)
- Wu Den-yih, Premier (2009–2012)

=== Asia: Southeast ===
- Brunei (complete list) –

- Hassanal Bolkiah, Sultan (1967–present) (Note: Hassanal Bolkiah did not become a state leader until Brunei's independence in 1984.)

- Cambodia

- Kings (complete list) –

- Norodom Sihanouk, King (1993–2004)
- Norodom Sihamoni, King (2004–present)

- Prime ministers (complete list) –

- Hun Sen, Prime minister (1998–2023)

- Indonesia (complete list) –

- Abdurrahman Wahid, President (1999–2001)
- Megawati Sukarnoputri, President (2001–2004)
- Susilo Bambang Yudhoyono, President (2004–2014)

- Laos

- General Secretaries (complete list) –

- Khamtai Siphandone, Chairman (1992–2006)
- Choummaly Sayasone, General Secretary (2006–2016)

- Presidents (complete list) –

- Khamtai Siphandone, President (1998–2006)
- Choummaly Sayasone, President (2006–2016)

- Prime ministers (complete list) –

- Sisavath Keobounphanh, Prime minister (1998–2001)
- Bounnhang Vorachit, Prime minister (2001–2006)
- Bouasone Bouphavanh, Prime minister (2006–2010)

- Malaysia

- Elected monarchs (complete list) –

- Salahuddin of Selangor, Yang di-Pertuan Agong (1999–2001)
- Sirajuddin of Perlis, Yang di-Pertuan Agong (2001–2006)
- Mizan Zainal Abidin of Terengganu, Yang di-Pertuan Agong (2006–2011)

- Prime ministers (complete list) –

- Mahathir Mohamad, Prime minister (1981–2003)
- Abdullah Ahmad Badawi, Prime minister (2003–2009)
- Najib Razak, Prime minister (2009–2018)

- Burma/Myanmar: State Peace and Development Council (1997–2011)

- Heads of state (complete list) –

- Than Shwe, Chairman (1992–2011)

- Prime ministers (complete list) –

- Than Shwe, Prime minister (1992–2003)
- Khin Nyunt, Prime minister (2003–2004)
- Soe Win, Prime minister (2004–2007)
- Thein Sein, Prime minister (2007–2011)

- Philippines

- Presidents (complete list) –

- Joseph Estrada, President (1998–2001)
- Gloria Macapagal Arroyo, President (2001–2010)

- Singapore

- Presidents (complete list) –

- S. R. Nathan, President (1999–2011)

- Prime ministers (complete list) –

- Goh Chok Tong, Prime minister (1990–2004)
- Lee Hsien Loong, Prime minister (2004–2024)

- Thailand

- Monarchs (complete list) –

- Bhumibol Adulyadej, King (1946–2016)

- Prime ministers (complete list) –

- Chuan Leekpai, Prime minister (1997–2001)
- Thaksin Shinawatra, Prime minister (2001–2006)
- Chitchai Wannasathit, Acting Prime minister (2006)
- Thaksin Shinawatra, Prime minister (2006)
- Sonthi Boonyaratglin, President of the Administrative Reform Council of Thailand (2006)
- Surayud Chulanont, Prime minister (2006–2008)
- Samak Sundaravej, Prime minister (2008)
- Somchai Wongsawat, Prime minister (2008)
- Chaovarat Chanweerakul, Acting Prime minister (2008)
- Abhisit Vejjajiva, Prime minister (2008–2011)

- Timor-Leste (independent 2002–present)

- Presidents (complete list) –

- Xanana Gusmão, President (2002–2007)
- José Ramos-Horta, President (2007–2008)
- Vicente Guterres, Acting President (2008)
- Fernando de Araújo, Acting President (2008)
- José Ramos-Horta, President (2008–2012)

- Prime ministers (complete list) –

- Mari Alkatiri, Prime minister (2002–2006)
- José Ramos-Horta, Prime minister (2006–2007)
- Estanislau da Silva, Prime minister (2007)
- Xanana Gusmão, Prime minister (2007–2015)

- Vietnam

- General Secretaries of the Communist Party (complete list) –

- Lê Khả Phiêu, General Secretary (1997–2001)
- Nông Đức Mạnh, General Secretary (2001–2011)

- Presidents (complete list) –

- Trần Đức Lương, President (1997–2006)
- Nguyễn Minh Triết, President (2006–2011)

- Prime ministers (complete list) –

- Phan Văn Khải, Prime minister (1997–2006)
- Nguyễn Tấn Dũng, Prime minister (2006–2016)

=== Asia: South ===
- Islamic State of Afghanistan

- Presidents (complete list) –

- Burhanuddin Rabbani, President (1992–2001)
- Hamid Karzai, Chairman of the Afghan Interim Administration (2001–2002)

- Islamic Emirate of Afghanistan

- Supreme leaders (complete list) –

- Mullah Omar (1996–2001)

- Prime ministers –

- Mohammad Rabbani (1996–2001)
- Abdul Kabir (acting, 2001)

- Transitional Islamic State of Afghanistan

- Presidents (complete list) –

- Hamid Karzai, President (2002–2004)

- Islamic Republic of Afghanistan

- Presidents (complete list) –

- Hamid Karzai, President (2004–2014)

- Bangladesh

- Presidents (complete list) –

- Shahabuddin Ahmed, President (1996–2001)
- A. Q. M. Badruddoza Chowdhury, President (2001–2002)
- Muhammad Jamiruddin Sircar, Interim President (2002)
- Iajuddin Ahmed, President (2002–2009)
- Zillur Rahman, President (2009–2013)

- Prime ministers and Chief advisers (complete list) –

- Sheikh Hasina, Prime minister (1996–2001)
- Latifur Rahman, Chief adviser (2001)
- Khaleda Zia, Prime minister (2001–2006)
- Iajuddin Ahmed, Chief adviser (2006–2007)
- Fazlul Haque, Acting Chief adviser (2007)
- Fakhruddin Ahmed, Chief adviser (2007–2009)
- Sheikh Hasina, Prime minister (2009–2024)

- Bhutan

- Monarchs (complete list) –

- Jigme Singye Wangchuck, Druk Gyalpo (1972–2006)
- Jigme Khesar Namgyel Wangchuck, Druk Gyalpo (2006–present)

- Prime ministers (complete list) –

- Sangay Ngedup, Prime minister (1999–2000)
- Yeshey Zimba, Prime minister (2000–2001)
- Khandu Wangchuk, Prime minister (2001–2002)
- Kinzang Dorji, Prime minister (2002–2003)
- Jigme Thinley, Prime minister (2003–2004)
- Yeshey Zimba, Prime minister (2004–2005)
- Sangay Ngedup, Prime minister (2005–2006)
- Khandu Wangchuk, Prime minister (2006–2007)
- Kinzang Dorji, Prime minister (2007–2008)
- Jigme Thinley, Prime minister (2008–2013)

- India

- Presidents (complete list) –

- K. R. Narayanan, President (1997–2002)
- A. P. J. Abdul Kalam, President (2002–2007)
- Pratibha Patil, President (2007–2012)

- Prime ministers (complete list) –

- Atal Bihari Vajpayee, Prime minister (1998–2004)
- Manmohan Singh, Prime minister (2004–2014)

- Maldives (complete list) –

- Maumoon Abdul Gayoom, President (1978–2008)
- Mohamed Nasheed, President (2008–2012)

- Kingdom of Nepal

- Kings (complete list) –

- Birendra, King (1972–2001)
- Dipendra, King (2001)
- Gyanendra, King (2001–2008)

- Prime ministers (complete list) –

- Krishna Prasad Bhattarai, Prime minister (1999–2000)
- Girija Prasad Koirala, Prime minister (2000–2001)
- Sher Bahadur Deuba, Prime minister (2001–2002)
- Lokendra Bahadur Chand, Prime minister (2002–2003)
- Surya Bahadur Thapa, Prime minister (2003–2004)
- Sher Bahadur Deuba, Prime minister (2004–2005)
- Girija Prasad Koirala, Prime minister (2006–2008)

- Federal Democratic Republic of Nepal

- Presidents (complete list) –

- Girija Prasad Koirala, Acting President (2007–2008)
- Ram Baran Yadav, President (2008–2015)

- Prime ministers (complete list) –

- Girija Prasad Koirala, Prime minister (2008)
- Pushpa Kamal Dahal, Prime minister (2008–2009)
- Madhav Kumar Nepal, Prime minister (2009–2011)

- Pakistan

- Presidents (complete list) –

- Muhammad Rafiq Tarar, President (1997–2001)
- Pervez Musharraf, President (2001–2008)
- Muhammad Mian Soomro, Acting President (2008)
- Asif Ali Zardari, President (2008–2013)

- Prime ministers (complete list) –

- Zafarullah Khan Jamali, Prime minister (2002–2004)
- Chaudhry Shujaat Hussain, Prime minister (2004)
- Shaukat Aziz, Prime minister (2004–2007)
- Muhammad Mian Soomro, Acting Prime minister (2007–2008)
- Yousaf Raza Gillani, Prime minister (2008–2012)

- Sri Lanka

- Presidents (complete list) –

- Chandrika Kumaratunga, President (1994–2005)
- Mahinda Rajapaksa, President (2005–2015)

- Prime ministers (complete list) –

- Sirimavo Bandaranaike, Prime minister (1994–2000)
- Ratnasiri Wickremanayake, Prime minister (2000–2001)
- Ranil Wickremesinghe, Prime minister (2001–2004)
- Mahinda Rajapaksa, Prime minister (2004–2005)
- Ratnasiri Wickremanayake, Prime minister (2005–2010)

=== Asia: West ===
- State/ Kingdom of Bahrain

- Monarchs (complete list) –

- Hamad bin Isa Al Khalifa, Emir (1999–2002), King (2002–present)

- Prime ministers (complete list) –

- Khalifa bin Salman Al Khalifa, Prime minister (1971–2020)

- Cyprus (complete list) –

- Glafcos Clerides, President (1993–2003)
- Tassos Papadopoulos, President (2003–2008)
- Demetris Christofias, President (2008–2013)

- Northern Cyprus

- Presidents (complete list) –

- Rauf Denktaş, President (1983–2005)
- Mehmet Ali Talat, President (2005–2010)

- Prime ministers (complete list) –

- Derviş Eroğlu, Prime minister (1985–1994, 1996–2004, 2009–2010))
- Mehmet Ali Talat, Prime minister (2004–2005)
- Serdar Denktaş, acting Prime minister (2005)
- Ferdi Sabit Soyer, Prime minister (2005–2009)

- Iran

- Supreme Leaders (complete list) –

- Ali Khamenei, Supreme Leader (1989–2026)

- Presidents (complete list) –

- Mohammad Khatami, President (1997–2005)
- Mahmoud Ahmadinejad, President (2005–2013)

- Ba'athist Iraq

- Presidents (complete list) –

- Saddam Hussein, President (1979–2003)

- Prime ministers (complete list) –

- Saddam Hussein, Prime minister (1994–2003)

- Coalition Provisional Authority of Iraq

- Administrators –

- Jay Garner, Administrator of the Coalition Provisional Authority (2003)
- Paul Bremer, Administrator of the Coalition Provisional Authority (2003–2004)

- Prime ministers (complete list) –

- Mohammad Bahr al-Ulloum, Acting Prime minister (2003)
- Ibrahim al-Jaafari, Prime minister (2003)
- Ahmed al-Chalabi, Prime minister (2003)
- Ayad Allawi, Prime minister (2003)
- Jalal Talabani, Prime minister (2003)
- Abdul Aziz al-Hakim, Prime minister (2003)
- Adnan al-Pachachi, Prime minister (2004)
- Mohsen Abdel Hamid, Prime minister (2004)
- Mohammad Bahr al-Ulloum, Prime minister (2004)
- Massoud Barzani, Prime minister (2004)
- Ezzedine Salim, Prime minister (2004)
- Ghazi Mashal Ajil al-Yawer, Prime minister (2004)

- Republic of Iraq

- Presidents (complete list) –

- Ghazi Mashal Ajil al-Yawer, Interim President (2004–2005)
- Jalal Talabani, President (2005–2014)

- Prime ministers (complete list) –

- Ayad Allawi, Acting Prime minister (2004–2005)
- Ibrahim al-Jaafari, Prime minister (2005–2006)
- Nouri al-Maliki, Prime minister (2006–2014)

- Israel

- Heads of state (complete list) –

- Ezer Weizman, President (1993–2000)
- Moshe Katsav, President (2000–2007)
- Shimon Peres, President (2007–2014)

- Prime ministers (complete list) –

- Ehud Barak, Prime minister (1999–2001)
- Ariel Sharon, Prime minister (2001–2006)
- Ehud Olmert, Prime minister (2006–2009)
- Benjamin Netanyahu, Prime minister (2009–2021)

- Jordan

- Kings (complete list) –

- Abdullah II, King (1999–present)

- Prime ministers (complete list) –

- Abdelraouf al-Rawabdeh, Prime minister (1999–2000)
- Ali Abu al-Ragheb, Prime minister (2000–2003)
- Faisal al-Fayez, Prime minister (2003–2005)
- Adnan Badran, Prime minister (2005)
- Marouf al-Bakhit, Prime minister (2005–2007)
- Nader al-Dahabi, Prime minister (2007–2009)
- Samir Rifai, Prime minister (2009–2011)

- Kuwait

- Monarchs (complete list) –

- Jaber III, Emir (1977–2006)
- Saad I, Emir (2006)
- Sabah IV, Emir (2006–2020)

- Prime ministers (complete list) –

- Saad Al-Abdullah, Prime minister (1978–2003)
- Sabah Al-Ahmad, Prime minister (2003–2006)
- Nasser Al-Mohammed, Prime minister (2006–2011)

- Lebanon

- Presidents (complete list) –

- Émile Lahoud, President (1998–2007)
- Fouad Siniora, Acting President (2007–2008)
- Michel Suleiman, President (2008–2014)

- Prime ministers (complete list) –

- Selim Hoss, Prime minister (1998–2000)
- Rafic Hariri, Prime minister (2000–2004)
- Omar Karami, Prime minister (2004–2005)
- Najib Mikati, Primeln minister (2005)
- Fouad Siniora, Prime minister (2005–2009)
- Saad Hariri, Prime minister (2009–2011)

- Oman (complete list) –

- Qaboos bin Said, Sultan (1970–2020)

- State of Palestine

- Presidents (complete list) –

- Yasser Arafat, President (1994–2004)
- Mahmoud Abbas, Acting President (2005–2008), President (2008–present)

- Prime ministers (complete list) –

- Mahmoud Abbas, Prime minister (2003)
- Ahmed Qurei, Prime minister (2003–2005)
- Nabil Shaath, Acting Prime minister (2005)
- Ahmed Qurei, Prime minister (2005–2006)
- Ismail Haniyeh, Prime minister (2006–2014)
- Salam Fayyad, Prime minister (2007–2013)

- Qatar

- Emirs (complete list) –

- Hamad bin Khalifa Al Thani, Emir (1995–2013)

- Prime ministers (complete list) –

- Abdullah bin Khalifa, Prime minister (1996–2007)
- Hamad bin Jassim, Prime minister (2007–2013)

- Saudi Arabia (complete list) –

- Fahd, King (1982–2005)
- Abdullah, King (2005–2015)

- Syria

- Presidents (complete list) –

- Hafez al-Assad, President (1971–2000)
- Abdul Halim Khaddam, Acting President (2000)
- Bashar al-Assad, President (2000–2024)

- Prime ministers (complete list) –

- Mahmoud Zuabi, Prime minister (1987–2000)
- Muhammad Mustafa Mero, Prime minister (2000–2003)
- Muhammad Naji al-Otari, Prime minister (2003–2011)

- Turkey

- Presidents (complete list) –

- Süleyman Demirel, President (1993–2000)
- Ahmet Necdet Sezer, President (2000–2007)
- Abdullah Gül, President (2007–2014)

- Prime ministers (complete list) –

- Bülent Ecevit, Prime minister (1999–2002)
- Abdullah Gül, Prime minister (2002–2003)
- Recep Tayyip Erdoğan, Prime minister (2003–2014)

- United Arab Emirates

- Presidents (complete list) –

- Zayed bin Sultan Al Nahyan, President (1971–2004)
- Khalifa bin Zayed Al Nahyan, President (2004–2022)

- Prime ministers (complete list) –

- Maktoum bin Rashid Al Maktoum, Prime minister (1990–2006)
- Mohammed bin Rashid Al Maktoum, Prime minister (2006–present)

- Yemen

- Presidents (complete list) –

- Ali Abdullah Saleh, Chairman of the Presidential Council (1990–1994), President (1994–2012)

- Prime ministers (complete list) –

- Abd Al-Karim Al-Iryani, Prime minister (1998–2001)
- Abdul Qadir Bajamal, Prime minister (2001–2007)
- Ali Muhammad Mujawar, Prime minister (2007–2011)

== Europe ==
=== Europe: Balkans ===
- Albania

- Chairmen (complete list) –

- Rexhep Meidani, President (1997–2002)
- Alfred Moisiu, President (2002–2007)
- Bamir Topi, President (2007–2012)

- Prime ministers (complete list) –

- Ilir Meta, Prime minister (1999–2002)
- Pandeli Majko, Prime minister (2002)
- Fatos Nano, Prime minister (2002–2005)
- Sali Berisha, Prime minister (2005–2013)

- Bosnia and Herzegovina

- High Representatives (complete list) –

- Wolfgang Petritsch, High Representative (1999–2002)
- Paddy Ashdown, High Representative (2002–2006)
- Christian Schwarz-Schilling, High Representative (2006–2007)
- Miroslav Lajčák, High Representative (2007–2009)
- Valentin Inzko, High Representative (2009–2021)

- Presidency (complete list) –

- Chairmen of the Presidency (complete list) –

- Ante Jelavić, Chairmen (1999–2000)
- Alija Izetbegović, Chairmen (2000)
- Živko Radišić, Chairman (2000–2001)
- Jozo Križanović, Chairman (2001–2002)
- Beriz Belkić, Chairman (2002)
- Mirko Šarović, Chairman (2002–2003)
- Dragan Čović, Chairman (2003)
- Borislav Paravac, Chairmen (2003)
- Dragan Čović, Chairman (2003–2004)
- Sulejman Tihić, Chairman (2004)
- Borislav Paravac, Chairman (2004–2005)
- Ivo Miro Jović, Chairman (2005–2006)
- Sulejman Tihić, Chairman (2006)
- Nebojša Radmanović, Chairman (2006–2007)
- Željko Komšić, Chairman (2007–2008)
- Haris Silajdžić, Chairman (2008)
- Nebojša Radmanović, Chairman (2008–2009)
- Željko Komšić, Chairman (2009–2010)

- Bosniak members of the Presidency (complete list) –

- Alija Izetbegović, Member (1996–2000)
- Halid Genjac, Member (2000–2001)
- Beriz Belkić, Member (2001–2002)
- Sulejman Tihić, Member (2002–2006)
- Haris Silajdžić, Member (2006–2010)

- Croat members of the Presidency (complete list) –

- Ante Jelavić, Member (1998–2001)
- Jozo Križanović, Member (2001–2002)
- Dragan Čović, Member (2002–2005)
- Ivo Miro Jović, Member (2005–2006)
- Željko Komšić, Member (2006–2014)

- Serb members of the Presidency (complete list) –

- Živko Radišić, Member (1998–2002)
- Mirko Šarović, Member (2002–2003)
- Borislav Paravac, Member (2003–2006)
- Nebojša Radmanović, Member (2006–2014)

- Chairmen of the Council of Ministers (complete list) –

- Haris Silajdžić, Svetozar Mihajlović, Co-Chairmen (1999–2000)
- Martin Raguž, Chairman (2000–2001)
- Božidar Matić, Chairman (2001)
- Zlatko Lagumdžija, Chairman (2001–2002)
- Dragan Mikerević, Chairman (2002)
- Adnan Terzić, Chairman (2002–2007)
- Nikola Špirić, Chairman (2007–2012)

- Bulgaria

- Presidents (complete list) –

- Petar Stoyanov, President (1997–2002)
- Georgi Parvanov, President (2002–2012)

- Prime ministers (complete list) –

- Ivan Yordanov Kostov, Prime minister (1997–2001)
- Simeon Saxe-Coburg-Gotha, Prime minister (2001–2005)
- Sergei Stanishev, Prime minister (2005–2009)
- Boyko Borisov, Prime minister (2009–2013)

- Croatia

- Presidents (complete list) –

- Vlatko Pavletić, Acting President (1999–2000)
- Stjepan Mesić, President (2000–2010)

- Prime ministers (complete list) –

- Zlatko Mateša, Prime minister (1995–2000)
- Ivica Račan, Prime minister (2000–2003)
- Ivo Sanader, Prime minister (2003–2009)
- Jadranka Kosor, Prime minister (2009–2011)

- Greece

- Presidents (complete list) –

- Konstantinos Stephanopoulos, President (1995–2005)
- Karolos Papoulias, President (2005–2015)

- Prime ministers (complete list) –

- Costas Simitis, Prime minister (1996–2004)
- Kostas Karamanlis, Prime minister (2004–2009)
- George Papandreou, Prime minister (2009–2011)

- Republic of Kosova

- Presidents (complete list) –

- Ibrahim Rugova, President (1992–2000)

- Prime ministers (complete list) –

- Bujar Bukoshi, Prime minister (1991–2000)
- Hashim Thaçi, Interim Prime minister (1999–2000)

- UN-administered Kosovo

- Presidents (complete list) –

- Ibrahim Rugova, President (2002–2006)
- Nexhat Daci, acting President (2006)
- Fatmir Sejdiu, President (2006–2010)

- Prime ministers (complete list) –

- Bajram Rexhepi, Prime minister (2002–2004)
- Ramush Haradinaj, Prime minister (2004–2005)
- Adem Salihaj, acting Prime minister (2005)
- Bajram Kosumi, Prime minister (2005–2006)
- Agim Çeku, Prime minister (2006–2008)
- Hashim Thaçi, Prime minister (2008)

- Republic of Kosovo

- Presidents (complete list) –

- Fatmir Sejdiu, President (2008–2010)

- Prime ministers (complete list) –

- Hashim Thaçi, Prime minister (2008–2014)

- (Former Yugoslav) Republic of Macedonia

- Presidents (complete list) –

- Boris Trajkovski, President (1999–2004)
- Branko Crvenkovski, President (2004–2009)
- Gjorge Ivanov, President (2009–2019)

- Prime ministers (complete list) –

- Ljubčo Georgievski, Prime minister (1998–2002)
- Branko Crvenkovski, Prime minister (2002–2004)
- Radmila Šekerinska, Acting Prime minister (2004)
- Hari Kostov, Prime minister (2004)
- Radmila Šekerinska, Acting Prime minister (2004)
- Vlado Bučkovski, Prime minister (2004–2006)
- Nikola Gruevski, Prime minister (2006–2016)

- Montenegro

- Presidents (complete list) –

- Filip Vujanović, President (2006–2018)

- Prime ministers (complete list) –

- Milo Đukanović, Prime minister (2006)
- Željko Šturanović, Prime minister (2006–2008)
- Milo Đukanović, Prime minister (2008–2010)

- Romania

- Presidents (complete list) –

- Emil Constantinescu, President (1996–2000)
- Ion Iliescu, President (2000–2004)
- Traian Băsescu, President (2004–2007)
- Nicolae Văcăroiu, Interim President (2007)
- Traian Băsescu, President (2007–2012)

- Prime ministers (complete list) –

- Mugur Isărescu, Prime minister (1999–2000)
- Adrian Năstase, Prime minister (2000–2004)
- Eugen Bejinariu, Interim Prime minister (2004)
- Călin Popescu-Tăriceanu, Prime minister (2004–2008)
- Emil Boc, Prime minister (2008–2012)

- Serbia

- Presidents (complete list) –

- Boris Tadić, President (2004–2012) (Note: Boris Tadić and Vojislav Koštunica did not become state leaders until Serbia's independence in 2006.)

- Prime ministers (complete list) –

- Vojislav Koštunica, Prime minister (2004–2008)
- Mirko Cvetković, Prime minister (2008–2012)

- Slovenia

- Presidents (complete list) –

- Milan Kučan, President (1991–2002)
- Janez Drnovšek, President (2002–2007)
- Danilo Türk, President (2007–2012)

- Prime ministers (complete list) –

- Janez Drnovšek, Prime minister (1992–2000)
- Andrej Bajuk, Prime minister (2000)
- Janez Drnovšek, Prime minister (2000–2002)
- Anton Rop, Prime minister (2002–2004)
- Janez Janša, Prime minister (2004–2008)
- Borut Pahor, Prime minister (2008–2012)

- Yugoslavia/Serbia and Montenegro

- Presidents (complete list) –

- Slobodan Milošević, President (1997–2000)
- Vojislav Koštunica, President (2000–2003)
- Svetozar Marović, President (2003–2006)

- Prime ministers (complete list) –

- Momir Bulatović, Prime minister (1998–2000)
- Zoran Žižić, Prime minister (2000–2001)
- Dragiša Pešić, Prime minister (2001–2003)

=== Europe: Baltic states ===
- Estonia

- Presidents (complete list) –

- Lennart Meri, President (1992–2001)
- Arnold Rüütel, President (2001–2006)
- Toomas Hendrik Ilves, President (2006–2016)

- Prime ministers (complete list) –

- Mart Laar, Prime minister (1999–2002)
- Siim Kallas, Prime minister (2002–2003)
- Juhan Parts, Prime minister (2003–2005)
- Andrus Ansip, Prime minister (2005–2014)

- Latvia

- Presidents (complete list) –

- Vaira Vīķe-Freiberga, President (1999–2007)
- Valdis Zatlers, President (2007–2011)

- Prime ministers (complete list) –

- Andris Šķēle, Prime minister (1999–2000)
- Andris Bērziņš, Prime minister (2000–2002)
- Einars Repše, Prime minister (2002–2004)
- Indulis Emsis, Prime minister (2004)
- Aigars Kalvītis, Prime minister (2004–2007)
- Ivars Godmanis, Prime minister (2007–2009)
- Valdis Dombrovskis, Prime minister (2009–2014)

- Lithuania

- Presidents (complete list) –

- Valdas Adamkus, President (1998–2003)
- Rolandas Paksas, President (2003–2004)
- Artūras Paulauskas, Acting President (2004)
- Valdas Adamkus, President (2004–2009)
- Dalia Grybauskaitė, President (2009–2019)

- Prime ministers (complete list) –

- Andrius Kubilius, Prime minister (1999–2000)
- Rolandas Paksas, Prime minister (2000–2001)
- Eugenijus Gentvilas, Acting Prime minister (2001)
- Algirdas Brazauskas, Prime minister (2001–2006)
- Zigmantas Balčytis, Acting Prime minister (2006)
- Gediminas Kirkilas, Prime minister (2006–2008)
- Andrius Kubilius, Prime minister (2008–2012)

=== Europe: British and Ireland ===
- Republic of Ireland

- Presidents (complete list) –

- Mary McAleese, President (1997–2011)

- Taoiseachs (complete list) –

- Bertie Ahern, Taoiseach (1997–2008)
- Brian Cowen, Taoiseach (2008–2011)

- United Kingdom

- Monarchs (complete list) –

- Elizabeth II, Queen (1952–2022)

- Prime Ministers (complete list) –

- Tony Blair, Prime Minister (1997–2007)
- Gordon Brown, Prime Minister (2007–2010)

=== Europe: Central ===
- Austria

- Presidents (complete list) –

- Thomas Klestil, President (1992–2004)
- Heinz Fischer, President (2004–2016)

- Chancellors (complete list) –

- Viktor Klima, Chancellor (1997–2000)
- Wolfgang Schüssel, Chancellor (2000–2007)
- Alfred Gusenbauer, Chancellor (2007–2008)
- Werner Faymann, Chancellor (2008–2016)

- Czech Republic

- Presidents (complete list) –

- Václav Havel, President (1993–2003)
- Václav Klaus, President (2003–2013)

- Prime ministers (complete list) –

- Miloš Zeman, Prime Minister (1998–2002)
- Vladimír Špidla, Prime Minister (2002–2004)
- Stanislav Gross, Prime Minister (2004–2005)
- Jiří Paroubek, Prime Minister (2005–2006)
- Mirek Topolánek, Prime Minister (2006–2009)
- Jan Fischer, Prime Minister (2009–2010)

- Germany

- Presidents (complete list) –

- Johannes Rau, President (1999–2004)
- Horst Köhler, President (2004–2010)

- Chancellors (complete list) –

- Gerhard Schröder, Chancellor (1998–2005)
- Angela Merkel, Chancellor (2005–2021)

- Hungary

- Presidents (complete list) –

- Árpád Göncz, President (1990–2000)
- Ferenc Mádl, President (2000–2005)
- László Sólyom, President (2005–2010)

- Prime ministers (complete list) –

- Viktor Orbán, Prime minister (1998–2002)
- Péter Medgyessy, Prime minister (2002–2004)
- Ferenc Gyurcsány, Prime minister (2004–2009)
- Gordon Bajnai, Prime minister (2009–2010)

- Liechtenstein

- Sovereign Princes (complete list) –

- Hans-Adam II, Prince (1989–present)

- Prime ministers (complete list) –

- Mario Frick, Prime minister (1993–2001)
- Otmar Hasler, Prime minister (2001–2009)
- Klaus Tschütscher, Prime minister (2009–2013)

- Poland

- Presidents (complete list) –

- Aleksander Kwaśniewski, President (1995–2005)
- Lech Kaczyński, President (2005–2010)

- Prime ministers (complete list) –

- Jerzy Buzek, Prime minister (1997–2001)
- Leszek Miller, Prime minister (2001–2004)
- Marek Belka, Prime minister (2004–2005)
- Kazimierz Marcinkiewicz, Prime minister (2005–2006)
- Jarosław Kaczyński, Prime minister (2006–2007)
- Donald Tusk, Prime minister (2007–2014)

- Slovakia

- Presidents (complete list) –

- Rudolf Schuster, President (1999–2004)
- Ivan Gašparovič, President (2004–2014)

- Prime ministers (complete list) –

- Mikuláš Dzurinda, Prime minister (1998–2006)
- Robert Fico, Prime minister (2006–2010)

- Switzerland (complete list) –

- Adolf Ogi, President of the Confederation (2000)
- Moritz Leuenberger, President of the Confederation (2001)
- Kaspar Villiger, President of the Confederation (2002)
- Pascal Couchepin, President of the Confederation (2003)
- Joseph Deiss, President of the Confederation (2004)
- Samuel Schmid, President of the Confederation (2005)
- Moritz Leuenberger, President of the Confederation (2006)
- Micheline Calmy-Rey, President of the Confederation (2007)
- Pascal Couchepin, President of the Confederation (2008)
- Hans-Rudolf Merz, President of the Confederation (2009)

=== Europe: East ===
- Belarus

- Presidents (complete list) –

- Alexander Lukashenko, President (1994–present)

- Prime ministers (complete list) –

- Sergey Ling, Prime minister (1996–2000)
- Vladimir Yermoshin, Prime minister (2000–2001)
- Gennady Novitsky, Prime minister (2001–2003)
- Sergei Sidorsky, Prime minister (2003–2010)

- Chechen Republic of Ichkeria (complete list) –

- Aslan Maskhadov, President (1997–2000)

- Moldova

- Presidents (complete list) –

- Petru Lucinschi, President (1997–2001)
- Vladimir Voronin, President (2001–2009)
- Mihai Ghimpu, Acting President (2009–2010)

- Prime ministers (complete list) –

- Dumitru Braghiș, Prime minister (1999–2001)
- Vasile Tarlev, Prime minister (2001–2008)
- Zinaida Greceanîi, Prime minister (2008–2009)
- Vitalie Pîrlog, Acting Prime minister (2009)
- Vlad Filat, Prime minister (2009–2013)

- Russia

- Presidents (complete list) –

- Vladimir Putin, Acting President (1999–2000), President (2000–2008)
- Dmitry Medvedev, President (2008–2012)

- Prime ministers (complete list) –

- Vladimir Putin, Prime minister (1999–2000)
- Mikhail Kasyanov, Prime minister (2000–2004)
- Viktor Khristenko, Acting Prime minister (2004)
- Mikhail Fradkov, Prime minister (2004–2007)
- Viktor Zubkov, Prime minister (2007–2008)
- Vladimir Putin, Prime minister (2008–2012)

- Ukraine

- Presidents (complete list) –

- Leonid Kuchma, President (1994–2005)
- Viktor Yushchenko, President (2005–2010)

- Prime ministers (complete list) –

- Viktor Yushchenko, Prime minister (1999–2001)
- Anatoliy Kinakh, Prime minister (2001–2002)
- Viktor Yanukovych, Prime minister (2002–2004)
- Mykola Azarov, Acting Prime minister (2004)
- Viktor Yanukovych, Prime minister (2004–2005)
- Mykola Azarov, Acting Prime minister (2005)
- Yulia Tymoshenko, Prime minister (2005)
- Yuriy Yekhanurov, Prime minister (2005–2006)
- Viktor Yanukovych, Prime minister (2006–2007)
- Yulia Tymoshenko, Prime minister (2007–2010)

=== Europe: Nordic ===
- Denmark

- Monarchs (complete list) –

- Margrethe II, Queen (1972–2024)

- Prime ministers (complete list) –

- Poul Nyrup Rasmussen, Prime minister (1993–2001)
- Anders Fogh Rasmussen, Prime minister (2001–2009)
- Lars Løkke Rasmussen, Prime minister (2009–2011)

- Finland

- Presidents (complete list) –

- Martti Ahtisaari, President (1994–2000)
- Tarja Halonen, President (2000–2012)

- Prime ministers (complete list) –

- Paavo Lipponen, Prime minister (1995–2003)
- Anneli Jäätteenmäki, Prime minister (2003)
- Matti Vanhanen, Prime minister (2003–2010)

- Iceland

- Presidents (complete list) –

- Ólafur Ragnar Grímsson, President (1996–2016)

- Prime ministers (complete list) –

- Davíð Oddsson, Prime minister (1991–2004)
- Halldór Ásgrímsson, Prime minister (2004–2006)
- Geir Haarde, Prime minister (2006–2009)
- Jóhanna Sigurðardóttir, Prime minister (2009–2013)

- Norway

- Monarchs (complete list) –

- Harald V, King (1991–2026)

- Prime ministers (complete list) –

- Kjell Magne Bondevik, Prime minister (1997–2000)
- Jens Stoltenberg, Prime minister (2000–2001)
- Kjell Magne Bondevik, Prime minister (2001–2005)
- Jens Stoltenberg, Prime minister (2005–2013)

- Sweden

- Monarchs (complete list) –

- Carl XVI Gustaf, King (1973–present)

- Prime ministers (complete list) –

- Göran Persson, Prime minister (1996–2006)
- Fredrik Reinfeldt, Prime minister (2006–2014)

=== Europe: Southcentral ===
- Italy

- Presidents (complete list) –

- Carlo Azeglio Ciampi, President (1999–2006)
- Giorgio Napolitano, President (2006–2015)

- Prime ministers (complete list) –

- Massimo D'Alema, Prime minister (1998–2000)
- Giuliano Amato, Prime minister (2000–2001)
- Silvio Berlusconi, Prime minister (2001–2006)
- Romano Prodi, Prime minister (2006–2008)
- Silvio Berlusconi, Prime minister (2008–2011)

- Malta

- Presidents (complete list) –

- Guido de Marco, President (1999–2004)
- Eddie Fenech Adami, President (2004–2009)
- George Abela, President (2009–2014)

- Prime ministers (complete list) –

- Eddie Fenech Adami, Prime minister (1998–2004)
- Lawrence Gonzi, Prime minister (2004–2013)

- San Marino

- Captains Regent (1900–present) –

- Marino Bollini, Giuseppe Arzilli, Captains Regent (1999–2000)
- Maria Domenica Michelotti, Gian Marco Marcucci, Captains Regent (2000)
- Gianfranco Terenzi, Enzo Colombini, Captains Regent (2000–2001)
- Luigi Lonfernini, Fabio Berardi, Captains Regent (2001)
- Alberto Cecchetti, Gino Giovagnoli, Captains Regent (2001–2002)
- Antonio Lazzaro Volpinari, Giovanni Francesco Ugolini, Captains Regent (2002)
- Mauro Chiaruzzi, Giuseppe Maria Morganti, Captains Regent (2002–2003)
- Pier Marino Menicucci, Giovanni Giannoni, Captains Regent (2003)
- Giovanni Lonfernini, Valeria Ciavatta, Captains Regent (2003–2004)
- Paolo Bollini, Marino Riccardi, Captains Regent (2004)
- Giuseppe Arzilli, Roberto Raschi, Captains Regent (2004–2005)
- Fausta Morganti, Cesare Gasperoni, Captains Regent (2005)
- Claudio Muccioli, Antonello Bacciocchi, Captains Regent (2005–2006)
- Gianfranco Terenzi, Loris Francini, Captains Regent (2006)
- Antonio Carattoni, Roberto Giorgetti, Captains Regent (2006–2007)
- Alessandro Mancini, Alessandro Rossi, Captains Regent (2007)
- Mirko Tomassoni, Alberto Selva, Captains Regent (2007–2008)
- Rosa Zafferani, Federico Pedini Amati, Captains Regent (2008)
- Ernesto Benedettini, Assunta Meloni, Captains Regent (2008–2009)
- Oscar Mina, Massimo Cenci, Captains Regent (2009)
- Stefano Palmieri, Francesco Mussoni, Captains Regent (2009–2010)

- Vatican City

- Sovereign (complete list) –

- John Paul II, Sovereign (1978–2005)
- Benedict XVI, Sovereign (2005–2013)

- President of the Governorate (complete list) –

- Edmund Szoka, President of the Governorate (1997–2006)
- Giovanni Lajolo, President of the Governorate (2006–2011)

=== Europe: Southwest ===
- Andorra

- Episcopal Co-Princes (complete list) –

- Joan Martí i Alanis, Episcopal Co-Prince (1971–2003)
- Joan Enric Vives Sicília, Episcopal Co-Prince (2003–present)

- French Co-Princes (complete list) –

- Jacques Chirac, French Co-Prince (1995–2007)
- Nicolas Sarkozy, French Co-Prince (2007–2012)

- Prime ministers (complete list) –

- Marc Forné Molné, Prime minister (1994–2005)
- Albert Pintat, Prime minister (2005–2009)
- Jaume Bartumeu, Prime minister (2009–2011)

- Portugal

- Presidents (complete list) –

- Jorge Sampaio, President (1996–2006)
- Aníbal Cavaco Silva, President (2006–2016)

- Prime ministers (complete list) –

- António Guterres, Prime minister (1995–2002)
- José Manuel Barroso, Prime minister (2002–2004)
- Pedro Santana Lopes, Prime minister (2004–2005)
- José Sócrates, Prime minister (2005–2011)

- Spain

- Monarchs (complete list) –

- Juan Carlos I, King (1975–2014)

- Prime ministers (complete list) –

- José María Aznar, Prime minister (1996–2004)
- José Luis Rodríguez Zapatero, Prime minister (2004–2011)

=== Europe: West ===
- Belgium

- Monarchs (complete list) –

- Albert II, King (1993–2013)

- Prime ministers (complete list) –

- Guy Verhofstadt, Prime minister (1999–2008)
- Yves Leterme, Prime minister (2008)
- Herman Van Rompuy, Prime minister (2008–2009)
- Yves Leterme, Prime minister (2009–2011)

- France

- Presidents (complete list) –

- Jacques Chirac, President (1995–2007)
- Nicolas Sarkozy, President (2007–2012)

- Prime ministers (complete list) –

- Lionel Jospin, Prime minister (1997–2002)
- Jean-Pierre Raffarin, Prime minister (2002–2005)
- Dominique de Villepin, Prime minister (2005–2007)
- François Fillon, Prime minister (2007–2012)

- Luxembourg

- Monarchs (complete list) –

- Jean, Grand Duke (1964–2000)
- Henri, Grand Duke (2000–2025)

- Prime ministers (complete list) –

- Jean-Claude Juncker, Prime minister (1995–2013)

- Monaco

- Sovereign Prince (complete list) –

- Rainier III, Prince (1949–2005)
- Albert II, Prince (2005–present)

- Minister of State (complete list) –

- Michel Lévêque, Minister of state (1997–2000)
- Patrick Leclercq, Minister of state (2000–2005)
- Jean-Paul Proust, Minister of state (2005–2010)

- The Netherlands

- Monarchs (complete list) –

- Beatrix, Queen (1980–2013)

- Prime ministers of the Netherlands; Chairman of the Council of Ministers of the Kingdom of the Netherlands (complete list) –

- Wim Kok, Prime minister (1994–2002)
- Jan Peter Balkenende, Prime minister (2002–2010)

=== Eurasia: Caucasus ===
- Abkhazia

- Presidents (complete list) –

- Vladislav Ardzinba, President (1994–2005)
- Sergei Bagapsh, President (2005–2011)

- Prime ministers (complete list) –

- Viacheslav Tsugba, Prime minister (1999–2001)
- Anri Jergenia, Prime minister (2001–2002)
- Gennadi Gagulia, Prime minister (2002–2003)
- Raul Khajimba, Prime minister (2003–2004)
- Nodar Khashba, Prime minister (2004–2005)
- Alexander Ankvab, Prime minister (2005–2010)

- Armenia

- Presidents (complete list) –

- Robert Kocharyan, President (1998–2008)
- Serzh Sargsyan, President (2008–2018)

- Prime ministers (complete list) –

- Aram Sargsyan, Prime minister (1999–2000)
- Andranik Margaryan, Prime minister (2000–2007)
- Serzh Sargsyan, Prime minister (2007–2008)
- Tigran Sargsyan, Prime minister (2008–2014)

- Azerbaijan

- Presidents (complete list) –

- Heydar Aliyev, President (1993–2003)
- Ilham Aliyev, President (2003–present)

- Prime ministers (complete list) –

- Artur Rasizade, Prime minister (1996–2003)
- Ilham Aliyev, Prime minister (2003)
- Artur Rasizade, Prime minister (2003–2018)

- Georgia

- Presidents (complete list) –

- Eduard Shevardnadze, President (1992–2003)
- Nino Burjanadze, Acting President (2003–2004)
- Mikheil Saakashvili, President (2004–2007)
- Nino Burjanadze, Acting President (2007–2008)
- Mikheil Saakashvili, President (2008–2013)

- Heads of government (complete list) –

- Vazha Lortkipanidze, State minister (1998–2000)
- Giorgi Arsenishvili, State minister (2000–2001)
- Avtandil Jorbenadze, State minister (2001–2003)
- Zurab Zhvania, State minister (2003–2004), Prime minister (2004–2005)
- Mikheil Saakashvili, Acting President (2005)
- Zurab Noghaideli, Prime minister (2005–2007)
- Giorgi Baramidze, Acting Prime minister (2007)
- Lado Gurgenidze, Prime minister (2007–2008)
- Grigol Mgaloblishvili, Prime minister (2008–2009)
- Nika Gilauri, Prime minister (2009–2012)

- Republic of Nagorno-Karabakh

- Presidents (complete list) –

- Arkadi Ghukasyan, President (1997–2007)
- Bako Sahakyan, President (2007–2020)

- Presidents of the National Assembly (complete list) –

- Oleg Yesayan, President of the National Assembly (1997–2005)
- Ashot Ghulian, President of the National Assembly (2005–2020)

- South Ossetia

- Presidents (complete list) –

- Lyudvig Chibirov, Head of state (1993–2001), President (1996–2001)
- Eduard Kokoity, President (2001–2011)

- Prime ministers (complete list) –

- Merab Chigoev, Prime minister (1998–2001)
- Dmitry Sanakoyev, Prime minister (2001)
- Gerasim Khugayev, Prime minister (2001–2003)
- Igor Sanakoyev, Prime minister (2003–2005)
- Zurab Kokoyev, Acting Prime minister (2005)
- Yury Morozov, Prime minister (2005–2008)
- Boris Chochiev, Acting Prime minister (2008)
- Aslanbek Bulatsev, Prime minister (2008–2009)
- Vadim Brovtsev, Prime minister (2009–2012)

== Oceania ==
=== Oceania: Australia and Papua New Guinea ===
- Australia

- Monarchs (complete list) –

- Elizabeth II, Queen (1952–2022)

- Prime ministers (complete list) –

- John Howard, Prime minister (1996–2007)
- Kevin Rudd, Prime minister (2007–2010)

- Papua New Guinea

- Monarchs (complete list) –

- Elizabeth II, Queen (1975–2022)

- Prime ministers (complete list) –

- Mekere Morauta, Prime minister (1999–2002)
- Michael Somare, Prime minister (2002–2012)

=== Oceania: Pacific ===
- Cook Islands, state in free association

- Monarchs (complete list) –

- Elizabeth II, Queen (1952–2022)

- Prime ministers

- Terepai Maoate, Prime minister (1999–2002)
- Robert Woonton, Prime minister (2002–2004)
- Jim Marurai, Prime minister (2004–2010)

- Fiji

- Heads of state (complete list) –

- Kamisese Mara, Acting President (1993–1994), President (1994–2000)
- Josefa Iloilo, President (2000–2006)
- Frank Bainimarama, Head of the interim military government (2006–2007)
- Josefa Iloilo, President (2007–2009)
- Epeli Nailatikau, President (2009–2015)

- Prime ministers (complete list) –

- Mahendra Chaudhry, Prime minister (1999–2000)
- Tevita Momoedonu, Acting Prime minister (2000)
- 2000 Fijian coup d'état
- Laisenia Qarase, Prime minister (2000–2001)
- Tevita Momoedonu, Acting Prime minister (2001)
- Laisenia Qarase, Prime minister (2001–2006)
- 2006 Fijian coup d'état
- Jona Senilagakali, Acting Prime minister (2006–2007)
- Frank Bainimarama, Acting Prime minister (2007–2014), Prime minister (2014–2022)

- Kiribati (complete list) –

- Teburoro Tito, President (1994–2003)
- Tion Otang, Acting President (2003)
- Anote Tong, President (2003–2016)

- Marshall Islands (complete list) –

- Imata Kabua, President (1997–2000)
- Kessai Note, President (2000–2008)
- Litokwa Tomeing, President (2008–2009)
- Ruben Zackhras, Acting President (2009)
- Jurelang Zedkaia, President (2009–2012)

- Federated States of Micronesia (complete list) –

- Leo Falcam, President (1999–2003)
- Joseph J. Urusemal, President (2003–2007)
- Manny Mori, President (2007–2015)

- Nauru (complete list) –

- René Harris, President (1999–2000)
- Bernard Dowiyogo, President (2000–2001)
- René Harris, President (2001–2003)
- Bernard Dowiyogo, President (2003)
- René Harris, President (2003)
- Bernard Dowiyogo, President (2003)
- Derog Gioura, President (2003)
- Ludwig Scotty, President (2003)
- René Harris, President (2003–2004)
- Ludwig Scotty, President (2004–2007)
- Marcus Stephen, President (2007–2011)

- New Zealand

- Monarchs (complete list) –

- Elizabeth II, Queen (1952–2022)

- Prime ministers (complete list) –

- Helen Clark, Prime minister (1999–2008)
- John Key, Prime minister (2008–2016)

- Palau (complete list) –

- Kuniwo Nakamura, President (1993–2001)
- Tommy Remengesau Jr., President (2001–2009)
- Johnson Toribiong, President (2009–2013)

- Samoa

- Heads of state (complete list) –

- Malietoa Tanumafili II, O le Ao o le Malo (1962–2007)
- Tui Ātua Tupua Tamasese Efi, O le Ao o le Malo (2007–2017)

- Prime ministers (complete list) –

- Tuila'epa Sa'ilele Malielegaoi, Prime minister (1998–2021)

- Solomon Islands

- Monarchs (complete list) –

- Elizabeth II, Queen (1978–2022)

- Prime ministers (complete list) –

- Bartholomew Ulufa'alu, Prime minister (1997–2000)
- Manasseh Sogavare, Prime minister (2000–2001)
- Allan Kemakeza, Prime minister (2001–2006)
- Snyder Rini, Prime minister (2006)
- Manasseh Sogavare, Prime minister (2006–2007)
- Derek Sikua, Prime minister (2007–2010)

- Tonga

- Monarchs (complete list) –

- Tāufaʻāhau Tupou IV, King (1965–2006)
- George Tupou V, King (2006–2012)

- Prime ministers (complete list) –

- Baron Vaea, Prime minister (1991–2000)
- Tupou VI, then known as ʻAhoʻeitu ʻUnuakiʻotonga Tukuʻaho, Prime minister (2000–2006)
- Feleti Sevele, Prime minister (2006–2010)

- Tuvalu

- Monarchs (complete list) –

- Elizabeth II, Queen (1978–2022)

- Prime ministers (complete list) –

- Ionatana Ionatana, Prime minister (1999–2000)
- Lagitupu Tuilimu, Acting Prime minister (2000–2001)
- Faimalaga Luka, Prime minister (2001)
- Koloa Talake, Prime minister (2001–2002)
- Saufatu Sopoanga, Prime minister (2002–2004)
- Maatia Toafa, Prime minister (2004–2006)
- Apisai Ielemia, Prime minister (2006–2010)

- Vanuatu

- Presidents (complete list) –

- John Bani, President (1999–2004)
- Roger Abiut, Acting President (2004)
- Alfred Maseng, President (2004)
- Josias Moli, Acting President (2004)
- Kalkot Mataskelekele, President (2004–2009)
- Maxime Carlot Korman, Acting President (2009)
- Iolu Abil, President (2009–2014)

- Prime ministers (complete list) –

- Barak Sopé, Prime minister (1999–2001)
- Edward Natapei, Prime minister (2001–2004)
- Serge Vohor, Prime minister (2004)
- Ham Lini, Prime minister (2004–2008)
- Edward Natapei, Prime minister (2008–2009)
- Serge Vohor, Acting Prime minister (2009)
- Edward Natapei, Prime minister (2009–2010)

== See also ==
- List of state leaders in the 20th century (1951–2000)
- List of state leaders in the 2010s
- List of state leaders in the 2020s
- List of governors of dependent territories in the 21st century
