= List of captains regent of San Marino =

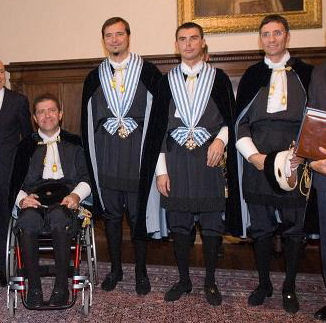
Former Captains Regent Mirko Tomassoni, Alessandro Rossi, Alessandro Mancini and Alberto Selva (from left to right)

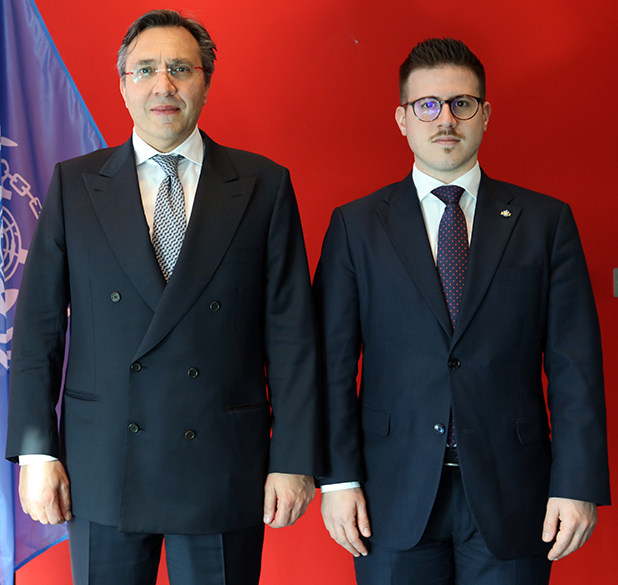
Former Captains Regent Francesco Mussoni (left) and Giacomo Simoncini

The Captains Regent (Italian: Capitani Reggenti; sing.: Capitano Reggente) are the two heads of state of the Republic of San Marino. They are elected every six months by the Grand and General Council, the country's legislative body. Normally the Regents are chosen from opposing parties and they serve a six-month term. The investiture of the captains regent takes place on 1 April and 1 October every year. This tradition dates back at least to 1243.

The practice of dual heads of government (diarchy) is derived directly from the customs of the Roman Republic, equivalent to the consuls of ancient Rome.

== 1900–2020 ==
1900–2020
Year	Semester (Note: The six-month term of the captains regent starts on the first day of the month listed (1 April, 1 October), unless another date is indicated)	Captain Regent One	Captain Regent Two
1900	April	Domenico Fattori	Antonio Righi
1900	October	Giovanni Bonelli	Pietro Ugolini
1901	April	Luigi Tonnini	Marino Nicolini
1901	October	Antonio Bellucci	Pasquale Busignani
1902	April	Onofrio Fattori	Egidio Ceccoli
1902	October	Gemino Gozi	Giacomo Marcucci
1903	April	Federico Gozi	Nullo Balducci
1903	October	Marino Borbiconi	Francesco Marcucci
1904	April	Menetto Bonelli	Vincenzo Mularoni
1904	October	Luigi Tonnini	Gustavo Babboni
1905	April	Antonio Bellucci	Pasquale Busignani
1905	October	Onofrio Fattori	Piermatteo Carattoni
1906	April	Giovanni Belluzzi	Pietro Francini
1906	October	Alfredo Reffi	Giovanni Arzilli
1907	April	Ciro Belluzzi	Francesco Pasquali
1907	October	Giuseppe Angeli	Francesco Valli
1908	April	Menetto Bonelli	Gustavo Babboni
1908	October	Olinto Amati	Raffaele Michetti
1909	April	Luigi Tonnini	Domenico Suzzi Valli
1909	October	Marino Borbiconi	Giacomo Marcucci
1910	April	Alfredo Reffi	Giovanni Arzilli
1910	October	Giovanni Belluzzi	Luigi Lonfernini
1911	April	Moro Morri	Cesare Stacchini
1911	October	Onofrio Fattori	Angelo Manzoni Borghesi
1912	April	Gustavo Babboni	Francesco Pasquali
1912	October	Menetto Bonelli	Vincenzo Marcucci
1913	April	Giuseppe Angeli	Ignazio Grazia
1913	October	Cirro Belluzzi	Domenico Suzzi Valli
1914	April	Domenico Fattori	Ferruccio Martelli
1914	October	Olinto Amati	Cesare Stacchini
1915	April	Moro Morri	Antonio Burgagni
1915	October	Alfredo Reffi	Luigi Lonfernini
1916	April	Onofrio Fattori	Ciro Francini
1916	October	Gustavo Babboni	Giovanni Arzilli
1917	April	Egisto Morri	Vincenzo Marcucci
1917	October	Angelo Manzoni Borghesi	Giuseppe Balducci
1918	April	Ferruccio Martelli	Ermenegildo Mularoni
1918	October	Protogene Belloni	Francesco Morri
1919	April	Domenico Vicini	Pietro Suzzi Valli
1919	October	Moro Morri	Francesco Pasquali
1920	April	Marino Rossi	Ciro Francini
1920	5 December	Carlo Balsimelli	Simone Michelotti
1921	April	Marino Della Balda	Vincenzo Francini
1921	October	Egisto Morri	Giuseppe Lanci
1922	April	Eugenio Reffi	Giovanni Arzilli
1922	October	Onofrio Fattori	Giuseppe Balducci
1923	April	Giuliano Gozi	Filippo Mularoni
1923	October	Marino Borbiconi	Mario Michetti
1924	April	Angelo Manzoni Borghesi	Francesco Mularoni
1924	October	Francesco Morri	Girolamo Gozi
1925	April	Marino Fattori	Augusto Mularoni
1925	October	Valerio Pasquali	Marco Marcucci
1926	April	Manlio Gozi	Giuseppe Mularoni
1926	October	Giuliano Gozi	Ruggero Morri
1927	April	Gino Gozi	Marino Morri
1927	October	Marino Rossi	Nelson Burgagni
1928	April	Domenico Suzzi Valli	Francesco Pasquali
1928	October	Francesco Morri	Melchiorre Filippi
1929	April	Girolamo Gozi	Filippo Mularoni
1929	October	Ezio Balducci	Aldo Busignani
1930	April	Manlio Gozi	Marino Lonfernini (died 10 September); Turiddu Foschi (since 16 September)
1930	October	Valerio Pasquali	Gino Ceccoli
1931	April	Angelo Manzoni Borghesi	Francesco Mularoni
1931	October	Domenico Suzzi Valli	Marino Morri
1932	April	Giuliano Gozi	Pompeo Righi
1932	October	Gino Gozi	Ruggero Morri
1933	April	Francesco Morri	Settimio Belluzzi
1933	October	Carlo Balsimelli	Melchiorre Filippi
1934	April	Marino Rossi	Giovanni Lonfernini
1934	October	Angelo Manzoni Borghesi	Marino Michelotti
1935	April	Federico Gozi	Salvatore Foschi
1935	October	Pompeo Righi	Marino Morri
1936	April	Gino Gozi	Ruggero Morri
1936	October	Francesco Morri	Gino Ceccoli
1937	April	Giuliano Gozi	Settimio Belluzzi
1937	October	Marino Rossi	Giovanni Lonfernini
1938	April	Manlio Gozi	Luigi Mularoni
1938	October	Carlo Balsimelli	Celio Gozi
1939	April	Pompeo Righi	Marino Morri
1939	October	Marino Michelotti	Orlando Reffi
1940	April	Angelo Manzoni Borghesi	Filippo Mularoni
1940	October	Federico Gozi	Salvatore Foschi
1941	April	Gino Gozi	Secondo Menicucci
1941	October	Giuliano Gozi	Giovanni Lonfernini
1942	April	Settimio Belluzzi	Celio Gozi
1942	October	Carlo Balsimelli	Renato Martelli
1943	April	Marino Michelotti	Bartolomeo Manzoni Borghesi
1943	October	Marino Della Balda	Sante Lonfernini
1944	April	Francesco Balsimelli	Sanzio Valentini
1944	October	Teodoro Lonfernini	Leonida Suzzi Valli
1945	April	Alvaro Casali	Vittorio Valentini
1945	October	Ferruccio Martelli	Secondo Fiorini
1946	April	Giuseppe Forcellini	Vincenzo Pedini
1946	October	Filippo Martelli	Luigi Montironi
1947	April	Marino Della Balda	Luigi Zafferani
1947	October	Domenico Forcellini	Mariano Ceccoli
1948	April	Arnaldo Para	Giuseppe Renzi
1948	October	Giordano Giacomini	Domenico Tomassoni
1949	April	Ferruccio Martelli	Primo Bugli
1949	October	Vincenzo Pedini	Agostino Biordi
1950	April	Giuseppe Forcellini	Primo Taddei
1950	October	Marino Della Balda	Luigi Montironi
1951	April	Alvaro Casali	Romolo Giacomini
1951	October	Domenico Forcellini	Giovanni Terenzi
1952	April	Domenico Morganti	Mariano Ceccoli
1952	October	Arnaldo Para	Eugenio Bernardini
1953	April	Vincenzo Pedini	Alberto Reffi
1953	October	Giordano Giacomini	Giuseppe Renzi
1954	April	Giuseppe Forcellini	Secondo Fiorini
1954	October	Agostino Giacomini	Luigi Montironi
1955	April	Domenico Forcellini	Vittorio Meloni
1955	October	Primo Bugli	Giuseppe Maiani
1956	April	Mario Nanni	Enrico Andreoli
1956	October	Mariano Ceccoli	Eugenio Bernardini
1957	April	Giordano Giacomini	Primo Marani
1957	10 October	Provisional Government: Federico Bigi, Alvaro Casali, Pietro Giancecchi, Zaccaria Giovanni Savoretti	
1957	27 October	Marino Valdes Franciosi	Federico Micheloni
1958	April	Zaccaria Giovanni Savoretti	Stelio Montironi
1958	October	Domenico Forcellini	Pietro Reffi
1959	April	Marino Benedetto Belluzzi	Agostino Biordi
1959	October	Giuseppe Forcellini	Ferruccio Piva
1960	April	Alvaro Casali	Gino Vannucci
1960	October	Eugenio Reffi	Pietro Giancecchi
1961	April	Federico Micheloni	Giancarlo Ghironzi
1961	October	Giovanni Vito Marcucci	Pio Galassi
1962	April	Domenico Forcellini	Francesco Valli
1962	October	Antonio Maria Morganti	Agostino Biordi
1963	April	Leonida Suzzi Valli	Stelio Montironi
1963	October	Giovan Luigi Franciosi	Domenico Bollini
1964	April	Marino Benedetto Belluzzi	Eusebio Reffi
1964	October	Giuseppe Micheloni	Pier Marino Mularoni
1965	April	Ferruccio Piva	Federico Carattoni
1965	October	Alvaro Casali	Pietro Reffi
1966	April	Francesco Valli	Emilio Della Balda
1966	October	Giovanni Vito Marcucci	Francesco Maria Francini
1967	April	Vittorio Rossini	Alberto Lonfernini
1967	October	Domenico Forcellini	Romano Michelotti
1968	April	Marino Benedetto Belluzzi	Dante Rossi
1968	October	Pietro Giancecchi	Aldo Zavoli
1969	April	Ferruccio Piva	Stelio Montironi
1969	October	Alvaro Casali	Giancarlo Ghironzi
1970	April	Francesco Valli	Eusebio Reffi
1970	October	Simone Rossini	Giuseppe Lonfernini
1971	April	Luigi Lonfernini	Attilio Montanari
1971	October	Federico Carattoni	Marino Vagnetti
1972	April	Marino Benedetto Belluzzi	Giuseppe Micheloni
1972	October	Rosolino Martelli	Bruno Casali
1973	April	Francesco Maria Francini	Primo Bugli
1973	October	Antonio Lazzaro Volpinari	Giovan Luigi Franciosi
1974	April	Ferruccio Piva	Giordano Bruno Reffi
1974	October	Francesco Valli	Enrico Andreoli
1975	April	Alberto Cecchetti	Michele Righi
1975	October	Giovanni Vito Marcucci	Giuseppe Della Balda
1976	April	Clelio Galassi	Marino Venturini
1976	October	Primo Bugli	Virgilio Cardelli
1977	April	Alberto Lonfernini	Antonio Lazzaro Volpinari
1977	October	Giordano Bruno Reffi	Tito Masi
1978	April	Francesco Valli	Enrico Andreoli
1978	October	Ermenegildo Gasperoni	Adriano Reffi
1979	April	Marino Bollini	Lino Celli
1979	October	Giuseppe Amici	Germano De Biagi
1980	April	Pietro Chiaruzzi	Primo Marani
1980	October	Giancarlo Berardi	Rossano Zafferani
1981	April	Gastone Pasolini	Maria Lea Pedini-Angelini
1981	October	Mario Rossi	Ubaldo Biordi
1982	April	Giuseppe Maiani	Marino Venturini
1982	October	Libero Barulli	Maurizio Gobbi
1983	April	Adriano Reffi	Massimo Roberto Rossini
1983	October	Renzo Renzi	Germano De Biagi
1984	April	Gloriana Ranocchini	Giorgio Crescentini
1984	October	Marino Bollini	Giuseppe Amici
1985	April	Enzo Colombini	Severiano Tura
1985	October	Pier Paolo Gasperoni	Ubaldo Biordi
1986	April	Marino Venturini	Ariosto Maiani
1986	October	Giuseppe Arzilli	Maurizio Tomassoni
1987	April	Renzo Renzi	Carlo Franciosi
1987	October	Rossano Zafferani	Gianfranco Terenzi
1988	April	Umberto Barulli	Rosolino Martelli
1988	October	Luciano Cardelli	Reves Salvatori
1989	April	Mauro Fiorini	Marino Vagnetti
1989	October	Gloriana Ranocchini	Leo Achilli
1990	April	Adalmiro Bartolini	Ottaviano Rossi
1990	October	Cesare Gasperoni	Roberto Bucci
1991	April	Domenico Bernardini	Claudio Podeschi
1991	October	Edda Ceccoli	Marino Riccardi
1992	April	Germano De Biagi	Ernesto Benedettini
1992	October	Romeo Morri	Marino Zanotti
1993	April	Patrizia Busignani	Salvatore Tonelli
1993	October	Gian Luigi Berti	Paride Andreoli
1994	April	Alberto Cecchetti	Fausto Mularoni
1994	October	Renzo Ghiotti	Luciano Ciavatta
1995	April	Marino Bollini	Settimio Lonfernini
1995	October	Pier Natalino Mularoni	Marino Venturini
1996	April	Pier Paolo Gasperoni	Pietro Bugli
1996	October	Maurizio Rattini	Gian Carlo Venturini
1997	April	Paride Andreoli	Pier Marino Mularoni
1997	October	Luigi Mazza	Marino Zanotti
1998	April	Alberto Cecchetti	Loris Francini
1998	October	Pietro Berti	Paolo Bollini
1999	April	Antonello Bacciocchi	Rosa Zafferani
1999	October	Marino Bollini	Giuseppe Arzilli
2000	April	Maria Domenica Michelotti	Gian Marco Marcucci
2000	October	Gianfranco Terenzi	Enzo Colombini
2001	April	Luigi Lonfernini	Fabio Berardi
2001	October	Alberto Cecchetti	Gino Giovagnoli
2002	April	Antonio Lazzaro Volpinari	Giovanni Francesco Ugolini
2002	October	Mauro Chiaruzzi	Giuseppe Maria Morganti
2003	April	Pier Marino Menicucci	Giovanni Giannoni
2003	October	Giovanni Lonfernini	Valeria Ciavatta
2004	April	Paolo Bollini	Marino Riccardi
2004	October	Giuseppe Arzilli	Roberto Raschi
2005	April	Fausta Morganti	Cesare Gasperoni
2005	October	Claudio Muccioli	Antonello Bacciocchi
2006	April	Gianfranco Terenzi	Loris Francini
2006	October	Antonio Carattoni	Roberto Giorgetti
2007	April	Alessandro Mancini	Alessandro Rossi
2007	October	Alberto Selva	Mirko Tomassoni
2008	April	Federico Pedini Amati	Rosa Zafferani
2008	October	Ernesto Benedettini	Assunta Meloni
2009	April	Massimo Cenci	Oscar Mina
2009	October	Francesco Mussoni	Stefano Palmieri
2010	April	Marco Conti	Glauco Sansovini
2010	October	Giovanni Francesco Ugolini	Andrea Zafferani
2011	April	Maria Luisa Berti	Filippo Tamagnini
2011	October	Matteo Fiorini	Gabriele Gatti
2012	April	Maurizio Rattini	Italo Righi
2012	October	Denise Bronzetti	Teodoro Lonfernini
2013	April	Denis Amici	Antonella Mularoni
2013	October	Gian Carlo Capicchioni	Anna Maria Muccioli
2014	April	Luca Beccari	Valeria Ciavatta
2014	October	Gianfranco Terenzi	Guerrino Zanotti
2015	April	Andrea Belluzzi	Roberto Venturini
2015	October	Nicola Renzi	Lorella Stefanelli
2016	April	Gian Nicola Berti	Massimo Andrea Ugolini
2016	October	Fabio Berardi	Marino Riccardi
2017	April	Vanessa D'Ambrosio	Mimma Zavoli
2017	October	Enrico Carattoni	Matteo Fiorini
2018	April	Matteo Ciacci	Stefano Palmieri
2018	October	Luca Santolini	Mirko Tomassoni
2019	April	Michele Muratori	Nicola Selva
2019	October	Luca Boschi	Mariella Mularoni

== Since 2020 ==
Since 2020
Year	Semester	First Captain Regent		Second Captain Regent	
2020	April	Alessandro Mancini	PSD	Grazia Zafferani	RETE
2020	October	Alessandro Cardelli	PDCS	Mirko Dolcini	DML
2021	April	Marco Nicolini	RETE	Gian Carlo Venturini	PDCS
2021	October	Francesco Mussoni	PDCS	Giacomo Simoncini	PS
2022	April	Oscar Mina	PDCS	Paolo Rondelli	RETE
2022	October	Maria Luisa Berti	NS	Manuel Ciavatta	PDCS
2023	April	Alessandro Scarano	PDCS	Adele Tonnini	RETE
2023	October	Filippo Tamagnini	PDCS	Gaetano Troina	DML
2024	April	Milena Gasperoni	PSD	Alessandro Rossi	DEMOS
2024	October	Francesca Civerchia	PDCS	Dalibor Riccardi	Libera
2025	April	Denise Bronzetti	PSD	Italo Righi	PDCS
2025	October	Lorenzo Bugli	PDCS	Matteo Rossi	PSD
2026	April	Alice Mina	PDCS	Vladimiro Selva	Libera
2026	October	Gerardo Giovagnoli	PSD	William Casali	PDCS

== See also ==
- Politics of San Marino
- Diarchy
