= List of youngest state leaders since 1900 =

This is a list of state leaders aged 30 or younger when they assumed office (since 1900). It does not include leaders who did not assume power in their own right, or leaders who served under colonial rule.

== Monarchs ==
Name	State	Position	Born	Assumed office	At age	Notes
Fuad II	Egypt	King	1952	1952	6 months	
Puyi	China	Emperor	1906	1908	2	
Gyanendra	Nepal	King	1947	1950	3	
Mwambutsa IV	Burundi	King	1912	1915	3	
Tenzin Gyatso	Tibet	Dalai Lama	1935	1940	4	
Michael I	Romania	King	1921	1927	5	
Simeon II	Bulgaria	Tsar	1937	1943	6	
Duy Tân	Vietnam	Emperor	1900	1907	7	
Ananda Mahidol	Thailand	King	1925	1935	9	Assumed power following a 10-year regency.
Ahmad Shah Qajar	Sublime State of Persia	Shah	1898	1909	11	Assumed power following a 5-year regency.
Hussein	Jordan	King	1935	1952	16	
Jigme Singye Wangchuck	Bhutan	King	1955	1972	16	
Alfonso XIII	Spain	King	1886	1902	16	Assumed power following a 16-year regency.
Tribhuvan	Nepal	King	1906	1923	17	Assumed power following a regency since 1911.
Farouk I	Egypt	King	1920	1937	17	Assumed power following a 1-year regency.
Marie-Adélaïde	Luxembourg	Grand Duchess	1894	1912	17	
Peter II	Yugoslavia	King	1923	1941	17	Assumed power following a 6-year regency.
Iyasu V	Ethiopia	Emperor	1895	1913	18	
Faisal II	Iraq	King	1935	1953	18	Assumed power following a 14-year regency.
Mswati III	Eswatini	King	1968	1986	18	Assumed power following a 3-year regency.
Manuel II	Portugal	King	1889	1908	18	
Michael I	Romania	King	1921	1940	18	Was previously King from 1927 to 1930 under a regency.
Bhumibol Adulyadej	Thailand	King	1927	1946	18	Assumed power following a 3-year regency.
Ntare V	Burundi	King	1947	1966	18	
Mohammad Zahir Shah	Afghanistan	King	1914	1933	19	
Norodom Sihanouk	Cambodia	King	1922	1941	19	
Baudouin	Belgium	King	1930	1951	20	Acted as regent for his father since 1950.
Mohammad Reza Pahlavi	Iran	Shah	1919	1941	21	
Hassanal Bolkiah	Brunei	Sultan	1946	1967	21	Reigning as Sultan since 1967.
Charlotte	Luxembourg	Grand Duchess	1896	1919	22	
Alexander	Greece	King	1893	1917	23	
Constantine II	Greece	King	1940	1964	23	
Boris III	Bulgaria	Tsar	1894	1918	24	
Jigme Dorji Wangchuck	Bhutan	King	1928	1952	24	
Hirohito	Japan	Emperor	1901	1926	25	Acted as regent for his father since 1921.
Rainier III	Monaco	Prince	1923	1949	25	
Elizabeth II	Australia; Canada; Ceylon; New Zealand; Pakistan; South Africa; United Kingdom	Queen; Queen; Queen; Queen; Queen; Queen; Queen	1926	1952	25	
Jigme Khesar Namgyel Wangchuck	Bhutan	King	1980	2006	26	
Amanullah Khan	Afghanistan	Emir	1892	1919	26	
Moshoeshoe II	Lesotho	King	1938	1965	26	Ruled as Paramount Chief under colonial rule since 1960.
Birendra	Nepal	King	1945	1972	26	
Carl XVI Gustaf	Sweden	King	1946	1973	27	
Letsie III	Lesotho	King	1963	1990	27	
Vajiravudh	Siam	King	1881	1910	29	Acted as regent for his father in 1907.
Karl I	Austria-Hungary	Emperor	1887	1916	29	
Qaboos bin Said	Oman	Sultan	1940	1970	29	
Dipendra	Nepal	King	1971	2001	29	
Vittorio Emanuele III	Italy	King	1869	1900	30	
Elizabeth II	Ghana	Queen	1926	1957	30	

== Non-royal leaders ==
Name	State	Position	Born	Assumed office	At age	Notes
Jean-Claude Duvalier	Haiti	President	1951	1971	19	Became president after his father's death.
Navaandorjiin Jadambaa	Mongolia	Chairman of the Presidium	1900	1924	24	
Valentine Strasser	Sierra Leone	President	1967	1992	25	
Michel Micombero	Burundi	Prime Minister	1940	1966	25	Later became President in 1966 at 26.
Puyi	Manchukuo	Chief Executive	1906	1932	26	
Maria Lea Pedini-Angelini	San Marino	Captain Regent	1954	1981	26	
Enzo Colombini	San Marino	Captain Regent	1958	1985	26	
Giacomo Simoncini	San Marino	Captain Regent	1994	2021	26	
Ahmet Zogu	Albania	Prime Minister	1895	1922	27	Prime minister and President at 29. Became King of Albania in 1928 at 32.
Muammar Gaddafi	Libya	Brotherly Leader and Guide of the Revolution	1942	1969	27	
Gloriana Ranocchini	San Marino	Captain Regent	1957	1984	27	
Giovanni Lonfernini	San Marino	Captain Regent	1976	2003	27	
Abdessalam Jalloud	Libya	Prime Minister	1944	1972	27	
Andrea Zafferani	San Marino	Captain Regent	1982	2010	27	
Matteo Ciacci	San Marino	Captain Regent	1990	2018	27	
Khertek Anchimaa-Toka	Tuva	Chair of the Presidium	1912	1940	28	
Sheikh Maktoum bin Rashid Al Maktoum	United Arab Emirates	Prime Minister	1943	1971	28	
Vanessa D'Ambrosio	San Marino	Captain Regent	1988	2017	28	
Alexander Chervyakov	Belarusian SSR	Prime Minister	1892	1920	28	
Mario Frick	Liechtenstein	Prime Minister	1965	1993	28	
Kim Jong-un	North Korea	General Secretary; Chairman; Supreme Commander	1983	2011	28	Became Supreme leader of North Korea after his father's death.
Giuliano Gozi	San Marino	Captain Regent	1894	1923	28	
Samuel Doe	Liberia	President	1951	1980	28	
Ieremia Tabai	Kiribati	President	1949	1979	29	Served as colonial Chief Minister since 1978.
Jamtsangiin Damdinsüren	Mongolia	Chairman of the Presidium	1898	1927	29	
Lhendup Dorji	Bhutan	Prime Minister	1935	1964	29	
Muhammad Ali Haitham	South Yemen	Prime Minister	1940	1969	29	
Milo Đukanović	Montenegro	Prime Minister	1962	1991	29	
Yahya Jammeh	The Gambia	President	1965	1994	29	
Souley Abdoulaye	Niger	Prime Minister	1965	1994	29	
Roque González Garza	Mexico	President	1885	1915	29	
Gnassingbé Eyadéma	Togo	President	1937	1967	29	
Branko Crvenkovski	Macedonia	Prime Minister	1962	1992	29	
Joseph Kabila	Democratic Republic of the Congo	President	1971	2001	29	
Alessandro Cardelli	San Marino	Captain Regent	1991	2020	29	
Muhammad Ahmad al-Mangoush	Libya	Prime Minister	1967	1997	30	
David Dacko	Central African Republic	President	1930	1960	30	Served as colonial Prime Minister since 1959.
Jean-Baptiste Bagaza	Burundi	President	1946	1976	30	
Bernard Dowiyogo	Nauru	President	1946	1976	30	
Ilir Meta	Albania	Prime Minister	1969	1999	30	
Sadiq al-Mahdi	Sudan	Prime Minister	1935	1966	30	
Marien Ngouabi	Republic of the Congo	President	1938	1969	30	
Lorenzo Bugli	San Marino	Captain Regent	1995	2025	30	
Pandeli Majko	Albania	Prime Minister	1967	1998	30	

== See also ==
- Lists of state leaders
- List of longest-living state leaders
- List of oldest living state leaders
