= Ubaldo Biordi =

Sammarinese politician (1938/1939–2026)

Captain Regent of San Marino
- In office 1 October 1985 – 1 April 1986 Serving with Pier Paolo Gasperoni
- Preceded by: Enzo Colombini and Severiano Tura
- Succeeded by: Ariosto Maiani and Marino Venturini
- In office 1 October 1981 – 1 April 1982 Serving with Mario Rossi
- Preceded by: Maria Lea Pedini-Angelini and Gastone Pasolini
- Succeeded by: Giuseppe Maiani and Marino Venturini

Member of the Grand and General Council
- In office 1974–1998

Personal details
- Born: 1938 or 1939 San Marino
- Died: 2 May 2026 (aged 87) San Marino
- Party: Sammarinese Communist Party (until 1990); Sammarinese Democratic Progressive Party (after 1990)
- Occupation: Politician

Ubaldo Biordi (1938 or 1939 – 2 May 2026) was a Sammarinese politician who served two terms as a Captain Regent of San Marino. A long-standing figure in the country's legislative body, the Grand and General Council, he represented the left-wing political tradition for over two decades.

== Political career ==
Biordi first entered the Grand and General Council in 1974 as a member of the Sammarinese Communist Party (PCS). He remained a member of the legislature for five consecutive terms, serving until 1998. Following the dissolution of the PCS in the early 1990s, he continued his political activity with its successor, the Sammarinese Democratic Progressive Party (PPDS).

During his tenure, Biordi was twice elected as Captain Regent, the joint head of state of the Republic:

- 1 October 1981 – 1 April 1982: served alongside Mario Rossi.
- 1 October 1985 – 1 April 1986: served alongside Pier Paolo Gasperoni.

During his second term as Captain Regent, Biordi co-signed Law No. 127 on 31 October 1985, which formally established the University of the Republic of San Marino (UNIRSM).

== Death ==
Biordi died on 2 May 2026, at the age of 87. His death was marked by tributes from across the Sammarinese political spectrum, recognising him as a "point of reference" for the left and for his integrity in public service. His funeral was held on 6 May at the Sanctuary of Valdragone.

== See also ==
- List of Captains Regent of San Marino
