= Marino Venturini =

Sammarinese politician (1944–2019)

Captain Regent of San Marino
- In office 1 October 1995 – 1 April 1996 Serving with Pier Natalino Mularoni
- Preceded by: Marino Bollini; Settimio Lonfernini
- Succeeded by: Pier Paolo Gasperoni; Pietro Bugli
- In office 1 April 1986 – 1 October 1986; Served with Ariosto Maiani
- Preceded by: Pier Paolo Gasperoni; Ubaldo Biordi
- Succeeded by: Giuseppe Arzilli; Maurizio Tomassoni
- In office 1 April 1982 – 1 October 1982; Served with Giuseppe Maiani
- Preceded by: Mario Rossi; Ubaldo Biordi
- Succeeded by: Libero Barulli; Maurizio Gobbi
- In office 1 April 1976 – 1 October 1976; Served with Clelio Galassi
- Preceded by: Giovanni Vito Marcucci; Giuseppe Della Balda
- Succeeded by: Primo Bugli; Virgilio Cardelli

Personal details
- Born: 23 March 1944 City of San Marino, San Marino
- Died: 5 June 2019 (aged 75) City of San Marino, San Marino
- Party: Socialist Party

Marino Venturini (23 March 1944 – 5 June 2019) was a Sammarinese politician who served as captain regent on four occasions. He was a member of the Sammarinese Socialist Party.

== Biography ==
His first term was with Clelio Galassi (April 1976-October 1976). His second term was with Giuseppe Maiani from (April 1982-October 1982). His third term was with Ariosto Maiani from April 1986 to October 1986. His fourth term was with Piere Natalino Mularoni (October 1995-April 1996).

In 1982 he, alongside Giuseppe Maiani, welcomed Pope John Paul II when the head of the Catholic Church arrived for a historic visit in San Marino.

Marino Venturini died on 5 June 2019 in the state hospital of San Marino.
