= Gloriana Ranocchini =

Sammarinese politician

Captain Regent of San Marino
- In office 1 October 1989 – 1 April 1990; Served with Leo Achilli
- Preceded by: Mauro Fiorini; Marino Vagnetti
- Succeeded by: Adalmiro Bartolini; Ottaviano Rossi
- In office 1 April 1984 – 1 October 1984 Serving with Giorgio Crescentini
- Preceded by: Renzo Renzi; Germano De Biagi
- Succeeded by: Marino Bollini; Giuseppe Amici

Personal details
- Born: 1957
- Party: Communist Party

Gloriana Ranocchini (born 1957) was Captain Regent of San Marino from 1 April 1984 to 1 October 1984 and 1 October 1989 to 1 April 1990.

== Career ==
In 1984, she was co-regent with Giorgio Crescentini. In 1989, Leo Achilli was her co-regent. She was a member of the Sammarinese Communist Party and the Union of Sammarinese Women, a civil association for women's rights. She also founded the Sammarinese Oncological Association. She is remembered as one of the most prominent female figures of San Marino and the protagonist of the reform of Sammarinese family law.
