= Maria Domenica Michelotti =

Sammarinese politician

Captain Regent of San Marino
- In office 1 April 2000 – 1 October 2000; Served with Gian Marco Marcucci
- Preceded by: Marino Bollini; Giuseppe Arzilli
- Succeeded by: Gianfranco Terenzi; Enzo Colombini

Personal details
- Born: 8 October 1952 (age 73) Bourg-Saint-Maurice, France
- Party: Democratic Progressive Party (Before 2001); Party of Democrats (2001–2005); Party of Socialists and Democrats (2005–present)

Maria Domenica Michelotti (born 8 October 1952 in Bourg-Saint-Maurice, France) was a Captain Regent of San Marino from 1 April 2000 to 1 October 2000 with Gian Marco Marcucci.
