= Zafferani =

Zafferani is a surname. Notable people with the surname include:

- Andrea Zafferani (born 1982), Sammarinese politician
- Grazia Zafferani (born 1972), Sammarinese politician
- Rosa Zafferani (born 1960), Sammarinese politician
- Tommaso Zafferani (born 1996), Sammarinese footballer
