= Crescentini =

Crescentini is a surname. Notable people with the surname include:

- Carolina Crescentini (born 1980), Italian actress
- Dino Crescentini (1947–2008), Sammarinese bobsledder
- Federico Crescentini (1982–2006), Sammarinese footballer
- Francesco Florimo (1800–1888), Italian librarian, musicologist, historian of music and composer
- Giorgio Crescentini (born 1950), Sammarinese footballer
- Girolamo Crescentini (1762–1846), Italian singer castrato, singing teacher and composer
