= Fausta Morganti =

Captain Regent of San Marino (1944–2021)

Captain Regent of San Marino
- In office 1 April 2005 – 1 October 2005; Served with Cesare Gasperoni
- Preceded by: Cesare Gasperoni; Roberto Raschi
- Succeeded by: Claudio Muccioli; Antonello Bacciocchi

Personal details
- Born: 20 August 1944 City of San Marino, San Marino
- Died: 2 February 2021 (aged 76) City of San Marino, San Marino
- Party: Communist Party (Before 1990); Democratic Progressive Party (1990–2001); Party of Democrats (2001–2005); Party of Socialists and Democrats (2005–2021)

Fausta Simona Morganti (20 August 1944 – 2 February 2021) was a Sammarinese politician.

== Political career ==
Morganti was the Captain Regent of San Marino, elected for the six-months term from 1 April 2005 to 1 October 2005, with Cesare Gasperoni.

She was a member of the Party of Democrats. Along with Clara Boscaglia and Marina Busignani Reffi, she was one of the first three women elected to the Grand and General Council in 1974; ultimately Reffi did not take her seat, though Boscaglia did.

== Death ==
Morganti died in San Marino City "with the corona virus in her body" ("con il coronavirus in corpo") on 2 February 2021, aged 76. Her memorial service was held on 6 February.
