= Mariella Mularoni =

Captain Regent of San Marino from 2019 to 2020

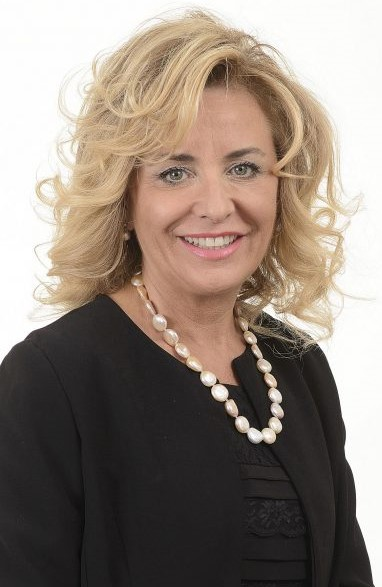

Captain Regent of San Marino
- In office 1 October 2019 – 1 April 2020 Serving with Luca Boschi
- Preceded by: Nicola Selva; Michele Muratori
- Succeeded by: Alessandro Mancini; Grazia Zafferani

Secretary of State for Health, Social Security, Equal Opportunities and Technological Innovation
- In office 28 June 2023 – 29 May 2026
- Preceded by: Roberto Ciavatta

Personal details
- Born: 15 October 1962 City of San Marino, San Marino
- Died: 29 May 2026 (aged 63)
- Party: Christian Democratic Party
- Children: 2
- Education: University of Bologna

Mariella Mularoni (15 October 1962 – 29 May 2026) was a Sammarinese politician who served as Captain Regent of San Marino alongside Luca Boschi from 1 October 2019 to 1 April 2020. She also served as Secretary of Health.

== Life and career ==
Mularoni was born in the City of San Marino on 15 October 1962.

She was an English language teacher at the middle school and the high school of Titano since 1987. She joined the Sammarinese Christian Democratic Party in 1994 and has served as a member of the Grand and General Council for two consecutive elections since 2013. From 2020 to 2022 she was a Representative of San Marino in the Parliamentary Assembly of the Council of Europe and then from late 2022 to 2024 a substitute as a member of the European People's Party where she was on the Committee on Culture, Science, Education, and Media. Notably, during her tenure, she signed on a written declaration by Pieter Omtzigt asking for Julian Assange not be extradited to the United States and she also signed a motion to transfer Mikheil Saakashvili away from Georgia.

Mularoni had two daughters. She died after a long illness on 29 May 2026, at the age of 63. The government declared 1 June a day of national mourning and announced a state funeral for Mularoni on that day, with the lying-in-state to be held at the Begni Palace and the funeral at the Basilica di San Marino.
