= Luca Boschi =

Sammarinese politician

Captain Regent of San Marino
- In office 1 October 2019 – 1 April 2020 Serving with Mariella Mularoni
- Preceded by: Nicola Selva; Michele Muratori
- Succeeded by: Alessandro Mancini; Grazia Zafferani

Personal details
- Born: 29 December 1972 (age 53) Piacenza, Italy
- Party: Libera San Marino (since 2020)
- Other political affiliations: Civic 10 (2016–2020)
- Education: Cardiff University

Luca Boschi (born 29 December 1972) is a Sammarinese politician and one of the Captains Regent, who served with Mariella Mularoni from 1 October 2019 until 1 April 2020.

== Life ==
Boschi was born in Italy and grew up in Milan. After graduating in the subject of International Business Marketing from Cardiff University in Wales, he returned to San Marino and worked as a freelancer in the private sector. He joined the political party Civic 10, and has served as a member of the Grand and General Council since December 2016.
