= Nicola Selva =

Sammarinese politician

Captain Regent of San Marino
- In office 1 April 2019 – 1 October 2019 Serving with Michele Muratori
- Preceded by: Mirko Tomassoni; Luca Santolini
- Succeeded by: Luca Boschi; Mariella Mularoni

Personal details
- Born: 4 July 1962 (age 64) City of San Marino, San Marino
- Party: Future Republic
- Education: Leon Battista Alberti Institute in Rimini
- Sports career
- Nationality: Sammarinese
- Height: 1.76 m (5 ft 9 in)
- Sport: Sprinting
- Event: 4 × 100 metres relay

Nicola Selva (born 4 July 1962) is a Sammarinese politician and a retired sprinter. He was one of the Captains Regent, serving with Michele Muratori. He took office on 1 April 2019 and left on 1 October 2019.

== Life ==
He served as a member of the Grand and General Council from 2006 until 2011 and again from 2012. Selva graduated in industrial technology from the Leon Battista Alberti Institute in Rimini. In 2016, he was one of the co-founders of the Future Republic party.

== Sporting career ==
He also competed in the men's 4 × 100 metres relay at the 1992 Summer Olympics.
