= Luca Santolini =

Sammarinese politician

Captain Regent of San Marino
- In office 1 October 2018 – 1 April 2019 Serving with Mirko Tomassoni
- Preceded by: Stefano Palmieri; Matteo Ciacci
- Succeeded by: Nicola Selva; Michele Muratori

Personal details
- Born: 22 February 1985 (age 41) Borgo Maggiore, San Marino
- Party: Civic 10
- Education: University of Bologna, University of Urbino

Luca Santolini (born 22 February 1985) is a Sammarinese politician and one of the Captains Regent, who served with Mirko Tomassoni from 1 October 2018 until 1 April 2019.

== Life ==
He has been serving as a member of the Grand and General Council since 2012. Santolini graduated in international relations from the University of Bologna and in journalism from the University of Urbino.
