= Michele Muratori =

Sammarinese politician

Captain Regent of San Marino
- In office 1 April 2019 – 1 October 2019 Serving with Nicola Selva
- Preceded by: Mirko Tomassoni; Luca Santolini
- Succeeded by: Luca Boschi; Mariella Mularoni

Personal details
- Born: 13 December 1983 (age 42) City of San Marino, San Marino
- Party: Socialist Democratic Left (previously Party of Socialists and Democrats)
- Education: University of Bologna

Michele Muratori (born 13 December 1983) is a Sammarinese politician, who was a Captains Regent, serving with Nicola Selva. He took office on 1 April 2019 and it ended on 1 October 2019.

== Life ==
He is serving as a member of the Grand and General Council. Muratori graduated in Political and Social Sciences from the University of Bologna and is a leader of the political party Socialist Democratic Left. By profession he is a public employee.
