= Constance Simelane =

Eswatini politician (1942–2025)

Her Excellency the Right Honourable Constance T. Simelane

Deputy Prime Minister of Swaziland
- In office 2006–2008
- Monarch: Mswati III
- Prime Minister: Themba Dlamini

Education minister
- In office 2003–2006
- Monarch: Mswati III
- Prime Minister: Themba Dlamini

Personal details
- Party: None

Constance Simelane (14 October 1942 – 13 July 2025) was an Eswatini politician who rose to become the first female Deputy Prime Minister of the Kingdom of Swaziland. Appointed to the Senate in 2001, Simelane became Minister of Education in 2003. In October 2006 Simelane was appointed Deputy Prime Minister by King Mswati III, succeeding Albert Shabangu who had died a month earlier.

== Personal history ==
Simelane was born to Funwako Simelane, a teacher from Swaziland and his wife Judith (née LaNkonyane). Judith, who was born in Amsterdam, Mpumalanga in South Africa, met Funwako, who was originally from the KoNtshingila community of Shiselweni while he was teaching at Kington High School in Vryheid, South Africa. The two married in 1940, after Judith had finished high school. Simelane was the second eldest of six children. Her elder sister, Thandiwe Dlamini, was the longest serving executive director of the Red Cross in Swaziland. She has two other sisters, Nomcebo and Zandile and two brothers, Dumisa and Sifiso.

In 1958, under an order by King Sobhuza II of Swaziland, Simelane's father was recalled to Swaziland to work in the district capital. He taught at a number of high schools before becoming an ambassador for a number of countries, returning to Swaziland to act as a minister for finance. He died in 1980.

After leaving high school Simelane gained a scholarship from the African scholarship program of American Universities and became a student at Roosevelt University in Chicago where she studied for a degree is social sciences. From Chicago she undertook a Master of Business Administration from the University of Washington before studying advanced purchasing strategies in Austria.

Simelane worked as a credit researcher in Chicago. Before moving back to Swaziland where she took on the role of assistant secretary in the Deputy Prime Minister's Office. She then moved to Ethiopia where she worked for the United Nations Economic Commission for Africa in Addis Ababa.

== Political career ==
In 2003 Simelane took her place as a member of the House of Assembly of Eswatini as one of the ten ministers constitutionally allowed by the monarch, then King Mswati III. She was given the post of minister of education from the date of her appointment. During her time as education minister, Simelane introduced a scheme to allow all vulnerable and orphaned primary and secondary school children to be able to attend school, despite the nation demanding a fee for basic education. With a national HIV infection rate of roughly 40%, the highest in the world, many children fell under the category that Simelane was attempting to address. She pledged to release $6.4 million to pay for the children effected and ordered that all children who presented themselves to schools should be accepted. This was undertaken by schools despite concerns that the government would not fulfill its pledge. These fears were realized and despite the government releasing the funds at the end of the academic year, the damage was done and many of the children taken in had already been released and many school heads threatened to strike over the issue. Further education programs introduced by Simelane included free school text books for vulnerable children, but this was deemed as a failure due to many of these children being unable to attend school due to the lack of available fees. She also called upon pregnant girls to be re-admitted to education, as since independence in 1968, standard practice was to expel girls from school if they became pregnant. Although not a governmental law, she gave her backing to the decision made by the Swaziland Schools Headteachers Association.

In 2006, following the death of Albert Shabangu, Simelane was given the position of Deputy Prime Minister, the first woman to hold the role. Although welcomed by gender right groups, the role of deputy had become mainly ceremonial after responsibility for the national development authority was removed from the portfolio and handed to the Regional Development and Youth Affairs. She remained in the post until 2008.

Since leaving her post in the government, Simelane has continued to be a vocal supporter of both education and women's rights and speaks on a wide range of issues regarding the empowerment of women in Swaziland.

== Other appointments ==
From 2004 to 2005 Simelane held the position of Chairperson of the Executive Committee of the Commonwealth Parliamentary Association.

== Death ==
She died on 13 July 2025.
