= Themba Dlamini =

Prime Minister of Eswatini (born 1950)

Absalom Themba Dlamini
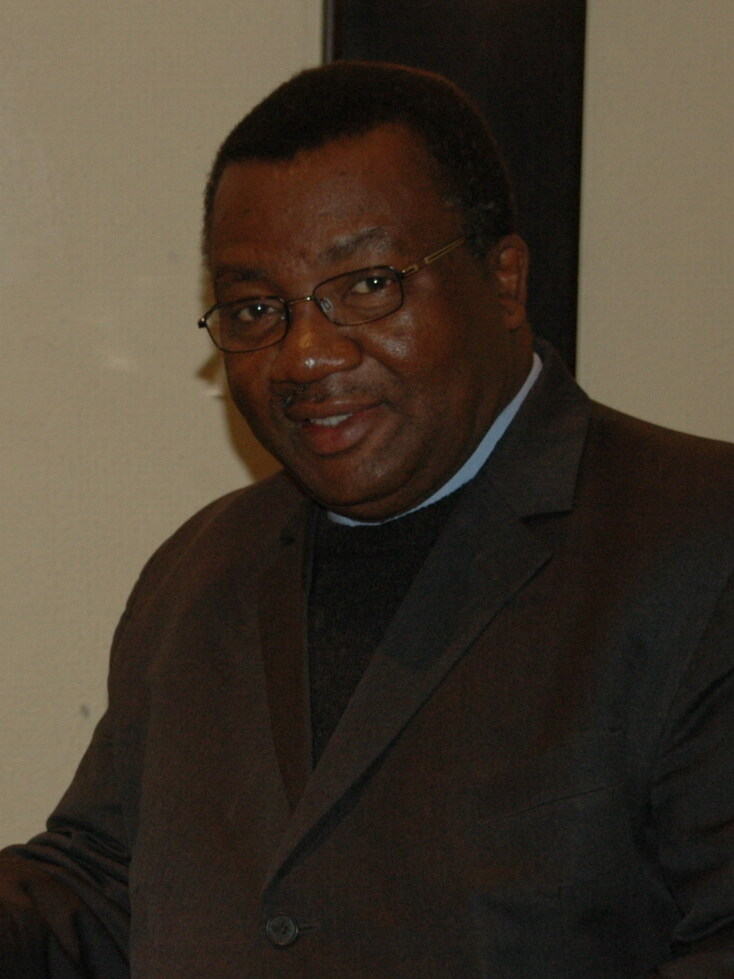

9th Prime Minister of Eswatini
- In office 6 November 2003 – 18 September 2008
- Monarch: Mswati III
- Deputy: Constance Simelane
- Preceded by: Paul Shabangu
- Succeeded by: Bheki Dlamini (Acting)

Personal details
- Born: 1 December 1950 (age 74)

Absalom Themba Dlamini (born 1 December 1950) was the Prime Minister of Eswatini from November 2003 to September 2008. He is the managing director of Tibiyo Taka Ngwane.

== Biography ==
Dlamini graduated from the University of Botswana and Swaziland in 1978 with a bachelor's degree. In 1987, he earned a master's degree from the University of Nairobi. He gained experience in many different fields since his apprenticeship; he held manager positions with the Eswatini National Provident Fund, the Central Bank of Eswatini and the Eswatini Industrial Development Company. In addition, Dlamini served as a director in many Swazi companies. From 1991 he was the director and chairman of Tibiyo TakaNgwane, a national organization for the preservation of the culture of Eswatini and the development of economic strategies.

Dlamini was appointed prime minister on 14 November 2003. King Mswati III honored him with the "Royal Medal of the Supreme Advisor to the Royal Decree of King Sobhuza II." He remained in office until 18 September 2008 when Bheki Dlamini was appointed acting prime minister. On 16 October 2008, he was succeeded by former prime minister Barnabas Sibusiso Dlamini.

Political offices
Preceded by Paul Shabangu	Prime Minister of Eswatini; 2003–2008	Succeeded by Bheki Dlamini; Acting
