= Paul Shabangu =

Paul Shabangu (1943–2024) served as acting Prime Minister of Swaziland from 29 September 2003 to 6 November 2003. He was appointed after the cabinet was dismissed in preparation for a general election, and briefly ran the government from a Japanese hotel room. He also served as the King's private secretary.

== Biography ==
For 25 years he was the private secretary of King Mswati III, he also worked in the police. He took over the power before the parliamentary elections at the hands of Barnabas Sibusiso Dlamini, after which he was handed over to Absalompwo by Themba Daminini after the formation of a new cabinet. Most of the time, he was in a hotel room in Tokyo, from where he managed the government's work. Later he was deputy prime minister. He was also the head of the board examining applications for citizenship, which, however, under his rule did not really meet, and therefore had to return the subsidy.

Political offices
Preceded by Barnabas Sibusiso Dlamini	Prime Minister of Swaziland; 2003	Succeeded by Themba Dlamini
