= Severiano Tura =

Sammarinese politician (born 1934)

Severiano Tura (born 1934) is a Sammarinese politician who served as Captain Regent of San Marino from 1 April to 1 October 1985, alongside Enzo Colombini. He is a survivor of the Bombing of San Marino in World War II.

== See also ==
- List of captains regent of San Marino
