= Mirko Tomassoni =

Sammarinese politician

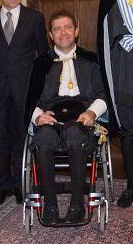

Captain Regent of San Marino
- In office 1 October 2018 – 1 April 2019 Serving with Luca Santolini
- Preceded by: Stefano Palmieri; Francesco Mussoni
- Succeeded by: Nicola Selva; Michele Muratori
- In office 1 October 2007 – 1 April 2008 Serving with Alberto Selva
- Preceded by: Alessandro Mancini; Alessandro Rossi
- Succeeded by: Federico Pedini Amati; Rosa Zafferani

Personal details
- Born: 24 April 1969 (age 57) Borgo Maggiore, San Marino
- Party: PSD

Mirko Tomassoni (born 24 April 1969) is a Sammarinese politician, who served as Captain Regent of San Marino for the six-month term from October 2007 to April 2008 and the second term from October 2018 until April 2019. He served together with Alberto Selva in the first term and with Luca Santolini in his second term. He is a Member of the Parliament of San Marino, Member of the ICD Advisory Board, and Minister of Culture of San Marino.

== Life ==
Mirko Tomassoni was born in Borgo Maggiore on 24 April 1969. He entered the political life of the country beginning in 1992. In 1999 he was in a car accident that changed his life and deprived him of an active lifestyle. He was elected to the local town council three times before his being elected to the Grand and General Council.

Tomassoni was elected in June 2006 to the Grand and General Council as an independent on the list of the Party of Socialists and Democrats. On 1 October 2007 Mirko Tomassoni was elected as one of the heads of state, making him the first disabled person to ever have been elected as captain regent. According to the laws of San Marino after his stay at the post of Head of State of San Marino he returned to civil life. He seeks to improve awareness of disability among all people and does his best to help such people in their everyday life. He wrote the book Bolivia 2013 which was published on 19 March 2014.
