= Giorgio Crescentini =

Captain Regent of San Marino and footballer

Giorgio Crescentini (born 8 March 1950) is a former Captain Regent of San Marino and a retired San Marinese footballer who heads the San Marino Football Federation.

== Biography ==
Giorgio Crescentini was born on 8 March 1950 in San Marino. Crescentini graduated from the Urbino Sports High School in 1973 and played football in both Italy and his native San Marino. He first joined the Football Association of San Marino in 1977, and served as its vice-president from 1982 to 1985 before becoming president in 1985. Crescentini has been re-elected seven times. On 1 April 1984, Crescentini became Captain Regent of San Marino, co-serving with Gloriana Ranocchini until 1 October 1984.
