= Bheki Dlamini =

Bheki Dlamini served as acting Prime Minister of Swaziland from 18 September 2008 to 23 October 2008.

== Biography ==
Dlamini was 2006-2013 head of the royal office of King Mswati III. After the dismissal of the previous government of Prime Minister Absalom Themba Dlamini, he was on 18 September 2008 acting Prime Minister of Swaziland. He held this office until 23 October 2008, being replaced by Barnabas Sibusiso Dlamini.

Political offices
Preceded by Themba Dlamini	Prime Minister of Swaziland; 2008	Succeeded by Barnabas Sibusiso Dlamini
