= Rosa Zafferani =

Sammarinese politician

Captain Regent of San Marino
- In office 1 April 2008 – 1 October 2008; Served with Federico Pedini Amati
- Preceded by: Mirko Tomassoni; Alberto Selva
- Succeeded by: Ernesto Benedettini; Assunta Meloni
- In office 1 April 1999 – 1 October 1999; Served with Antonello Bacciocchi
- Preceded by: Paolo Bollini; Pietro Berti
- Succeeded by: Giuseppe Arzilli; Marino Bollini

Personal details
- Born: 16 August 1960 (age 66) Jersey City, New Jersey, U.S.
- Party: Christian Democratic Party (Before 2007); Centre Democrats (2007–2011)
- Education: University of Bologna

Rosa Zafferani (born 16 August 1960) is a Sammarinese politician. She was a member of the Sammarinese Christian Democratic Party until she left with the rest of the left-wing faction of the party to form the Centre Democrats.

== Political career ==
Zafferani served as Secretary of State for health, education and the interior. She served as Captain Regent for the April through October 1999 term before reassuming the role for a second time, together with Federico Pedini Amati, from April through October 2008.

== See also ==
- Politics of San Marino
