= Federico Pedini Amati =

Sammarinese politician

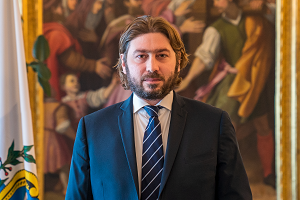

Captain Regent of San Marino
- In office 1 April 2008 – 1 October 2008 Serving with Rosa Zafferani
- Preceded by: Mirko Tomassoni; Alberto Selva
- Succeeded by: Ernesto Benedettini; Assunta Meloni

Secretary of State for Tourism, Postal Affairs, Cooperation and Expò
- Incumbent
- Assumed office 7 January 2020

Personal details
- Born: 11 August 1976 (age 49) City of San Marino, San Marino
- Party: PSD

Federico Pedini Amati (born 11 August 1976) is a political figure from San Marino.

== Captain Regent ==
He served as Captain Regent of San Marino for the term from 1 April 2008 to October 2008. As joint head of state according to the country's constitution, he served together with Rosa Zafferani.

=== Political affiliation ===
Pedini is a member of the Party of Socialists and Democrats.

== See also ==
- Politics of San Marino
