= Alberto Selva =

Captain Regent of San Marino (2008)

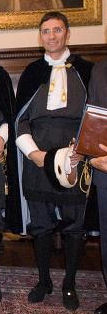

Captain Regent of San Marino
- In office 1 October 2007 – 1 April 2008; Alongside: Mirko Tomassoni
- Preceded by: Alessandro Mancini; Alessandro Rossi
- Succeeded by: Federico Pedini Amati; Rosa Zafferani

Personal details
- Born: 21 September 1964 (age 62) City of San Marino, San Marino
- Education: University of Bologna

Alberto Selva (born 21 September 1964) is a Sammarinese lawyer and politician, who was Captain Regent of San Marino for the term October 2007 - March 2008, together with Mirko Tomassoni.

Selva, a lawyer, is a member of the Alleanza Popolare. He was elected in June 2006 to the Grand and General Council.

Selva had studied law at the University of Bologna.
