= Gian Marco Marcucci =

Sammarinese politician

Gian Marco Marcucci (born 25 July 1954) served as a Captain Regent of San Marino from 1 April 2000 to 1 October 2000. He served with Maria Domenica Michelotti. He is of the Sammarinese Christian Democratic Party.
