= Giuseppe Amici =

Sammarinese politician (1939–2006)

- Born: January 6, 1939
- Died: February 23, 2006 (aged 67)
- Occupation: politician

Giuseppe Amici (6 January 1939 – 23 February 2006) was a Sammarinese politician.

At the age of 25, he was elected to the Grand and General Council and remained its member until 2001. Amici was Captain Regent with Germano De Biagi from October 1979 to April 1980 and with Marino Bollini from October 1984 to April 1985. He was a member of the former Sammarinese Communist Party. At the time of his death, he was the president of the Communist Refoundation Party.
