= Maria Lea Pedini-Angelini =

Captain Regent of San Marino in 1981

Maria Lea Pedini
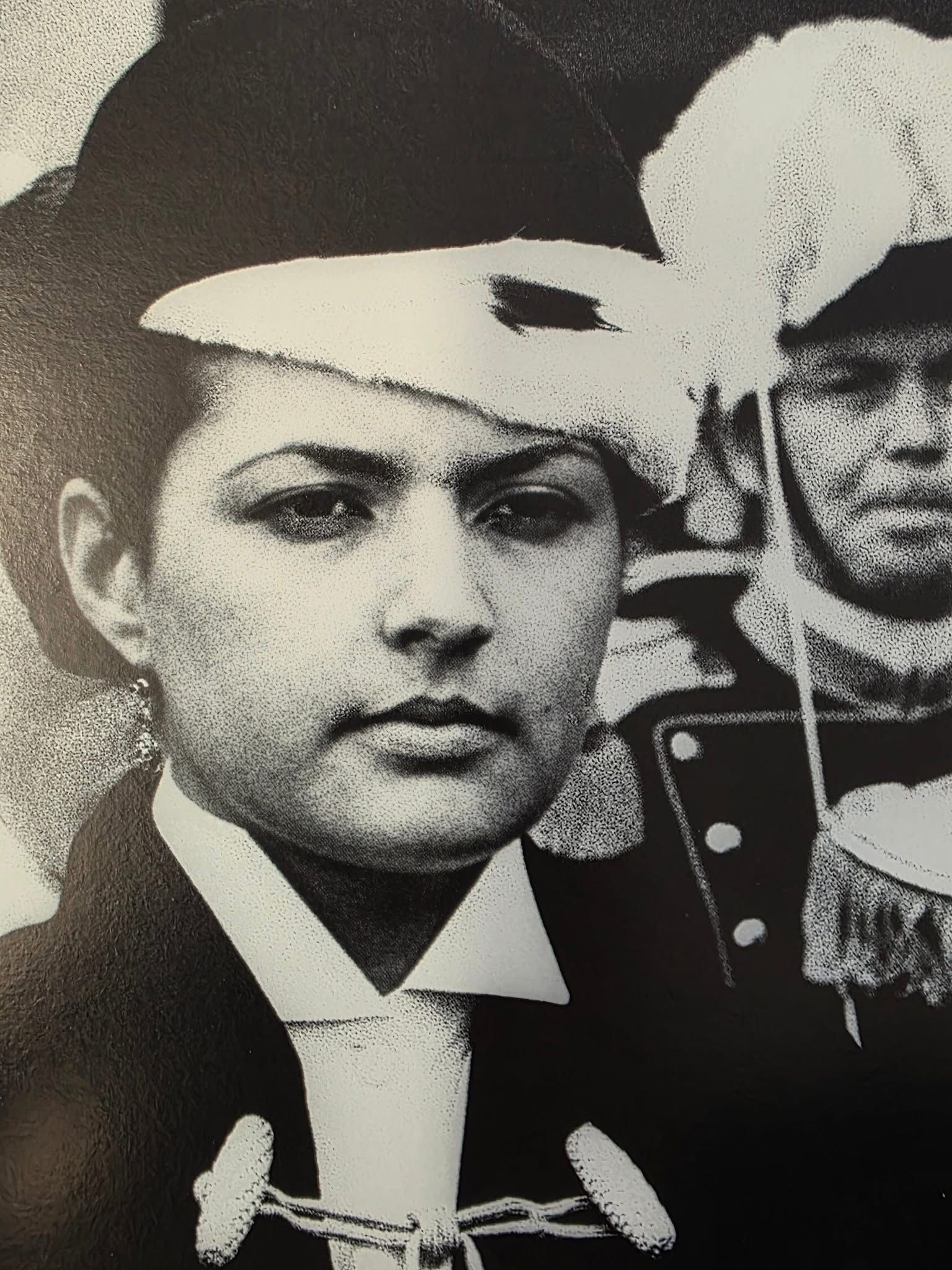

Captain Regent of San Marino
- In office 1 April 1981 – 1 October 1981; Served with Gastone Pasolini
- Preceded by: Giancarlo Berardi; Rossano Zafferani
- Succeeded by: Mario Rossi; Ubaldo Biordi

Personal details
- Born: 15 July 1954 (age 72)
- Party: Christian Democratic Party

Maria Lea Pedini-Angelini (born 15 July 1954) served as a Captain Regent of San Marino from 1 April 1981 to 1 October 1981. She served with Gastone Pasolini. She was the first female head of state of San Marino and, at age 26, the youngest non-royal state leader in Europe since 1900. She later served as Director in the Ministry of Government and Foreign Affairs.

She has been a non-resident Ambassador in the Ministry to Switzerland, Denmark, Sweden, Norway and Hungary.

== Honors ==
- Order of Merit of the Italian Republic (Italy, 1998)
- Legion of Honour (France, 2004)
