= Renzo Renzi =

Sammarinese politician

Renzo Renzi (born c. 1946) is a Sammarinese politician. Renzi became a communist activist at the age of seventeen. In 1983 he was a member of the secretariat of the Sammarinese Communist Party. In October 1983 he was sworn in as one of the two Captains Regent (i.e. head of state of San Marino) for a six-month period. He was 37 years old at the time.
