= Marino Vagnetti =

Sammarinese politician

Marino Vagnetti (born 11 February 1924) is a former Sammarinese politician. He served twice as Captain Regent of San Marino from 1 October 1971 to 1 April 1972, and from 1 April 1989 to 1 October 1989.
