= Roberto Raschi =

Sammarinese politician

Roberto Raschi (born 11 August 1964) was Captain Regent of San Marino.

He was in office with Giuseppe Arzilli during the six-month term from 1 October 2004 to 1 April 2005.

He is a member of the Sammarinese Socialist Party.
