= Cesare Gasperoni =

Sammarinese politician

Cesare Antonio Gasperoni (born 17 October 1944) was one of the two Captains Regent of San Marino from 1 October 1990 to 1 April 1991 and from 1 April 2005 to 1 October 2005.

Gasperoni is a member of the San Marinese Christian Democratic Party (PDCS).
