= Giuseppe Maiani =

Sammarinese politician

Giuseppe "Pippo" Maiani (5 November 1924 – 12 May 2016) was Captain Regent of San Marino from 1 October 1955 to 1 April 1956, and again from 1 April 1982 to 1 October 1982.

He was a member of the Sammarinese Communist Party.
