= Enzo Colombini =

Sammarinese politician (born 1958)

Enzo Colombini (born 10 June 1958) has served as Captain-Regent of San Marino twice. He first served alongside Severiano Tura from 1 April 1985 to 1 October 1985, then alongside Gianfranco Terenzi from 1 October 2000 to 1 April 2001. He belongs to the Sammarinese Communist Party and Sammarinese Democratic Progressive Party.
