= Marino Bollini =

Sammarinese politician (1933–2020)

Marino Bollini (25 February 1933 – 10 January 2020) served as Captain-Regent of San Marino multiple times.

== Career ==
He first served from 1 April 1979 to 1 October 1979 alongside Lino Celli. He served alongside Giuseppe Amici from 1 October 1984 to 1 April 1985. From 1 April 1995 to 1 October 1995, he served alongside Settimio Lonfernini. From 1 October 1999 to 1 April 2000, he served alongside Giuseppe Arzilli. He was a member of the Sammarinese Socialist Party until 2005, when he joined the Party of Socialists and Democrats.

== Personal life ==
Marino Bollini died on 10 January 2020, at the age of 86.
