= Giuseppe Arzilli =

Sammarinese politician (1941–2023)

Giuseppe Arzilli (20 February 1941 – 19 November 2023) was a Sammarinese politician who was the Captain Regent of San Marino.

Arzilli served three six-month terms, the first from October 1986 to April 1987, the second from October 1999 to April 2000, and the third from October 2004 to April 2005. He was a member of the Sammarinese Christian Democratic Party. Arzilli died on 19 November 2023, at the age of 82.
