= 2026 in San Marino =

- Decades: 2000s; 2010s; 2020s
- See also: History of San Marino; List of years in San Marino

Events in the year 2026 in San Marino.

== Incumbents ==
- Captains Regent:
  - Matteo Rossi, Lorenzo Bugli (until 1 April)
  - Alice Mina, Vladimiro Selva (1 April–1 October)
  - Gerardo Giovagnoli, William Casali (since 1 October)
- Secretary for Foreign and Political Affairs: Luca Beccari

== Events ==
- 6–22 February – San Marino at the 2026 Winter Olympics
- 27 July – 2 August – 2026 San Marino Open
- 22 August – Pope Leo made a pastoral visit San Marino.
- 25 September – San Marino becomes the 76th signatory to the Artemis Accords

== Art and entertainment ==
- San Marino in the Eurovision Song Contest 2026

== Holidays ==
- 1 January – New Year's Day
- 6 January – Epiphany
- 5 February – Saint Agatha
- 25 March – Anniversary of the Arengo
- 5 April – Easter
- 6 April – Easter Monday
- 1 May – Labour Day
- 4 June – Corpus Christi
- 15 August – Ferragosto
- 3 September – The Feast of Saint Marinus and the Republic
- 1 November – All Saints Day
- 2 November – Commemoration of all those who died at war
- 8 December – Immaculate Conception
- 24 December – Christmas Eve
- 25 December – Christmas Day
- 26 December – Saint Stephen's Day
- 31 December – New Year's Eve

== Deaths ==
- 2 May – Ubaldo Biordi, 87, captain regent (1981–1982, 1985–1986)
- 29 May – Mariella Mularoni, 63, captain regent (2019–2020)
- 21 August – Matteo Fiorini, 48, captain regent (2011–2012, 2017–2018)
- 5 November – Antonio Carattoni, 80, captain regent (2006–2007).

== See also ==
- 2026 in Europe
- City states
