= 2023 in San Marino =

- Decades: 2000s; 2010s; 2020s
- See also: History of San Marino; List of years in San Marino

Events in the year 2023 in San Marino.

== Incumbents ==
- Captains Regent:
  - Maria Luisa Berti, Manuel Ciavatta (until 1 April)
  - Alessandro Scarano, Adele Tonnini (from 1 April to 1 October)
  - Gaetano Troina, Filippo Tamagnini (from 1 October)
- Secretary for Foreign and Political Affairs: Luca Beccari

== Events ==
May: The left-wing RETE Civic Movement leaves the current governing coalition, citing a lack of progress on reforms, and moves into the opposition.

June: Two new cabinet ministers, from the PDCS, are appointed as secretaries of state for health and internal affairs, replacing the RETE members who resigned.

25 October: The conference “Welcome to San Marino, a country to discover” is held at the Congress Hall of the Multieventi Sport Domus. Organized by the Tourism Secretariat and San Marino Welcome, it presents San Marino’s history, culture, economy, and tourism opportunities.

=== Sport ===
- 2022–23 Campionato Sammarinese di Calcio
- 2022–23 Coppa Titano

== See also ==
- 2023 in Europe
- City states
