= List of national power transfers in 2023 =

The following is a list of power transfers between national heads of state, heads of government, prime ministers, and other equivalent positions in the year 2023. All countries which act as de facto sovereign states, per the criteria at List of sovereign states, are included.

== Heads of State ==
Head of State Changes in 2023
| Date | Country | Position | Incumbent | Party | Incoming | Party | Cause | Source |
|---|---|---|---|---|---|---|---|---|
| 1 Jan | Brazil | President | Jair Bolsonaro | Liberal Party | Luiz Inácio Lula da Silva | Workers’ Party | Election | |
| 1 Jan | Switzerland | President | Ignazio Cassis | FDP.The Liberals | Alain Berset | Social Democratic Party | Rotation | |
| 18 Jan | Vietnam | President | Nguyễn Xuân Phúc | Communist Party | Võ Thị Ánh Xuân (acting) | Communist Party | Resignation | |
| 28 Feb | Cyprus | President | Nicos Anastiasiades | Democratic Rally | Nikos Christodoulides | Independent | Election | |
| 2 Mar | Vietnam | President | Võ Thị Ánh Xuân (acting) | Communist Party | Võ Văn Thưởng | Communist Party | Indirect election | |
| 20 Mar | Trinidad and Tobago | President | Paula-Mae Weekes | Independent | Christine Kangaloo | People's National Movement | Indirect election | |
| 1 Apr | San Marino | Captains Regent | Maria Luisa Berti | We Sammarinese | Alessandro Scarano | Christian Democratic Party | Indirect election | |
| 1 Apr | San Marino | Captains Regent | Manuel Ciavatta | Christian Democratic Party | Adele Tonnini | RETE Movement | Indirect election | |
| 11 May | Federated States of Micronesia | President | David Panuelo | Independent | Wesley Simina | Independent | Election | |
| 20 May | Montenegro | President | Milo Đukanović | Democratic Party of Socialists | Jakov Milatović | Europe Now! | Election | |
| 29 May | Nigeria | President | Muhammadu Buhari | All Progressives Congress | Bola Tinubu | All Progressives Congress | Election | |
| 8 Jul | Latvia | President | Egils Levits | National Alliance | Edgars Rinkēvičs | Unity | Indirect election | |
| 26 Jul | Niger | President | Mohamed Bazoum | Party for Democracy and Socialism | Abdourahamane Tiani | National Council for the Safeguard of the Homeland | Coup d'état | |
| 15 Aug | Paraguay | President | Mario Abdo Benítez | Red Party | Santiago Peña | Red Party | Election | |
| 30 Aug | Gabon | President | Ali Bongo | Democratic Party | Brice Oligui (acting) | Committee for the Transition and Restoration of Institutions | Coup d'état | |
| 1 Sep | Artsakh | President | Arayik Harutyunyan | Free Motherland | Davit Ishkhanyan (acting) | Armenian Revolutionary Federation | Resignation | |
| 9 Sep | Madagascar | President | Andry Rajoelina | Young Malagasies Determined | Christian Ntsay (acting) | Independent | Resignation | |
| 10 Sep | Artsakh | President | Davit Ishkhanyan (acting) | Armenian Revolutionary Federation | Samvel Shahramanyan | Independent | Indirect election | |
| 14 Sep | Singapore | President | Halimah Yacob | People's Action Party | Tharman Shanmugaratnam | People's Action Party | Election | |
| 1 Oct | San Marino | Captains Regent | Alessandro Scarano | Christian Democratic Party | Filippo Tamagnini | Christian Democratic Party | Indirect election | |
| 1 Oct | San Marino | Captains Regent | Adele Tonnini | RETE Movement | Gaetano Troina | Tomorrow Free Movement | Indirect election | |
| 27 Oct | Madagascar | President | Christian Ntsay (acting) | Independent | Richard Ravalomanana (acting) | Independent | Court decision | |
| 30 Oct | Nauru | President | Russ Kun | Independent | David Adeang | Independent | Confidence failure | |
| 17 Nov | Maldives | President | Ibrahim Mohamed Solih | Democratic Party | Mohamed Muizzu | People's National Congress | Election | |
| 23 Nov | Ecuador | President | Guillermo Lasso | Creating Opportunities | Daniel Noboa | People, Equality, and Democracy | Election | |
| 10 Dec | Argentina | President | Alberto Fernández | Justicialist Party | Javier Milei | Libertarian Party | Election | |
| 16 Dec | Kuwait | Emir | Nawaf Al-Ahmad Al-Jaber Al-Sabah | N/A | Mishal Al-Ahmad Al-Jaber Al-Sabah | N/A | Death | |
| 16 Dec | Madagascar | President | Richard Ravalomanana (acting) | Independent | Andry Rajoelina | Young Malagasies Determined | Election | |

== Heads of Government and Prime Ministers ==
Head of Government Changes in 2023
| Date | Country | Position | Incumbent | Party | Incoming | Party | Cause | Source |
|---|---|---|---|---|---|---|---|---|
| 25 Jan | Bosnia and Herzegovina | Chairman of the Council of Ministers | Zoran Tegeltija | Alliance of Independent Social Democrats | Borjana Krišto | Croatian Democratic Union | Election | |
| 25 Jan | New Zealand | Prime Minister | Jacinda Ardern | Labour Party | Chris Hipkins | Labour Party | Resignation | |
| 1 Feb | Equatorial Guinea | Prime Minister | Francisco Pascual Obama Asue | Democratic Party | Manuela Roka Botey | Democratic Party | Election | |
| 7 Mar | Qatar | Prime Minister | Khalid bin Khalifa bin Abdul Aziz Al Thani | Independent | Mohammed bin Abdulrahman bin Jassim Al Thani | Independent | Appointment | |
| 11 Mar | China | Premier | Li Keqiang | Communist Party | Li Qiang | Communist Party | Resignation | |
| 15 May | Slovakia | Prime Minister | Eduard Heger | Democrats | Ľudovít Ódor | Independent | Resignation | |
| 25 May | Greece | Prime Minister | Kyriakos Mitsotakis | New Democracy | Ioannis Sarmas | Independent | Election | |
| 6 Jun | Bulgaria | Prime Minister | Galab Donev | Independent | Nikolai Denkov | We Continue the Change | Election | |
| 15 Jun | Romania | Prime Minister | Nicolae Ciucă | National Liberal Party | Marcel Ciolacu | Social Democratic Party | Rotation | |
| 20 Jun | Finland | Prime Minister | Sanna Marin | Social Democratic Party | Petteri Orpo | National Coalition Party | Election | |
| 26 Jun | Greece | Prime Minister | Ioannis Sarmas | Independent | Kyriakos Mitsotakis | New Democracy | Election | |
| 1 Jul | East Timor | Prime Minister | Taur Matan Ruak | People's Liberation Party | Xanana Gusmão | National Congress for Reconstruction | Election | |
| 1 Aug | Tunisia | Prime Minister | Najla Bouden | Independent | Ahmed Hachani | Independent | Appointment | |
| 8 Aug | Guinea-Bissau | Prime Minister | Nuno Gomes Nabiam | Assembly of the People United | Geraldo Martins | African Party for Independence | Election | |
| 8 Aug | Niger | Prime Minister | Ouhoumoudou Mahamadou | Party for Democracy and Socialism | Ali Lamine Zeine | Independent | Coup d'état | |
| 14 Aug | Pakistan | Prime Minister | Shehbaz Sharif | Nawaz Muslim League | Anwar ul Haq Kakar | Balochistan People's Party | Resignation | |
| 22 Aug | Cambodia | Prime Minister | Hun Sen | People's Party | Hun Manet | People's Party | Election | |
| 22 Aug | Thailand | Prime Minister | Prayut Chan-o-cha | United Thai Nation Party | Srettha Thavisin | For Thais Party | Election | |
| 4 Sep | Vanuatu | Prime Minister | Ishmael Kalsakau | Union of Moderate Parties | Sato Kilman | People's Progressive Party | Confidence failure | |
| 7 Sep | Gabon | Prime Minister | Alain Claude Billie By Nze | Democratic Party | Raymond Ndong Sima | Independent | Coup d'état | |
| 15 Sep | Latvia | Prime Minister | Krišjānis Kariņš | Unity | Evika Siliņa | Unity | Resignation | |
| 28 Sep | Eswatini | Prime Minister | Cleopas Dlamini | Independent | Mgwagwa Gamedze (acting) | Independent | Resignation | |
| 6 Oct | Vanuatu | Prime Minister | Sato Kilman | People's Progressive Party | Charlot Salwai | Reunification Movement for Change | Confidence failure | |
| 17 Oct | Ivory Coast | Prime Minister | Patrick Achi | Rally of the Republicans | Robert Beugré Mambé | Rally of the Republicans | Appointment | |
| 25 Oct | Slovakia | Prime Minister | Ľudovít Ódor | Independent | Robert Fico | Direction | Election | |
| 31 Oct | Montenegro | Prime Minister | Dritan Abazović | United Reform Action | Milojko Spajić | Europe Now! | Election | |
| 1 Nov | Bhutan | Prime Minister | Lotay Tshering | United Party | Position eliminated | | Resignation | |
| 1 Nov | Bhutan | Chief Advisor | New position | | Dago Rigdzin | Independent | Resignation | |
| 4 Nov | Eswatini | Prime Minister | Mgwagwa Gamedze (acting) | Independent | Russell Dlamini | Independent | Election | |
| 11 Nov | Algeria | Prime Minister | Aymen Benabderrahmane | Independent | Nadir Larbaoui | Independent | Appointment | |
| 17 Nov | Luxembourg | Prime Minister | Xavier Bettel | Democratic Party | Luc Frieden | Christian Social People's Party | Election | |
| 27 Nov | New Zealand | Prime Minister | Chris Hipkins | Labour Party | Christopher Luxon | National Party | Election | |
| 13 Dec | Poland | Prime Minister | Mateusz Morawiecki | Law and Justice | Donald Tusk | Civic Platform | Election | |
| 21 Dec | Guinea-Bissau | Prime Minister | Geraldo Martins | African Party for Independence | Rui Duarte de Barros | Independent | Appointment | |

== See also ==
- List of state leaders in 2023
- List of elections in 2023
- 2023 national electoral calendar
