= 2025 in San Marino =

- Decades: 2000s; 2010s; 2020s
- See also: History of San Marino; List of years in San Marino

Events in the year 2025 in San Marino.

== Incumbents ==
- Captains Regent:
  - Francesca Civerchia, Dalibor Riccardi (until September 30)
  - Matteo Rossi, Lorenzo Bugli (from October 1)
- Secretary for Foreign and Political Affairs: Luca Beccari

== Art and entertainment ==
- San Marino in the Eurovision Song Contest 2025

== Events ==
- April 4 – The Solomon Islands and San Marino formalize diplomatic relations.
- 23 September – San Marino officially recognizes the State of Palestine.
- 1 October – Matteo Rossi and Lorenzo Bugli are sworn in as the new Captains Regents.

== Holidays ==
- 1 January – New Year's Day
- 6 January – Epiphany
- 5 February – Saint Agatha
- 25 March – Anniversary of the Arengo
- 20 April – Easter
- 21 April – Easter Monday
- 1 May – Labour Day
- 19 June – Corpus Christi
- 15 August – Ferragosto
- 3 September – The Feast of Saint Marinus and the Republic
- 1 November – All Saints Day
- 2 November – Commemoration of all those who died at war
- 8 December – Immaculate Conception
- 24 December – Christmas Eve
- 25 December – Christmas Day
- 26 December – Saint Stephen's Day
- 31 December – New Year's Eve

== See also ==
- 2025 in Europe
- City states
