= 2011 in San Marino =

- Decades: 1990s; 2000s; 2010s; 2020s
- See also: History of San Marino; List of years in San Marino

Events in the year 2011 in San Marino.

== Incumbents ==
- Captains Regent:
  - Giovanni Francesco Ugolini, Andrea Zafferani (until 1 April)
  - Maria Luisa Berti, Filippo Tamagnini (from 1 April to 1 October)
  - Gabriele Gatti, Matteo Fiorini (from 1 October)

== Arts and entertainment ==
In music: San Marino in the Eurovision Song Contest 2011.

== Sports ==
Football (soccer) competitions: Campionato Sammarinese di Calcio, Coppa Titano.

== See also ==
- 2011 in Europe
- City states
