= 2022 in San Marino =

- Decades: 2000s; 2010s; 2020s
- See also: History of San Marino; List of years in San Marino

Events in the year 2022 in San Marino.

== Incumbents ==
- Captains Regent:
  - Nicola Selva, Luca Boschi (until 1 April)
  - Oscar Mina, Paolo Rondelli (from 1 April to 1 October)
  - Maria Luisa Berti, Manuel Ciavatta (from 1 October)
- Secretary for Foreign and Political Affairs: Luca Beccari

== See also ==
- 2022 in Europe
- City states
