= 2024 in San Marino =

- Decades: 2000s; 2010s; 2020s
- See also: History of San Marino; List of years in San Marino

Events in the year 2024 in San Marino.

== Incumbents ==
- Captains Regent:
  - Gaetano Troina, Filippo Tamagnini (until 1 April)
  - Alessandro Rossi, Milena Gasperoni (1 April – 1 October)
  - Francesca Civerchia, Dalibor Riccardi (1 October onwards)
- Secretary for Foreign and Political Affairs: Luca Beccari

== Events ==
- 9 June: 2024 San Marino general election: Sammarinese elect the members of the Grand and General Council.
- 5 September: San Marino, the lowest-ranked FIFA-affiliated national team, defeats Liechtenstein 1–0 in Serravalle, to win the team's first competitive victory in their 36-year history.

== Art and entertainment ==
- San Marino in the Eurovision Song Contest 2024

== Holidays ==
- 1 January - New Year's Day
- 6 January - Epiphany
- 5 February - Saint Agatha
- 25 March - Anniversary of the Arengo
- 31 March - Easter
- 1 April - Easter Monday
- 1 May - Labour Day
- 30 May – Corpus Christi
- 15 August – Ferragosto
- 3 September – The Feast of Saint Marinus and the Republic
- 1 November – All Saints Day
- 2 November – Commemoration of all those who died at war
- 8 December – Immaculate Conception
- 24 December – Christmas Eve
- 25 December – Christmas Day
- 26 December – Saint Stephen's Day
- 31 December – New Year's Eve

== See also ==
- 2024 in Europe
- City states
