= 2021 in San Marino =

- Decades: 2000s; 2010s; 2020s
- See also: History of San Marino; List of years in San Marino

Events in the year 2021 in San Marino.

== Incumbents ==
- Captains Regent:
  - Alessandro Cardelli, Mirko Dolcini (until 1 April)
  - Giancarlo Venturini, Marco Nicolini (from 1 April to 1 October)
  - Francesco Mussoni, Giacomo Simoncini (from 1 October)
- Secretary for Foreign and Political Affairs: Luca Beccari

== Events ==
Ongoing – COVID-19 pandemic in San Marino

- San Marino places 22nd in the Eurovision Song Contest final
- San Marino Open 2021 was part of ATP Challenger and held on 9–15 August.
- San Marino legalized abortion in specific cases, if mother's life being in danger or severe fetal abnormalities.

== Deaths ==
- 2 February – Fausta Morganti, politician, former Captain Regent (born 1944).

== See also ==
- 2021 in Europe
- City states
