= LGBTQ rights in San Marino =

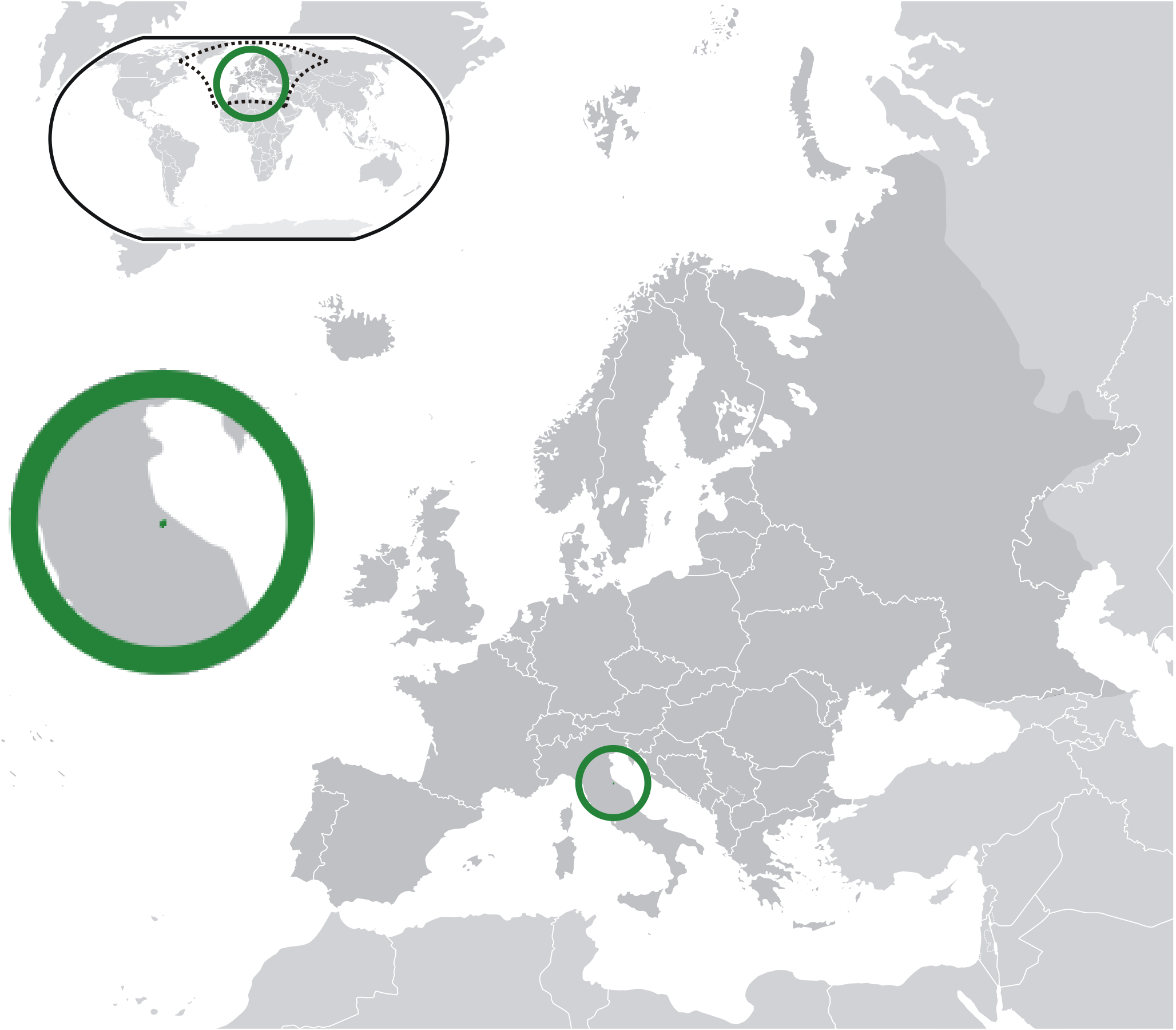
- Location of San Marino (green) in Europe (dark grey) – [Legend]
- Legal status: Legal since 1864 "Habitual" homosexual acts "causing a public scandal" illegal from 1970 to 2004
- Military: LGBT people may serve
- Discrimination protections: Protections for sexual orientation and gender identity

Family rights
- Recognition of relationships: Unregistered cohabitation since 2012 (only for immigration purposes), Civil unions since 2019
- Adoption: Stepchild adoption since 2019

Lesbian, gay, bisexual, transgender and queer (LGBTQ) people in San Marino may face legal challenges not experienced by non-LGBTQ residents. Both male and female same-sex sexual activity are legal in San Marino, but households headed by same-sex couples are not eligible for the same legal protections available to opposite-sex couples.

Discrimination on account of sexual orientation is banned under the 2019 amendments to the constitution of San Marino. In November 2018, the Grand and General Council approved a bill to legalise civil unions. The law, which took effect on 5 December 2018 and became fully operational on 11 February 2019, following a number of further legal and administrative changes, allows same-sex and opposite-sex couples to enter into a union and receive some of the rights and benefits of marriage.

== Legality of same-sex sexual activity ==
Homosexuality was decriminalised in San Marino in 1864.

From 1975 to 2004, Article 274 of the Criminal Code prohibited homosexual acts if they had been engaged in "habitually" and thereby caused "public scandal". The punishment imprisonment for no less than three months and no more one year. There are no reports, however, that Article 274 was ever applied. It was the only special provision on homosexuality in the Sammarinese Penal Code.

Article 274 was eventually repealed in September 2004.

The age of consent is set at 14 for both opposite-sex and same-sex sexual acts. Additionally, it is an offence to "incite a minor under 18 years to sexual corruption".

== Recognition of same-sex relationships ==
=== Civil unions ===
On 15 November 2018, the Grand and General Council approved a bill to legalise civil unions in the microstate. The law, which came into effect on 5 December 2018, became fully operational on 11 February 2019, following a number of further legal and administrative changes. It allows same-sex and opposite-sex couples to enter into a union and receive certain legal rights with respect to residency, citizenship, pension rights, healthcare, succession rights, and stepchild adoption.

=== Same-sex marriage ===
In December 2017, the Grant and General Council approved an amendment to a proposed 2018 budget law that would allow same-sex marriages of foreign couples to be performed in San Marino, with the aim of encouraging tourism. Sammarinese same-sex couples will still be banned from marrying. The government now has the task of drafting legislation to implement the amendment. As of 2024, this does not appear to have happened yet.

== Discrimination protections and hate crime laws ==
On 28 April 2008, the Grand and General Council approved amendments to the Penal Code, outlawing discrimination and hate speech on the basis of sexual orientation. The law took effect on 3 May 2008. The Penal Code also provides penalty enhancements to hate crimes motivated by the victim's sexual orientation.

In November 2018, during the final discussion of the civil union law, Deputy Davide Forcellini of the RETE Movement proposed to explicitly add the term sexual orientation to Article 4 of the Declaration of Citizens' Rights. The proposal received support from the DM-SMT, the Party of Socialists and Democrats (PSD) and the Socialist Party (PS), as well as several independent deputies. In March 2019, the Grand and General Council approved the proposal, 35 votes in favour, 8 against and 1 abstention. However, 39 votes were required. Due to failing to meet this threshold, the text was submitted to a referendum. On 2 June 2019, voters approved the amendment, with 71.46% voting in favour.

Article 4 of the Declaration of Citizens' Rights now reads as follows:

- Tutti sono uguali davanti alla legge, senza distinzioni di sesso, orientamento sessuale, condizioni personali, economiche, sociali, politiche e religiose.
- All are equal before the law, without distinction of sex, sexual orientation, personal, economic, social, political and religious conditions.

In November 2019, during the country's Universal Periodic Review, San Marino accepted recommendations from Liechtenstein, Luxembourg and Mexico to outlaw discrimination on the basis of gender identity.

== Military service ==
The Sammarinese Armed Forces does not explicitly ban LGBTQ people from serving. The code of conduct of the police force prohibits unfair discrimination in recruitment. Furthermore, police officials are trained to properly respond to and identify discrimination, whether in public or within the police force itself.

== Blood donation ==
Gay and bisexual men are allowed to donate blood in San Marino.

== Living conditions ==
Until recently LGBTQ people in San Marino went unnoticed, with very few public debates or discussions involving the issue of LGBTQ rights, either in the media, society in general or politics. When LGBTQ groups in San Marino asked the government to recognize 17 May as the International Day Against Homophobia, Transphobia and Biphobia in the early 2000s, their proposition was rejected.

The country's sex education programme, accompanied by emotional education programmes, expressly provide for knowledge of LGBTQ rights. The "Curriculum of education to citizenship" also provides for knowledge of LGBTQ matters.

There are occasionally reports of violence and hate crimes directed at the LGBTQ community in San Marino. In June 2019, the electorate voted with 71% to outlaw discrimination on the basis of sexual orientation. In 2022, with the election of Paolo Rondelli to the office of Captain Regent, San Marino became the first country in modern history with an openly homosexual head of state.

== Summary table ==
Same-sex sexual activity legal	Yes (Since 1864)
Equal age of consent (14)	Yes (Since 1864)
Anti-discrimination laws in employment	Yes (Since 2008)
Anti-discrimination laws in the provision of goods and services	Yes (Since 2008)
Anti-discrimination laws in all other areas (incl. indirect discrimination, hate speech)	Yes (Since 2008)
All discrimination based on sexual orientation banned by constitution	Yes (Since 2019)
Anti-discrimination laws concerning gender identity in all areas	Yes (Since 2016)
Hate crime law includes sexual orientation	Yes (Since 2008)
Same-sex marriage	No
Recognition of same-sex couples (e.g. civil unions)	Yes (Since 2019)
Stepchild adoption by same-sex couples	Yes (Since 2019)
Joint adoption by same-sex couples	No
LGBTQ people allowed to serve openly in the military	Yes
Right to change legal gender	
Access to IVF for lesbian couples	No
Conversion therapy banned on minors	No
Commercial surrogacy for gay male couples	No
MSMs allowed to donate blood	Yes

== See also ==
- Politics of San Marino
- LGBTQ rights in Europe
