= 2016 in San Marino =

- Decades: 1990s; 2000s; 2010s; 2020s
- See also: History of San Marino; List of years in San Marino

Events from the year 2016 in San Marino.

== Incumbents ==
- Captains Regent:
  - Lorella Stefanelli, Nicola Renzi
  - Massimo Andrea Ugolini, Gian Nicola Berti,
  - Marino Riccardi, Fabio Berardi

== Events ==
- 15 May – Four referendums are held.
- 5–21 August – San Marino at the 2016 Summer Olympics: 4 competitors in 2 sports.
- 20 November – Sammarinese general election, 2016.

== Deaths ==
- 12 May – Giuseppe Maiani, politician, Captain Regent (b. 1924).

== See also ==
- 2016 in Europe
- City states
