= Maria Katia Savoretti =

Sammarinese politician (born 1970)

Maria Katia Savoretti (born 5 September 1970) is a Sammarinese Future Republic politician and bank lawyer, member of the Council of Twelves since 2020 and the Grand and General Council since 2019.

== Early life and education ==
Savoretti was born on 5 September 1970 in City of San Marino, San Marino. She graduated in law from the University of Bologna and completed a postgraduate training course in San Marino law.

== Career ==
In the first direct local elections of 1994, Savoretti was elected mayor of Faetano with the 61.93% of the votes, a position she held until 1999. Between 2009 and 2014, she was secretary of the Montegiardino Municipal Council. Since 2008, Savoretti has been a reviewing member of the Civil Aviation and Maritime Navigation Authority.

She was first elected member of the Grand and General Council in the 2019 general election for Future Republic. Savoretti was re-elected in the 2024 election.

In January 2020 Savoretti was appointed by the Grand and General Council as member of the Council of Twelve, representing her party. She was re-appointed on 22 July 2024.

Alongside Oscar Mina, Savoretti represented San Marino in the Council of Europe's Conference of Presidents of the Parliament that took place in March 2025. In May that year, participated in the third Economic Forum of the Parliamentary Assembly of the Mediterranean, held in Marrakesh, Morocco, where she spoke about Artificial Intelligence and the need for San Marino to adopt specific regulations on the subject and a coordinated global strategy.
