= Guarantors' Panel on the Constitutionality of Rules =

Constitutional court of San Marino

- Collegio Garante della Costituzionalità delle Norme
- Coat of arms of San Marino
- Established: 28 February 2002; 24 years ago
- Jurisdiction: San Marino
- Location: Palazzo Pubblico, Piazza della Libertà, San Marino
- Composition method: Appointed by the Grand and General Council
- Authorised by: Constitutional Revising Law No. 36
- Judge term length: 4 years
- Number of positions: 6
- Website: www.collegiogarante.sm/on-line/home.html

President of the Guarantors' Panel
- Currently: Glaucus Joust
- Since: 14 March 2024

The Guarantors' Panel on the Constitutionality of Rules (Italian: Collegio Garante della Costituzionalità delle Norme) is the highest court of San Marino in matters of constitutional law. The institution was established with Constitutional Revising Law no. 36 of 26 February 2002, which has amended Article 16 of the "Declaration on the Citizens' Rights and Fundamental Principles of San Marino Constitutional Order". The Guarantors' Panel on the Constitutionality of Rules is the youngest body of San Marino constitutional order. Constitutionality review was previously entrusted to the Great and General Council, but throughout the years this solution had presented several limits.

Constitutional Law no. 67 of 27 May 2003 governs the responsibilities of this Panel, while Qualified Law no. 55 of 25 April 2003 disciplines its organisation, incompatibilities, operation, appeal forms and procedures and the effects of its decisions. The Panel is composed of three effective members (one performing the function of President) and three substitute members. All members are elected by a two-thirds majority of the Great and General Council's members from among university professors of legal subjects, magistrates and law graduates with at least twenty years of experience in the field of law.

At least one third of the Panel's members are renewed every two years following the designation, by drawing lots, of two of its members, one effective and one substitute, from among those having served at least for four years during the first mandate. After the first mandate, which lasts 4 years, one third of the Panel's members are renewed every two years. The Guarantors' Panel appoints its President for a two-year term, on the basis of the rotating principle, from among its effective members.

As already pointed out, the functions of the Guarantors' Panel are similar to those of a Constitutional Court and, more precisely, it shall:

- verify the conformity of laws, of regulations having force of law, as well as of customary rules having force of law, with the fundamental principles of the Declaration on the Citizens' Rights or mentioned in it, upon direct request of at least twenty members of the Great and General Council, of the Congress of State, of five Township Councils, of a number of citizens making up at least 1.5% of the electorate and, with reference to proceedings pending before the Republic's courts, upon request of judges or the parties involved;
- decide on the acceptability of referendums proposals;
- decide in case of conflicts between constitutional bodies;
- act as "Regency Syndicate".

== See also ==
- San Marino
- Politics of San Marino
- Grand and General Council
- Constitution of San Marino
