= Massimo Cenci =

Sammarinese politician

Captain Regent of San Marino
- In office 1 April 2009 – 1 October 2009 Serving with Oscar Mina
- Preceded by: Ernesto Benedettini; Assunta Meloni
- Succeeded by: Stefano Palmieri; Francesco Mussoni

Personal details
- Born: 8 June 1967 (age 59) City of San Marino, San Marino
- Party: Freedom List-New Socialist Party
- Education: University of Bologna, University of the Republic of San Marino

Massimo Cenci (born 8 June 1967) is a politician of San Marino. He was Captain Regent of San Marino for the term from 1 April 2009 to October 2009 together with Oscar Mina.

== Biography ==
After studying in San Marino, he earned a degree in economics and business from the University of Bologna. Having become a chartered accountant, he earned two master's degrees from the University of the Republic of San Marino.

Cenci was elected to the Grand and General Council on the Freedom List (Lista della Libertà). In 2005, he was one of the founders of the New Socialist Party.
