= Ernesto Benedettini =

Sammarinese politician

Captain Regent of San Marino
- In office 1 October 2008 – 1 April 2009; Alongside: Assunta Meloni
- Preceded by: Rosa Zafferani; Federico Pedini Amati
- Succeeded by: Massimo Cenci; Oscar Mina
- In office 1 April 1992 – 1 October 1992; Alongside: Germano de Biagi
- Preceded by: Marino Riccardi; Edda Ceccoli
- Succeeded by: Marino Zanotti; Romeo Morri

Personal details
- Born: 5 March 1948 (age 78) City of San Marino, San Marino
- Party: Sammarinese Christian Democratic Party

Ernesto Benedettini (born 5 March 1948) is a politician of San Marino. He was Captain Regent of San Marino for the term from 1 October 2008 to April 2009 together with Assunta Meloni. In March 2009, Meloni and Benedettini joined in the celebrations of the 50th anniversary of the San Marino National Olympic Committee.

He earlier served as Captain Regent from April to October 1992.

Benedettini is a member of the Sammarinese Christian Democratic Party.
