= Glauco Sansovini =

Sammarinese politician (1938–2019)

Captain Regent of San Marino
- In office 1 April 2010 – 1 October 2010 Serving with Marco Conti
- Preceded by: Francesco Mussoni; Stefano Palmieri
- Succeeded by: Giovanni Francesco Ugolini; Andrea Zafferani

Personal details
- Born: 20 May 1938 Rocca San Casciano, Italy
- Died: 21 May 2019 (aged 81) Borgo Maggiore, San Marino
- Party: Sammarinese National Alliance (2001-.2012); Sammarinese Social Right (since 2012)

Glauco Sansovini (20 May 1938 – 21 May 2019) was a Sammarinese politician and one of the Captains Regent of San Marino together with Marco Conti for the semester from 1 April 2010 to 1 October 2010.
