= Marco Conti =

Sammarinese politician

Captain Regent of San Marino
- In office 1 April 2010 – 1 October 2010 Serving with Glauco Sansovini
- Preceded by: Francesco Mussoni; Stefano Palmieri
- Succeeded by: Giovanni Francesco Ugolini; Andrea Zafferani

Personal details
- Born: 14 April 1969 (age 57) Rimini, Italy
- Party: Christian Democratic Party

Marco Conti (born 14 April 1969) is Captain Regent of San Marino together with Glauco Sansovini for the semester from 1 April 2010 to 1 October 2010.
