= Assunta Meloni =

Sammarinese politician (born 1951)

Captain Regent of San Marino
- In office 1 October 2008 – 1 April 2009; Served alongside Ernesto Benedettini
- Preceded by: Rosa Zafferani; Federico Pedini Amati
- Succeeded by: Massimo Cenci; Oscar Mina

Personal details
- Born: 21 April 1951 (age 75) City of San Marino, San Marino
- Party: Future Republic (since 2017); Popular Alliance (until 2017)
- Education: Sapienza University; University of Urbino

Assunta "Tina" Meloni (born 21 April 1951) is a politician of San Marino, a member of the Popular Alliance. She was Captain Regent of San Marino for the term from 1 October 2008 to April 2009 together with Ernesto Benedettini. She was also a member of the Council of Europe.
