= Andrea Zafferani =

Sammarinese politician

Captain Regent of San Marino
- In office 1 October 2010 – 1 April 2011 Serving with Giovanni Francesco Ugolini
- Preceded by: Marco Conti; Glauco Sansovini
- Succeeded by: Maria Luisa Berti; Filippo Tamagnini

Personal details
- Born: 19 December 1982 (age 43) Fiorentino, San Marino
- Party: Popular Alliance (before 2012); Civic 10 (2012–present)

Andrea Zafferani (born 19 December 1982) is a Sammarinese politician, who was a Captain Regent of San Marino together with Giovanni Francesco Ugolini for the semester from 1 October 2010 to 1 April 2011.

== Career ==
In the 2012 general election he ran on the Civic 10 list and was re-elected to the Grand and General Council.
