= Alice Mina =

Sammarinese politician (born 1987)

The Most Excellent Alice Mina

Captain Regent of San Marino
- In office 1 April 2026 – 1 October 2026 Serving with Vladimiro Selva
- Preceded by: Matteo Rossi; Lorenzo Bugli
- Succeeded by: Gerardo Giovagnoli; William Casali

President of the Sammarinese Christian Democratic Party
- Incumbent
- Assumed office 6 December 2024
- Secretary: Gian Carlo Venturini
- Preceded by: Pasquale Valentini

Member of the Grand and General Council
- Incumbent
- Assumed office 2019

Personal details
- Born: 22 April 1987 (age 39) Borgo Maggiore, San Marino
- Party: Sammarinese Christian Democratic Party
- Occupation: Politician

Alice Mina (born 22 April 1987) is a Sammarinese politician and member of the Grand and General Council, the parliament of San Marino. She is affiliated with the Sammarinese Christian Democratic Party (PDCS) and has served in several parliamentary and party roles, including vice president of the PDCS parliamentary group and a member of San Marino's delegation to the Parliamentary Assembly of the Council of Europe.

== Early life and education ==
Mina was born on 22 April 1987 in Borgo Maggiore, San Marino. She obtained a master's degree in international and diplomatic sciences and later worked as an employee before entering politics.

== Political career ==
Mina joined the Sammarinese Christian Democratic Party in 2009. She became active in the party's internal structures and later served on its central council and national leadership bodies.

She was elected to the Grand and General Council of San Marino and has served as vice president of the PDCS parliamentary group. In parliament she has been a member of the permanent council commission for finance and budget and a member of the national group at the Inter-Parliamentary Union.

Mina has also served as a member of the Sammarinese delegation to the Parliamentary Assembly of the Council of Europe, participating in debates on international political issues and human rights.

In December 2024 she was elected president of the central council of the Sammarinese Christian Democratic Party, becoming one of the prominent figures in the party's leadership.
