= Giacomo Simoncini =

Sammarinese politician (born 1994)

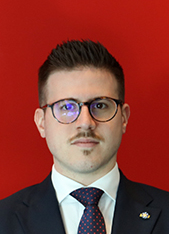

Captain Regent of San Marino
- In office 1 October 2021 – 1 April 2022 Serving with Francesco Mussoni
- Preceded by: Gian Carlo Venturini; Marco Nicolini
- Succeeded by: Oscar Mina; Paolo Rondelli

Personal details
- Born: 30 November 1994 (age 31) Borgo Maggiore, San Marino
- Party: Socialist; Noi per la Repubblica
- Education: University of Bologna; University of the Republic of San Marino; University of Ferrara

Giacomo Simoncini (born 30 November 1994) is a Sammarinese politician, sports executive and pharmacist, who served as the Captain Regent of San Marino with Francesco Mussoni from 1 October 2021 to 1 April 2022. At the time of his appointment, he was the youngest state leader in the world, and was the only head of state younger than the age of 30. A member of the Socialist Party, he has been a member of the Grand and General Council for the electoral alliance Noi per la Repubblica since 2019.

== Biography ==
Simoncini was born and grew up in Borgo Maggiore in San Marino. He graduated in pharmacy and obtained the qualification as a teacher of chemistry.

At the age of 18, he enrolled to the Sammarinese Socialist Party, and a year later became a member of the executive board.

Following the political elections in 2019, Simoncini became a Member of the Grand and General Council for electoral alliance We for the Republic and is a member of the Council of XII and of Council Commissions.

He is also a member of the board of directors of the S.S. Murata since 2017 and team manager of the San Marino national futsal team since 2018. At the same time he is a Rotarian and a president of the Rotaract Club of San Marino.

== See also ==
- List of state leaders by age
