= Giovanni Francesco Ugolini =

Sammarinese politician

Captain Regent of San Marino
- In office 1 October 2010 – 1 April 2011 Serving with Andrea Zafferani
- Preceded by: Marco Conti; Glauco Sansovini
- Succeeded by: Maria Luisa Berti; Filippo Tamagnini
- In office 1 April 2002 – 1 October 2002 Serving with Antonio Lazzaro Volpinari
- Preceded by: Alberto Cecchetti; Gino Giovagnoli
- Succeeded by: Giuseppe Maria Morganti; Mauro Chiaruzzi

Personal details
- Born: 28 February 1953 (age 73) Borgo Maggiore, San Marino
- Party: Christian Democratic Party

Giovanni Francesco Ugolini (born 28 February 1953) was a Captain Regent of San Marino together with Andrea Zafferani for the semester from 1 October 2010 to 1 April 2011. He was previously Captain Regent from 1 April to 1 October 2002.
