= Vladimiro Selva =

Sammarinese politician

Captain Regent of San Marino
- In office 1 April 2026 – 1 October 2026 Serving with Alice Mina
- Preceded by: Matteo Rossi; Lorenzo Bugli
- Succeeded by: Gerardo Giovagnoli; William Casali

Member of the Grand and General Council
- Incumbent
- Assumed office 2012

Personal details
- Born: 19 October 1970 (age 55) San Marino, San Marino
- Party: Libera San Marino
- Other political affiliations: Party of Socialists and Democrats; Democratic Socialist Left
- Education: University of Bologna
- Occupation: Public employee, politician

Vladimiro Selva (born 19 October 1970) is a Sammarinese politician and a member of the Grand and General Council, the unicameral parliament of San Marino. He served as Captain Regent of San Marino from April 2026 to October 2026 along with Alice Mina. He is affiliated with the political party Libera San Marino.

He previously served as a member of the Party of Socialists and Democrats and later Democratic Socialist Left, before joining Libera.

== Early life and education ==
Selva was born on 19 October 1970 in San Marino. He graduated in civil engineering from the University of Bologna.

== Political career ==
Selva began his political activity in 2005 within the Party of Socialists and Democrats following the merger of major left-wing political parties in San Marino.

He first ran in the 2008 Sammarinese general election and was elected to the Grand and General Council in 2012. After deciding not to stand in the 2016 Sammarinese general election for personal reasons, he returned to parliament following the 2019 Sammarinese general election and was later re-elected.

Within the Grand and General Council he has served on parliamentary committees, including the council commission for justice and other institutional bodies.

In March 2026 the leadership of Libera designated Selva as its candidate for Captain Regent for the semester beginning on 1 April 2026.

== Other activities ==
Outside politics, Selva has been involved in sports activities. He previously played football in the Sammarinese football league and later became involved as a coach in the Federazione Sammarinese Sport Speciali.
