= Francesco Mussoni =

Captain Regent of San Marino

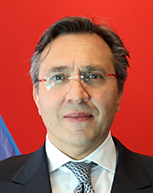
- Mussoni in 2022

Captain Regent of San Marino
- In office 1 October 2021 – 1 April 2022 Serving with Giacomo Simoncini
- Preceded by: Gian Carlo Venturini; Marco Nicolini
- Succeeded by: Oscar Mina; Paolo Rondelli
- In office 1 October 2009 – 1 April 2010 Serving with Stefano Palmieri
- Preceded by: Massimo Cenci; Oscar Mina
- Succeeded by: Marco Conti; Glauco Sansovini

Personal details
- Born: 15 May 1971 (age 55) City of San Marino, San Marino
- Party: Sammarinese Christian Democratic Party
- Education: University of Bologna
- Profession: Lawyer

Francesco Mussoni (born 15 May 1971) is a Sammarinese politician and was a Captain Regent of San Marino together with Stefano Palmieri from 1 October 2009 to 1 April 2010 and a second time together with Giacomo Simoncini from 1 October 2021 to 1 April 2022.

== Career ==
Mussoni as a member of the Sammarinese Christian Democratic Party (PDCS), was in the Grand and General Council from 2001 to 2006 and since November 2008. During his second tenure in office he has become a group leader for the PDCS.

Mussoni is a lawyer (avvocato e notaio). He had studied law at the University of Bologna.

== Honours ==
=== Foreign honours ===
- Monaco : Grand Cross of the Order of Saint-Charles (5 March 2010)
