= Adele Tonnini =

Sanmarinese politician

Captain Regent of San Marino
- In office 1 April 2023 – 1 October 2023 Serving with Alessandro Scarano
- Preceded by: Manuel Ciavatta; Maria Luisa Berti
- Succeeded by: Filippo Tamagnini; Gaetano Troina

Personal details
- Born: 24 June 1977 (age 49) City of San Marino, San Marino
- Party: RETE Movement
- Education: University of Urbino

Adele Tonnini (born 24 June 1977) is a Sammarinese politician who had served alongside Alessandro Scarano as the Captains Regent of San Marino from April 2023 to October 2023. She is a member of RETE Movement.

== Biography ==
Tonnini was born in City of San Marino and graduated the State Art Institute of Urbino and specialising in bookbinding and antique book restoration. After that, she continued her studies in conservation of cultural heritage at the University of Urbino. From 2001 to 2014 she worked at this subject, as the owner of an artisan bookbindery.

She began her political career with the newly created RETE Movement in 2012 and is serving at the Grand and General Council in its XXX legislature since 2019. She is a delegate for San Marino at the World Food Programme and a member of the permanent Justice Commission and is passionate about environmental issues, she loves animals and her hobbies include painting, travel and engines.

On 17 March 2023, the Grand and General Council elected her and Alessandro Scarano as Captains Regent of San Marino to serve from 1 April 2023 to 1 October 2023.
