= Lorenzo Bugli =

Sammarinese politician (born 1995)

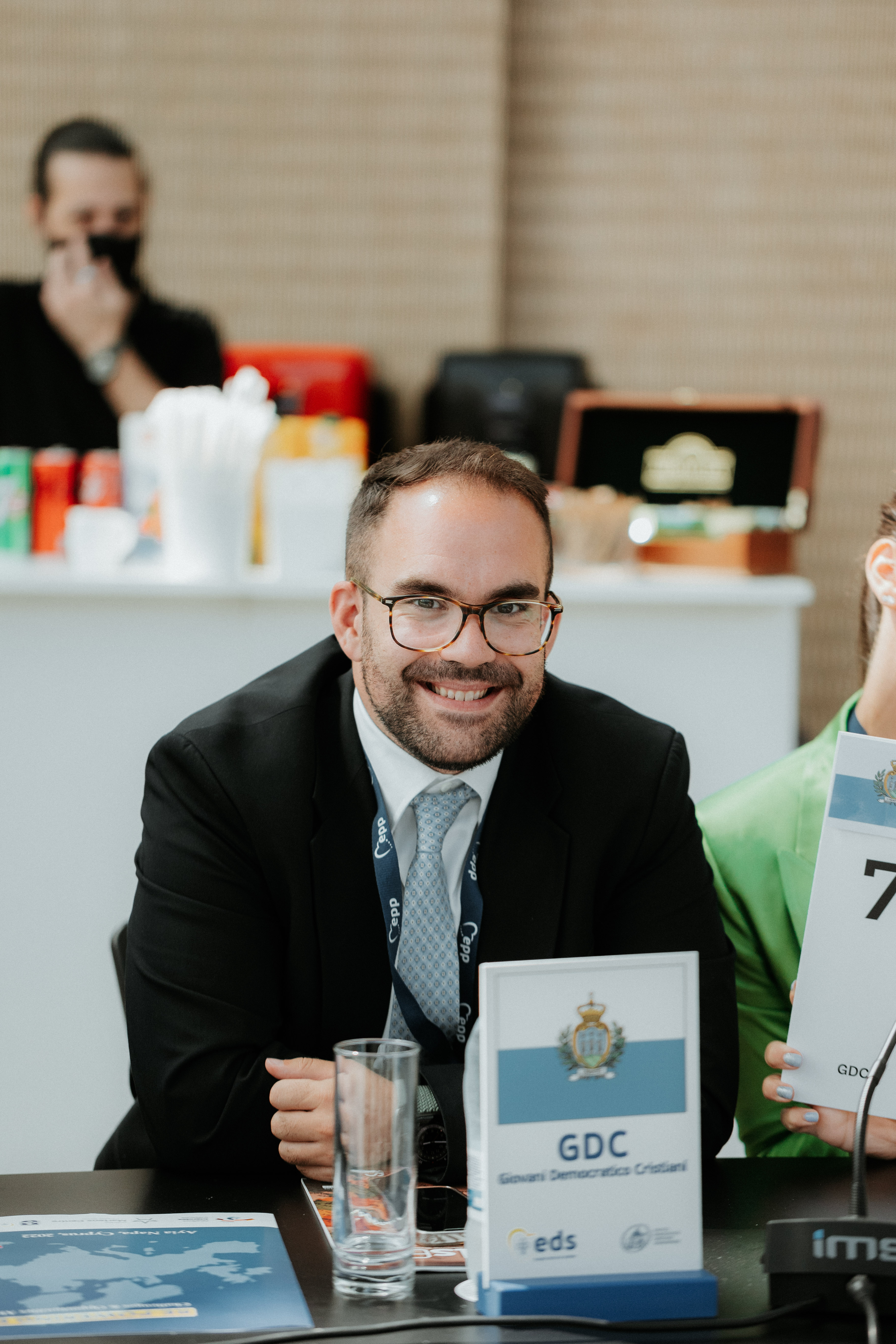
- Bugli in 2022

Captain Regent of San Marino
- In office 1 October 2025 – 1 April 2026 Serving with Matteo Rossi
- Preceded by: Denise Bronzetti; Italo Righi
- Succeeded by: Alice Mina; Vladimiro Selva

Member of the Grand and General Council
- Incumbent
- Assumed office 8 December 2019

Personal details
- Born: 20 February 1995 (age 31) Borgo Maggiore, San Marino
- Party: PDCS
- Profession: Politician

Lorenzo Bugli (born 20 February 1995) is a Sammarinese politician who served as a Captain Regent along with Matteo Rossi from October 2025 to April 2026. He is a member of the Sammarinese Christian Democratic Party.

== Biography ==
Bugli was born on 20 February 1995 in Borgo Maggiore, San Marino. He has received a diploma in accounting. He has studied at the Institute of Philosophical Studies in Lugano, Switzerland, and works in insurance. Outside of politics, Bugli is a football fan and became president of the club SS Murata in 2025.

A member of the Sammarinese Christian Democratic Party (Partito Democratico Cristiano Sammarinese, PDCS), Bugli entered politics in 2013. He ran for the town council of the City of San Marino in 2014 on a platform of relocating the city's health clinic, increasing Wi-Fi, and providing support for events taking place in the city. He won election, aged only 18 at the time. Bugli served five years as President of the Young Christian Democrats in San Marino, and in 2019 he was elected to the Grand and General Council. He has also served as a member of his party's board of directors since 2017.

Bugli has served as president of San Marino's delegation to the Inter-Parliamentary Union and as vice president of Centrist Democrat International, also helping create the latter's youth wing which he leads since the 14 July 2026. He is a member of the Joint Committee for the Association Agreement with the European Union. In 2024, he was re-elected to the Grand and General Council.

On 10 September 2025, he was unanimously nominated by his party to serve as one of the next Captains Regent, along with Matteo Rossi of the Party of Socialists and Democrats (PSD). His term as Captain Regent began on 1 October and ran through 1 April 2026.
