= Oscar Mina =

Sammarinese politician (born 1958)

Captain Regent of San Marino
- In office 1 April 2022 – 1 October 2022 Serving with Paolo Rondelli
- Preceded by: Giacomo Simoncini; Francesco Mussoni
- Succeeded by: Maria Luisa Berti; Manuel Ciavatta
- In office 1 April 2009 – 1 October 2009 Serving with Massimo Cenci
- Preceded by: Ernesto Benedettini; Assunta Meloni
- Succeeded by: Stefano Palmieri; Francesco Mussoni

Personal details
- Born: 24 September 1958 (age 67) Serravalle, San Marino
- Party: Sammarinese Christian Democratic Party
- Education: University of Urbino

Oscar Mina (born 24 September 1958) is a Sammarinese politician, who served as Captain Regent of San Marino with Paolo Rondelli from 1 April to 1 October 2022. He previously served as Captain Regent from 1 April 2009 to October 2009 with Massimo Cenci.

Mina was elected to the Grand and General Council as a member of the Sammarinese Christian Democratic Party in 2006.

== Life ==
In 1979, Oscar Mina graduated in electrical engineering and subsequently studied political science at the University of Urbino. Since 1979, he has been a civil servant in San Marino's water and gas supply. Mina is single and lives in Serravalle.

== Politics ==
Mina joined the Christian Democratic PDCS in 1998. He was elected in 2006, 2008 and 2012 in the Grand and General Council, the parliament of San Marino. From 2006 to 2007, he was a member of the Finance Committee and the Interparliamentary Commission. Since 2007, he is a member of the Judiciary Committee. He has been a member of the OSCE Parliamentary Assembly since 2008, and has headed the San Maritime Delegation since 2009. Mina is a Deputy Chairman of the PDCS since 2008. For the period from 1 April 2009 to 1 October 2009, Oscar Mina was elected as the Captains Regent, head of San Marino, along with Massimo Cenci. On 28 April 2011, he was the successor of the resigned Christian Democratic Party in San Marino. After the 2012 election, he was confirmed in this office. In the 28th legislative term from December 2012, Mina is the chair of the Health Committee and the San Marines delegation to the OSCE Parliamentary Assembly.
