= Matteo Rossi (politician) =

Sammarinese politician and former footballer (born 1986)

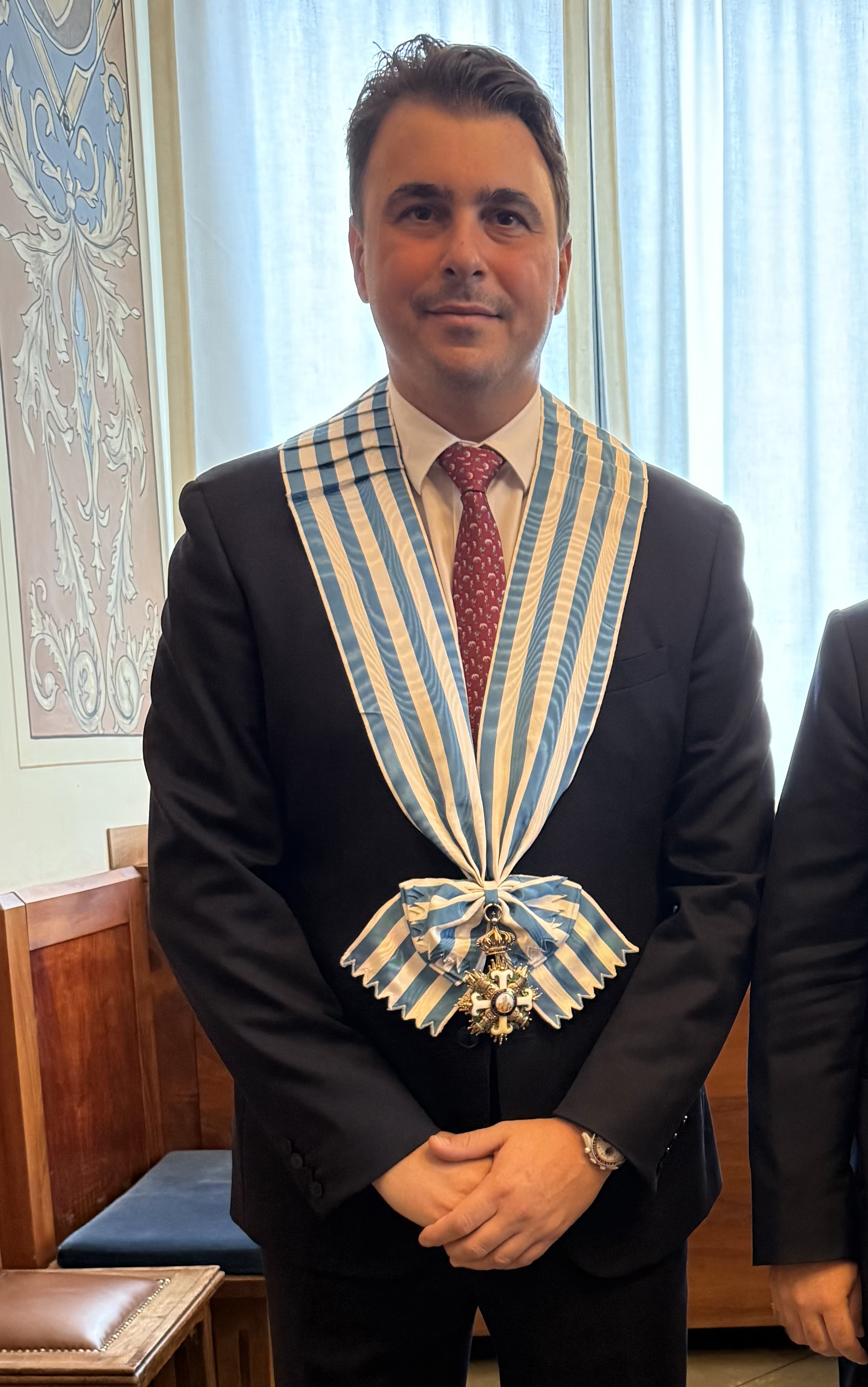
- Rossi in 2025

Captain Regent of San Marino
- In office 1 October 2025 – 1 April 2026 Serving with Lorenzo Bugli
- Preceded by: Denise Bronzetti; Italo Righi
- Succeeded by: Alice Mina; Vladimiro Selva

Personal details
- Born: 9 July 1986 (age 40) Rimini, Italy
- Party: PSD
- Education: University of Bologna
- Profession: Politician
Association football career
- Position: Midfielder
Senior career*
Years	Team	Apps	(Gls)
2005–2007	FC Domagnano		
2007–2016	SP Tre Penne		
2016–2017	SC Faetano		
International career
- San Marino U19
- San Marino U21
- * Club domestic league appearances and goals

Matteo Rossi (born 9 July 1986) is a Sammarinese politician and former footballer who is a Captain Regent in office from 1 October 2025 to 1 April 2026 along with Lorenzo Bugli. He is a member of the Party of Socialists and Democrats (PSD) and previously played football for FC Domagnano, SP Tre Penne and SC Faetano.

== Biography ==
Rossi was born on 9 July 1986. He attended the University of Bologna in Italy, where he graduated in 2011 with a degree in communication sciences. He has two children. Rossi has played footballer as a midfielder. He played for FC Domagnano from 2005 to 2007, for SP Tre Penne from 2007 to 2016, and for SC Faetano from 2016 to 2017. As a member of SP Tre Penne, he was a member of two championship teams in 2012 and 2013 and won a federal trophy. Rossi has appeared in matches in the UEFA Champions League and the UEFA Europa League. He has played for the San Marino national under-19 football team and the San Marino national under-21 football team. Rossi is also a sports journalist and a member of the San Marino Sports Press Association.

Rossi became a member of the Party of Socialists and Democrats (PSD) in 2012 and has served as the group's president. He won election to the Grand and General Council in 2019 and won re-election in 2024. He is the PSD Council Group Leader and a member of the San Marino delegation to the Inter-Parliamentary Union. In August 2025, Rossi was nominated by his party to serve as one of the next Captains Regent, for the term from 1 October 2025 to 1 April 2026, serving alongside Lorenzo Bugli of the Sammarinese Christian Democratic Party.
