= Gerardo Giovagnoli =

Sammarinese politician

Captain Regent of San Marino
- Incumbent
- Assumed office 1 October 2026 Serving with William Casali
- Preceded by: Alice Mina; Vladimiro Selva

Personal details
- Born: 31 May 1976 (age 50)
- Party: Party of Socialists and Democrats

Gerardo Giovagnoli is a Sammarinese politician who is currently Captain Regent. He assumed office alongside William Casali on 1 October 2026.

== Biography ==
Giovagnoli was born in San Marino in 1976. He works as an electric engineer.

He served in the Great and General Council from 2012 to 2016 and again from 2019.
