= Alessandro Scarano =

Sanmarinese politician

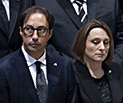

Captain Regent of San Marino
- In office 1 April 2023 – 1 October 2023 Serving with Adele Tonnini
- Preceded by: Manuel Ciavatta; Maria Luisa Berti
- Succeeded by: Filippo Tamagnini; Gaetano Troina

Personal details
- Born: 3 September 1983 (age 43) Borgo Maggiore, San Marino
- Party: Christian Democratic Party
- Education: University of Bologna

Alessandro Scarano (born 3 September 1983) is a Sammarinese politician who was one of two Captains Regent (heads of government for San Marino) from 1 April 2023 until 1 October 2023. He served alongside Adele Tonnini.

== Biography ==
Scarano was born in Borgo Maggiore and has a degree in law from the University of Bologna.

He is a member of the Sammarinese Christian Democratic Party since 2002. He served in the XXVII legislature of the Grand and General Council from 2008 to 2012 and again in the XXX legislature since 2019. He is a member of the Foreign and Internal Affairs Commissions and is passionate about travel, art and archaeology. He practised horse riding at a competitive level, winning the San Marino championship.

On 17 March 2023, the Grand and General Council elected him and Adele Tonnini as Captains Regent of San Marino to serve from 1 April 2023 to 1 October 2023.
