= Constitution of San Marino =

Uncodified constitution of San Marino

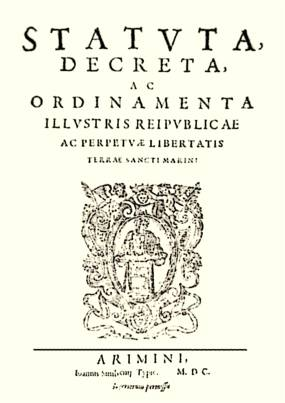
The Statutes of 1600 are one of the core constitutional texts of San Marino

The constitution of the Republic of San Marino is distributed over a number of legislative instruments, the most important of which are the Statutes of 1600 and the Declaration of Citizen Rights of 1974, as amended in 2002.

The constitutional system shows influences of Roman customary law and Justinian I's Corpus Juris Civilis (529–534).

It is the world's oldest surviving constitution of any sovereign state, barring England's Magna Carta (1215).

== The Statutes of 1600 ==
The current legal system of the San Marino began on 8 October 1600. The government gave binding force to a compilation of Statuti written by Camillo Bonelli, covering the institutions and practices of Sammarinese government and justice at that time. It was written in Latin and contained in six books. The title in Latin is Statuta Decreta ac Ordinamenta Illustris Reipublicae ac Perpetuae Libertatis Terrae Sancti Marini.

The new system was an update on the Statuti Comunali (Town Statute) which had served San Marino from about 1300. Existing institutions, such as the Council of the Sixty, were carried forward from this period. The Statutes form the basis of all law in effect today, and so it may be the oldest constitution of any existing nation.

=== Book One ===
The first book contains 62 articles. It is constitutional in character and describes the various councils of San Marino, courts, a number of administrative positions, including the Captains-Regent, and the powers assigned to them. The last two articles explain how the law is to be interpreted and altered, including how the law is to be promulgated.

=== Book Two ===
The second book, called Civilium Causarum, contains 75 articles. The first half provides for civil law procedures covering subpoenas, evidence, examination of witnesses and judicial expenses. The second half covers minors, education, the salaries of the civil service and wills. There is a section which promotes compromise to resolve disputes and another which regulates the salary of lawyers.

=== Book Three ===
The third book, called Maleficiorum, contains 74 articles and covers criminal law. Prosecution of criminal acts is reserved for the state alone. The laws provide a formula by which a punishment shall be proportional to the offense and any mitigating circumstances. Special attention is given to protecting the assets of the state and church, and to preventing the pollution of water sources.

=== Book Four ===
The fourth book, called De Appellationibus, contains 15 articles. The volume explains how judges are nominated, the classification of sentences, appeals and appellant guarantees.

=== Book Five ===
The fifth book, called Extraordinarium, contains 46 articles covering a range of topics. These include the sale of meat, sanitation and health, water reserves and roads.

=== Book Six ===
The sixth book contains 42 articles and covers compensation, weights and plant cultivation. In particular, it explains that family heads are responsible for the actions of their sons and any servants.

== Declaration of Citizen Rights ==
On 12 July 1974 the Captains-Regent signed a law (59/1974) adopted by the Grand and General Council containing a declaration of citizen rights and the fundamental principles of the juridical order of San Marino. The Declaration begins with a repudiation of war. It states the people are sovereign and explains how the separation of powers doctrine is applicable to San Marino. Citizens are guaranteed certain rights including equality, inviolability, freedom, and universal suffrage.

Jorri Duursma describes the 1974 law as the fundamental law of the Republic.

The Declaration was amended in 2002, providing further constitutional detail on the organisation of government and establishing the Guarantors’ Panel on the Constitutionality of Rules, which is a court responsible for assessing the compliance of laws with respect to the Declaration of Rights.

== See also ==
- History of San Marino
- Politics of San Marino
- List of national constitutions
- Guarantors’ Panel on the Constitutionality of Rules
