= William Casali =

Sammarinese politician

Captain Regent of San Marino
- Incumbent
- Assumed office 1 October 2026 Serving with Gerardo Giovagnoli
- Preceded by: Alice Mina; Vladimiro Selva

Personal details
- Born: 15 November 1976 (age 49)
- Party: Sammarinese Christian Democratic Party

William Casali is a Sammarinese politician who is currently Captain Regent. He assumed office alongside Gerardo Giovagnoli on 1 October 2026.

== Biography ==
Casali was president of San Marino RTV from 2016 to 2018. He has been a member of the Grand and General Council since 2019.
