= 2016 San Marino referendum =

Four referendums were held in San Marino on 15 May 2016. Three of the four proposals were approved, including one to abolish the requirement for a vote to receive a quorum of 25% of eligible voters to vote yes to pass. A repeal of law 137, which related to economic development, was the only one rejected.

== Proposals ==
The first referendum was to changing the voting system so that voters cast a vote for their preferred candidate, as opposed to the current system for voting for a party or coalition list.

The second referendum was to repeal law 137 which modified the 1992 law on economic development. Law 137 had previously been passed by parliament on 7 August 2015.

The third referendum was to abolish the quorum required for referendum proposals to be approved. The requirement had previously been lowered from 32% to 25%. The requirement had previously caused referendums that had a majority to fail due to low voter turnout.

The fourth referendum was to cap salaries for the public sector at €100,000 a years.

== Background ==
Referendums in San Marino require 25% of eligible voters to vote yes to pass. People who are citizens of San Marino but live abroad can not vote. Despite this, referendums which affect them can be proposed.

Committees were allowed to campaign for and against the referendums beginning on 1 May 2016, fifteen days before the vote.

== Results ==
Voting was held on 15 May 2016. Each referendum was held on its own ballot that had to be submitted individually. All but one referendum was approved. Following the passage of the third referendum, San Marino's quorum requirement was abolished.

Question	For		Against		Invalid/ blank	Total votes	Registered voters	Turnout	Quorum	Ref.
Question	Votes	%	Votes	%	Invalid/ blank	Total votes	Registered voters	Turnout	Quorum	Ref.
Single preference voting	8,688	54.76	7,177	45.24	244	16,109	33,896	47.52	25.63	
Repealing law 137	7,854	49.65	7,957	50.35	310	16,112	33,896	47.53	23.14	
Abolishing the 25% quorum	9,274	58.58	6,558	41.42	279	16,111	33,896	47.53	27.36	
Capping public sector salaries	10,093	63.63	5,770	36.37	250	16,113	33,896	47.54	29.78	
