= Gaetano Troina =

Sammarinese politician (born 1987)

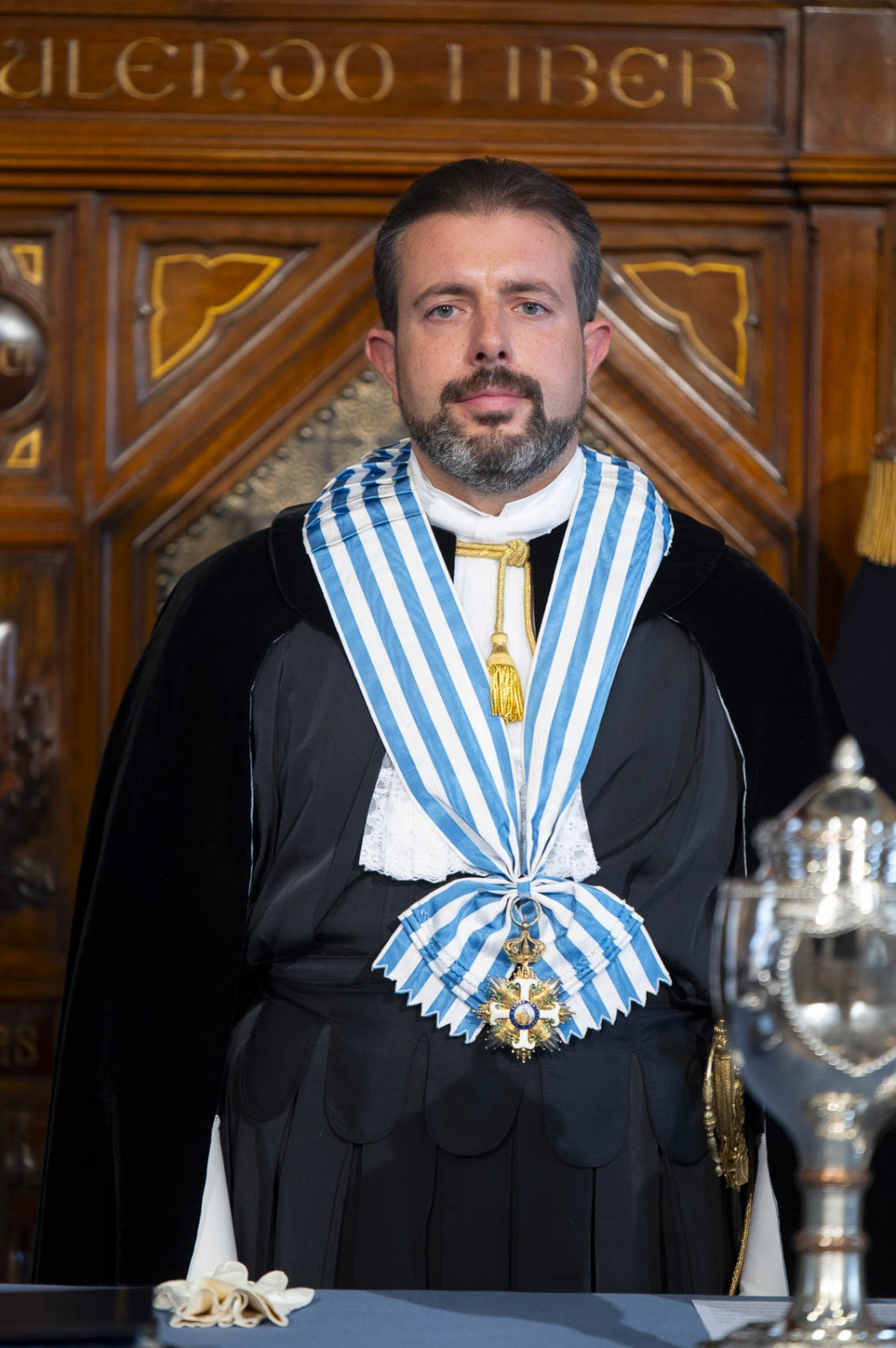
- Official portrait, 2023

Captain Regent of San Marino
- In office 1 October 2023 – 1 April 2024 Serving with Filippo Tamagnini
- Preceded by: Alessandro Scarano; Adele Tonnini
- Succeeded by: Alessandro Rossi; Milena Gasperoni

Member of the Grand and General Council
- Incumbent
- Assumed office 2019

Personal details
- Born: 14 February 1987 (age 39) Borgo Maggiore, San Marino
- Party: Domani Motus Liberi
- Education: University of Bologna, University of the Republic of San Marino
- Profession: Lawyer and notary

Gaetano Troina (born 14 February 1987) is a Sammarinese politician, director of the press office of the political party Domani Motus Liberi, member of the Grand and General Council. He served as captain regent of San Marino alongside Filippo Tamagnini from October 2023 to April 2024.

== Life ==
Troina was born in Borgo Maggiore. He is a lawyer and a notary, and studied law at the University of Bologna and the University of the Republic of San Marino. Troina become a one among founding members the party Domani Motus Liberi on 28 April 2018. The newly founded party presents itself to the press on 26 June 2018. He participated at the 2019 San Marino general election and was elected as a member of the Grand and General Council. In September 2023 he was designated by his party as the next Captain Regent (head of government for San Marino).

== Publications ==
Gaetano Troina on 16 December 2011 presented to the press his publication, entitled "L'evoluzione della disciplina del matrimonio e della famiglia nella Repubblica di San Marino", published by Maretti Editore.
