= Piazza della Libertà, San Marino =

Square in San Marino

Coordinates: 43.9365°N 12.4467°E

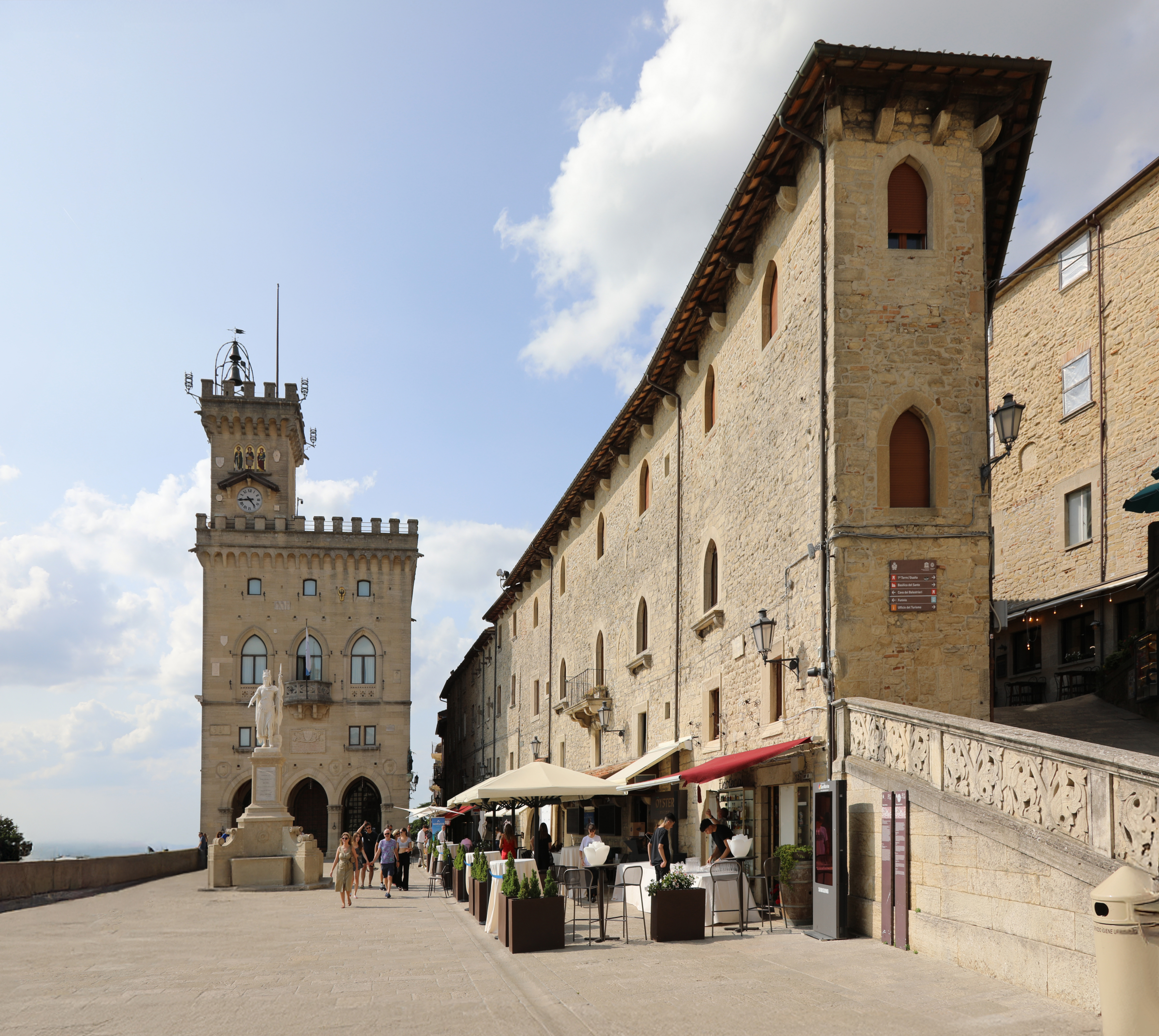
Piazza della Libertà

Piazza della Libertà (Italian pronunciation: [ˈpjattsa della liberˈta]) is a city square in San Marino.

== Buildings around the square ==
- Palazzo Pubblico (San Marino)
- Statua della Libertà
