= Manuel Ciavatta =

Sanmarinese politician

- Ciavatta in 2023

Captain Regent of San Marino
- In office 1 October 2022 – 1 April 2023 Serving with Maria Luisa Berti
- Preceded by: Oscar Mina; Paolo Rondelli
- Succeeded by: Alessandro Scarano; Adele Tonnini

Personal details
- Born: 27 December 1976 (age 49) City of San Marino, San Marino
- Party: Christian Democratic Party
- Education: University of Bologna

Manuel Ciavatta (born 27 December 1976) is a Sammarinese politician who was as one of two Captains Regent (heads of government for San Marino) from 1 October 2022 until 1 April 2023. He served alongside Maria Luisa Berti.

== Biography ==
Ciavatta was born in City of San Marino and has a degree in civil engineering from the University of Bologna, but also a bachelor's degree in Sacred Theology.

He is a member of the Sammarinese Christian Democratic Party, where he serves as deputy political secretary. He served in the XXVIII legislature of the Grand and General Council from 2012 to 2016 and again in the XXX legislature since 2019. He is passionate about teaching and education and serves as a professor of physics and technology at the Center for Professional Training and Technical Education at the Fonte dell’Ovo Middle School.

On 16 September 2022, the Grand and General Council elected him and Maria Luisa Berti as Captains Regent of San Marino to serve from 1 October 2022 to 1 April 2023.
