= Paolo Rondelli =

Sammarinese politician (born 1963)

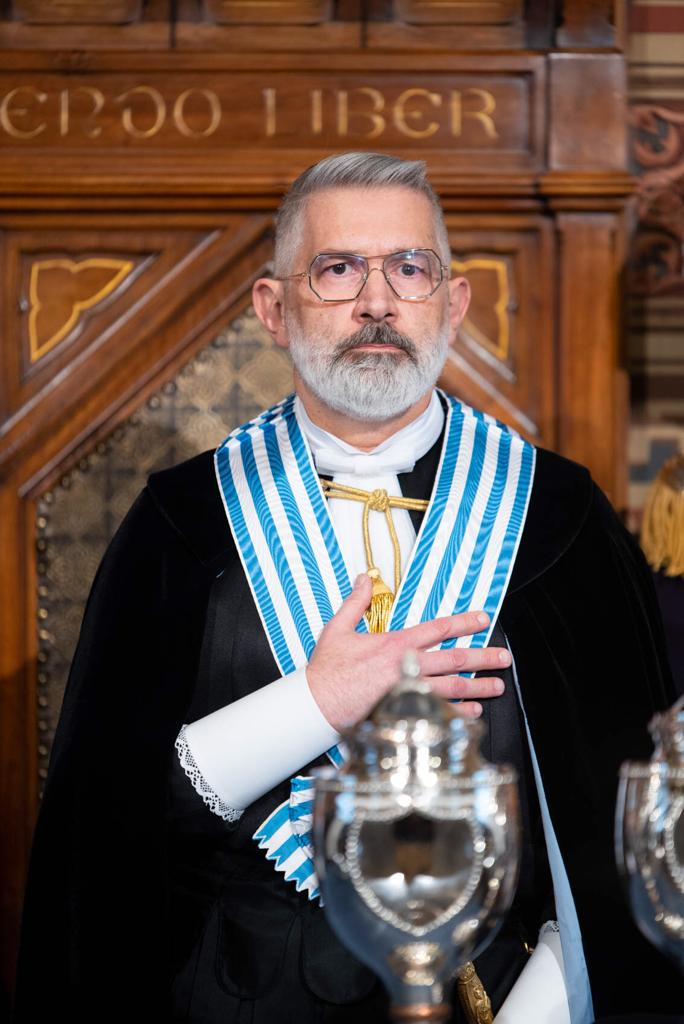
- Rondelli in 2022

Sammarinese Ambassador to Australia
- Incumbent
- Assumed office February 2026
- Preceded by: Office established

Captain Regent of San Marino
- In office 1 April 2022 – 1 October 2022 Serving with Oscar Mina
- Preceded by: Giacomo Simoncini; Francesco Mussoni
- Succeeded by: Maria Luisa Berti; Manuel Ciavatta

Sammarinese Ambassador to the United States
- In office 25 July 2007 – October 2016
- Preceded by: Office established
- Succeeded by: Damiano Beleffi

Personal details
- Born: 17 June 1963 (age 63) City of San Marino, San Marino
- Party: RETE Movement
- Education: University of Bologna

Paolo Rondelli (born 17 June 1963) is a Sammarinese politician and diplomat who served as Captain Regent of San Marino alongside Oscar Mina from 1 April to 1 October 2022.

== Career ==
Born in San Marino on 17 June 1963, Rondelli studied chemical engineering at the University of Bologna and graduated in 1990 with a thesis on "Risks associated with the transport of toxic substances". In 1994 and 1995, he studied environmental science and technology, also at the University of Bologna. In May 2010, Rondelli obtained a Master's in Journalism from a programme run by the Universities of Urbino and Tor Vergata in Rome. In the same year, Rondelli graduated from the Faculty of Humanities of the University of Bologna with a thesis entitled "Democracies in transition: state of young and old, heritage of the future".

As an engineer, Rondelli specialised in environmental and sustainable development issues and worked as a junior engineer for SOL SpA Group in Italy from March 1989 to March 1990 and then as a junior engineer for ENI Group from May 1991 to July 1993. In 1993, he joined the San Marinese administration and was first employed as an expert in technology and environment at the Institute of Social Security and Health, where he worked from July 1993 to November 1998. He was then transferred to the Department of Corporate Services, where he remained until July 2001. In that month, he was appointed Coordinator of the Department of Territory.

Just one month before his transfer in November 1998, Rondelli was appointed Chairman of the Board of the Azienda Autonoma di Stato di Produzione (Ministry of Public Works). He held this post until November 2003. In July 2001, midway through his term as Chairman, Rondelli was also appointed Head of the Department for Planning, Environment and Agriculture of the Republic of San Marino and Chief of Staff to the Minister of Labour. He remained in this position until October 2003, when he became head of the Department of Prevention and Protection, Public Administration and Civil Protection. From April 2005 to August 2006, Paolo Rondelli was Head of the Department for Foreign and Political Affairs, Economic Planning and Justice of the Republic of San Marino and Chief of Staff to the Minister. As such, he was also his nation's representative at the UN General Assembly in New York in September 2005, the UNESCO General Assembly in Paris (France) in October 2005 and the UNESCO World Heritage Committee in Vilnius (Lithuania) in July 2006.

Since April 2005, Rondelli has been a member of the San Marino delegation to the Congress of Local and Regional Authorities of the Council of Europe. In this capacity, he was a member of the election observation missions to Azerbaijan (October 2006 and December 2009), Moldova (December 2006, March 2007 and March 2008), Albania (February 2007), Kosovo (November 2007 and December 2008), Serbia (January 2007 and May 2008), Armenia (September 2008 and June 2009), Israel (November 2008) and Macedonia (March 2009). Finally, Rondelli joined the Steering Committee on Local and Regional Democracy and the Committee of Experts on Democratic Participation and Public Ethics at the Local and Regional Level of the Council of Europe in 2005.

From October 2006 to May 2007, Rondelli was Special Representative of the Chairman of the Committee of Ministers for Serbia and Montenegro to the Council of Europe and Rapporteur for the Committee on Sustainable Development from April 2005 to May 2010.

From 25 July 2007 to October 2016, Rondelli was an ambassador from San Marino to the United States. He presented his credentials to President George W. Bush on July 25, 2007. According to the U.S. State Department, the two countries are "on excellent terms".

Since 2019, he has been a member of the San Marinese Parliament for the RETE Movement.

In March 2022 Rondelli was elected as one of the two new Captains Regent of San Marino, to serve from 1 April 2022 to 1 October 2022, becoming the first openly LGBTQ+ head of state in the world.

== Honours ==
- Order pro Merito Melitensi (Sovereign Military Order of Malta, 2000)
- Order of Merit of the Italian Republic (Italy, 2006)
- Ordre des Palmes académiques (France, 2007)

== See also ==
- List of openly LGBT heads of state and government
