= Filippo Tamagnini =

Sammarinese politician (born 1972)

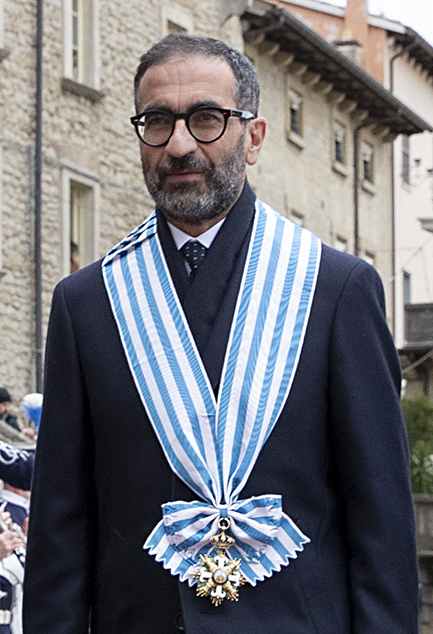

Captain Regent of San Marino
- In office 1 October 2023 – 1 April 2024 Serving with Gaetano Troina
- Preceded by: Alessandro Scarano; Adele Tonnini
- Succeeded by: Alessandro Rossi; Milena Gasperoni
- In office 1 April 2011 – 1 October 2011 Serving with Maria Luisa Berti
- Preceded by: Giovanni Francesco Ugolini; Andrea Zafferani
- Succeeded by: Gabriele Gatti; Matteo Fiorini

Personal details
- Born: 30 January 1972 (age 54) City of San Marino, San Marino
- Party: Sammarinese Christian Democratic Party
- Education: University of Bologna

Filippo Tamagnini (born 30 January 1972) is a Sammarinese politician serving as Captain Regent with Gaetano Troina for the October 2023 to April 2024 political term. He previously served from April to October 2011, sharing the post with Maria Luisa Berti.

== Biography ==
Tamagnini is married to Tania Ercolani and has three children. He lives in Falciano. He graduated as a surveyor at the "Belluzzi" technical institute in Rimini and later graduated in construction engineering at the University of Bologna. He was first an employee of a private technical firm, then in 2000 he joined the planning office, land department, as an expert in particular in the road and hydrogeological reclamation sector.

In 2000 Tamagnini joined the Sammarinese Christian Democratic Party and became a member of the Castello di Serravalle Council from 2003 to 2008. During 2008–2011 he held the position of Captain as a replacement. In 2008 he was elected to the Grand and General Council, where he was a member of the Health and Territory Commission of the Permanent Commission on Justice Affairs and of the Secretariat Office.
