= Ferragosto =

Public holiday in Italy

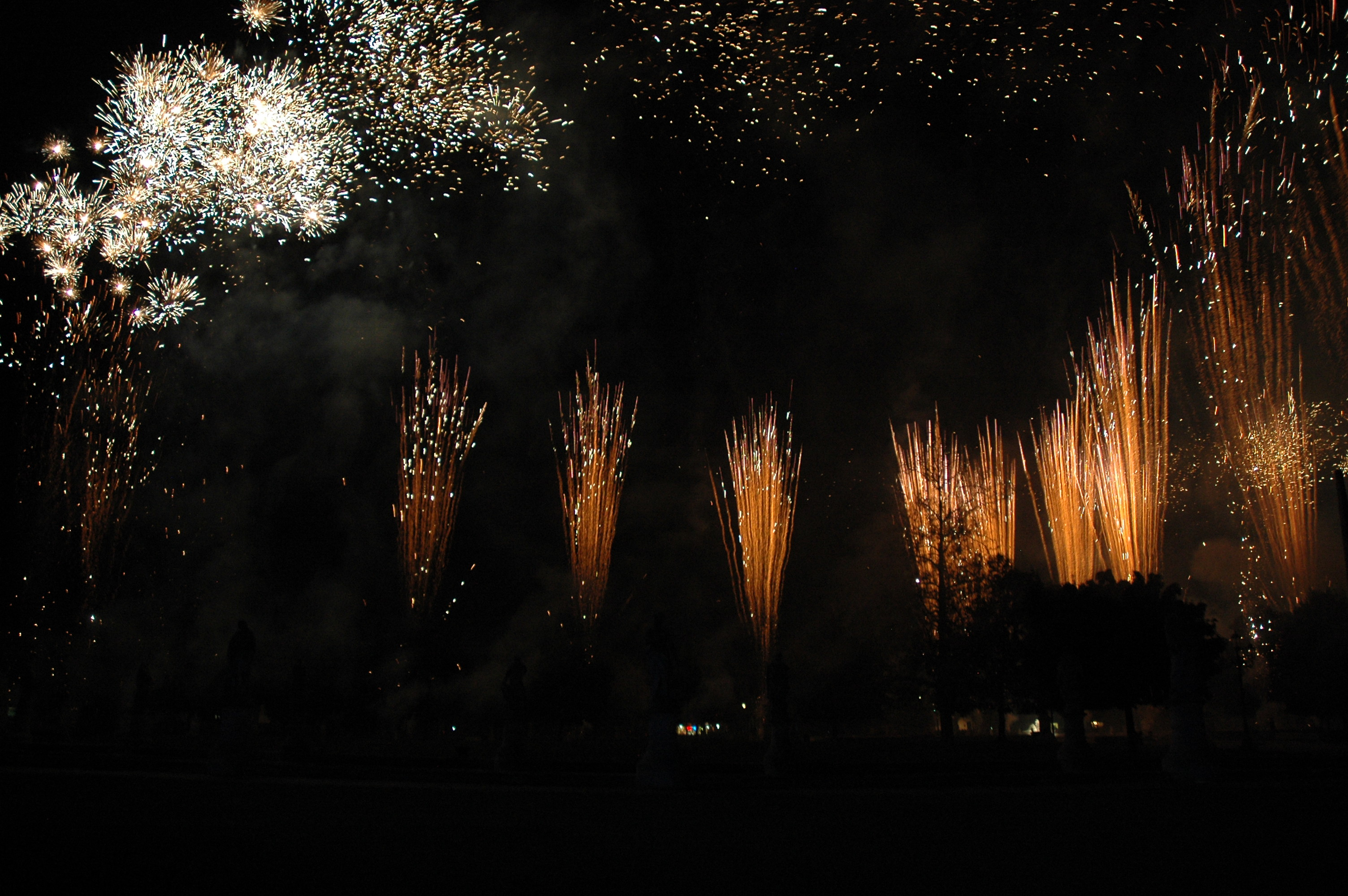
- Ferragosto fireworks display in Padua, Veneto
- Observed by: Italians, Sammarinese and Italian Switzerland
- Significance: Public feast; Catholic feast of the Assumption of Mary
- Date: 15 August
- Next time: 15 August 2026
- Frequency: Annual

Ferragosto is the popular Italian name of the public holiday of the Catholic feast of the Assumption of Mary celebrated on 15 August. It originates from Feriae Augusti, the festival of Emperor Augustus, who made 1 August a day of rest after weeks of hard work on the agricultural sector. It became a custom for the workers to wish their employers buon Ferragosto and receive a monetary bonus in return. This became law during the Roman Renaissance throughout the Papal States. As the festivity was created for political reasons, the Catholic Church decided to move the festivity to 15 August, which is the Assumption of Mary allowing them to include this in the festivity.

This festivity was used by Benito Mussolini to give the lower classes the possibility to visit cultural cities or go to the seaside for one to three days, from 14 August to the 16th, by creating "holiday trains" with extremely low cost tickets, for this holiday period. Food and board was not included, which is why even today Italians associate packed lunches and barbecues with this day. By metonymy, it is also the summer vacation period around mid-August, which may be a long weekend (ponte di Ferragosto) or most of August. Until 2010, 90% of companies, shops and industries closed; however, because closing an entire country's economy for an entire month would result in serious financial impacts and workplace backlogs, most companies now close for about two weeks and require all workers to take mandatory vacation, similar to the practice of workplaces closing between 25 December and the first of January.

== History ==
The Feriae Augusti ('Festivals [Holidays] of the Emperor Augustus') were introduced by the Emperor Augustus in 18 BCE. This was an addition to earlier ancient Roman festivals which fell in the same month, such as the Vinalia rustica or the Consualia, which celebrated the harvest and the end of a long period of intense agricultural labor. The Feriae Augusti, in addition to its propaganda function, linked the various August festivals to provide a longer period of rest, called "Augustali", which was felt necessary after the hard labour of the previous weeks.

During these celebrations, horse races were organised across the empire, and beasts of burden (including oxen, donkeys and mules), were released from their work duties and decorated with flowers. Such ancient traditions are still alive today, virtually unchanged in their form and level of participation during the Palio dell'Assunta which takes place on 16 August in Siena. Indeed, the name Palio comes from the pallium, a piece of precious fabric which was the usual prize given to winners of the horse races in ancient Rome.

During the festival, workers greeted their masters, who in return would give them a tip. The custom became so strongly rooted that in the Renaissance it was made compulsory in the Papal States.

The modern Italian name of the holiday comes directly from the Latin name.

According to Richard Overy, author of A History of War in 100 Battles, the Ferragosto Holiday was introduced by C. Caesar Octavian, the future Augustus, after his victory over Mark Antony at the Battle of Actium on 2 September, 31 BCE.

=== In religion ===
During the early medieval period, the Catholic Church moved the date of Ferragosto from the 1st to 15 August—the feast day of the Assumption of Mary—so as to integrate the pre-existing celebration into the cycle of the Christian year.

=== Fascism in Italy ===
The popular tradition of taking a trip during Ferragosto arose under the Fascist regime. In the second half of the 1920s, during the mid-August period, the regime organised hundreds of popular trips through the fascist leisure and recreational organisations of various corporations, and via the setting up of the "People's Trains of Ferragosto", which were available at discounted prices.

The initiative gave the opportunity to less well-off social classes to visit Italian cities or to reach seaside and mountain resorts. The offer was limited to 13, 14 and 15 August, and comprised two options: the "One-Day Trip", within a radius of 50–100 km, and the "Three-Day Trip", within a radius of about 100–200 km.
