= Politics of San Marino =

The politics of the state of San Marino take place in a framework of a unitary parliamentary representative democratic republic, whereby the Captains Regent are the heads of state and heads of government. The country has a multi-party system. Executive power is exercised by the government. Legislative power is vested in both the government and the Grand and General Council. The judiciary is independent of the executive and the legislature.

San Marino was originally led by the Arengo, initially formed with the heads of each family. In the 13th century, power was given to the Great and General Council. In 1243, the first two Captains Regent were nominated by the council, and that system is still in use today.

== The Grand and General Council ==
The legislature of the republic is the Grand and General Council (Consiglio grande e generale). The council is a unicameral legislature which has 60 members with elections occurring every 5 years under a majoritarian representation system in a sole national constituency. Citizens eighteen years or older are eligible to vote. Besides general legislation, the Grand and General Council approves the budget and elects the Captains Regent, the State Congress, the Council of Twelve, the Advising Commissions, and the Government Unions. The council also has the power to ratify treaties with other countries. The council is divided into five different Advising Commissions consisting of 15 councilors which examine, propose, and discuss the implementation of new laws that are on their way to being presented on the floor of the council.

== The Captains Regent ==
Every six months, the Council elects two Captains Regent to be the heads of state. The foundational theory was to create a balance of power or, at least, reciprocal control. They serve a 6-month term. The investiture of the Captains Regent takes place on April 1 and October 1 in every year. Once this term is over, citizens have 3 days in which to file complaints about the Captains' activities. If they warrant it, judicial proceedings against the ex-head(s) of state can be initiated.

The practice of dual heads of state, according to the principle of Collegiality, as well as the frequent re-election of same, are derived directly from the customs of the Roman Republic. The council is equivalent to the Roman Senate; the Captains Regent, to the consuls of ancient Rome.

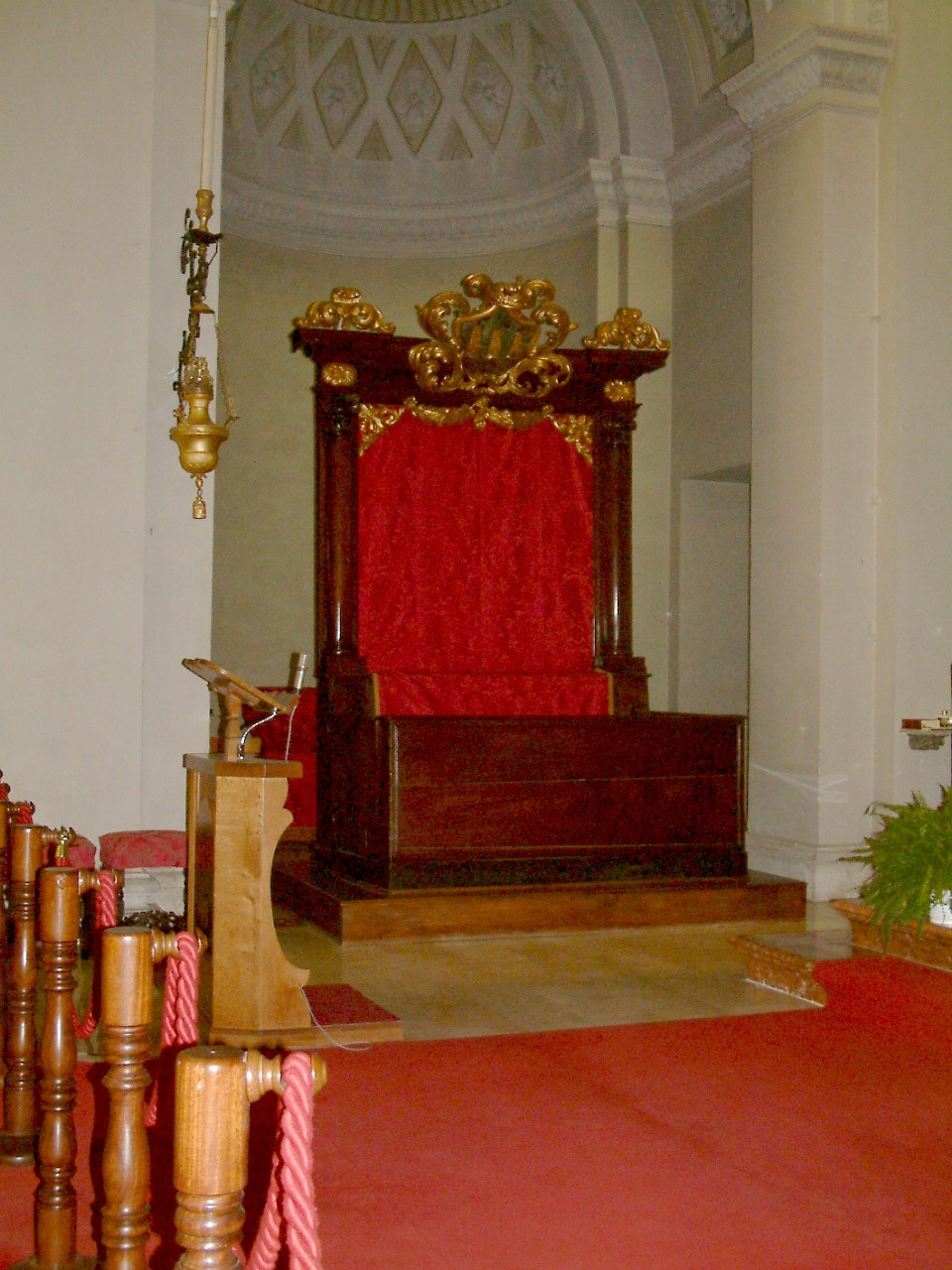
The dual throne of the Captains Regent.

== The Congress of State ==
The Congress of State is the government of the country and wields the executive power. It is composed by a variable number of Secretaries of State, which by law cannot exceed the number of 10, that are appointed by the Grand and General Council at the beginning of the legislature. Because of this fact, also the areas of competence of the various Secretaries are not fixed, as some could be merged depending on the number of Secretaries. The law identifies 10 sectors of the public administration for which the secretaries are politically responsible:

- Secretary of State for Foreign and Political Affairs
- Secretary of State for Internal Affairs and Civil Defense
- Secretary of State for Finance, Budget and Programming, Information and Relations with the State Philatelic and Numismatic Office
- Secretary of State for Education, Culture, University and Justice
- Secretary of State for Territory, Environment and Agriculture
- Secretary of State for Health and Social Security (San Marino)
- Secretary of State for Trade and Relations with the Town Council
- Secretary of State for Communication, Transport, Relations with the Azienda Autonoma di Stato for Services, Tourism and Sport
- Secretary of State for Industry and Crafts
- Secretary of State for Labour and Cooperation

The Captains Regents participate to the Congress with coordination powers, but no voting right. While all the Secretaries are equally important on principle, over the years, the secretary of state for Foreign and Political Affairs has assumed many of the prerogatives of a prime minister or head of government.

== Council of Twelve ==
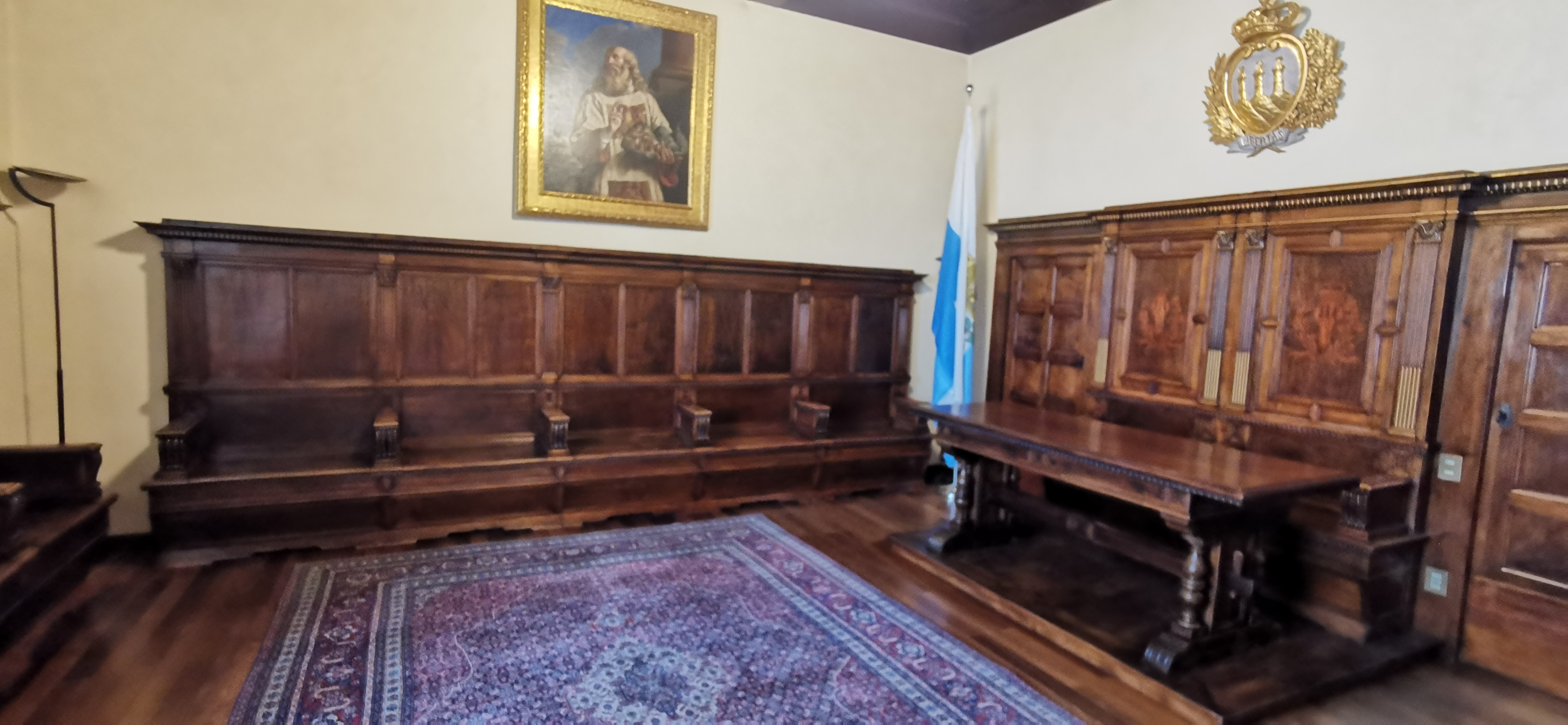
Chamber of the Council of Twelve

The Council of Twelve is appointed by the Grand and General Council. Until 2003, it functioned as a court of appeal; however, it is now mostly responsible for authorising the acquisition of property by foreigners.

== Political parties and elections ==
San Marino is a multi-party democratic republic. The two main parties are the Sammarinese Christian Democratic Party (PDCS) and the Party of Socialists and Democrats (PSD, a merger of the Socialist Party of San Marino and the Party of Democrats) in addition to several other smaller parties. It is difficult for any party to gain a pure majority and most of the time the government is run by a coalition.

Because tourism accounts for more than 50% of the economic sector, the government relies not only on taxes and customs for revenue, but also on the sale of coins and postage stamps to collectors throughout the world. In addition, the Italian Government pays San Marino an annual budget subsidy provided under the terms of the Basic Treaty with Italy.

== Judiciary ==
=== The Guarantors’ Panel on the Constitutionality of Rules ===
The Guarantors’ Panel on the Constitutionality of Rules (Italian: Collegio Garante della Costituzionalità delle Norme) is the highest court of San Marino in matters of constitutional law. The institution was established in February 2002, making it the youngest body of San Marino constitutional order. Its members are also elected by the Grand and General Council.

=== Judicial organization ===
The judicial system of San Marino is entrusted to foreign executives, both for historical and social reasons. The only native judges are the Justices of the Peace, who handle only civil cases where sums involved do not exceed €15,000.

=== Early abolition of capital punishment ===
San Marino carried out the last execution in its history in 1468 (by hanging). The death penalty was abolished for murder on 12 March 1848, and for other crimes two years later.

== Current issues ==
The main issues confronting the current government include economic and administrative problems related to San Marino's status as a close financial and trading partner with Italy while at the same time remaining separated from the European Union (EU). The other priority issue will be to increase the transparency and efficiency in parliament and in relations among parliament, cabinet, and the Captains Regent.

== International organization participation ==
San Marino participates in the following organizations: Council of Europe, ECE, ICAO, ICC, ICFTU, ICRM, IFRCS, ILO, IMF, IOC, IOM (observer), ITU, OPCW, OSCE, UN, UNCTAD, UNESCO, UPU, WHO, WIPO, UNWTO.

== See also ==
- Constitution of San Marino
