= Maria Luisa Berti =

Sammarinese politician

- Berti in 2023

Captain Regent of San Marino
- In office 1 October 2022 – 1 April 2023 Serving with Manuel Ciavatta
- Preceded by: Oscar Mina; Paolo Rondelli
- Succeeded by: Alessandro Scarano; Adele Tonnini
- In office 1 April 2011 – 1 October 2011; Served alongside Filippo Tamagnini
- Preceded by: Giovanni Francesco Ugolini; Andrea Zafferani
- Succeeded by: Gabriele Gatti; Matteo Fiorini

Personal details
- Born: 6 October 1971 (age 54) City of San Marino, San Marino
- Party: Christian Democratic Party
- Other political affiliations: We Sammarinese (2006–present)
- Education: University of Urbino
- Occupation: Politician; Lawyer

Maria Luisa Berti (born 6 October 1971) is a Sammarinese politician who was twice one of two Captains Regent (heads of government for San Marino). The second time she was in office from 1 October 2022 until 1 April 2023 and served alongside Manuel Ciavatta. Eleven years prior, she was in the same post for the April to October 2011 political term. Back then, it was shared with Filippo Tamagnini.
