= Arengo =

Former political assemblies of San Marino

The Arengo was the name of the assembly that ruled San Marino from the fifth century A.D. to 1243, and of the popular councils which regulated the political life in Northern Italy free comuni in the Middle Ages as well. It was made up of the heads of San Marino's Great families and had no leader or fixed meeting place. This made San Marino almost unique in the period as a state that had no Head of State. However this form of rule was cumbersome and the Arengo was crippled by feuds between the Great Families. By the early 13th century the Arengo had become so dysfunctional that the citizens of San Marino decided to elect their own assembly, which they called the Grand and General Council. This assembly became very powerful, and by 1243 the Pope, who was the nominal ruler of San Marino, made the Grand and General Council the supreme body of San Marino.

== Founding ==
After the death of the founders, the community was governed by a small leaderless collection of monks based around the church of St. Agatha on the top of Monte Titano. However, around a hundred years later when Rome looked close to collapse and the Goths were threatening Italy, eight neighbouring towns joined the 'land of San (saint) Marino (the founder)' seeking the saint's protection and blessing against the Goths. This laid the foundation for modern San Marino with its nine municipalities. With such a large expansion of population it became clear that San Marino could not remain without a central structure so the Arengo was formed; based on the original Roman Senate, it was made of the head of each of the Great Families.

== 1906 Arengo ==
Since the 17th century, the Grand and General Council became more oligarchic, with political power resting in the hands of powerful landowners. The Sammarinese Socialist Party agitated for universal male suffrage by convening an arengo in 1906. The heads of the households agreed to let all adult male citizens vote.

Many wealthy landowners opposed the changes and formed the Sammarinese Fascist Party in 1922. They would go on to rule the country until the end of World War II, when a Socialist-Communist coalition government was elected.

== Sources ==
- Oxford Great Lives, various, 2003, Oxford University Press
- Encyclopædia Britannica online edition, various, 2008
- Oxford History of Italy, John Briscome, 1998, Oxford University Press
- The Catholic Encyclopedia, 2007, various, Jesuit Publishing
- The Oxford book of the Christian Church, Michael Thirstone, 1996, Oxford University Press
