= Captains Regent =

Joint heads of state of San Marino

Captains Regent of San Marino
- Capitani Reggenti di San Marino
- Incumbent; Gerardo Giovagnoli; William Casali since 1 October 2026
- Style: The Most Excellent
- Type: Head of state
- Seat: Palazzo Pubblico
- Appointer: Grand and General Council; Two-round system
- Term length: Six months, reeligible after three years respite
- Constituting instrument: Constitution of San Marino; Declaration on the Rights of the Citizens (1600)
- Formation: Thirteenth century
- Salary: €6,000 per month

Captains Regent (Italian: Capitani Reggenti; Romagnol: Capitèn Regìnt) are the two heads of state of the Republic of San Marino. They are elected every six months by the Great and General Council, the country's legislative body. Normally the Captains Regent are chosen from parties in coalition and serve a six-month term. The investiture of the Captains Regent takes place on 1 April and 1 October every year. This tradition dates back at least to 1243.

The practice of dual heads of government (diarchy) is derived directly from the customs of the Roman Republic, equivalent to the consuls of ancient Rome, except the Captains Regent hold no executive power.

== History ==
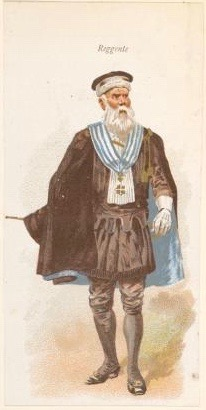
Captain Regent wearing the official garb of the office and the collar of the Order of San Marino

The establishment of the regency took place during the first half of the thirteenth century, when they had the role of managing justice, a task similar to the competence of magistrates. During that period they were called consuls, which derived from ancient Rome. The first two known consuls were elected on 12 December 1243 by the Grand and General Council with a six-month term which is still used today.

At the end of the thirteenth century, the name of the institution started to change, as one took the title of "captain" and the other one of "defender", then in 1317 they became captain and rector. One usually belonged to the upper class, to guarantee the possession of skills necessary to govern the Republic with competence, and one to the working class.

A 1973 law abolished all the restrictions which prevented women from taking public positions. Maria Lea Pedini was elected the first female Captain Regent on 1 April 1981. On 1 April 2017, for the first time two women, Vanessa D'Ambrosio and Mimma Zavoli, occupied the posts of Captains Regent, until their term ended on 1 October 2017.

Since 1 April 1984, after electing its second female Captain Regent, San Marino is the country that has had the most female heads of state in the world. As of April 2026, there have been 22 female Captains Regent since 1981 which have had a governing time of 13 years in total.

== Election ==
Captains Regent are elected every six months by the Grand and General Council, they usually belong to opposite parties to grant an amount of balance and an equal supervision. The electoral procedure is prescribed by a 1945 law, which is mainly based on the Leges Statutae Republicae Sancti Marini of 1600.

The pair is elected if they obtain an absolute majority; there is a second ballot if no pair gets enough votes.

Following their election, the Minister for Internal Affairs announces the new Captains Regent from the balcony of the government building.

=== Eligibility ===
To be eligible for election the candidate should have the following requirements:

- Citizenship from birth (jus sanguinis)
- Be at least 25 years old
- Be an elected deputy of the Grand and General Council
- Not have been elected Captain Regent in the last three years

=== Terms ===
Captains Regent are elected for six month terms that run from 1 April to 1 October and from 1 October to 1 April each year.

=== Investiture ===
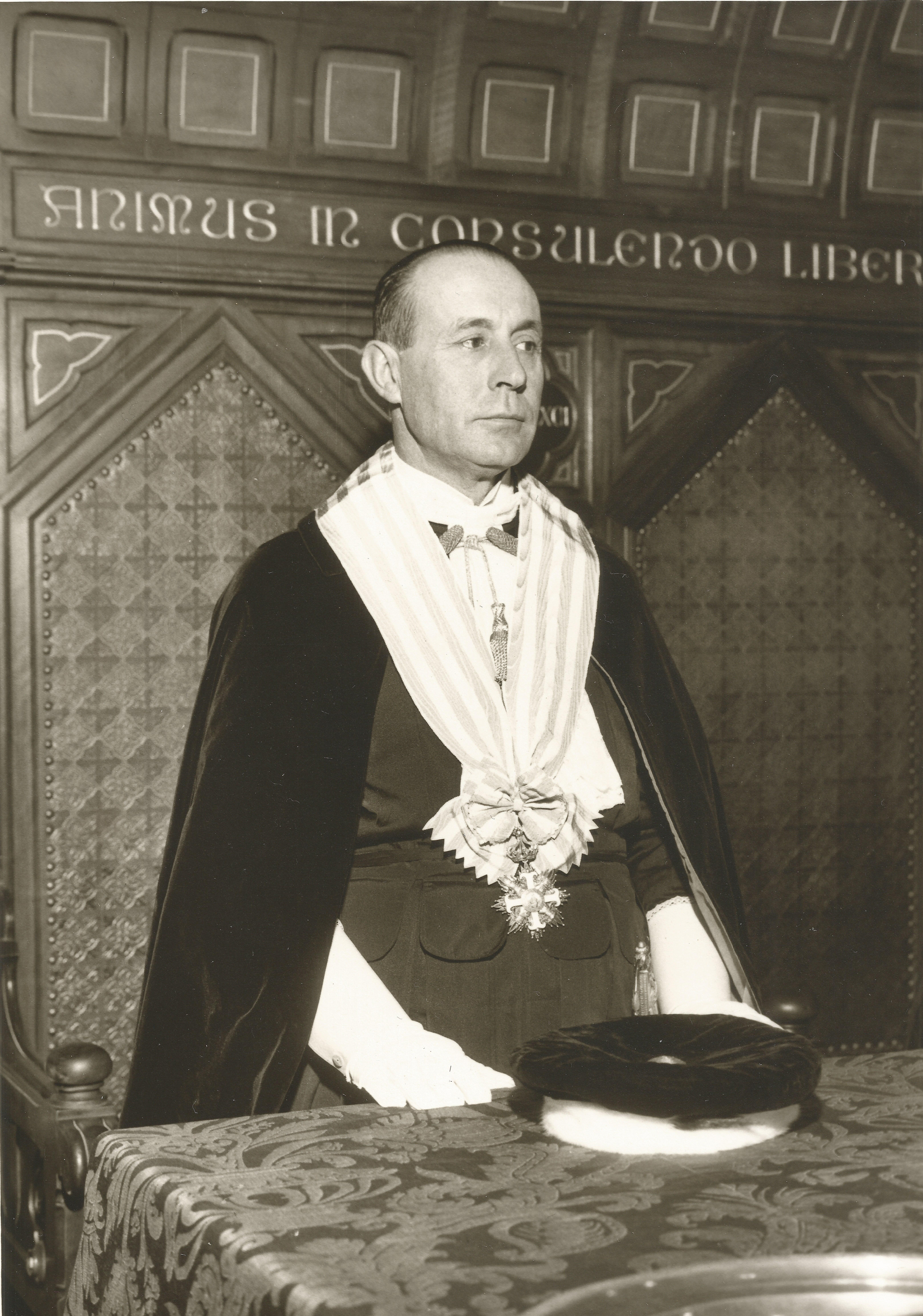
Leonida Suzzi Valli at his investiture in the chamber of the Grand and General Council, 1 April 1963

Investiture ceremonies take place on 1 April and 1 October every year, and are prescribed by Leges Statutae Republicae Sancti Marini. In the morning, in the Piazza della Libertà, the Sammarinese Armed Forces are assembled for the flag-raising ceremony taking place. As the flag is hoisted to the national anthem, the artillery unit fires a gun salute. The newly-elected Captains Regent proceed from the Palazzo Pubblico to the Basilica of San Marino where a High Mass is celebrated by the Bishop of San Marino in celebration of their assumption of office. The entourage returns to the palazzo, where the official address is made and the elected Captains Regent are sworn in according to the oath described in the Statutes of 1600. The outgoing Captains Regent place the collar of the Order of San Marino on the new Captains Regent, finalizing the transfer of power. The swearing in ends as the band plays the national anthem and the outgoing Captains Regent afterward take their leave. The procession then heads to Palazzo Valloni for the assumption of the Captains' throne and the residency.

Finally, the Armed Forces assemble once more for a flag-lowering ceremony.

== Powers and duties ==
The Captains Regent are the chief magistrates of the Sammarinese state, enjoying the honorific style of Excellency. Together, they jointly exercise the functions of head of state according to the principle of collegiality. They represent the Republic and serve as the supreme guarantors of its constitutional order. In this capacity, they oversee the functioning of public powers and State institutions, ensuring that their activities conform to the Declaration on the Citizens' Rights and Fundamental Principles of San Marino Constitutional Order and other applicable laws. They may send formal communications to the Great and General Council, the Congress of State, the Council of XII, and other institutional bodies to safeguard constitutional compliance and the balance of powers. Likewise, they may refer conflicts of competence between constitutional bodies to the Guarantors' Panel on the Constitutionality of Rules.

The Captains Regent convene and preside over the Great and General Council, San Marino's parliament, and its Bureau, representing the Council as a whole but without voting rights. In the event that one Captain Regent is unable to serve, the other may individually convene and preside over the Council and its Bureau. They also coordinate the work of the Congress of State, the country's executive government, and convene and preside over the Judicial Council, the independent body that administers San Marino's court system. Their other institutional responsibilities include presiding over the Grand Mastership of Saint Agatha and the Conference of the Heads of the Township Councils.

Their constitutional and electoral responsibilities include dissolving the Great and General Council in circumstances prescribed by law; calling parliamentary elections; receiving popular petitions (Istanze d'Arengo), referendum petitions and popular legislative initiatives; and ensuring that the procedures governing these initiatives are properly observed. They also determine the dates of referendums and elections for the Heads of the Township Councils and their respective councils. In matters of government formation, they conduct consultations and may issue exploratory mandates and make appointments to facilitate the formation of a new Congress of State. In the event that an electoral majority cannot be established, they also undertake the procedures prescribed by electoral law to facilitate the formation of a parliamentary majority or call a snap election.

In their capacity as heads of state, the Captains Regent promulgate and order the publication of laws passed by the Great and General Council. Before promulgation, they may return legislation to the Council through a reasoned communication if they consider that it violates the formal or substantive principles of the Declaration on the Citizens' Rights. If the Council approves the legislation a second time, however, the Captains Regent are required to promulgate it. They likewise promulgate decrees and regulations adopted by the Congress of State, subject to the applicable constitutional procedures, and may return certain government decrees for reconsideration. They may enact decrees within their own competence where authorized by law. The constitutional order also provides for Regency Decrees in cases of urgency, following consultation with the Congress of State; such decrees must be ratified by the Great and General Council within three months.

The Captains Regent also perform diplomatic and ceremonial functions. They accredit San Marino's diplomatic representatives and receive the credentials of foreign diplomatic representatives, and confer state honours in accordance with the law. Citizens may submit complaints concerning the activities of State bodies, civil servants, and other public entities directly to the Captains Regent, who may order verifications in response.

During their six-month mandates, the Captains Regent enjoy sovereign immunity from prosecution. Following the conclusion of their terms, however, they are subject to the procedure known as the Sindacato della Reggenza (Regency Syndicate). Within fifteen days of the end of their mandate, any citizen registered on the electoral lists may submit complaints concerning actions or omissions committed by either Captain Regent during their tenure. These complaints are adjudicated by the Guarantors' Panel on the Constitutionality of Rules, which may impose sanctions including reprimands, fines and restrictions on political and civil rights.

== See also ==
- Capitano del popolo
- San Marino
- Politics of San Marino
- Grand and General Council
- Congress of State
