= List of diplomatic visits to the Holy See under Pope Francis =

This is the list of visits by representatives of states and international organizations to the Holy See during the pontificate of Pope Francis, which started with his acceptance of the election on March 13, 2013.

The list includes visits by heads of states or government and heads of other sovereign entities under international law (Sovereign Military Order of Malta), as well as heads of international organizations, ministers, and their representatives.

== Statistics ==
Number of entities	156

=== Number of visits per entity ===
Number	Entity
45	(United Nations) UN System (UNSG (3), UNGA (4), ECOSOC, OHCHR (3), UNHCR (4), UNODC; FAO (5), IAEA (2), IFAD (3), ILO, IMF (2), IOM (4), ITU, UNESCO (2), UNICEF, UNRWA (2), UNWTO, WFP (2), WHO (2), WIPO)
14	(European Union) EU (EUCO (4), EC (7), EP (6))
12	North Macedonia
11	Bulgaria
10	Argentina, Bosnia and Herzegovina, Italy, Malta, Poland, (Sovereign Military Order of Malta) Order of Malta
9	Colombia, Switzerland, (United States) USA
8	Albania, Germany, Slovakia, Spain, (Council of Europe) CoE (SG (3), PA (3), CHR, ECHR)
7	Iraq, Lithuania, Paraguay, Slovenia, Ukraine
6	Croatia, Ecuador, Hungary, Jordan, Latvia, Lebanon, San Marino
5	Bolivia, France, Luxembourg, Montenegro, Palestine, (Organization of American States) OAS
4	Austria, Brazil, (Cape Verde) Cabo Verde, Central African Republic, Cyprus, (Republic of Ireland) Ireland, Israel, Kazakhstan, Peru, Romania, Uganda, Vietnam
3	Armenia, Azerbaijan, Bahrain, Chile, Dominican Republic, Ghana, Iran, Japan, Mozambique, Netherlands, Russia, South Korea, Uruguay
2	Angola, Belgium, Benin, Cameroon, Canada, Costa Rica, Czech Republic, (Democratic Republic of the Congo) DRC, Equatorial Guinea, Estonia, Fiji, (Georgia (country)) Georgia, Grenada, Haiti, Honduras, Lesotho, Liberia, Madagascar, Monaco, Panama, Portugal, Serbia, Seychelles, Sri Lanka, Timor-Leste, Togo, (Turkey) Türkiye, Zambia, OIF
1	Andorra, Antigua and Barbuda, Australia, The Bahamas, Bangladesh, Belarus, Belize, Burkina Faso, Burundi, (Republic of the Congo) Congo, Cuba, Denmark, Dominica, Egypt, El Salvador, Eswatini, Ethiopia, Gabon, Greece, Guinea, (Guinea-Bissau) Guinea Bissau, India, Ivory Coast, Kenya, Kiribati, Kuwait, Kyrgyzstan, Liechtenstein, Malawi, Mali, Mexico, Moldova, Myanmar, New Zealand, Niger, Nigeria, Philippines, Qatar, Rwanda, São Tomé and Príncipe, Samoa, Senegal, Sierra Leone, Singapore, South Sudan, Tajikistan, Tanzania, Thailand, Trinidad and Tobago, Tunisia, Venezuela, (United Kingdom) UK, CERN, ICC (2),IDLO, NATO, (Organisation of Islamic Cooperation) OIC,OPCW, WB

=== Visits per regions ===
Visits per regions according to the United Nations geoscheme.

Region	Number	Entity
Europe	233	Albania (8), Andorra, Austria (4), Belarus, Belgium (2), Bosnia and Herzegovina (10), Bulgaria (11), Croatia (6), Cyprus (4), Czech Republic (2), Denmark, Estonia (2), France (5), Germany (8), Greece, Hungary (6), (Republic of Ireland) Ireland (4), Italy (10), Latvia (6), Liechtenstein, Lithuania (7), Luxembourg (5), Malta (10), Moldova, Monaco (2), Montenegro (5), Netherlands (3), North Macedonia (12), Poland (10), Portugal (2), Romania (4), Russia (3), San Marino (6), Serbia (2), Slovenia (7), Slovakia (8), Spain (8), Switzerland (9), (Turkey) Türkiye (2), Ukraine (7), (United Kingdom) UK, (Sovereign Military Order of Malta) Order of Malta (10), CERN, (European Union) EU (EUCO (4), EC (7), EP (6)) (14)
Americas	89	Antigua and Barbuda, Argentina (10), The Bahamas (2), Belize, Bolivia (5), Brazil (4), Canada (2), Chile (3), Colombia (9), Costa Rica (2), Cuba, Dominica, Dominican Republic (3), Ecuador (6), El Salvador, Grenada (2), Haiti (2), Honduras (2), Mexico, Panama (2), Paraguay (7), Peru (4), Trinidad and Tobago, Uruguay (3), Venezuela, (United States) USA (9), (Organization of American States) OAS (5)
Asia	70	Armenia (3), Azerbaijan (3), Bahrain (3), Bangladesh, (Georgia (country)) Georgia (2), India, Iran (3), Iraq (7), Israel (4), Japan (3), Jordan (6), Kazakhstan (4), Kuwait, Kyrgyzstan, Lebanon (6), Myanmar, Palestine (5), Philippines, Qatar, Singapore, South Korea (3), Sri Lanka (2), Tajikistan, Thailand, Timor-Leste (2), Vietnam (4)
Africa	61	Angola (2), Benin (2), Burkina Faso, Burundi, (Cape Verde) Cabo Verde (4), Cameroon (2), Central African Republic (4), (Republic of the Congo) Congo, (Democratic Republic of the Congo) DRC (2), Egypt (2), Equatorial Guinea (2), Eswatini, Ethiopia, Gabon, Ghana (3), Guinea, (Guinea-Bissau) Guinea Bissau, Ivory Coast, Kenya, Lesotho (2), Liberia (2), Madagascar (2), Malawi, Mali, Mozambique (3), Niger, Nigeria, Rwanda, São Tomé and Príncipe, Senegal, Seychelles (2), Sierra Leone, South Sudan, Tanzania, Togo (2), Tunisia, Uganda (4), Zambia (2)
Oceania	6	Australia, Fiji (2), Kiribati, New Zealand, Samoa
Global	50	(United Nations) UN System (UNSG (3), UNGA (4), ECOSOC, OHCHR (3), UNHCR (4), UNODC; FAO (5), IAEA (2), IFAD (3), ILO, IMF (2), IOM (4), ITU, UNESCO (2), UNICEF, UNRWA (2), UNWTO, WFP (2), WHO (2), WIPO) (45), ICC (2),IDLO,OPCW, WB
Interregional	12	(Council of Europe) CoE (SG (3), PA (3), CHR, ECHR) (8), NATO, (Organisation of Islamic Cooperation) OIC, OIF (2)

== List of visits ==
=== 2013 ===
#	Date	Visitor	Notes	Source
March 2013
1	March 18, 2013	President Cristina Fernández de Kirchner (Argentina)		
2	March 20, 2013	President Dilma Rousseff (Brazil)		
April 2013
3	April 9, 2013	(United Nations) Secretary-General Ban Ki-moon (UN)	On April 9, 2013, Pope Francis met UN Secretary-General Ban Ki-moon to discuss peace, human rights, Syria, human trafficking, and development, affirming the Church’s support for UN goals.	
4	April 11, 2013	Prime Minister Alberto Vaquina (Mozambique)	Pope Francis received the Prime Minister of Mozambique, Alberto Vaquina. They discussed the good bilateral relations and the Church’s contribution to peace and development.	
5	April 13, 2013	(United Nations) ECOSOC President Néstor Osorio (UN) (2)		
6	April 15, 2013	Prime Minister Mariano Rajoy (Spain)	Pope Francis met Spanish PM Mariano Rajoy to discuss Spain’s crisis, youth unemployment, Church aid, dialogue in society, family, religious education, and Latin America.	
7	April 19, 2013	President Rafael Correa (Ecuador)	Pope Francis met Ecuador’s President Correa to discuss Church–State dialogue, social justice, solidarity, indigenous rights, and environmental protection.	
8	April 26, 2013	President Andry Rajoelina (Madagascar)	Pope Francis met Madagascar’s President Rajoelina to discuss Church–State ties, efforts toward democracy, economic development, and the Church’s role in health, education, and national dialogue.	
9	April 30, 2013	President Shimon Peres (Israel)	Pope Francis met Israeli President Peres to discuss Middle East peace, Syria, Jerusalem, and Holy See–Israel relations, stressing dialogue, reconciliation, and progress on a bilateral agreement.	
May 2013
10	May 3, 2013	President Michel Sleiman (Lebanon)	Pope Francis met Lebanese President Sleiman to discuss national unity, Syrian refugee aid, peace talks, and the role of Christians in the Middle East amid ongoing regional challenges and instability.	
11	May 6, 2013	President Ueli Maurer (Switzerland)	Pope Francis met Swiss President Ueli Maurer to discuss strengthening ties between the Holy See and Switzerland, human rights, youth education, and international collaboration for justice and peace.	
12	May 13, 2013	President Juan Manuel Santos (Colombia)	Pope Francis met Colombian President Santos to discuss Mother Laura Montoya's canonization, Church contributions to peace, social justice, and family, and the ongoing peace process in Colombia.	
13	May 18, 2013	Chancellor Angela Merkel (Germany)	Pope Francis met German Chancellor Angela Merkel to discuss human rights, religious freedom, Christian persecution, Europe’s role as a community of values, and global peace efforts.	
14	May 22, 2013	President Thomas Boni Yayi (Benin)		
15	May 23, 2013	President Mauricio Funes (El Salvador)	Pope Francis met El Salvador’s President Carlos Funes to discuss the legacy of Archbishop Oscar Romero, Church contributions to peace, education, and ethical issues like family and life.	
16	May 24, 2013	Prime Minister Marin Raykov (Bulgaria)		
17	May 24, 2013	(North Macedonia) Speaker Trajko Valjanoski (FYR Macedonia)		
18	May 31, 2013	(United Nations) UNGA President Vuk Jeremić (UN) (3)	Pope Francis met UNGA President Vuk Jeremić to discuss peaceful conflict resolution, humanitarian crises, human trafficking, sustainable development, and the UN's role in promoting global justice and dignity.	
June 2013
19	June 1, 2013	President José Mujica (Uruguay)	Pope Francis met Uruguay’s President José Mujica to discuss the country’s socio-political situation, human rights, justice, social peace, and the Catholic Church’s contributions to public debate and service.	
20	June 3, 2013	(Cape Verde) President Jorge Carlos Fonseca (Cabo Verde)	Pope Francis met Cape Verde’s President Jorge Fonseca to discuss Church relations, cultural identity, the Church’s role in education and health, and regional challenges.	
21	June 13, 2013	Prime Minister Alenka Bratušek (Slovenia)	Pope Francis met Slovenia’s Prime Minister Alenka Bratušek to discuss bilateral relations, religious freedom, economic challenges, and the Church’s role in social support and education.	
22	June 15, 2013	(European Union) Commission President José Manuel Barroso (EU)	Pope Francis met European Commission President José Manuel Durão Barroso to discuss European integration, economic challenges, the Church’s role in Europe’s wellbeing, and human rights.	
23	June 17, 2013	President Nicolás Maduro (Venezuela)	Pope Francis met Venezuelan President Nicolás Maduro to discuss the nation's social and political situation, including poverty and crime. They emphasized the Church’s role in charity, education, and healthcare.	
24	June 17, 2013	Deputy Prime Minister Roj Shaweis (Iraq)		
25	June 22, 2013	(Sovereign Military Order of Malta) Prince and Grand Master Matthew Festing (Order of Malta)		
26	June 24, 2013	Prime Minister Joseph Muscat (Malta)	Pope Francis met Maltese PM Joseph Muscat, discussing Malta’s Christian heritage, Church-state agreements, values, education, marriage laws, EU role, and shared efforts on migration challenges.	
July 2013
27	July 4, 2013	Prime Minister Enrico Letta (Italy)	Pope Francis met Italian PM Enrico Letta, discussing youth jobs, families’ role, Church support, EU challenges, Mediterranean/Middle East issues, and reaffirming cooperation for Italy and global good.	
28	July 6, 2013	President Anthony Thomas Aquinas Carmona (Trinidad and Tobago)	Pope Francis met Trinidad and Tobago’s President Carmona, discussing the Church’s role in education, health, aid, youth support against crime, and shared commitment to family and personal development.	
September 2013
29	September 4, 2013	Captains Regent Antonella Mularoni and Denise Amici (San Marino)	Pope Francis received San Marino’s Captains Regent, discussing strong bilateral ties, the grave Middle East crisis, and reaffirming shared commitment to peace and international cooperation.	
30	September 6, 2013	President Evo Morales (Bolivia)	Pope Francis met Bolivian President Evo Morales, discussing Bolivia’s social, economic, and religious issues, Church support in education and health, Church-state cooperation, and peace in Syria and the Middle East.	
31	September 12, 2013	Prime Minister Yingluck Shinawatra (Thailand)	Pope Francis met Thai PM Yingluck Shinawatra, highlighting strong Holy See–Thailand ties, Church-State cooperation in education and welfare, and stressing dialogue for peace, rights, and justice in Asia.	
32	September 12, 2013	(Organization of American States) Secretary-General José Miguel Insulza (OAS)		
33	September 19, 2013	Prime Minister Algirdas Butkevičius (Lithuania)	Pope Francis met Lithuanian PM Algirdas Butkevičius, noting strong ties, the Church’s role in education, families, and values, and discussing EU, peace in the Middle East, and dialogue on Syria.	
34	September 20, 2013	President János Áder (Hungary)	Pope Francis met Hungarian President János Áder, praising strong Church-State ties, discussing the economic crisis, life and family, creation, peace, religious freedom, and dialogue for Syria and the Middle East.	
35	September 20, 2013	President Porfirio Lobo Sosa (Honduras)	Pope Francis met Honduran President Porfirio Lobo Sosa, noting strong ties, the gift of Our Lady of Suyapa, the Church’s role in education, health, charity, life, family, and efforts for reconciliation.	
36	September 27, 2013	Director-General Ahmet Üzümcü (OPCW)		
October 2013
37	October 7, 2013	King Letsie III (Lesotho)	Pope Francis met King Letsie III and Queen of Lesotho, highlighting strong ties, religious freedom, Church-State cooperation in health, education, charity, family, and addressing regional political and economic issues.	
38	October 10, 2013	President Ivo Josipović (Croatia)	Pope Francis met Croatian President Ivo Josipović, praising strong Church-State ties, Croatia’s EU entry, addressing economic and regional challenges, and expressing concern for Christian communities worldwide.	
39	October 11, 2013	(European Union) Parliament President Martin Schulz (EU) (2)		
40	October 11, 2013	(Council of Europe) Assembly President Jean-Claude Mignon (CoE)		
41	October 14, 2013	(United Nations) Director-General William L. Swing (UN/IOM) (4)		
42	October 17, 2013	President Mahmoud Abbas (Palestine)	Pope Francis met Palestinian President Mahmoud Abbas, discussing Middle East peace, Israeli-Palestinian negotiations, Syria, Christian communities’ role, and progress on a Global Agreement with the Catholic Church in Palestine.	
43	October 18, 2013	President Paul Biya (Cameroon)	Pope Francis met Cameroonian President Paul Biya, praising strong bilateral ties, the Church’s role in education, healthcare, and peace, and discussing regional security and reconciliation efforts in sub-Saharan Africa.	
44	October 24, 2013	Prince Guillaume of Luxembourg (Luxembourg)		
45	October 25, 2013	President Teodoro Obiang Nguema Mbasogo (Equatorial Guinea)	Pope Francis met Equatorial Guinea’s President Teodoro Obiang, highlighting the Church’s role in education and social development, and formalized a bilateral agreement recognizing the Church’s legal status and cooperation with the State.	
46	October 26, 2013	President Ricardo Martinelli (Panama)	Pope Francis met Panamanian President Ricardo Martinelli, discussing national social policies, development projects, Church-State relations, Panama’s Christian heritage, and regional issues, noting the gift of Santa María La Antigua.	
47	October 28, 2013	President Jim Yong Kim (World Bank Group)		
November 2013
48	November 8, 2013	President Laura Chinchilla (Costa Rica)	Pope Francis met Costa Rican President Chinchilla, discussing Church-State cooperation on social issues, life, environment, a possible bilateral agreement, and the need for peace regionally and globally.	
49	November 18, 2013	Prime Minister Perry Christie (The Bahamas)	Pope Francis met Bahamian PM Christie, discussing migration, the Church’s role in welfare and education, and hopes for stronger collaboration between the Holy See and the Bahamas.	
50	November 18, 2013	(United Nations) Director-General Guy Ryder (UN/ILO) (5)		
51	November 22, 2013	Prime Minister Vjekoslav Bevanda (Bosnia and Herzegovina)	Pope Francis met Bosnian PM Bevanda, discussing the nation’s goals, open society, and economic challenges, noting strong Church-State ties under the 2006 Agreement and Catholics’ contribution to society.	
52	November 25, 2013	President Horacio Cartes (Paraguay)	Pope Francis met Paraguayan President Cartes, noting strong bilateral ties, discussing poverty, corruption, human rights, development, and highlighting the Church’s role and Paraguay’s cooperation with the Holy See.	
53	November 25, 2013	President Vladimir Putin (Russia)	Pope Francis met Russian President Putin, discussing bilateral ties, the Catholic community in Russia, Christian values, global challenges for Christians, and stressing peace and dialogue in Syria and the Middle East.	
December 2013
54	December 2, 2013	Prime Minister Benjamin Netanyahu (Israel) (2)	Pope Francis met Israeli PM Netanyahu, discussing Israeli-Palestinian peace talks, Holy Land pilgrimage plans, Church-State relations, and hopes for the swift conclusion of the Israel–Holy See Agreement.	
55	December 6, 2013	(United Nations) High Commissioner António Guterres (UN/UNHCR) (6)		
56	December 9, 2013	(Republic of the Congo) President Denis Sassou N’Guesso (Congo)	Pope Francis met Congolese President Sassou N’Guesso, praising the Church’s role in education and aid, noting strong bilateral ties, and discussing humanitarian issues, refugees, security, and rising extremism in Central Africa.	
57	December 13, 2013	(Organisation of Islamic Cooperation) Secretary General Ekmeleddin Ihsanoğlu (OIC)		
58	December 19, 2013	Prime Minister Ralph Gonsalves (Saint Vincent and the Grenadines)	Pope Francis met PM Ralph Gonsalves of Saint Vincent and the Grenadines, discussing life, family, education, interreligious dialogue, regional issues, and cooperation through regional organizations.	

=== 2014 ===
#	Date	Visitor	Notes	Source
January 2014
59	January 24, 2014	President François Hollande (France)	Pope Francis met French President Hollande to discuss Church–State dialogue, family, bioethics, religious freedom, poverty, migration, environment, and peace in the Middle East and Africa.	
February 2014
60	February 15,	President Nicos Anastasiades (Cyprus)	Pope Francis met Cyprus President Anastasiades, discussing religious freedom, Cyprus talks, and regional instability, stressing Christian communities’ role in peace and wellbeing.	
61	February 21, 2014	President Dilma Rousseff (Brazil) (2)		
62	February 24, 2014	President Michel Martelly (Haiti)	Pope Francis received Haiti’s President Martelly, praising Church support in education, health, and charity, and stressing reconstruction, dialogue, and reconciliation for the nation’s common good.	
March 2014
63	March 1, 2014	Prime Minister Victor Ponta (Romania)	Pope Francis met Romanian PM Ponta, discussing family, education, religious freedom, Catholic Church’s societal role, and international conflicts, emphasizing dialogue and cooperation with Romania.	
64	March 17, 2014	President Cristina Fernández de Kirchner (Argentina) (2)	Pope Francis received Argentina’s President Fernández de Kirchner and her delegation at Casa Santa Marta, exchanging greetings and affection on the first anniversary of his Pontificate, followed by a private lunch.	
65	March 20, 2014	President Filip Vujanović (Montenegro)	Pope Francis met Montenegro’s President Vujanović, praising strong Church–State relations, discussing regional issues, and Montenegro’s progress toward European and Euro-Atlantic integration.	
66	March 21, 2014	President George Abela (Malta) (2)	Pope Francis met Malta’s President Abela, discussing Malta’s Christian heritage, Church contributions in education and welfare, EU role, regional issues, and migration affecting Europe.	
67	March 22, 2014	President Goodluck Jonathan (Nigeria)	Pope Francis met Nigeria’s President Jonathan, praising Church contributions in education, healthcare, and social dialogue, stressing human dignity, religious freedom, peace, and regional crises in Africa.	
68	March 27, 2014	(United States) President Barack Obama (USA)	Pope Francis met U.S. President Obama, discussing international conflicts, religious freedom, life issues, immigration reform, and joint efforts to combat human trafficking worldwide.	
69	March 28, 2014	President Karolos Papoulias (Greece)	Pope Francis met Greece’s President Papoulias, discussing Church–State relations, religious communities, ecumenism, the impact of the economic crisis, EU role, and the future of Christians in conflict-affected regions.	
April 2014
70	April 3, 2014	(Cape Verde) Prime Minister José Maria Neves (Cabo Verde) (2)	Pope Francis met Cape Verde’s PM Neves, followed by the exchange of ratification instruments for the 2013 agreement on the Catholic Church’s legal status, covering worship, education, marriage, charity, and Church-state collaboration.	
71	April 3, 2014	Queen Elisabeth II and Prince Philip (United Kingdom)	Queen Elizabeth II, with the Duke of Edinburgh, visited Pope Francis at the Vatican, holding a private meeting, exchanging gifts, and honoring St. Edward the Confessor.	
72	April 5, 2014	President Ellen Johnson Sirleaf (Liberia)	Pope Francis met Liberia’s President Sirleaf, praising Church contributions to peace, reconciliation, education, and social welfare, and discussed Liberia’s democratic progress and regional crises.	
73	April 7, 2014	King Abdullah II of Jordan (Jordan)	Pope Francis received King Abdullah II of Jordan at the Vatican for a cordial meeting, discussing the upcoming papal visit to Jordan, interreligious dialogue, and peace efforts.	
74	April 24, 2014	Prime Minister Edi Rama (Albania)	Pope Francis met Albania’s PM Rama, discussing strong Church–State relations, interreligious dialogue, the Church’s societal contributions, regional issues, and Albania’s EU integration progress.	
75	April 26, 2014	Prime Minister Arseniy Yatsenyuk (Ukraine)	Pope Francis met Ukraine’s PM Yatsenyuk, discussing the country’s political and social stability, the role of Churches in fostering harmony, and potential international initiatives to support constructive dialogue.	
76	April 26, 2014	President Bronisław Komorowski (Poland)		
77	April 28, 2014	King Juan Carlos I (Spain) (2)	Pope Francis met King Juan Carlos and Queen Sofia of Spain, discussing strong Church–State relations, the Church’s societal role, Spain’s current issues, and international crises.	
78	April 29, 2014	President Horacio Cartes (Paraguay) (2)		
May 2014
79	May 2, 2014	President José Eduardo dos Santos (Angola)	Pope Francis met Angola’s President dos Santos, discussing Church–State relations, a planned agreement on the Church’s legal status, the Church’s role in education and healthcare, and regional challenges including poverty, reconciliation, and peace.	
80	May 15, 2014	Governor-General Jeremiah Mateparae (New Zealand)	Pope Francis met New Zealand’s Governor-General Mateparae, discussing the Church’s societal contributions, national social and economic issues, and regional cooperation in development and international peace missions.	
81	May 19, 2014	King Hamad bin Isa Al Khalifa (Bahrain)	Pope Francis met King Hamad of Bahrain, discussing peace and stability in the Middle East, interreligious dialogue, and the positive role of the local Christian community.	
82	May 19, 2014	Prime Minister Donald Tusk (Poland) (2)	Pope Francis met Poland’s PM Tusk, discussing John Paul II’s canonization, the 2016 World Youth Day visit, Poland’s social and economic situation, and tensions in Eastern Europe.	
83	May 21, 2014	(North Macedonia) President Gjorge Ivanov (FYR Macedonia) (2)		
84	May 28, 2014	Prime Minister Plamen Oresharski (Bulgaria) (2)		
85	May 30, 2014	Director-General Rolf-Dieter Heuer (CERN)		
June 2014
86	June 6, 2014	Prime Minister Shinzō Abe (Japan)	Pope Francis met Japan’s PM Abe, discussing strong Japan–Holy See relations, Church contributions in education, welfare, and healthcare, and regional and global issues including peace, development, environment, and nuclear disarmament.	
87	June 7, 2014	President Enrique Peña Nieto (Mexico)	Pope Francis met Mexico’s President Peña Nieto, discussing religious freedom reforms, migration, poverty, unemployment, combating violence and drug trafficking, and regional and international issues.	
88	June 9, 2014	(United Nations) Director-General Francis Gurry (UN/WIPO) (7)		
89	June 13, 2014	President Danilo Medina (Dominican Republic)	Pope Francis met the Dominican Republic’s President Medina, discussing strong Church–State relations, the Church’s contributions in education, healthcare, and charity, and national and regional issues, including immigrant naturalization.	
90	June 20, 2014	(Sovereign Military Order of Malta) Prince and Grand Master Matthew Festing (Order of Malta) (2)		
91	June 28, 2014	President Hery Rajaonarimampianina (Madagascar) (2)	Pope Francis met Madagascar’s President Rajaonarimampianina, discussing strong Church–State relations, national recovery, reconciliation, education, healthcare, poverty, social inequality, and global conflicts.	
92	June 30, 2014	King Felipe VI (Spain) (3)	Pope Francis met Spain’s King Felipe VI and Queen Letizia, discussing Church–State collaboration, societal wellbeing, and international and regional issues, including areas of conflict.	
September 2014
93	September 1, 2014	Grand Duchess Maria Teresa (Luxembourg) (2)		
94	September 4, 2014	Prince El Hassan bin Talal (Jordan) (2)		
95	September 5, 2014	President Juan Carlos Varela (Panama) (2)	Pope Francis met Panama’s President Varela, discussing Church–State collaboration on social issues affecting youth and the vulnerable, regional matters ahead of the Summit of the Americas, and international peace-building efforts.	
96	September 5, 2014	Prime Minister Antoni Martí (Andorra)	Pope Francis met Andorra’s Head of Government Martí, discussing strong Church–State relations, reinforced by the 2008 agreement, and focusing on social issues of common interest.	
97	September 11, 2014	President Mohamed Marzouki (Tunisia)	Pope Francis met Tunisia’s President Marzouki, discussing peace, interreligious dialogue, human rights, religious freedom, rejecting extremism, and the Church’s social, health, and education contributions, with focus on the Mediterranean region.	
98	September 19, 2014	President Serzh Sargsyan (Armenia)	Pope Francis met Armenia’s President Sargsyan, discussing strong bilateral ties, Christianity’s role in Armenian society, regional conflicts, Middle East peace, and the protection of Christians, religious minorities, and refugees.	
99	September 20, 2014	President Andris Bērziņš (Latvia)	Pope Francis met Latvia’s President Bērziņš, discussing strong Church–State relations, the Church’s contributions in education and social welfare, Latvia’s EU Council Presidency, and a peaceful resolution in Ukraine.	
100	September 20, 2014	(Council of Europe) Secretary-General Thorbjørn Jagland (CoE) (2)		
101	September 20, 2014	President Cristina Fernández de Kirchner (Argentina) (3)		
102	September 26, 2014	Secretary-General Abdou Diouf (OIF)		
103	September 29, 2014	President Marie-Louise Coleiro Preca (Malta) (3)	Pope Francis met Malta’s President Coleiro Preca, discussing strong Church–State relations, the Church’s role in education, welfare, and family values, EU engagement, Mediterranean conflicts, and migration challenges.	
October 2014
104	October 3, 2014	President Mahinda Rajapaksa (Sri Lanka)	Pope Francis met Sri Lanka’s President Rajapaksa, discussing social and economic progress, citizens’ legitimate expectations, and the upcoming papal visit to promote reconciliation, justice, and peace.	
105	October 17, 2014	President Park Geun-hye (South Korea)		
106	October 18, 2014	Prime Minister Nguyên Tán Dũng (Vietnam)	Pope Francis met Vietnam’s PM Nguyên Tân Dũng, discussing strengthened bilateral relations, the Church’s societal contributions, support for the Catholic community, ongoing dialogue, and regional peace and stability initiatives in Asia.	
107	October 23, 2014	Prime Minister Keith Mitchell (Grenada)	Pope Francis met Grenada’s PM Mitchell, discussing strong Church–State relations and the Church’s contributions in education, social services, and charity, emphasizing youth development and national cooperation for the common good.	
108	October 27, 2014	President Yoweri Museveni (Uganda)	Pope Francis met Uganda’s President Museveni, discussing strong Church–State relations, the Church’s role in education, social services, and healthcare, promoting peaceful coexistence, and addressing international issues and African conflicts.	
109	October 28, 2014	(European Union) Parliament President Martin Schulz (EU) (3)		
November 2014
110	November 10, 2014	President John Mahama (Ghana)	Pope Francis met Ghana’s President Mahama, discussing strong Church–State relations, the Church’s contributions in education, healthcare, and social dialogue, family promotion, and the Ebola humanitarian crisis in West Africa.	
111	November 13, 2014	President Heinz Fischer (Austria)	Pope Francis met Austria’s President Fischer, discussing strong bilateral relations, religious freedom, human rights, interreligious and intercultural dialogue, and international issues, particularly the Middle East situation.	
112	November 14, 2014	President Ollanta Humala (Peru)	Pope Francis met Peru’s President Humala, discussing strong Church–State relations, Christianity’s role in national identity, the Church’s contributions to human, social, and cultural progress, regional political and social issues, and environmental protection.	
113	November 18, 2014	President Armando Guebuza (Senegal)	Pope Francis met Senegal’s President Sall, discussing strong Church–State relations, the Church’s role in education, healthcare, and peace-building, and regional crises and international issues.	
114	November 24, 2014	President Armando Guebuza (Egypt)	Pope Francis met Egypt’s President Al-Sisi, discussing political transition, human rights, religious freedom, interreligious dialogue, peaceful coexistence, and Egypt’s role in promoting Middle East and North Africa peace and stability.	
December 2014
115	December 4, 2014	President Armando Guebuza (Mozambique) (2)	Pope Francis met Mozambique’s President Guebuza, discussing strong Church–State relations, the Church’s contributions in education, healthcare, and peacebuilding, and regional challenges including disarmament, poverty, and social inequality.	
116	December 10, 2014	(International Monetary Fund) Managing Director Christine Lagarde (UN/IMF) (8)		
117	December 13, 2014	Prime Minister Matteo Renzi (Italy)	Pope Francis met Italy’s PM Renzi, discussing economic and social challenges, youth employment, education, Middle East conflicts, EU priorities, and ongoing bilateral cooperation.	
118	December 15, 2014	Presidency Member Dragan Čović (Bosnia and Herzegovina) (2)	Pope Francis met Bosnia and Herzegovina’s Dragan Čović, discussing the country’s situation, Catholics’ societal contributions and flood reconstruction efforts, strong Church–State relations under the 2006 Agreement, and regional and international issues.	

=== 2015 ===
#	Date	Visitor	Notes	Source
February 2015
119	February 5, 2015	President Anote Tong (Kiribati)	Pope Francis met Kiribati’s President Anote Tong, with talks highlighting environmental protection and the grave impact of climate change on Pacific nations, expressing hope for effective global action at the upcoming COP-21 in Paris.	
120	February 12, 2015	Vice-President Shahindokht Molaverdi (Iran)		
121	February 21, 2015	Chancellor Angela Merkel (Germany) (2)	Pope Francis met German Chancellor Angela Merkel, discussing poverty, hunger, human rights, religious freedom, climate, and stressing dialogue for peace in Ukraine ahead of the G7 Summit.	
March 2015
122	March 2, 2015	(United Nations) Director-General Irina Bokova (UN/UNESCO) (9)		
123	March 6, 2015	President Ilham Aliyev (Azerbaijan)	Pope Francis met Azerbaijan’s President Ilham Aliyev, discussing bilateral ties, the Catholic community, culture, and the value of interreligious dialogue, stressing education and negotiation for peace.	
124	March 16, 2015	Captains Regent Gian Franco Terenzi and Guerrino Zanotti (San Marino) (2)	Pope Francis met San Marino’s Captains Regent, highlighting strong bilateral ties, Church–State collaboration in social fields, and shared commitment within the international community.	
April 2015
125	April 9, 2015	President Andrej Kiska (Slovakia)	Pope Francis met Slovak President Andrej Kiska, recalling 25 years of diplomatic ties, affirming strong Church–State dialogue, and discussing global challenges, especially the Middle East and human dignity.	
126	April 10, 2015	(Georgia (country)) President Giorgi Margvelashvili (Georgia)	Pope Francis met Georgian President Giorgi Margvelashvili, discussing bilateral ties, the Catholic Church’s social role, regional tensions, the need for peaceful negotiation, and Georgia’s role in Europe.	
127	April 18, 2015	President Sergio Mattarella (Italy) (3)	Pope Francis met Italy’s President Mattarella, discussing strong bilateral ties, social issues like family, education, work, and migration, the Church’s aid efforts, and regional violence in the eastern Mediterranean and North Africa.	
128	April 24, 2015	President Miloš Zeman (Czech Republic)	Pope Francis met Czech President Miloš Zeman, marking 25 years of diplomatic ties, discussing Church–State cooperation in culture, education, and social welfare, and the situation of Christians and minorities in the Middle East.	
129	April 28, 2015	President Rafael Correa (Ecuador) (2)		
130	April 30, 2015	President James Alix Michel (Seychelles)	Pope Francis met Seychelles’ President Michel, discussing strong Church–State relations, the Church’s contributions in education and welfare, human dignity, environmental protection, and regional socio-political issues.	
May 2015
131	May 15, 2015	President Klaus Iohannis (Romania) (2)	On May 15, Pope Francis met Romanian President Klaus Iohannis. Talks marked 25 years of diplomatic ties, discussed cooperation, Catholic communities, minority coexistence, and global issues.	
132	May 16, 2015	President Mahmoud Abbas (Palestine) (2)	On 16 May 2015, Pope Francis met President Abbas of Palestine. Talks covered Church life in Palestine, peace with Israel, regional conflicts, terrorism, and the need for interreligious dialogue.	
133	May 23, 2015	Prime Minister Boyko Borissov (Bulgaria) (3)		
134	May 23, 2015	(North Macedonia) Prime Minister Nikola Gruevski (FYR Macedonia) (3)		
135	May 28, 2015	President Kolinda Grabar-Kitarović (Croatia) (2)	On 28 May 2015, Pope Francis met Croatian President Grabar-Kitarović. Talks focused on Church–State cooperation, youth and family support, the economic crisis, and Croatians in Bosnia-Herzegovina.	
136	May 29, 2015	Prime Minister Miro Cerar (Slovenia) (2)	On 29 May 2015, Pope Francis met Slovenian PM Miro Cerar. Talks focused on strong Church–State ties, national reconciliation, shared values, and cooperation for the common good and support of the poor.	
June 2015
137	June 5, 2015	President Michelle Bachelet (Chile)	Pope Francis met Chilean President Michelle Bachelet. Talks covered strong bilateral ties, human life, education, social peace, the Church’s role in Chile, and key challenges in Latin America.	
138	June 7, 2015	President Cristina Fernández de Kirchner (Argentina) (4)	Pope Francis met privately with Argentine President Cristina Fernández de Kirchner. In a warm meeting, they discussed national matters, exchanged meaningful gifts, and greeted her delegation.	
139	June 10, 2015	President Vladimir Putin (Russia) (2)	On 10 June 2015, Pope Francis met Russian President Vladimir Putin. Talks focused on the Ukraine conflict, urging peace and Minsk accords, and on Middle East crises, stressing protection of all minorities.	
140	June 11, 2015	Prime Minister Stephen Harper (Canada)	On 11 June 2015, Pope Francis met Canadian PM Stephen Harper. They discussed strong Church–State ties, religious freedom, global peace efforts, terrorism, and environmental concerns.	
141	June 12, 2015	Prime Minister Ewa Kopacz (Poland) (3)	On 12 June 2015, Pope Francis met Polish PM Ewa Kopacz. Talks covered preparations for World Youth Day 2016, the Church's role in Poland, ethical issues, and the situation in Ukraine.	
142	June 15, 2015	President Juan Manuel Santos (Colombia) (2)	Pope Francis met Colombian President Juan Manuel Santos to discuss strong Church–State ties, Colombia's reconciliation process, peace prospects, and regional stability and development efforts.	
143	June 16, 2015	(Sovereign Military Order of Malta) Prince and Grand Master Matthew Festing (Order of Malta) (3)		
144	June 25, 2015	(Sovereign Military Order of Malta) Prince and Grand Master Matthew Festing (Order of Malta) (4)		
September 2015
145	September 3, 2015	President Reuven Rivlin (Israel) (3)	Pope Francis met Israel’s President Rivlin to discuss Middle East conflicts, minority rights, interreligious dialogue, Israeli-Palestinian trust, peace talks, and strengthening Israel-Holy See relations.	
146	September 10, 2015	Prime Minister Sheikh Jaber Al-Mubarak Al-Hamad Al-Sabah (Kuwait)	On 10 Sept 2015, Pope Francis met Kuwait’s PM Sheik Jaber Mubarak. They discussed the Christian minority's role, education for coexistence, and signed a Memorandum to boost bilateral ties and peace.	
147	September 11, 2015	President Tomislav Nikolić (Serbia)	On 11 Sept 2015, Pope Francis met Serbia’s President Nikolić to discuss Holy See-Serbia relations, ecumenical dialogue, EU integration, refugee crises, and regional and international cooperation.	
148	September 17, 2015	Prime Minister Xavier Bettel (Luxembourg) (3)	On 17 Sept 2015, Pope Francis met Luxembourg’s PM Bettel to strengthen Holy See-Luxembourg ties, discuss Church-State relations, religious freedom, EU issues, conflicts, migration, and aid for refugees and persecuted minorities.	
149	September 18, 2015	(Council of Europe) Assembly President Anne Brasseur (CoE) (3)		
October 2015
150	October 29, 2015	President Dalia Grybauskaité (Lithuania) (2)	Pope Francis met Lithuania’s President Grybauskaitė to discuss the Church’s role in society, European integration, migrant reception, global peace, the Ukraine conflict, and the situation in the Middle East.	
151	October 29, 2015	(United Nations) Executive Director Yury Fedotov (UN/UNODC) (10)		
152	October 31, 2015	(North Macedonia) President Gjorge Ivanov (FYR Macedonia) (4)	On 31 Oct 2015, Pope Francis met Macedonia’s President Ivanov to discuss EU aspirations, refugee aid, global issues, and promoting coexistence and dialogue among the country’s ethnic and religious groups.	
November 2015
153	November 6, 2015	Governor-General Cécile La Grenade (Grenada) (2)	Pope Francis met Grenada’s Governor General La Grenade to discuss strong Holy See-Grenada ties, the Church’s role in education and social issues, and regional economic and environmental challenges.	
154	November 9, 2015	President Andrzej Duda (Poland) (4)	Pope Francis met Poland’s President Duda to discuss the Church’s role in society, World Youth Day 2016, family support, aid for the needy, migrant reception, global peace, Ukraine, and the Middle East.	
155	November 13, 2015	(Organization of American States) Secretary-General Luis Leonardo Almagro (OAS) (2)		
156	November 20, 2015	President Petro Poroshenko (Ukraine) (2)	On 20 Nov 2015, Pope Francis met Ukraine’s President Poroshenko to discuss the conflict in Ukraine, urge implementation of the Minsk Accords, address the humanitarian crisis, and highlight the Church’s role in society.	
157	November 23, 2015	Governor-General Rodney Williams (Antigua and Barbuda)	On 23 Nov 2015, Pope Francis met Antigua and Barbuda’s Governor General Sir Rodney Williams to discuss strong bilateral ties, the Church’s role in education and aid, and issues like migration and climate change.	
December 2015
158	December 3, 2015	Prime Minister Tuilaʻepa Saʻilele Malielegaoi (Samoa)	On 3 Dec 2015, Pope Francis met Samoa's PM. Talks covered Samoa’s social issues, the Church’s role in education, and climate change challenges facing Pacific island nations.	
159	December 4, 2015	President Benigno Aquino III (Philippines)	On 4 Dec 2015, Pope Francis met Philippine President Aquino. Talks focused on Church–state relations, peace in Mindanao, and climate change, with reference to the COP21 Conference in Paris.	
160	December 14, 2015	President Maithripala Sirisena (Sri Lanka) (2)	On 14 Dec 2015, Pope Francis met Sri Lankan President Sirisena. They discussed peace efforts, the Church’s role, interreligious dialogue, and the outcomes of the Paris climate conference.	

=== 2016 ===
#	Date	Visitor	Notes	Source
January 2016
161	January 18, 2016	(International Monetary Fund) Managing Director Christine Lagarde (UN/IMF) (11)		
162	January 18, 2016	Prince Albert II and Princess Charlene (Monaco)	Pope Francis met Prince Albert II and Princess Charlene of Monaco. Talks covered Church–Monaco ties, environmental protection, humanitarian aid, migration, peace, and the Mediterranean situation.	
163	January 22, 2016	President Charles Savarin (Dominica)	On 22 Jan 2016, Pope Francis received President Charles Angelo Savarin of Dominica. They discussed bilateral relations, the Church’s social contributions (education, aid), and global issues like climate change and natural disasters.	
164	January 26, 2016	President Hassan Rouhani (Iran) (2)	Pope Francis met Iranian President Hassan Rouhani. Talks focused on Church–Iran relations, human dignity, religious freedom, the Nuclear Accord, Middle East peace, and interreligious dialogue.	
165	January 28, 2016	President Faure Gnassingbé (Togo)	Pope Francis met Togo’s President Faure Gnassingbé. They discussed strong Vatican–Togo ties, the Church’s role in education, and regional challenges, emphasizing peace and security in West Africa.	
February 2016
166	February 5, 2016	President Edgar Lungu (Zambia)	On 5 Feb 2016, Pope Francis met Zambian President Edgar Lungu. Talks highlighted Church–state ties, the Church’s social role, peacebuilding, and shared concerns like migration, climate change, and conflict in Africa.	
167	February 10, 2016	Prime Minister Haydar al-Abadi (Iraq) (2)	Pope Francis met Iraqi PM Haydar al-Abadi. They discussed Church–Iraq ties, protecting minorities, interreligious dialogue, and the need for reconciliation, peace, and humanitarian support in the region.	
168	February 27, 2016	President Mauricio Macri (Argentina) (5)	Pope Francis met Argentine President Mauricio Macri. Talks focused on Church–state ties, poverty, human rights, drug trafficking, and the Church’s role in social development amid economic challenges.	
March 2016
169	March 3, 2016	Prime Minister Rui Maria de Araújo (Timor-Leste)	Pope Francis met Timor-Leste PM Rui Maria de Araújo. They discussed strong Church–state ties, the Church’s role in education and poverty relief, and ratified a 2015 Accord guaranteeing Church freedoms.	
170	March 17, 2016	President Marcelo Rebelo de Sousa (Portugal)	Pope Francis met Portuguese President Marcelo Rebelo de Sousa on his first official trip. They discussed strong Church–state ties, human life and family issues, migration, and international concerns.	
171	March 21, 2016	Grand Duke Henri and Grand Duchess Maria Teresa (Luxembourg) (4)		
April 2016
172	April 7, 2025	Prime Minister Tihomir Orešković (Croatia) (3)	Pope Francis met Croatian PM Orešković to discuss strong bilateral ties, Church-state relations, Blessed Stepinac, Croats in Bosnia, and global issues like the refugee crisis and regional conflicts.	
173	April 15, 2016	President Evo Morales (Bolivia) (2)	Pope Francis met Bolivian President Evo Morales to discuss Bolivia's socio-economic issues, Church-state relations, and shared concerns like education, healthcare, poverty, and international matters.	
174	April 18, 2016	President Faustin-Archange Touadéra (Central African Republic)	Pope Francis met CAR President Touadéra to discuss peace efforts, interfaith dialogue, Church contributions to education and healthcare, and strengthening ties amid ongoing post-conflict challenges.	
175	April 25, 2016	King Willem-Alexander and Queen Maxima (Netherlands)		
May 2016
176	May 6, 2016	(European Union) Council President Donald Tusk, Commission President Jean-Claude Juncker, and Parliament President Martin Schulz (EU) (4)		
177	May 6, 2016	Chancellor Angela Merkel (Germany) (3)		
178	May 7, 2016	President Johann Schneider-Ammann (Switzerland) (2)	Pope Francis met Swiss President Schneider-Ammann to discuss strong ties, the Swiss Guard, youth education, migration, and global peace efforts, especially in the Middle East and sub-Saharan Africa.	
179	May 12, 2016	Fumihito, Prince Akishino, and Kiko, Princess Akishino (Japan) (2)		
180	May 13, 2016	Prime Minister Beata Szydło (Poland) (5)	Pope Francis met Polish PM Beata Szydło to discuss Church contributions, his upcoming visit for World Youth Day, family support, refugee reception, and global issues like Syria and Ukraine.	
181	May 16, 2016	President Rosen Plevneliev (Bulgaria) (4)		
182	May 16, 2016	(North Macedonia) Speaker Trajko Valjanoski (FYR Macedonia) (5)		
183	May 21, 2016	President Aleksander Lukashenko (Belarus)	Pope Francis met Belarus President Lukashenko to discuss strong bilateral ties, Church life in Belarus, interfaith harmony, and Minsk’s role in promoting regional peace talks.	
184	May 27, 2016	President Luis Guillermo Solís (Costa Rica) (2)	Pope Francis met Costa Rica’s President Solís to discuss strong Church-state ties, Church work in education and health, shared concerns like life protection, migration, drug trafficking, and global issues.	
185	May 28, 2016	President Tony Tan (Singapore)	Pope Francis met Singapore President Tony Tan to discuss strong Church-state ties, collaboration in education and social work, and the role of interreligious dialogue in promoting peace and human rights.	
June 2016
186	June 4, 2016	Sheikha Moza bint Nasser (Qatar)	Pope Francis met Sheikha Moza of Qatar to discuss her work in education and conflict-affected schools. They exchanged gifts, and later a Vatican-Qatar Library agreement was signed to boost collaboration.	
187	June 15, 2016	Prime Minister Mark Rutte (Netherlands) (2)	Pope Francis met Dutch PM Mark Rutte to discuss strong Holy See–Netherlands ties, shared concerns like migration, and various international issues of mutual interest.	
188	June 16, 2016	Princess Marie-Esméralda (Belgium)		
189	June 23, 2016	(Sovereign Military Order of Malta) Prince and Grand Master Matthew Festing (Order of Malta) (5)		
190	June 23, 2016	(United Nations) (Food and Agriculture Organization) Director-General José Graziano da Silva (UN/FAO) (12)		
September 2016
191	September 15, 2016	(United Nations) High Commissioner Filippo Grandi (UN/UNHCR) (13)		
192	September 26, 2016	(Democratic Republic of the Congo) President Joseph Kabila (DRC)	Pope Francis met DRC President Kabila to discuss Church contributions to education and healthcare, the recent bilateral agreement, political tensions, and the urgent need for peace and aid in eastern DRC.	
October 2016
193	October 5, 2016	(United Nations) Secretary-General Ban Ki-moon (UN) (14)		
194	October 13, 2016	Secretary-General Jens Stoltenberg (NATO)		
195	October 15, 2016	President Mauricio Macri (Argentina) (6)		
196	October 17, 2016	President Borut Pahor (Slovenia) (3)	Pope Francis met Slovenian President Pahor to discuss strong Church-state ties, upcoming 25 years of diplomatic relations, youth-focused collaboration, and regional and European challenges.	
197	October 20, 2016	President Roch Marc Christian Kaboré (Burkina Faso)	Pope Francis met Burkina Faso President Kaboré to discuss strong ties, the Church's role in education and healthcare, interreligious harmony, youth employment, and regional challenges.	
November 2016
198	November 17, 2016	(Organization of American States) Secretary-General José Miguel Insulza (OAS) (3)		
199	November 23, 2016	President Tran Dai Quang (Vietnam) (2)	Pope Francis met Vietnam President Tran Dai Quang to discuss positive Holy See–Vietnam relations, ongoing dialogue, and Church–State collaboration in various areas of Vietnamese society.	
200	November 24, 2016	(United Nations) UNGA President Peter Thomson (UN) (15)		
201	November 28, 2016	(Republic of Ireland) Taoiseach Enda Kenny (Ireland)	Pope Francis met Irish PM Enda Kenny to discuss strong Holy See–Ireland ties, the Church's role in society, dignity of the vulnerable, and European issues like migration, youth employment, and politics.	
December 2016
202	December 2, 2016	President Tabaré Vázquez (Uruguay) (2)	Pope Francis met Uruguay’s President Tabaré Vázquez to discuss strong relations, human rights, the Church’s positive role, democratic development, and the social and humanitarian situation in the region.	
203	December 2, 2016	(United States) Secretary of State John Kerry (USA) (2)		
204	December 15, 2016	(United Nations) High Commissioner Zeid bin Ra'ad (UN/OHCHR) (16)		
205	December 16, 2016	President Juan Manuel Santos (Colombia) (3)	Pope Francis met Colombian President Santos to discuss strong Holy See–Colombia ties, support for the peace process, national reconciliation, and regional issues. He also met Senator Uribe to stress dialogue and unity.	
206	December 17,	President Marie Louise Coleiro Preca (Malta) (4)		

=== 2017 ===
#	Date	Visitor	Notes	Source
January 2017
207	January 14, 2017	President Mahmoud Abbas (Palestine) (3)	Pope Francis met Palestinian President Abbas to discuss strong Holy See–Palestine ties, the Church’s social role, hopes for renewed Middle East peace talks, protection of holy sites, and regional conflicts.	
208	January 16, 2017	President Alpha Condé (Guinea)	Pope Francis met Guinea’s President Alpha Condé to discuss strong ties, human development, environmental care, fighting poverty, migration policies, Church’s social role, interfaith dialogue, and regional peace efforts.	
209	January 20, 2016	President Manuel Cartes (Paraguay) (3)	Pope Francis met Paraguay’s President Cartes to discuss strong Holy See–Paraguay ties, human development, fighting poverty, social peace, the Church’s role in education and aid, and regional democratic progress.	
March 2017
210	March 16, 2017	President Michel Sleiman (Lebanon) (2)	Pope Francis met Lebanese President Aoun to discuss strong ties, the Church’s role, political progress, Syrian conflict, refugee support, and the situation of Christians in the Middle East.	
211	March 20, 2017	President Paul Kagame (Rwanda)	Pope Francis met Rwanda’s President Kagame to affirm strong ties, support reconciliation, express sorrow for the 1994 genocide, and discuss peace, refugees, and the Church’s role in healing and unity.	
212	March 23, 2017	President Paul Biya (Cameroon) (2)	Pope Francis met Cameroon’s President Biya to discuss strong ties, the Church’s role in education and healthcare, interreligious harmony, national cohesion, and regional challenges.	
213	March 24, 2017	President Jioji Konrote (Fiji)	Pope Francis met Fiji’s President Konrote to discuss strong ties, the Church’s role, climate change and its ethical impact, solidarity with the vulnerable, and Fiji’s contribution to UN peace missions.	
214	March 24, 2017	(European Union) Council President Donald Tusk, Commission President Jean-Claude Juncker, and Parliament President Antonio Tajani (Austria) Federal Chancellor Christian Kern (Belgium) Prime Minister Charles Michel (Bulgaria) President Rumen Radev (Croatia) Prime Minister Andrej Plenković (Cyprus) President Nicos Anastasiades (Czech Republic) Prime Minister Bohuslav Sobotka (Denmark) Prime Minister Lars Løkke Rasmussen (Estonia) Prime Minister Jüri Ratas (Finland) Prime Minister Juha Sipilä (France) President François Hollande (Germany) Federal Chancellor Angela Merkel (Greece) Prime Minister Alexis Tsipras (Hungary) Prime Minister Viktor Orbán (Republic of Ireland) Taoiseach Enda Kenny (Italy) Prime Minister Paolo Gentiloni (Latvia) Prime Minister Māris Kučinskis (Lithuania) President Dalia Grybauskaitė (Luxembourg) Prime Minister Xavier Bettel (Malta) Prime Minister Joseph Muscat (Netherlands) Prime Minister Mark Rutte (Poland) Prime Minister Beata Szydło (Portugal) Prime Minister António Costa (Romania) President Klaus Iohannis (Slovakia) Prime Minister Robert Fico (Slovenia) Prime Minister Miro Cerar (Spain) Prime Minister Mariano Rajoy (Sweden) Prime Minister Stefan Löfven (EU) (5)	Pope Francis received EU leaders and their delegations in the Apostolic Palace to mark the 60th anniversary of the Treaties of Rome, highlighting the importance of unity and shared European values.	
April 2017
215	April 22, 2017	Prince Hans-Adam II and Princess Marie, and Hereditary Prince Alois and Hereditary Princess Sophie (Liechtenstein)	Pope Francis met Princes Hans Adam II and Alois of Liechtenstein to discuss strong Holy See–Liechtenstein ties, the Church’s role in the country, and the Principality’s commitment to human rights.	
May 2017
216	May 4, 2017	State Counsellor Aung San Suu Kyi (Myanmar)	The Holy See and Myanmar have agreed to establish full diplomatic relations, with an Apostolic Nunciature and an Embassy, to strengthen mutual friendship and cooperation.	
217	May 6, 2017	President Doris Leuthard (Switzerland) (3)	Pope Francis met Swiss President Leuthard to discuss strong ties, the Swiss Guard, Church–State collaboration, and shared concerns: Europe's future, migration, youth employment, terrorism, and the environment.	
218	May 22, 2017	(Republic of Ireland) President Michael D. Higgins (Ireland) (2)	Pope Francis met Irish President Michael D. Higgins to discuss strong Holy See–Ireland ties, human dignity, migration, care for the environment, youth and families, ethics in globalization, and Europe’s future.	
219	May 26, 2017	President Rumen Radev (Bulgaria) (5)		
220	May 26, 2017	President Gjorge Ivanov (North Macedonia) (6)		
221	May 29, 2017	Prime Minister Justin Trudeau (Canada) (2)	Pope Francis met Canadian PM Justin Trudeau to discuss strong Holy See–Canada ties, the Church’s social role, reconciliation, religious freedom, ethical issues, and global concerns, especially the Middle East.	
June 2017
222	June 1, 2017	Presidency Member Dragan Čović (Bosnia and Herzegovina) (3)	Pope Francis met Čović of Bosnia and Herzegovina to discuss strong ties, the country's challenges and EU aspirations, peace, reconciliation, interreligious dialogue, and the Catholic community’s role.	
223	June 2, 2017	President Raimonds Vējonis (Latvia) (2)	Pope Francis met Latvian President Raimonds Vējonis to discuss strong ties, the Church’s role in society, migrant reception, and the future of the European project in the regional context.	
224	June 17, 2017	Chancellor Angela Merkel (Germany) (4)	Pope Francis met German Chancellor Angela Merkel to discuss strong Holy See–Germany ties, the G20 summit, global challenges like poverty, terrorism, and climate change, and to honor Helmut Kohl’s legacy.	
225	June 22, 2017	King Willem-Alexander and Queen Maxima (Netherlands) (3)	Pope Francis met King Willem-Alexander and Queen Máxima of the Netherlands to discuss shared concerns: environment, poverty, migration, cultural coexistence, peace, global security, and Europe’s future.	
226	June 23, 2017	(Sovereign Military Order of Malta) Lieutenant of the Grand Master Giacomo Dalla Torre (Order of Malta) (6)		
September 2017
227	September 1, 2017	(United Nations) Secretary-General Houlin Zhao (UN/ITU) (17)		
228	September 15, 2017	President Silvia Fernández de Gurmendi (ICC)		
229	September 22, 2017	President Pedro Pablo Kuczynski (Peru) (2)	Pope Francis met Peruvian President Pedro Pablo Kuczynski to discuss strong ties, the Pope’s upcoming visit, youth education, poverty, environmental protection, and the Church’s role in Peruvian society.	
October 2017
230	October 6, 2017	Prime Minister Saulius Skvernelis (Lithuania) (3)	Pope Francis met Lithuanian PM Saulius Skvernelis to discuss strong Church–state ties, the beatification of Archbishop Matulionis, youth emigration, migrants, and peace in Europe and globally.	
231	October 7, 2017	Prime Minister Andrej Plenković (Croatia) (4)	Pope Francis met Croatian PM Andrej Plenković to discuss strong Holy See–Croatia ties, the Church’s role in society, Cardinal Stepinac’s legacy, EU prospects, and Croats’ situation in Bosnia-Herzegovina.	
232	October 9, 2017	President Frank-Walter Steinmeier (Germany) (5)	Pope Francis met German President Frank-Walter Steinmeier to discuss strong Holy See–Germany ties, interreligious dialogue amid the Reformation anniversary, and shared concerns like migration and solidarity.	
233	October 13, 2017	Prime Minister Saad Hariri (Lebanon) (3)	Pope Francis met Lebanese Prime Minister Saad Hariri to discuss Lebanon’s stability, refugee support, and peace efforts in the Middle East. They emphasized Christian-Muslim dialogue and the Church’s key role.	
234	October 28, 2017	(European Union) Commission Vice-President Frans Timmermans, Parliament President Antonio Tajani, and Parliament Vice-President Mairead McGuinness (EU) (6)		
November 2017
235	November 4, 2017	President Igor Dodon (Moldova)	Pope Francis met with Moldovan President Igor Dodon to discuss strong bilateral ties and the Church’s positive role in Moldova, especially in ecumenism, education, and charity. They also addressed family values, and regional and global peace and security.	
236	November 9, 2017	President Manuel Cartes (Paraguay) (4)	Pope Francis met with Paraguayan President Horacio Manuel Cartes Jara for cordial discussions focusing on education, social promotion, and regional issues.	
237	November 11, 2017	President Ernest Bai Koroma (Sierra Leone)	Pope Francis met Sierra Leone's President Koroma, highlighting strong ties, the Church’s role in rebuilding, religious harmony, and shared views on regional and global challenges.	
238	November 16, 2017	President Alexander Van der Bellen (Austria) (2)	Pope Francis met Austria’s President Van der Bellen. They discussed strong Holy See–Austria ties, human dignity, environmental care, global peace efforts, and support for nuclear disarmament.	
December 2017
239	December 7, 2017	Prime Minister Denis Zvizdić (Bosnia and Herzegovina) (4)	Pope Francis met with Denis Zvizdić, Chairman of Bosnia and Herzegovina’s Council of Ministers. They discussed EU integration, economic challenges, the Catholic community, and peaceful coexistence.	
240	December 15, 2017	President Evo Morales (Bolivia) (3)	This morning, Pope Francis received Bolivian President Evo Morales at the Vatican. They appreciated the Church’s role in Bolivia’s social and cultural progress and discussed updating bilateral agreements and shared interests.	
241	December 16, 2017	President Lenin Moreno (Ecuador) (3)	This morning, Pope Francis received Ecuador’s President Lenín Moreno at the Vatican. They discussed Christianity’s role in national identity, respect for indigenous cultures, environmental protection, and regional development efforts.	
242	December 19, 2017	King Abdullah II of Jordan (Jordan) (3)	This morning, Pope Francis received King Abdullah II of Jordan. They discussed peace and stability in the Middle East, Jerusalem’s significance, inter-religious dialogue, and supporting Christians in the region.	

=== 2018 ===
#	Date	Visitor	Notes	Source
January 2018
243	January 25, 2018	President Faustin-Archange Touadéra (Central African Republic) (2)	Pope Francis met Central African Republic President Touadéra. Talks praised strong ties, peace efforts, and Church support, urging unity and international aid for national reconciliation.	
244	January 26, 2018	President Jovenel Moïse (Haiti) (2)	Pope Francis met Haitian President Jovenel Moïse. Talks praised strong ties, Church aid in education and health, and urged dialogue to address emigration and social challenges.	
245	February 5, 2018	(Turkey) President Recep Tayyip Erdoğan (Türkiye)	Pope Francis met Turkish President Erdoğan. Talks addressed Church–Turkey ties, refugee aid, and Middle East peace, stressing dialogue, human rights, and Jerusalem’s status.	
246	February 8, 2018	Prime Minister Jüri Ratas (Estonia)	Pope Francis met Estonian Prime Minister Jüri Ratas. Talks praised strong ties, Church contributions, and addressed migration, environmental protection, and global peace efforts.	
247	February 12, 2018	Prime Minister Sheikh Hasina (Bangladesh)	Pope Francis met Bangladesh PM Sheikh Hasina. Talks praised strong ties, Church education work, peaceful coexistence, and support for Rohingya refugees, seeking lasting solutions.	
248	February 24, 2018	President of the Presidency Dragan Čović, and Presidency Members Mladen Ivanić and Bakir Izetbegović (Bosnia and Herzegovina) (5)	Pope Francis met Bosnia and Herzegovina’s Presidency. Talks praised strong ties, urged interreligious dialogue, social and economic reforms, EU integration, equality, and regional cooperation.	
March 2018
249	March 5, 2018	President Heinz Fischer (Austria) (3)	Pope Francis met Austrian Chancellor Kurz. Talks praised strong ties, emphasized life, family, and social welfare, and addressed EU solidarity, peace, nuclear disarmament, and migration.	
250	March 16, 2018	(United Nations) (United Nations Relief and Works Agency for Palestine Refugees in the Near East) Commissioner-general Pierre Krähenbül (UN/UNRWA) (18)		
251	March 23, 2018	Captains Regent Matteo Fiorini and Enrico Carattoni (San Marino) (3)	Pope Francis met San Marino’s Captains Regent. Talks praised strong ties, Church contributions, and discussed migration, Europe’s future, and international issues.	
April 2018
252	April 5, 2018	President Serzh Sargsyan (Armenia) (2)	Pope Francis met Armenian President Sargsyan. Talks praised strong ties, celebrated St. Gregory of Narek, and addressed regional conflicts, Christians’ plight, and international issues.	
253	April 30, 2018	(United Nations) UNGA President Miroslav Lajčák (UN) (19)		
May 2018
254	May 11, 2018	Prime Minister Viorica Dăncilă (Romania) (3)	Pope Francis met Romanian Prime Minister Viorica Dăncilă. They discussed strong bilateral ties, educational cooperation, social harmony, and future prospects for the European Union.	
255	May 18, 2018	President Patrice Talon (Benin) (2)	Pope Francis met Benin’s President Talon. Talks praised strong ties, Church contributions in education and healthcare, and addressed development, poverty, interreligious dialogue, and regional challenges.	
256	May 25, 2018	Prime Minister Boyko Borissov (Bulgaria) (6)		
257	May 25, 2018	(North Macedonia) Prime Minister Zoran Zaev (FYR Macedonia) (7)		
June 2018
258	June 4, 2018	Prime Minister Mateusz Morawiecki (Poland) (6)	Pope Francis met Polish Prime Minister Mateusz Morawiecki. Talks praised strong ties, Church–State collaboration, family and environmental issues, ethical matters, and Poland’s support for refugees.	
259	June 25, 2018	Governor-General Peter Cosgrove (Australia)	Pope Francis met Australian Governor General Sir Peter Cosgrove. Talks addressed migration, climate change, Church efforts to protect minors, and peace and stability in the Pacific and Asia.	
260	June 26, 2018	President Emmanuel Macron (France) (2)	Pope Francis met French President Emmanuel Macron. Talks praised strong ties, the Church’s social role, and addressed climate, migration, disarmament, global conflicts, and the future of the European project.	
261	June 30, 2018	President Evo Morales (Bolivia) (4)	Pope Francis met Bolivian President Evo Morales. Talks highlighted strong Holy See–Bolivia relations, progress on bilateral agreements, and included an exchange on regional issues.	
September 2018
262	September 14, 2018	President Filipe Nyusi (Mozambique) (3)		
263	September 17, 2018	President Ilir Meta (Albania) (2)	Pope Francis met Albanian President Ilir Meta. Talks praised strong ties, the Church’s social role, religious freedom, interreligious dialogue, EU integration, and Balkan regional issues.	
264	September 17, 2018	(United Nations) Director-General William L. Swing (UN/IOM) (20)		
265	September 26, 2018	Vice-President Mehriban Aliyeva (Azerbaijan) (2)		
October 2018
266	October 8, 2018	President Milo Đukanović (Montenegro) (2)	Pope Francis met Montenegrin President Milo Ðjukanović. Talks praised strong ties, Church contributions, EU integration, interfaith harmony, environmental protection, and global conflict resolution.	
267	October 13, 2018	President Sebastián Piñera (Chile) (2)	Pope Francis met Chilean President Sebastián Piñera. Talks praised strong ties, addressed protection of life, abuse prevention efforts, and discussed migration and regional cooperation.	
268	October 15, 2018	President Andrzej Duda (Poland) (7)	Pope Francis met Polish President Andrzej Duda. Talks marked 40 years since St. John Paul II’s election, stressing Christian values, family, hospitality, EU role, Ukraine, migration, and climate issues.	
269	October 18, 2018	President Moon Jae-in (South Korea) (2)	Pope Francis met South Korean President Moon Jae-in. Talks praised strong ties, the Church’s social role, efforts for Korean reconciliation, and initiatives promoting peace and regional stability.	
270	October 19, 2018	(United Nations) (World Health Organization) Director-General Tedros Adhanom Ghebreyesus (UN/WHO) (21)		
271	October 20, 2018	Deputy Prime Minister Truong Hoa Binh (Vietnam) (3)		
272	October 22, 2018	President Iván Duque (Colombia) (4)	Pope Francis met Colombian President Iván Duque. Talks praised strong ties, Church support for peace and reconciliation, and addressed social issues, corruption, environment, and migration.	
273	October 29, 2018	(United Nations) UNGA President María Fernanda Espinosa (UN) (22)		
November 2018
274	November 5, 2018	President Mario Abdo Benítez (Paraguay) (5)	Pope Francis met Paraguayan President Mario Abdo Benítez. Talks praised strong ties, Christian values, the Church’s social role, and addressed family support, poverty, corruption, and regional issues.	
275	November 8, 2018	Crown Prince Frederik and Crown Princess Mary (Denmark)		
276	November 12, 2018	President Alain Berset (Switzerland) (4)	Pope Francis met Swiss President Alain Berset to discuss Swiss Guard service, strong bilateral ties, and collaboration on migration, peace, disarmament, and human rights.	
277	November 15, 2018	President Reuven Rivlin (Israel) (4)	Pope Francis met Israeli President Reuven Rivlin to mark 25 years of diplomatic ties, discussing mutual trust, Israel-Palestine peace, Jerusalem’s status, regional conflicts, and interreligious dialogue.	
278	November 15, 2018	(United Nations) Director-General Henrietta H. Fore (UN/UNICEF) (23)		
279	November 24, 2018	President Barham Salih (Iraq) (3)	Pope Francis met Iraqi President Salih to discuss Vatican-Iraq ties, political reconciliation, Christian communities’ role, safe return of displaced people, and regional conflicts requiring dialogue and peace.	
December 2018
280	December 3, 2018	President Mahmoud Abbas (Palestine) (4)	Pope Francis met Palestinian President Mahmoud Abbas to discuss Vatican-Palestine ties, Christian presence, reconciliation, Israel-Palestine peace, Jerusalem’s status, and regional peace efforts.	
281	December 14, 2018	President Andrej Kiska (Slovakia) (2)	Pope Francis met Slovak President Andrej Kiska to discuss strong bilateral ties, the Church’s role in education, climate change, migration, and European peace and cooperation ahead of Slovakia’s 2019 OSCE Presidency.	
282	December 15, 2018	Prime Minister Giuseppe Conte (Italy) (4)		
283	December 17, 2018	(United Nations) Director-General Audrey Azoulay (UN/UNESCO) (24)		

=== 2019 ===
#	Date	Visitor	Notes	Source
January 2019
284	January 14, 2019	Senate President Elisabetta Casellati (Italy) (5)		
285	January 17, 2019	(Council of Europe) Secretary-General Thorbjørn Jagland (CoE) (4)		
286	January 21, 2019	Prime Minister Abiy Ahmed (Ethiopia)	Pope Francis met Ethiopian PM Abiy Ahmed to discuss Vatican-Ethiopia ties, reconciliation, Christian contributions, regional peace, and Horn of Africa stabilization.	
March 2019
287	March 5, 2019	President Faustin-Archange Touadéra (Central African Republic) (3)	Pope Francis met Central African President Touadéra to discuss Vatican ties, Catholic contributions, national reconciliation, peace, and support for displaced people.	
288	March 16, 2019	President Salva Kiir (South Sudan)	Pope Francis met South Sudan’s President Salva Kiir to discuss peace, national reconciliation, refugee return, development, and a possible papal visit to support the country’s peace process.	
289	March 21, 2019	President Marie-Louise Coleiro Preca (Malta) (5)	Pope Francis met Malta’s President Marie-Louise Coleiro Preca to discuss Church-State cooperation, youth development, European integration, migration, Mediterranean issues, and interreligious dialogue.	
290	March 28, 2019	President Dalia Grybauskaité (Lithuania) (4)	Pope Francis met Lithuania’s President Dalia Grybauskaitė to discuss Church–State relations, national social and political issues, peace, security, and solidarity in addressing Europe’s challenges.	
April 2019
291	April 25, 2019	President Raimonds Vējonis (Latvia) (3)	Pope Francis met Latvia’s President Raimonds Vējonis to discuss Church–State ties, Latvia’s social and religious situation, regional peace, Europe’s future, and environmental protection.	
292	April 26, 2019	President of the Presidency Milorad Dodik (Bosnia and Herzegovina) (6)	Pope Francis met Bosnia and Herzegovina’s President Milorad Dodik to discuss Church presence, social and economic challenges, reconciliation, equality, dialogue, and EU enlargement in the Western Balkans.	
293	April 29, 2019	President Faure Gnassingbé (Togo) (2)	Pope Francis met Togo’s President Faure Gnassingbé to discuss strengthening ties, the Church’s role in education and healthcare, and joint efforts for security, stability, and peace in West Africa.	
May 2019
294	May 23, 2019	(United Nations) Secretary-General Zurab Pololikashvili (UN/UNWTO) (25)		
295	May 24, 2019	Speaker Tsveta Karayancheva (Bulgaria) (7)		
296	May 24, 2019	Speaker Talat Xhaferi (North Macedonia) (8)		
June 2019
297	June 27, 2019	Prime Minister Marjan Šarec (Slovenia) (4)	Pope Francis met Slovenia’s Prime Minister Marjan Šarec to discuss strengthening bilateral ties, Church contributions to education, and international issues including Europe’s future and regional challenges.	
298	June 28, 2019	(Sovereign Military Order of Malta) Prince and Grand Master Giacomo Dalla Torre (Order of Malta) (7)		
July 2019
299	July 4, 2019	President Vladimir Putin (Russia) (3)	Pope Francis met Russian President Vladimir Putin to discuss strengthened bilateral ties, Church life in Russia, hospital cooperation, ecology, and international issues in Syria, Ukraine, and Venezuela.	
September 2019
300	September 12, 2019	President Aleksandar Vučić (Serbia) (2)	Pope Francis met Serbia’s President Aleksandar Vučić to discuss strong bilateral ties, the Church’s social role, Serbia’s EU integration, regional cooperation, peace, and interreligious reconciliation.	
301	September 16, 2019	President George Vella (Malta) (6)	Pope Francis met Malta’s President George Vella to discuss strong bilateral ties, the Church’s role in education, migration challenges, environmental protection, and regional issues in the Mediterranean.	
October 2019
302	October 2, 2019	Prince Hassan bin Talal (Jordan) (4)		
303	October 3, 2019	(United States) Secretary of State Mike Pompeo (USA) (3)		
304	October 5, 2019	(European Union) Council President Donald Tusk (EU) (7)		
November 2019
305	November 8, 2019	President Gitanas Nausėda (Lithuania) (5)	Pope Francis met Lithuania’s President Gitanas Nausėda to discuss strong ties, the Church’s social role, family and justice issues, and European solidarity amid the Ukraine conflict and regional challenges.	
306	November 12, 2019	President João Lourenço (Angola) (2)	Pope Francis met Angola’s President João Lourenço to discuss strong bilateral ties, the Church’s social role, the recent Vatican-Angola Agreement, and efforts to foster development and social peace.	
307	November 12, 2019	(United Nations) (Food and Agriculture Organization) Director-General Qu Dongyu (UN/FAO) (26)		
308	November 16, 2019	(Cape Verde) President Jorge Carlos Fonseca (Cabo Verde) (3)	Pope Francis met Cabo Verde’s President Jorge Carlos Fonseca to discuss implementing the 2014 Agreement, moral education, Manuel’s beatification, migration, and peace in West Africa.	
309	November 28, 2019	President Nicos Anastasiades (Cyprus) (2)	Pope Francis met Cyprus’ President Anastasiades to discuss bilateral ties, Cyprus’ reunification, migration, religious freedom, minority rights, and peace and stability in the Eastern Mediterranean.	
310	November 28, 2019	President Kersti Kaljulaid (Estonia)	Pope Francis met Estonia’s President Kersti Kaljulaid to discuss strong bilateral ties, education, social justice, environmental protection, peace, Ukraine, and Europe’s future challenges.	
December 2019
311	December 7, 2019	Foreign Minsiter Sameh Shoukry (Egypt) (2)		
312	December 7, 2019	Prime Minister Joseph Muscat (Malta) (7)		
313	December 9, 2019	Prime Minister Peter Pellegrini (Slovakia) (3)	Pope Francis met Slovakia’s Prime Minister Pellegrini to discuss strong bilateral ties, education, religious freedom, minorities, social justice, and regional issues including Ukraine and the Western Balkans.	
314	December 14, 2019	Prime Minister Duško Marković (Montenegro) (3)	Pope Francis met Montenegro’s Prime Minister Duško Marković to discuss strong bilateral ties, interreligious coexistence, Europe’s future, religious challenges, and migration.	
315	December 20, 2019	(United Nations) Secretary-General António Guterres (UN) (27)		

=== 2020 ===
#	Date	Visitor	Notes	Source
January 2020
316	January 17, 2020	(Democratic Republic of the Congo) President Félix Tshisekedi (DRC) (2)	Pope Francis met DRC President Félix Tshisekedi to discuss bilateral ties, the Church’s role in democracy, education, health, peace in the east, Ebola, and aid for refugees and displaced people.	
317	January 24, 2020	(United States) Vice-President Mike Pence (USA) (4)		
318	January 25, 2020	President Barham Salih (Iraq) (4)	Pope Francis met Iraq’s President Barham Salih to discuss stability, reconstruction, dialogue, protection of Christians, national unity, and regional peace amid ongoing conflicts and humanitarian crises.	
319	January 31, 2020	President Alberto Fernández (Argentina) (7)	Pope Francis met Argentina’s President Alberto Fernández to discuss strong ties, the economic crisis, poverty, corruption, life protection, and the Church’s support for Argentina’s most vulnerable.	
February 2020
320	February 3, 2020	Crown Prince Salman bin Hamad Al Khalifa (Bahrain) (2)		
321	February 6, 2020	Prime Minister Andrej Plenković (Croatia) (5)	Pope Francis met Croatia’s Prime Minister Andrej Plenković to discuss strong bilateral ties, Croatia’s EU Council presidency, European challenges, Croats in Bosnia, migration, peace, and security.	
322	February 8, 2020	President Volodymyr Zelenskyy (Ukraine) (3)	Pope Francis met Ukraine’s President Volodymyr Zelenskyy to discuss the humanitarian situation, peace efforts amid the conflict, bilateral cooperation, and the Church’s contribution in Ukraine.	
323	February 13, 2020	President Ibrahim Boubacar Keïta (Mali)	Pope Francis met Mali’s President Ibrahim Boubacar Keïta to discuss strong ties, security and humanitarian issues, terrorism, food insecurity in the Sahel, migration, and peacekeeping in West Africa.	
324	February 14, 2020	President János Áder (Hungary) (2)	Pope Francis met Hungary’s President János Áder to discuss strong bilateral ties, upcoming Eucharistic Congress, social justice, family, environmental protection, and Europe’s present and future.	
325	February 15, 2020	President of the Presidency Željko Komšić (Bosnia and Herzegovina) (7)	Pope Francis met Bosnia and Herzegovina’s Chairman Željko Komšić to discuss strong ties, the Catholic community, citizens’ equality, dialogue, peace, and EU enlargement in the Western Balkans.	
326	February 22, 2020	President Ilham Aliyev (Azerbaijan) (3)	Pope Francis met Azerbaijan’s President Ilham Aliyev to discuss strong bilateral ties, cultural cooperation, the Church’s role, and promoting interreligious dialogue and peaceful coexistence.	
March 2020
327	March 30, 2020	Prime Minister Giuseppe Conte (Italy) (5)		
June 2020
328	June 12, 2020	President of Constitutional Court Marta Cartabia (Italy) (6)		
329	June 25, 2020	(United Nations) President Gilbert Houngbo (UN/IFAD) (28)		
August 2020
330	August 20, 2020	(United Nations) High Commissioner Michelle Bachelet (UN/OHCHR) (29)		
September 2020
331	September 3, 2020	President Chile Eboe-Osuji (ICC) (2)		
332	September 5, 2020	Captains Regent Alessandro Mancini and Gloria Zafferani (San Marino) (4)	Pope Francis met San Marino’s Captains Regent Alessandro Mancini and Grazia Zafferani to discuss historic ties, the Church’s role, the health emergency, and international and European affairs.	
333	September 21, 2020	(Council of Europe) Assembly President Rik Deams (CoE) (5)		
334	September 25, 2020	President Andrzej Duda (Poland) (8)	Pope Francis met Poland’s President Andrzej Duda to discuss Saint John Paul II, Solidarność, family and youth education, and international issues including the health emergency, regional stability, and security.	
October 2020
335	October 24, 2020	Prime Minister Pedro Sánchez (Spain) (4)	Pope Francis met Spain’s Prime Minister Pedro Sánchez to discuss bilateral ties, Church–State dialogue, the health crisis, European integration, and migration.	
November 2020
336	November 6, 2020	President Uhuru Kenyatta (Kenya)	Pope Francis met Kenya’s President Uhuru Kenyatta to discuss bilateral ties, the Church’s role in education and healthcare, the pandemic, climate change, refugees, and Kenya’s multilateral contributions.	
337	November 7, 2020	Vice-President María Alejandra Muñoz (Ecuador) (4)		
338	November 20, 2020	(United Nations) (Food and Agriculture Organization) Director-General Qu Dongyu (UN/FAO) (30)		
December 2020
339	December 14, 2020	President Zuzana Čaputová (Slovakia) (4)	Pope Francis met Slovakia’s President Zuzana Čaputová to discuss bilateral ties, education, the Church’s role, COVID-19, social justice, environmental protection, security, migration, and Europe’s future.	

=== 2021 ===
#	Date	Visitor	Notes	Source
January 2021
340	January 28, 2021	(United Nations) Executive Director Davis Beasley (UN/WFP) (31)		
March 2021
341	March 12, 2021	President Marcelo Rebelo de Sousa (Portugal) (2)	Pope Francis met Portugal’s President Marcelo Rebelo de Sousa to discuss strong ties, the Church’s role, the health crisis, life protection, social harmony, EU presidency, multilateralism, and peace efforts.	
342	March 15, 2021	Captains Regent Alessandro Cardelli and Mirko Dolcini (San Marino) (5)	Pope Francis met San Marino’s Captains Regent to discuss bilateral ties, Europe, multilateral diplomacy, the health crisis, family policies, migration, and humanitarian initiatives.	
343	March 25, 2021	Prime Minister Denys Shmyhal (Ukraine) (4)	Pope Francis met Ukraine’s Prime Minister Denys Shmyhal to discuss strong bilateral ties, the Church’s role, the health crisis, and the conflict in eastern Ukraine, seeking peaceful resolution.	
April 2021
344	April 9, 2021	Vice-President Teodoro Nguema Obiang Mangue (Equatorial Guinea) (2)		
345	April 16, 2021	(United Nations) High Commissioner Filippo Grandi (UN/UNHCR) (32)		
May 2021
346	May 3, 2021	Foreign Minister Fuad Hussein (Iraq) (5)		
347	May 6, 2021	President Guy Parmelin (Switzerland) (5)	Pope Francis met Switzerland’s President Guy Parmelin to discuss bilateral ties, the Swiss Guard, the centenary of relations, and cooperation on international issues and mutual interests.	
348	May 10, 2021	President Egils Levits (Latvia) (4)	Pope Francis met Latvia’s President Egils Levits to discuss strong ties, the Church’s role in humanism, dignity, and family, and collaboration on international and regional issues promoting peace and fraternity.	
349	May 11, 2021	Foreign Minister Heiko Maas (Germany)		
350	May 13, 2021	President Alberto Fernández (Argentina) (8)	Pope Francis met Argentina’s President Alberto Fernández to discuss bilateral ties, the COVID-19 response, economic crisis, poverty, the Church’s support, and regional and international issues.	
351	May 17, 2021	Foreign Minister Mohammad Javad Zarif (Iran) (3)		
352	May 22, 2021	(European Union) Commission President Ursula von der Leyen (EU) (8)	Pope Francis met EU Commission President Ursula von der Leyen to discuss Holy See–EU relations, Europe’s social development, the pandemic, migration, climate change, and Middle East developments.	
353	May 27, 2021	President Rumen Radev (Bulgaria) (8)		
354	May 27, 2021	(North Macedonia) President Stevo Pendarovski (FYR Macedonia) (9)		
June 2021
355	June 7, 2021	President Alexander Van der Bellen (Austria) (4)	Pope Francis met Austria’s President Alexander Van der Bellen to discuss bilateral ties, European and global issues, and the Church’s role in promoting peace, solidarity, fraternity, and care for creation.	
356	June 14, 2021	(United Nations) (International Atomic Energy Agency) Director-General Rafael Grossi (UN/IAEA) (33)		
357	June 18, 2016	(Georgia (country)) President Salome Zourabichvili (Georgia) (2)	Pope Francis met Georgia’s President Salomé Zourabichvili to discuss bilateral ties, culture, science, education, the Church’s role, and regional humanitarian, justice, and social harmony issues.	
358	June 26, 2021	(European Union) Parliament President David Sassoli (EU) (9)		
359	June 28, 2021	(United States) Secretary of State Antony Blinken (USA) (5)		
July 2021
360	July 2, 2021	Prime Minister Mustafa Al-Kadhimi (Iraq) (2)	Pope Francis met Iraq’s Prime Minister Mustafa Al-Kadhimi to discuss his historic visit, national dialogue, reconstruction, protection of Christians, equal rights, and regional peace efforts.	
September 2021
361	September 3, 2021	Prime Minister Ingrida Šimonytė (Lithuania) (6)	Pope Francis met Lithuania’s PM Ingrida Šimonytė to discuss bilateral ties, the Church’s role in family and moral values, pandemic response, regional peace, and humanitarian crises, including Afghanistan.	
362	September 9, 2021	President Sebastián Piñera (Chile) (3)	Pope Francis met Chile’s President Sebastián Piñera to discuss bilateral ties, peace, social justice, support for the vulnerable, socio-economic development, Church cooperation, and global human rights.	
363	September 11, 2021	(European Union) Council President Charles Michel (EU) (10)		
364	September 17, 2021	(Republic of Ireland) President Michael D. Higgins (Ireland) (3)	Pope Francis met Ireland’s President Michael D. Higgins to discuss migration, environmental protection, COP26, pandemic consequences, Europe’s future, and strengthening Ireland’s peace process.	
October 2021
365	October 7, 2021	Chancellor Angela Merkel (Germany) (6)	Pope Francis met Germany’s Chancellor Angela Merkel to discuss strong bilateral ties, Holy See–Germany cooperation, international and regional issues, and joint responses to the health crisis and migration.	
366	October 8, 2021	Prime Minister Robert Abela (Malta) (8)	Pope Francis met Malta’s PM Robert Abela to discuss bilateral ties, Church–State cooperation, education, welfare, migration, ethical issues, Mediterranean affairs, and interreligious dialogue for peace.	
367	October 9, 2021	(United States) Speaker Nancy Pelosi (USA) (6)		
368	October 11, 2021	President Armen Sarkissian (Armenia) (3)	Pope Francis met Armenia’s President Armen Sarkissian to discuss strong bilateral ties, Armenia’s Christian heritage, and other regional and international policy matters.	
369	October 18, 2021	Prime Minister Jean Castex (France) (3)		
370	October 23, 2021	Vice-President and Foreign Minister Marta Lucía Ramírez (Colombia) (5)		
371	October 25, 2021	President Frank-Walter Steinmeier (Germany) (7)	Pope Francis met Germany’s President Frank-Walter Steinmeier to discuss internal political developments, migration, international conflicts, and the importance of multilateral efforts for solutions.	
372	October 29, 2021	President Moon Jae-in (South Korea) (3)	Pope Francis met South Korea’s President Moon Jae-in to discuss bilateral ties, the Church’s role in dialogue and reconciliation, peace and development on the peninsula, and regional and humanitarian issues.	
373	October 29, 2021	(United States) President Joe Biden (USA) (7)	Pope Francis met U.S. President Joe Biden to discuss climate care, COVID-19, refugees and migrants, human rights, freedom of religion, international affairs, the G20, and global peace through diplomacy.	
374	October 30, 2021	Prime Minister Narendra Modi (India)	Pope Francis met India’s Prime Minister Narendra Modi to discuss cordial bilateral relations between the Holy See and India.	
November 2021
375	November 4, 2021	President Mahmoud Abbas (Palestine) (5)	Pope Francis met Palestine’s President Abbas to discuss bilateral ties, interfaith brotherhood, Israeli-Palestinian peace, a two-state solution, Jerusalem’s status, and combating extremism and conflict.	
376	November 6, 2021	Senate President Maulen Ashimbayev (Kazakhstan)		
377	November 15, 2021	President Zoran Milanović (Croatia) (6)	Pope Francis met Croatia’s President Zoran Milanović to discuss strong bilateral ties, further collaboration, and regional and international issues, including the situation of Croatians in Bosnia and Herzegovina.	
378	November 22, 2021	Secretary-General Louise Mushikiwabo (OIF) (2)		
379	November 25, 2021	Prime Minister Najib Mikati (Lebanon) (4)	Pope Francis met Lebanon’s PM Najib Mikati to discuss bilateral ties, the Church’s role, political and economic crisis, reforms, international support, and promoting peace and coexistence in Lebanon.	
380	November 26, 2021	President Emmanuel Macron (France) (4)	Pope Francis met France’s President Emmanuel Macron to discuss strong bilateral ties, COP26 climate outcomes, France’s EU presidency, and its role in Lebanon, the Middle East, and Africa.	
381	November 27, 2021	Prime Minister Edi Rama (Albania) (3)	Pope Francis met Albania’s Prime Minister Edi Rama to discuss strong bilateral ties, Church–State cooperation, migration, peace, and regional issues including Western Balkans and EU integration progress.	
December 2021
382	December 11, 2021	Deputy Prime Minister Yolanda Díaz (Spain) (5)		
383	December 16, 2021	President Sergio Mattarella (Italy) (7)	Pope Francis met Italy’s President Sergio Mattarella to discuss strong bilateral ties, pandemic response and vaccination, family and youth education, demographics, migration, Africa, and European democratic values.	

=== 2022 ===
#	Date	Visitor	Notes	Source
January 2022
384	January 8, 2022	Senate President Tomasz Grodzki (Poland) (9)		
385	January 17, 2022	President of the Presidency Željko Komšić (Bosnia and Herzegovina) (8)	Pope Francis met Bosnia and Herzegovina’s Presidency Chairman Željko Komšić to discuss bilateral ties, equality among citizens, and regional issues, including Western Balkans stability and EU enlargement.	
February 2022
386	February 7, 2022	President Borut Pahor (Slovenia) (5)	Pope Francis met Slovenian President Borut Pahor, marking 30 years of diplomatic ties, discussing Church-state dialogue, EU enlargement, regional cooperation, and the situation in Ukraine.	
387	February 19, 2022	President Hakainde Hichilema (Zambia) (2)	Pope Francis met Zambian President Hakainde Hichilema to discuss bilateral ties, the Church’s social role, Covid-19 vaccine access, and prospects for a cooperation agreement, as well as regional issues.	
March 2022
388	March 14, 2022	Prime Minister Eduard Heger (Slovakia) (5)	Pope Francis met Slovak Prime Minister Eduard Heger to discuss strong bilateral relations, the Church’s role, and the Ukraine war’s regional impact, focusing on the humanitarian crisis and refugees.	
389	March 14, 2022	Foreign Minister Edgars Rinkēvičs (Latvia) (5)		
390	March 21, 2022	President Michel Aoun (Lebanon) (5)	Pope Francis met Lebanese President Michel Aoun to mark 75 years of diplomatic ties, discussing Lebanon’s economic crisis, refugees, reforms, and justice for victims of the 2020 Beirut port explosion.	
391	March 26, 2022	President Évariste Ndayishimiye (Burundi)	Pope Francis met Burundi’s President Évariste Ndayishimiye, highlighting good bilateral relations, the Church’s societal contributions, and discussing the country’s political, social, and regional issues.	
April 2022
392	April 1, 2022	President Andrzej Duda (Poland) (10)	Pope Francis met Polish President Andrzej Duda to discuss the Ukraine conflict, European security and peace, and the humanitarian situation of Ukrainian refugees and displaced persons.	
393	April 7, 2022	(Council of Europe) ECHR President Robert Spano (CoE/ECHR) (6)		
394	April 8, 2022	(Council of Europe) Commissioner Dunja Mijatović (CoE/CHR) (7)		
395	April 9, 2022	(Council of Europe) Secretary-General Marija Pejčinović Burić (CoE) (8)		
396	April 21, 2022	Prime Minister Viktor Orbán (Hungary) (3)		
397	April 28, 2022	President Ali Bongo (Gabon)	Pope Francis met Gabon’s President Ali Bongo Ondimba, noting 25 yrs of bilateral ties, the Church’s role in education, and discussing Gabon’s social, economic, regional, and international issues.	
May 2022
398	May 4, 2022	Prime Minister Fumio Kishida (Japan) (3)	Pope Francis met Japan’s PM Fumio Kishida, noting 80 yrs of bilateral ties, the Church’s contributions, and discussing Ukraine, peace, dialogue, and the hope for a nuclear-free world.	
399	May 6, 2022	President Ignazio Cassis (Switzerland)	Pope Francis met Swiss President Ignazio Cassis, recalling the Swiss Guard’s service, strong bilateral ties, collaboration on justice and peace, and discussing Ukraine and humanitarian aid for refugees.	
400	May 23, 2022	Prime Minister Kiril Petkov (Bulgaria) (9)		
401	May 23, 2022	(North Macedonia) Prime Minister Dimitar Kovačevski (FYR Macedonia) (10)		
402	May 30, 2022	Deputy Prime Minister and Foreign Minister Mukhtar Tileuberdi (Kazakhstan) (2)		
June 2022
403	June 6, 2022	Speaker Lindita Nikolla (Albania) (4)		
404	June 9, 2022	Prime Minister Petr Fiala (Czech Republic) (2)	Pope Francis met Czech Prime Minister Petr Fiala to discuss strong bilateral ties, the Church’s role in society, and the impact of the Ukraine war, focusing on humanitarian aid and refugees.	
405	June 10, 2022	(European Union) Commission President Ursula von der Leyen (EU) (11)	Pope Francis received EU Commission President von der Leyen. Talks focused on strong bilateral ties, ending the war in Ukraine, humanitarian and food issues, and the Conference on the Future of Europe.	
406	June 23, 2022	(Sovereign Military Order of Malta) Lieutenant of the Grand Master John T. Dunlap (Order of Malta) (8)		
407	June 23, 2022	Vice-President Raquel Peña (Dominican Republic) (2)		
408	June 24, 2022	(United Nations) President Gilbert Houngbo (UN/IFAD) (34)		
July 2022
409	July 20, 2022	Prince Albert II and Princess Charlene (Monaco) (2)		
August 2022
410	August 1, 2022	President Wiliame Katonivere (Fiji)	Pope Francis received Fiji’s President Katonivere. Talks highlighted bilateral ties, the Church’s contribution, regional issues, climate change, humanitarian concerns, and protecting our common home.	
411	August 25, 2022	President Katalin Novák (Hungary) (4)	Pope Francis received Hungary’s President Novák. Talks highlighted bilateral ties, the Church’s role, family, life, youth, Christians in the Middle East, and the war in Ukraine with a focus on peace.	
September 2022
412	September 17, 2022	President Alassane Ouattara (Ivory Coast)	Pope Francis received Cote d’Ivoire’s President Ouattara, discussing good bilateral relations, the Church’s role in education and healthcare, the country’s social situation, reconciliation, and regional security.	
413	September 28, 2022	(United Nations) Director-General António Vitorino (UN/IOM) (35)		
October 2022
414	October 10, 2022	Prime Minister Dritan Abazović (Montenegro) (4)	Pope Francis met Montenegrin Prime Minister Dritan Abazović. Talks praised strong bilateral ties, Church contributions, and urged inclusive dialogue, addressing Western Balkans and EU accession issues.	
415	October 17, 2022	Foreign Minister César Landa (Peru) (3)		
416	October 20, 2022	President Xiomara Castro (Honduras) (2)	Pope Francis met Honduran President Castro. Talks praised strong ties, a future Framework Agreement, and the Church’s role in education, healthcare, poverty relief, migrant aid, and national reconciliation.	
417	October 24, 2022	President Nicos Anastasiades (Cyprus) (3)	Pope Francis met Cypriot President Nicos Anastasiades. Talks praised strong ties, refugee support, the island’s reunification process, and regional issues, emphasizing resolution through dialogue.	
418	October 24, 2022	President Emmanuel Macron (France) (5)	Pope Francis met French President Macron. Talks focused on international issues, including Ukraine’s conflict, humanitarian concerns, and developments in the Caucasus, Middle East, and Africa.	
419	October 29, 2022	Prime Minister Xavier Bettel (Luxembourg) (5)	Pope Francis met Luxembourg’s PM Bettel. Talks praised strong ties, Church-State relations, Ukraine peace efforts, and addressed migration, refugee aid, and broader European and international issues.	
November 2022
420	November 10, 2022	King Abdullah II of Jordan (Jordan) (5)	Pope Francis met King Abdullah II of Jordan. Talks praised bilateral ties, interreligious dialogue, Church freedom, Middle East peace, Palestinian issues, refugees, and preserving Christian presence and Holy Places.	
421	November 24, 2022	(Organization of American States) Secretary-General Luis Leonardo Almagro (OAS) (4)		
December 2022
422	December 2, 2022	President Bajram Begaj (Albania) (5)	Pope Francis met Albanian President Bajram Begaj. Talks praised strong ties, the Church’s role in society, EU integration, and addressed regional and international issues, including Ukraine’s impact on the Western Balkans.	
423	December 3, 2022	President Mohamed Bazoum (Niger)	Pope Francis met Niger President Mohamed Bazoum. Talks highlighted strong ties, education, social and economic issues, and addressed security and migration challenges in West Africa and the Sahel.	
424	December 10, 2022	President Zuzana Čaputová (Slovakia) (6)	Pope Francis met Slovak President Zuzana Čaputová. Talks highlighted strong bilateral ties, the Church’s societal role, and addressed Ukraine’s war, refugee support, and related socio-economic challenges.	
425	December 17, 2022	Prime Minister Robert Golob (Slovenia) (6)	Pope Francis met Slovenian PM Robert Golob. Talks praised strong ties, the Church’s societal role, EU enlargement to the Western Balkans, and Ukraine’s conflict and regional impact.	

=== 2023 ===
#	Date	Visitor	Notes	Source
January 2023
426	January 10, 2023	Prime Minister Giorgia Meloni (Italy) (8)	Pope Francis met Italian PM Giorgia Meloni. Talks praised strong ties and addressed social issues like poverty, family, youth education, and international matters including Europe, Ukraine, and migration.	
427	January 12, 2023	(United Nations) (International Atomic Energy Agency) Director-General Rafael Grossi (UN/IAEA) (36)		
428	January 14, 2023	First Lady Verónica Alcocer (Colombia) (6)		
429	January 20, 2023	President Mario Abdo Benítez (Paraguay) (6)	Pope Francis met Paraguay’s President Abdo Benítez to reaffirm strong bilateral ties, discuss social challenges like poverty and inequality, and address climate change, the pandemic, and regional cooperation.	
430	January 21, 2023	President Guillermo Lasso (Ecuador) (5)	Pope Francis and Ecuador’s President Lasso discussed Church–State cooperation, regional issues, development, peace, protecting life and children, Indigenous rights, prison reform, and the environment.	
431	January 30, 2023	Foreign Minister Rogelio Mayta (Bolivia) (5)		
432	January 30, 2023	(United Nations) High Commissioner Filippo Grandi (UN/UNHCR) (37)		
March 2023
433	March 16, 2023	Prime Minister ad interim Najib Mikati (Lebanon) (6)	Vatican leaders met Lebanon’s PM Mikati, expressing concern over Lebanon’s crisis and urging election of a president, support for Christian presence, and stronger interfaith coexistence for regional stability.	
434	March 20, 2023	Captains Regent Maria Luisa Berti and Manuel Ciavatta (San Marino) (6)	Pope Francis met San Marino’s Captains Regent to note strong bilateral ties, discuss national issues, and address global topics including the war in Ukraine, Europe relations, migration, and multilateral cooperation.	
April 2023
435	April 3, 2023	Prime Minister Borjana Krišto (Bosnia and Herzegovina) (9)	Pope Francis met Bosnia and Herzegovina’s Borjana Krišto, noting positive ties, Church–state issues, and the need for equality and inclusive dialogue, and welcomed the country’s EU candidate status.	
436	April 27, 2023	Prime Minister Denys Shmyhal (Ukraine) (5)	Pope Francis met Ukrainian PM Shmyhal, discussing the war’s humanitarian needs, peace efforts, and issues concerning Church life and activity in Ukraine.	
May 2023
437	May 4, 2023	(United States) Speaker Kevin McCarthy (USA) (8)		
438	May 6, 2023	Vice-President Ueli Maurer (Switzerland) (7)		
439	May 11, 2023	(United Nations) (United Nations Relief and Works Agency for Palestine Refugees in the Near East) Commissioner-general Philippe Lazzarini (UN/UNRWA) (38)		
440	May 13, 2023	President Volodymyr Zelenskyy (Ukraine) (6)	Pope Francis met President Zelenskyy, focusing on the war in Ukraine, urgent humanitarian needs, ongoing peace efforts, and bilateral issues affecting the Catholic Church in the country.	
441	May 22, 2023	President Nataša Pirc Musar (Slovenia) (7)	Pope Francis met Slovenia’s President Musar, noting strong bilateral ties and the Church’s societal role, while discussing Ukraine, Western Balkans politics, and the region’s EU integration prospects.	
442	May 24, 2023	Speaker Rosen Zhelyazkov (Bulgaria) (10)		
443	May 24, 2023	Speaker Talat Xhaferi (North Macedonia) (11)		
444	May 29, 2023	President Sergio Mattarella (Italy) (9)		
June 2023
445	June 19, 2023	(Sovereign Military Order of Malta) Prince and Grand Master John T. Dunlap (Order of Malta) (9)		
446	June 20, 2023	President Miguel Díaz-Canel (Cuba)	Cuban President Miguel Díaz-Canel met Pope Francis and Vatican officials, discussing Holy See–Cuba ties, recalling John Paul II’s 1998 visit, Cuba’s situation, Church charity work, and global issues.	
447	June 21, 2023	President Luiz Inácio Lula da Silva (Brazil) (3)	Pope Francis met Brazilian President Lula da Silva, praising strong Holy See–Brazil ties and Church–State cooperation, and discussing peace, reconciliation, poverty, indigenous rights, and environmental protection.	
July 2023
448	July 22, 2023	President Nana Akufo-Addo (Ghana) (2)	Pope Francis met Ghana’s President Akufo-Addo, highlighting strong Holy See–Ghana relations, cooperation in education and healthcare, and discussing global peace and West African security.	
449	July 24, 2023	Prime Minister Robinah Nabbaja (Uganda) (2)		
450	July 24, 2023	(United Nations) (World Health Organization) Director-General Tedros Adhanom Ghebreyesus (UN/WHO) (39)		
451	July 27, 2023	President Vo Van Thuong (Vietnam) (4)	Viet Nam and the Holy See signed an agreement on a Resident Papal Representative, praising improved relations and the Catholic community’s role in supporting the nation and bilateral ties.	
August 2023
452	August 25, 2023	President Katalin Novák (Hungary) (5)	Pope Francis met Hungarian President Katalin Novák, discussing family and Christian values, the Ukraine war and humanitarian efforts, religious freedom, and the situation of persecuted Christians worldwide.	
453	August 25, 2023	Speaker Anita Among (Uganda) (3)		
September 2023
454	September 7, 2023	Director-General Jan Beagle (IDLO)		
455	September 14, 2023	King Philippe and Queen Mathilde (Belgium) (2)	Pope Francis met King Philippe and Queen Mathilde of Belgium, noting strong Holy See–Belgium ties, the Church’s role, and discussing Africa, the Ukraine war, and efforts for peace.	
October 2023
456	October 5, 2023	(United Nations) Executive Director Cindy McCain (UN/WFP) (40)		
457	October 7, 2023	Foreign Minister Francisco Bustillo (Uruguay) (3)		
458	October 14, 2023	President Dina Boluarte (Peru) (4)	Pope Francis met Peruvian President Dina Boluarte, praising strong Holy See–Peru relations and Church–State cooperation, and discussing regional issues, migration, climate change, and social peace.	
459	October 14, 2023	Prime Minister Philip Davis (The Bahamas) (2)	Pope Francis met Bahamas Prime Minister Philip Davis, praising strong bilateral ties and discussing regional issues, including climate change, migration, and shared priorities.	
460	October 16, 2023	King Hamad bin Isa Al Khalifa (Bahrain) (3)		
461	October 18, 2023	King Letsie III (Lesotho) (2)	Pope Francis met King Letsie III of Lesotho, noting strong Holy See–Lesotho relations and the Church’s role, and discussing Ukraine, the Holy Land, and Southern Africa’s political, climate, and security issues.	
462	October 19, 2023	(Republic of Ireland) President Michael D. Higgins (Ireland) (4)	Pope Francis met Irish President Michael D. Higgins, praising strong Holy See–Ireland ties and discussing global issues: food security, poverty, environment, migration, and multilateral cooperation.	
463	October 21, 2023	Presidency Member Denis Bećirović (Bosnia and Herzegovina) (10)	Pope Francis met Bosnia’s Presidency member Denis Bećirović, noting positive bilateral ties, discussing domestic peace through equality and dialogue, Ukraine, the Holy Land, EU enlargement, and Bosnia’s European path.	
November 2023
464	November 9, 2023	President Alain Berset (Switzerland) (8)	Pope Francis met Swiss President Alain Berset, praising Holy See–Switzerland ties, the Swiss Guard, and discussing Africa, Ukraine, Israel-Palestine, and global multilateralism and peace efforts.	
465	November 13, 2023	Speaker Viktorija Čmilyte-Nielsen (Lithuania) (7)		
466	November 18, 2023	President Adbul Latif Rashid (Iraq) (7)	Pope Francis met Iraqi President Abdul Latif Rashid, noting strong Holy See–Iraq ties, supporting the Catholic Church and Christians in Iraq, and discussing Israel-Palestine and global peace efforts.	
467	November 24, 2023	President Nikos Christodoulides (Cyprus) (4)	Pope Francis met Cypriot President Christodoulides, praising positive bilateral ties, discussing Church-State matters, migration, and international issues, including the Israel-Palestine conflict.	
468	November 27, 2023	President Santiago Peña (Paraguay) (7)	Pope Francis met Paraguayan President Santiago Peña, praising strong Holy See–Paraguay ties, discussing poverty reduction, environmental protection, regional issues, and promoting peace among nations.	
December 2023
469	December 14, 2023	Vice-President Francia Márquez (Colombia) (7)		
470	December 15, 2023	(United Nations) (Food and Agriculture Organization) Director-General Qu Dongyu (UN/FAO) (41)		
471	December 30, 2023	Speaker Lorenzo Fontana (Italy) (10)		

=== 2024 ===
#	Date	Visitor	Notes	Source
January 2024
472	January 19, 2024	President Kassym-Jomart Tokayev (Kazakhstan) (3)	Pope Francis met Kazakhstan President Tokayev, praising strong bilateral ties and interreligious dialogue, and discussing conflicts, humanitarian issues, and the need to promote peace and stability.	
473	January 19, 2024	President Gustavo Petro (Colombia) (8)	Pope Francis met Colombian President Petro, praising strong Holy See–Colombia relations and Church–State cooperation, and discussing social justice, reconciliation, migration, and environmental protection.	
474	January 22, 2024	President José Ramos-Horta (Timor-Leste) (2)	Pope Francis met East Timor President Ramos-Horta, praising strong bilateral ties and the Church’s role, and discussing socio-economic issues, climate change impacts, and regional affairs in Southeast Asia.	
475	January 26, 2024	(United Nations) High Commissioner Volker Türk (UN/OHCHR) (42)		
476	January 26, 2024	(United Nations) Director-General Amy Pope (UN/IOM) (43)		
477	January 27, 2024	President Faustin-Archange Touadéra (Central African Republic) (4)	Pope Francis met Central African Republic President Touadéra, praising strong ties and the Church’s role, recalling the 2015 visit, and discussing social, humanitarian, and regional issues.	
478	January 29, 2024	(Guinea-Bissau) President Umaro Sissoco Embaló (Guinea Bissau)	Pope Francis met Guinea-Bissau President Umaro Sissoco Embaló, highlighting strong bilateral ties, discussing the country’s social situation, and praising the Church’s role in education and health.	
February 2024
479	February 1, 2024	Prime Minister Patrice Trovoada (São Tomé and Príncipe)	Pope Francis met São Tomé and Príncipe PM Patrice Trovoada, praising strong bilateral ties, cooperation in education and health, and discussing socio-economic issues and African security.	
480	February 2, 2024	Deputy Prime MinisterYolanda Díaz (Spain) (6)		
481	February 12, 2024	PresidentSamia Suluhu Hassan (Tanzania)	Pope Francis met Tanzanian President Samia Suluhu Hassan, praising strong ties and the Church’s role in charity, education and health, and discussing social challenges, regional issues, and peace.	
482	February 12, 2024	PresidentJavier Milei (Argentina) (9)	Pope Francis met Argentine President Javier Milei, noting strong Holy See–Argentina ties, discussing the new government’s plans to address the economic crisis, and international conflicts and peace efforts.	
483	February 15, 2024	Prime Minister Marcel Ciolacu (Romania) (4)	Pope Francis met Romanian PM Ion-Marcel Ciolacu, praising strong Holy See–Romania ties, cooperation in education, and discussing Ukraine, Israel-Palestine, migration, refugees, and EU enlargement.	
March 2024
484	March 1, 2024	(United Nations) (Food and Agriculture Organization) Executive Council President Hans Hoogeveen (UN/FAO) (44)		
485	March 2, 2024	Chancellor Olaf Scholz (Germany) (8)	Pope Francis met German Chancellor Olaf Scholz, praising strong Holy See–Germany ties, discussing migration, and addressing Ukraine, Israel-Palestine conflicts, and efforts for peace and diplomacy.	
486	March 7, 2024	President Jakov Milatović (Montenegro) (5)	Pope Francis met Montenegrin President Jakov Milatović, noting strong Holy See–Montenegro ties, the local Church’s role, EU integration, and discussing Israel-Palestine and Ukraine conflicts.	
487	March 16, 2024	President Wavel Ramkalawan (Seychelles) (2)	Pope Francis met Seychelles President Ramkalawan, praising strong Holy See–Seychelles ties and the Church’s role, and discussing social issues, education, environment, drug prevention, and global affairs.	
488	March 21, 2024	President George Vella (Malta) (9)	Pope Francis met Maltese President Vella, praising strong bilateral ties and discussing international issues, including the Mediterranean region, Israel-Palestine and Ukraine conflicts, and migration.	
489	March 25, 2024	Foreign Minister Igli Hasani (Albania) (6)		
April 2024
490	April 4, 2024	Senate President Maulen Ashimbayev (Kazakhstan) (4)		
491	April 6, 2024	Speaker Francina Armengol (Spain) (7)		
492	April 12, 2024	(European Union) Commission Vice-President Dubravka Šuica (EU) (12)		
493	April 20, 2024	Prime Minister John Briceño (Belize)	Pope Francis met Belize PM Briceño, praising strong Holy See–Belize ties, highlighting the Church’s role in education and migrant care, and discussing socio-political issues and Christian values.	
494	April 24, 2024	Vice-President Mahamudu Bawumia (Ghana) (3)	Pope Francis met Ghana VP Bawumia, noting strong Holy See–Ghana ties, cooperation in education and health, and discussing political, socio-economic, and security issues in West Africa and the Gulf of Guinea.	
495	April 25, 2024	President Tamás Sulyok (Hungary) (6)	Pope Francis met Hungarian President Sulyok, praising strong Holy See–Hungary ties, the Church’s role, and discussing families, youth, vulnerable Christians, and Ukraine’s humanitarian crisis and peace efforts.	
496	April 26, 2024	President Emomali Rahmon (Tajikistan)	Pope Francis met Tajikistan President Emomali Rahmon, then Cardinal Parolin. Talks noted good relations, Tajikistan’s situation, and stressed dialogue and mutual understanding for peace.	
May 2024
497	May 2, 2024	King Abdullah II of Jordan (Jordan) (6)		
498	May 4, 2024	President Viola Amherd (Switzerland) (9)	Pope Francis met Swiss President Viola Amherd, then Cardinal Parolin. Talks praised strong relations, Swiss Guard renovation, and focused on peace efforts in Ukraine and Israel–Palestine.	
499	May 6, 2024	President Bajram Begaj (Albania) (7)	Pope Francis met Albanian President Bajram Begaj, then Cardinal Parolin. Talks praised good relations, noted Church–State issues, Albania’s EU path, and regional and global conflicts.	
500	May 13, 2024	President Daniel Noboa (Ecuador) (6)	Pope Francis met Ecuador President Daniel Noboa, then Archbishop Gallagher. Talks highlighted strong ties, Church–State cooperation, and discussed youth jobs, security and migration.	
501	May 16, 2024	President Edgars Rinkēvičs (Latvia) (6)	Pope Francis met Latvian President Edgars Rinkēvičs, then Cardinal Parolin. Talks praised good relations, Christian faith’s role, peace efforts for Ukraine, and challenges of AI.	
502	May 23, 2024	President Rumen Radev (Bulgaria) (11)		
503	May 23, 2024	President Gordana Siljanovska- Davkova (North Macedonia) (12)		
504	May 27, 2024	President Luis Abinader (Dominican Republic) (3)	Pope Francis met Dominican President Luis Abinader, then Cardinal Parolin. Talks praised strong ties, Church’s role in education and charity, and discussed migration and regional issues.	
June 2024
505	June 1, 2024	President Zuzana Čaputová (Slovakia) (7)	Pope Francis met Slovak President Zuzana Čaputová, then Cardinal Parolin. Talks covered national unity after the PM attack, elections, leadership change, and the war in Ukraine.	
506	June 5, 2024	Senate President Iván Name (Colombia) (9)		
507	June 14, 2024	(Cape Verde) President José Maria Neves (Cabo Verde) (4)	Pope Francis met Cabo Verde President Neves, then Cardinal Parolin. Talks highlighted good relations, social and economic issues, the 2014 agreement, and global security, migration and trafficking.	
508	June 27, 2024	(Sovereign Military Order of Malta) Prince and Grand Master John T. Dunlap (Order of Malta) (10)		
August 2024
509	August 19, 2024	President Lazarus Chakwera (Malawi)	Pope Francis met Malawi President Lazarus Chakwera, then Cardinal Parolin. Talks highlighted strong ties, Church cooperation in health and education, and dialogue for regional and global peace.	
510	August 24, 2024	Speaker Anita Among (Uganda) (4)		
511	August 29, 2024	(Organization of American States) Deputy Secretary-General Nestor Mendez (OAS) (5)		
October 2024
512	October 4, 2024	President Sadyr Zhaparov (Kyrgyzstan)	Pope Francis met Kyrgyzstan’s President Zhaparov. Talks highlighted strong relations, cooperation in health, education and culture, local Church life, and global conflicts, stressing peace.	
513	October 11, 2024	Prime Minister Pedro Sánchez (Spain) (8)	Pope Francis met Spanish PM Sánchez. Talks covered Church–state dialogue, bilateral relations, global conflicts, peace efforts, and the migration crisis, especially in the Mediterranean and Canary Islands.	
514	October 11, 2024	President Volodymyr Zelenskyy (Ukraine) (7)	Pope Francis met Ukraine’s President Zelenskyy. Talks focused on the war, humanitarian situation, paths to a just peace, and aspects of Ukraine’s religious life.	
515	October 14, 2024	Vice-President Victoria Villarruel (Argentina) (10)		
516	October 18, 2024	President Joseph Boakai (Liberia) (2)	Pope Francis met Liberia’s President Boakai. Talks highlighted strong relations, Church cooperation in education and healthcare, Liberia’s social issues, and regional affairs including migration.	
517	October 18, 2024	King Mswati III (Eswatini)		
518	October 25, 2024	(European Union) Parliament President Roberta Metsola (EU) (13)		
519	October 28, 2024	Speaker Elisa Spiropali (Albania) (8)		

=== 2025 ===
#	Date	Visitor	Notes	Source
January 2025
520	January 16, 2025	(United Nations) President Alvaro Lario (UN/IFAD) (45)		
521	January 24, 2025	President Myriam Spiteri Debono (Malta) (10)	Pope Francis met Malta’s President Myriam Spiteri Debono. Talks praised strong Holy See–Malta ties and discussed cooperation, Mediterranean issues, Israel–Palestine, Ukraine and migration.	
February 2025
522	February 10, 2025	(European Union) Commission Vice-President and High Representative Kaja Kallas (EU) (14)		
523	February 12, 2025	First Lady Rosângela Lula da Silva (Brazil) (4)		
524	February 14, 2025	Prime Minister Robert Fico (Slovakia) (8)	Pope Francis met Slovak PM Fico. Talks affirmed strong bilateral ties, social cohesion, family and education, and addressed Ukraine, peace prospects, Israel–Palestine and Gaza’s humanitarian crisis.	
April 2025
525	April 19, 2025	(United States) Vice-President JD Vance (USA) (9)	VP JD Vance met Vatican officials. Talks praised strong Holy See–U.S. ties, religious freedom, global conflicts, humanitarian issues, and cooperation with the U.S. Church.	

== See also ==
- List of foreign visits to Pope Leo XIV
- Foreign relations of the Holy See
- Section for Relations with States
- Index of Vatican City-related articles
- Legal status of the Holy See
- Relations between the Catholic Church and the state
- Catholic Church and politics
