= List of diplomatic visits to the Holy See under Pope Leo XIV =

List of official international visits to Pope Leo XIV

This is the list of visits by representatives of states and international organizations to the Holy See during the pontificate of Pope Leo XIV, which started with his acceptance of the election on May 8, 2025.

The list includes visits by heads of states or government and heads of other sovereign entities under international law (Sovereign Military Order of Malta), as well as heads of international organizations, ministers, and their representatives.

On 9 January 2026 Leo XIV spoke for the first time to an assembly of all the diplomats accredited at the Holy See.

== Visiting officials ==
=== 2025 ===
#	Date	Visitor	Notes	Source
May 2025
1	May 18, 2025	President Dina Boluarte (Peru)	Attending Papal inauguration of Pope Leo XIV	
2	May 18, 2025	President Volodymyr Zelenskyy (Ukraine)	Attending Papal inauguration of Pope Leo XIV	
3	May 19, 2025	President Gustavo Petro (Colombia)	Attending Papal inauguration of Pope Leo XIV; They discussed strong Holy See–Colombia relations and the Church's role in supporting peace and reconciliation. Talks with Archbishop Gallagher also addressed Colombia's socio-political situation, including security, migration, and climate change challenges.	
4	May 19, 2025	Vice-President JD Vance (United States)	Attending Papal inauguration of Pope Leo XIV; They discussed Church-State ties, religious freedom, and global issues. Talks with Archbishop Gallagher emphasized strong bilateral relations and the need to uphold humanitarian and international law in conflict zones, while encouraging peaceful, negotiated solutions.	
5	May 19, 2025	Prime Minister Anthony Albanese (Australia)	Attending Papal inauguration of Pope Leo XIV; They discussed strong Holy See–Australia ties. Talks with Archbishop Gallagher highlighted the Church's societal role, especially in education, and addressed shared concerns like environmental protection, human development, and religious freedom.	
6	May 19, 2025	(Georgia (country)) President Mikheil Kavelashvili (Georgia)	Attending Papal inauguration of Pope Leo XIV	
7	May 19, 2025	Foreign Minister Gerardo Werthein (Argentina)		
8	May 23, 2025	Prime Minister Rosen Zhelyazkov (Bulgaria)		
9	May 26, 2025	President Gordana Siljanovska-Davkova (North Macedonia)		
10	May 26, 2025	Prime Minister Abiy Ahmed (Ethiopia)		
June 2025
11	June 6, 2025	President Sergio Mattarella (Italy)	Pope Leo XIV met Italian President Mattarella to discuss strong bilateral ties, global conflicts in Ukraine and the Middle East, and the Church's role in Italian social life.	
12	June 6, 2025	(European Union) EUCO President António Costa (EU/EC)	Pope Leo XIV met EU Council President Costa to discuss strong ties, global hunger relief, development aid, and the ongoing conflicts in Ukraine and Gaza.	
13	June 7, 2025	President Javier Milei (Argentina) (2)	They discussed strong bilateral ties, poverty, social cohesion, and global conflicts, stressing the need for peace efforts.	
14	June 11, 2025	Secretary-General António Guterres (United Nations)	Pope Leo XIV met UN Secretary-General Guterres to discuss peace, global crises, upcoming UN summits, and conflict zones, reaffirming the Holy See's support for the UN's peace efforts.	
15	June 13, 2025	President Joseph Aoun (Lebanon)	Pope Leo XIV met with Lebanese President Aoun to discuss strong bilateral ties, Church roles, Lebanon's reform hopes, interfaith harmony, and peace in the Middle East.	
16	June 17, 2025	Secretary-General Alain Berset (Council of Europe)		
17	June 23, 2025	Prince and Grand Master John T. Dunlap (Sovereign Military Order of Malta)	Pope Leo XIV met Prince and Grand Master and thanked the Order of Malta for showing God's love, urging deeper prayer, spiritual renewal, strong formation, and service to the poor rooted in faith, not just philanthropy.	
18	June 28, 2025	President Teodoro Obiang Nguema Mbasogo (Equatorial Guinea)	Pope Leo XIV met President Obiang of Equatorial Guinea. Talks focused on Church contributions, bilateral ties, and regional security issues in Central and Western Africa.	
19	June 30, 2025	President Carlos Vila Nova (São Tomé and Príncipe)	Pope Leo XIV met President Vila Nova of São Tomé and Príncipe to discuss Church collaboration in healthcare, education, youth formation, and regional dialogue and cooperation.	
20	June 30, 2025	Vice President Vo Thi Anh Xuan (Vietnam)	Pope Leo XIV met Vietnam's Vice-President Vo Thi An Xuan to discuss growing Holy See–Vietnam ties, Church contributions to society, and regional and international issues.	
July 2025
21	July 2, 2025	Prime Minister Giorgia Meloni (Italy) (2)	Pope Leo XIV met Italian PM Giorgia Meloni to discuss Holy See–Italy ties, joint efforts for peace in Ukraine and the Middle East, aid in Gaza, and key issues in Church–state relations.	
22	July 2, 2025	First Lady Emine Erdoğan (Turkey)	Turkey's First Lady met Pope Leo XIV, urging Christian support for a Gaza ceasefire. They discussed aid, climate, racism, and a possible papal visit to Turkey in November.	
23	July 3, 2025	President Andrzej Duda (Poland)	Pope Leo XIV met Polish President Duda to discuss strong bilateral relations, Poland's political situation, and international concerns, with emphasis on the war in Ukraine.	
24	July 4, 2025	Prime Minister Milojko Spajić (Montenegro)	Pope Leo XIV received Montenegrin PM Milojko Spajić at the Vatican. Talks with Cardinal Parolin and Archbishop Gallagher highlighted strong bilateral ties, Church-State matters, EU enlargement, and Ukraine.	
25	July 9, 2025	President Volodymyr Zelenskyy (Ukraine) (2)	Pope Leo XIV met President Zelenskyy to discuss peace in Ukraine, stressing dialogue, aid for victims, prisoner release, and Vatican-hosted talks with both Ukraine and Russia.	
26	July 24, 2025	President Abdelmadjid Tebboune (Algeria)	Pope Leo XIV met with Algerian President Tebboune. They discussed good relations, the Church in Algeria, geopolitics, interreligious dialogue, and promoting peace and fraternity worldwide.	
August 2025
27	August 1, 2025	(United Nations) (Food and Agriculture Organization) Director-General Qu Dongyu (UN/FAO)		
28	August 11, 2025	UNGA President Philemon Yang (United Nations)		
29	August 22, 2025	President Wavel Ramkalawan (Seychelles)	Pope Leo XIV met Seychelles' President Ramkalawan to discuss strong Holy See ties, youth-focused cooperation in education, health, and the environment, and the value of dialogue and global cooperation.	
30	August 25, 2025	Deputy Prime Minister and Foreign Minister Antonio Tajani (Italy) (3)		
31	August 29, 2025	Deputy Prime Minister and Minister Matteo Salvini (Italy) (4)		
32	August 30, 2025	President Emmerson Mnangagwa (Zimbabwe)	Pope Leo XIV met Zimbabwe's President Mnangagwa to discuss Church-state ties, socio-economic issues, and cooperation on education, health, and the environment, stressing dialogue and multilateralism.	
September 2025
33	September 4, 2025	President Isaac Herzog (Israel)	Pope Leo XIV received Israeli President Herzog, followed by a meeting with Cardinal Parolin and Archbishop Gallagher. Discussions focused on the Middle East, especially the crisis in Gaza. Both sides emphasized the urgent need for a permanent ceasefire, the release of hostages, humanitarian aid access, respect for humanitarian law, and a two-state solution for lasting peace. They also addressed the situation in the West Bank and Jerusalem.	
34	September 5, 2025	(United Nations) (International Atomic Energy Agency) Director-General Rafael Grossi (UN/IAEA)		
35	September 5, 2025	President Karol Nawrocki (Poland) (2)	Pope Leo XIV met President Nawrocki to discuss Poland's internal challenges, shared values, and international issues, focusing on the war in Ukraine and Europe's security.	
36	September 12, 2025	Prime Minister Roosevelt Skerrit (Dominica)	Pope Leo XIV met Dominica's PM Roosevelt Skerrit at the Vatican. Talks with Cardinal Parolin focused on Church aid, education, climate change, and strengthening ties for the Dominican people.	
37	September 12, 2025	President Maia Sandu (Moldova)		
38	September 18 2025	(United Nations) High Commissioner Filippo Grandi (UN/UNCHR)		
39	September 19, 2025	President Xiomara Castro (Honduras)	Honduras President Xiomara Castro met Pope Leo XIV and Cardinal Parolin at the Vatican, discussing Church-State ties, social issues, education, migrants, and regional sociopolitical matters.	
40	September 22, 2025	President Frank-Walter Steinmeier (Germany)		
41	September 29, 2025	Prime Minister Prince Salman bin Hamad Al Khalifa (Bahrain)	Pope Leo XIV met Bahrain's Crown Prince Salman. Talks with Cardinal Parolin highlighted strong ties, interfaith dialogue, and calls for peace in the Middle East.	
42	September 29, 2025	(Guinea-Bissau) President Umaro Sissoco Embaló (Guinea Bissau)	Pope Leo XIV met Guinea-Bissau's President Embaló. Talks with Cardinal Parolin stressed good ties, Church's role in education/health, and global/social issues.	
October 2025
43	October 2, 2025	(United Nations) Director General Amy Pope (UN/IOM)		
44	October 3, 2025	President Karin Keller-Sutter (Switzerland)	On October 3, Pope Leo XIV met with Swiss President Karin Keller-Sutter. Talks highlighted strong bilateral ties and shared hopes for peace in Ukraine and Gaza.	
45	October 6, 2025	President Gitanas Nausėda (Lithuania)	Pope Leo XIV met Lithuanian President Gitanas Nausėda. Talks praised strong ties and urged diplomatic efforts to end the Ukraine war and prevent further conflict escalation.	
46	October 6, 2025	(Organization of American States) Secretary-General Albert Ramdin (OAS)		
47	October 6, 2025	(United Nations) Director-General Catherine Russell (UN/UNICEF)		
48	October 11, 2025	President Bernardo Arévalo (Guatemala)	Pope Leo XIV met Guatemalan President Bernardo Arévalo to discuss strengthening ties, social issues, poverty, corruption, crime, migration, and regional conflicts.	
49	October 13, 2025	President Gabriel Boric (Chile)		
50	October 14, 2025	King Abdullah II (Jordan)		
51	October 16, 2025	President Mahamat Déby (Chad)	Pope Leo XIV met Chad's President Mahamat Idriss Déby Itno to discuss strong bilateral ties, interreligious coexistence, peace promotion, regional issues, and national challenges.	
52	October 17, 2025	President Yamandú Orsi (Uruguay)	Pope Leo XIV met Uruguay's President Yamandú Orsi to discuss strengthening bilateral relations, emphasizing the Church's role in education and the fight against poverty, as well as ethical and demographic issues.	
53	October 17, 2025	King Letsie III (Lesotho)		
54	October 17, 2025	Vice-President Mehriban Aliyeva (Azerbaijan)	Pope Leo XIV met Azerbaijan's First Vice President Mehriban Aliyeva to discuss strengthened bilateral ties, cultural cooperation, the Church's role, and the need for lasting peace in the South Caucasus.	
55	October 20, 2025	Prime Minister Nikol Pashinyan (Armenia)	Pope Leo XIV met Armenian PM Nikol Pashinyan, reaffirming good Holy See–Armenia ties and the nation's Christian heritage. Talks also addressed Church life and the pursuit of lasting peace in the South Caucasus.	
56	October 23, 2025	King Charles III and Queen Camilla (United Kingdom)	Pope Leo XIV, King Charles III, and Queen Camilla held a historic Anglican-Catholic prayer in the Sistine Chapel, promoting Christian unity and care for creation—the first in 500 years.	
57	October 24, 2025	Senate President Gérard Larcher (France)		
58	October 25, 2025	Prime Minister Nawaf Salam (Lebanon) (2)	Pope Leo XIV met Lebanese PM Nawaf Salam and Deputy PM Tarek Mitri, noting good bilateral relations and the upcoming papal visit to Lebanon. Talks focused on national reforms and peace in the Levant.	
59	October 27, 2025	Prime Minister Viktor Orbán (Hungary)	Pope Leo XIV met Hungarian PM Viktor Orbán. Talks highlighted strong bilateral relations, the Church's social role, family and youth issues, and addressed Europe's challenges, Ukraine, and the Middle East.	
60	October 27, 2025	King Philippe and Queen Mathilde (Belgium)		
61	October 30, 2025	President Brice Oligui Nguema (Gabon)	Pope Leo XIV received Gabon's President Brice Oligui Nguema. Talks with Cardinal Parolin highlighted good relations, cooperation in health, education, youth training, and dialogue for peace and reconciliation.	
62	October 30, 2025	President Naiqama Lalabalavu (Fiji)	Pope Leo XIV met Fiji's President Ratu Naiqama Lalabalavu at the Vatican. Talks with Cardinal Parolin praised bilateral ties, Church efforts, and addressed environment and transnational crime issues.	
63	October 31, 2025	President Zoran Milanović (Croatia)	Pope Leo XIV met Croatian President Zoran Milanović. Talks with Cardinal Parolin highlighted good bilateral relations and discussed international issues, especially regional cooperation. Milanović gifted pope with reprint of the 1483 Missale Romanum Glagolitice.	
November 2025
64	November 6, 2025	President Mahmoud Abbas (Palestine)	Pope Leo XIV met Palestinian President Mahmoud Abbas on the 10th anniversary of the Holy See–Palestine Agreement. Talks urged aid for Gaza civilians and a two-State solution to end the conflict.	
65	November 8, 2025	President Cyril Ramaphosa (South Africa)	Pope Leo XIV met South African President Cyril Ramaphosa. Talks praised the Church's role in education, healthcare, and its efforts to promote dialogue and reconciliation in South African society.	
66	November 21, 2025	President José Ramos-Horta (Timor-Leste)	Pope Leo XIV met Timor-Leste's President Ramos-Horta. They noted strong ties, the Church's social role, national issues, regional matters, and Timor-Leste's recent ASEAN accession.	
67	November 24, 2025	(Georgia (country)) Prime Minister Irakli Kobakhidze (Georgia) (2)	Pope Leo XIV met Georgian PM Kobakhidze. They affirmed strong Holy See–Georgia ties, discussed the Church's situation, and reviewed bilateral issues, regional developments, and national challenges.	
68	November 24, 2025	Prime Minister Evika Siliņa (Latvia)	Pope Leo XIV met Latvian PM Evika Siliņa. They welcomed strong Holy See–Latvia relations, the Church's positive role, and discussed regional issues, especially efforts for peace in Ukraine.	
December 2025
69	December 4, 2025	President Peter Pellegrini (Slovakia)	Pope Leo XIV met Slovak President Pellegrini, noting strong ties and the Basic Agreement's 25th year, reaffirming social cohesion and family, and discussing Ukraine, European security, and the Middle East.	
70	December 4, 2025	President Ukhnaagiin Khürelsükh (Mongolia)	Pope Leo XIV met Mongolia's President Khürelsükh, followed by talks with Cardinal Parolin. They highlighted strong Holy See–Mongolia relations, plans for deeper cooperation—especially culturally—and welcomed the Catholic Church's contributions to education and healthcare.	
71	December 5, 2025	Prime Minister Andrej Plenković (Croatia) (2)	Pope Leo XIV met Croatian PM Andrej Plenković after his talks with Cardinal Parolin. They welcomed strong Church–state relations, aimed to deepen cooperation, and discussed Western Balkans issues and the war in Ukraine.	
72	December 9, 2025	President Volodymyr Zelenskyy (Ukraine) (3)	Pope Leo XIV met Ukraine's President Zelenskyy at Castel Gandolfo, urging continued dialogue, a just peace, and addressing POW issues and the return of displaced Ukrainian children.	
73	December 11, 2025	Senate President Maulen Ashimbayev (Kazakhstan)		
74	December 12, 2025	President Vjosa Osmani (Kosovo)		
75	December 13, 2025	Director-General Jan Beagle (IDLO)		
76	December 15, 2025	Prime Minister Robert Abela (Malta)	Pope Leo XIV met Malta PM Robert Abela, then Cardinal Parolin. Talks highlighted strong Church–State ties, cooperation on migration, and views on Europe, Ukraine and the Middle East.	
77	December 19, 2025	Speaker Lorenzo Fontana (Italy) (5)		

=== 2026 ===
#	Date	Visitor	Notes	Source
January 2026
78	January 10, 2026	(United Nations) Executive Director Cindy McCain (UN/WFP)		
79	January 12, 2026	Captains Regent Matteo Rossi and Lorenzo Bugli (San Marino)	Pope Leo XIV met San Marino's Captains Regent at the Vatican. Talks highlighted strong bilateral ties, the Church's role, and global crises, including Ukraine, diplomacy, and interreligious peace.	
80	January 12, 2026	(United Nations) Commissioner General Philippe Lazzarini (UN/UNRWA)		
81	January 17, 2026	(United Nations) Managing Director Kristalina Georgieva (UN/IMF)		
82	January 17, 2026	Prince Albert II (Monaco)	Pope Leo XIV received Prince Albert II of Monaco. Talks highlighted strong relations, the Church's role, environment, humanitarian aid, human dignity, and peace, especially in the Middle East and Africa.	
83	January 19, 2026	President Petr Pavel (Czech Republic)		
84	January 23, 2026	Grand Duke Guillaume V, Grand Duchess Stéphanie, Prince Charles, and Prince François (Luxembourg)	Pope Leo XIV met Luxembourg's Grand Duke Guillaume V and Grand Duchess Stéphanie. Talks highlighted strong ties, Church–State relations, social issues, youth education and Europe.	
85	January 26, 2026	(United Nations) High Commissioner Barham Salih (UN/UNCHR) (2)		
86	January 28,2026	Assistant Secretary-General Luis G. Franceschi (Commonwealth of Nations)		
87	January 28,2026	Foreign Affairs Minister Mahmoud Thabit Kombo (Tanzania)		
88	January 29, 2026	(European Union) EP President Roberta Metsola (EU/EP)		
February 2026
89	February 2, 2026	(United Nations) Director-General Gilbert Houngbo (UN/ILO)		
90	February 2, 2026	President Marcelo Rebelo de Sousa (Portugal)	The Pope and President de Sousa expressed mutual appreciation for the good relations between the state and the local church. Talks turned to the aftermath of Storm Kristin and the national and international socio-political situation, especially in Portuguese-speaking countries, noting the importance of constant commitment to supporting peace in the world.	
91	February 5, 2026	Prime Minister Edi Rama (Albania)	The pope and Prime Minister Rama highlighted good state-church relations and focused on regional questions such as the situation in the western Balkans and Albania's progress towards EU integration.	
92	February 9, 2026	(United Nations) Director-General Tedros Adhanom Ghebreyesus (World Health Organization)		
93	February 14, 2026	Prime Minister Ulisses Correia e Silva (Cape Verde)		
94	February 21, 2026	President Tamás Sulyok (Hungary) (2)	The pope and President Sulyok appreciated the contribution of the church to the social life of Hungary. Talks turned to the role of family and the protection of vulnerable Christian communities world-wide. They also discussed current international affairs, especially ongoing conflicts, and expressed hope for peace efforts.	
95	February 28, 2026	Foreign Affairs Minister Bruno Rodríguez Parrilla (Cuba)		
March 2026
96	March 2, 2026	President Myriam Spiteri Debono (Malta) (2)	The pope and President Debono discussed the current international situation, especially the Middle East and Ukraine. They also discussed migration and the demographic situation.	
97	March 5, 2026	President Alexander Van der Bellen (Austria)	The pope and President Van der Bellen appreciated the church's positive contribution to the common good of society. They discussed migration and inter-religious relations before moving on to international issues such as situations of conflict, expressing hope for peaceful solutions from the international community.	
98	March 5, 2026	(United Nations) President Ajay Banga (UN/WBG)		
99	March 5, 2026	President Tharman Shanmugaratnam (Singapore)	The pope and President Shanmugaratnam appreciated the harmonious co-existence of the various cultures and religions in the country as well as the church's contribution to the common good. They discussed the international and regional situation as well as the importance of supporting and renewing the existing mechanisms of the multilateral system.	
100	March 5, 2026	Governor General Mary Simon (Canada)	The pope and Governor General Simon expressed satisfaction for the fruits of the path of mutual understanding begun by Pope Francis. They discussed topics of common interest at the regional and international levels, especially to the commitment to peace among peoples.	
101	March 7, 2026	Prime Minister Inga Ruginienė (Lithuania) (2)	The pope and Prime Minister Ruginienė noted the positive contribution of the Catholic Church in promoting human dignity and the common good of society. They discussed international issues such as the conflicts in Ukraine and the Middle East, expressing hope in efforts to seek diplomatic solutions to end war.	
102	March 9, 2026	Members of the Presidency Željko Komšić, Denis Bećirović, and Željka Cvijanović (Bosnia and Herzegovina)	The pope and the members of the presidency focused on the need for inclusive and constructive dialogue in order to ensure the stability of the country and the juridical and social equality of all its constituent peoples. They also discussed several regional and international matters, including peace and security in the Western Balkans and the repercussions of the ongoing conflicts in Ukraine and the Middle East.	
103	March 12, 2026	(United Nations) Secretary-General Doreen Bogdan-Martin (UN/ITU)		
104	March 20, 2026	King Felipe VI and Queen Letizia (Spain)	The pope and their majesties looked forward to the upcoming Apostolic Journey, referencing the situation in the country and the Church's mission in society. They also discussed topics of a regional and international nature, highlighting the importance of constant commitment in support of peace and the reinforcement of the principles and values that underpin international coexistence.	
105	March 26, 2026	Chairwoman of the Council of Ministers Borjana Krišto (Bosnia and Herzegovina) (2)	Mutual gratitude for good bilateral relations and the contribution of the local Church to society was emphasized. The situation of the Catholic community in Bosnia and Herzegovina was discussed, as well as some open questions in the relations between the Church and the state. Opinions were also exchanged on the expansion of the European Union to the countries of southeastern Europe.	
April 2026
106	April 10, 2026	Prince and Grand Master John T. Dunlap (Sovereign Military Order of Malta) (2)		
107	April 10, 2026	President Emmanuel Macron (France) (2)		
May 2026
108	May 4, 2026	President Halla Tómasdóttir (Iceland)	Appreciation for good bilateral relations was emphasized, and the positive contribution of the local church to promoting the common good of society and particularly of young people. The conversation also focused on regional and international issues, especially situations of conflict, on the need for dialogue, and on prospects for peace.	
109	May 4, 2026	Governor Carlo Monticelli (Council of Europe Development Bank)		
110	May 6, 2026	President Guy Parmelin (Switzerland) (2)	Conversation highlighted bilateral relations and the service of the Pontifical Swiss Guard.	
111	May 7, 2026	Prime Minister Donald Tusk (Poland) (3)	PM Tusk expressed appreciate for good bilateral relations with the Holy See. They also discussed the social and economic condition of Poland, and the relations between the local Church and the state, especially in regard to education and ethical issues.	
112	May 7, 2026	Secretary of State Marco Rubio (United States) (2)		
113	May 9, 2026	Prime Minister Alix Didier Fils-Aimé (Haiti)	Discussion about bilateral relations and mentions of necessary international aid for the Haitian crisis.	
114	May 11, 2026	Prime Minister Kamil Idris (Sudan)	Discussion about the Sudanese civil war, the related humanitarian crisis, and the immediate necessity of a ceasefire, delivery of aid, and commencement of dialogue involving all parties.	
115	May 22, 2026	(Republic of Ireland) Prime Minister Micheál Martin (Ireland)		
116	May 25, 2026	President Bajram Begaj (Albania) (2)	Discussion about regional development in the western Balkans, with focus on Albania's accession to the European Union,	
117	May 27, 2026	Prime Minister Pedro Sánchez (Spain) (2)	Visit served as prelude to Pope Leo's upcoming visit to Spain in June.	
June 2026
118	June 5, 2026	Director-General Khaled El-Enany (UNESCO)	Prelude to Pope Leo's upcoming visit to France, where he will visit the UNESCO headquarters.	
119	June 15, 2026	President Lee Jae Myung (South Korea)	Pope Leo XIV met S. Korean President Lee Jae-myung. Talks highlighted strong Holy See–Korea ties, the Church's social contributions, World Youth Day prep, and global issues.	
120	June 18, 2026	President José María Balcázar (Peru) (2)	Discussion about mutual interests, including illegal mining.	
121	June 19, 2026	President Ilan Goldfajn (IADB)		
July 2026
122	July 2, 2026	President Gustavo Petro (Colombia) (2)	Pope Leo XIV met Colombian President Gustavo Petro. Talks highlighted strong Church-State ties in promoting peace, alongside regional issues, organized crime, and climate change.	
August 2026
123	August 20, 2026	President Joseph Aoun (Lebanon) (3)	Pope Leo XIV met Lebanese President Joseph Aoun at the Vatican. They discussed the US-Israel-Lebanon peace framework, with the Holy See backing border stability while noting implementation concerns.	
September 2026
124	September 4, 2026	President Edgars Rinkēvičs (Latvia) (2)	Pope Leo XIV met Latvian President Edgars Rinkēvičs at the Vatican. They praised strong bilateral relations and urged greater international effort toward peaceful solutions to the conflict in Ukraine.	
125	September 24, 2026	(Hungary) Prime Minister Péter Magyar (3)	Educational sector developments, protection of vulnerable Christian communities globally, and promoting international peace regarding conflicts in Ukraine and the Middle East.	
126	September 24, 2026	(Portugal) President António José Seguro (2)	Socioeconomic developments, promoting the common good, global conflicts, migration, multilateralism, international law, and supporting peace.	
127	October 1, 2026	(Central African Republic) President Faustin-Archange Touadéra	Relations with the Holy See	
128	October 5, 2026	(Slovenia) Prime Minister Janez Janša	Bilateral relations and intention to further develop cooperation in mutual interest areas; also the cntribution of the Catholic Church to Slovenian society.	
129	October 8, 2026	(Sierra Leone) President Julius Maada Bio		
130	October 15, 2026	(Dominican Republic) President Luis Abinader		
131	October 26, 2026	(Slovenia) President Nataša Pirc Musar (2)		
132	October 29, 2026	(Costa Rica) President Laura Fernández		
133	November 4, 2026	(Chile) President José Antonio Kast (2)		

== Statistics ==
Number of entities	94	(including UN specialized agencies and related organizations)

=== Number of visits per entity ===
Number	Entity
16	(United Nations) UN (UNSG, UNGA President, UNCHR (2), FAO, IAEA, ILO, IMF, ITU, IOM, UNICEF, UNRWA, WBC, WFP, WHO, UNESCO)
5	Italy
3	Hungary, Lebanon, Poland, Ukraine
2	Albania, Argentina, Bosnia and Herzegovina, Chile, Colombia, Croatia, France, (Georgia (country)) Georgia, Latvia, Lithuania, Malta, (Sovereign Military Order of Malta) Order of Malta, Peru, Portugal, Slovenia, Spain, Switzerland, (United States) USA, (European Union) EU (EC, EP), (Council of Europe) CoE
1	Algeria, Armenia, Australia, Austria, Azerbaijan, Bahrain, Belgium, Bulgaria, Canada, Cape Verde, Central African Republic, Chad, Costa Rica, Cuba, Czech Republic, Dominica, Dominican Republic, Equatorial Guinea, Ethiopia, Fiji, Gabon, Germany, Guatemala, (Guinea-Bissau) Guinea Bissau, Haiti, Honduras, Hungary, Iceland, (Republic of Ireland) Ireland, Israel, Jordan, Kazakhstan, Kosovo, Lesotho, Luxembourg, Moldova, Monaco, Mongolia, Montenegro, North Macedonia, Palestine, San Marino, São Tomé and Príncipe, Seychelles, Sierra Leone, Singapore, Slovakia, South Africa, South Korea, Sudan Tanzania, Timor-Leste, Turkey, United Kingdom, Uruguay, Vietnam, Zimbabwe; (Commonwealth of Nations) Commonwealth, IADB, IDLO, (Organization of American States) OAS

=== Visits per regions ===
Visits per regions according to the United Nations geoscheme.

Region	Number	Entity
Europe	55	Albania (2), Austria, Belgium, Bosnia and Herzegovina (2), Bulgaria, Croatia (2), Czech Republic, Italy (5), France (2), Germany, Hungary (3), Iceland, (Republic of Ireland) Ireland, Kosovo, Latvia (2), Lithuania (2), Luxembourg, Malta (2), Moldova, Monaco, Montenegro, North Macedonia, Poland (3), Portugal (2), San Marino, Slovakia, Slovenia (2), Spain (2), Switzerland (2), Ukraine (3), United Kingdom, (Sovereign Military Order of Malta) Order of Malta (2), (Council of Europe) CoE (2), (European Union) EU (EC, EP) (2)
Asia	18	Armenia, Azerbaijan, Bahrain, (Georgia (country)) Georgia (2), Israel, Jordan, Lebanon (3), Kazakhstan, Mongolia, Palestine, Singapore, South Korea, Timor-Leste, Turkey, Vietnam
Americas	20	Argentina (2), Canada, Chile (2), Colombia (2), Costa Rica, Cuba, Dominica, Dominican Republic, Guatemala, Haiti, Honduras, Peru (2), (United States) USA (2), Uruguay, IADB, (Organization of American States) OAS
Africa	16	Algeria, Cape Verde, Central African Republic, Chad, Equatorial Guinea, Gabon, (Guinea-Bissau) Guinea Bissau, Ethiopia, Lesotho, São Tomé and Príncipe, Seychelles, Sierra Leone, South Africa, Sudan, Tanzania, Zimbabwe
Oceania	2	Australia, Fiji
Global	18	(United Nations) UN (UNSG, UNGA President, UNCHR (2), FAO, IAEA, ILO, IMF, IOM, ITU, UNICEF, UNRWA, WBC, WFP, WHO, UNESCO) (13); (Commonwealth of Nations) Commonwealth, IDLO

== See also ==
- List of foreign visits to Pope Francis
- Foreign relations of the Holy See
- Section for Relations with States
- Index of Vatican City-related articles
- Legal status of the Holy See
- Relations between the Catholic Church and the state
- Catholic Church and politics
