= 2004 in Europe =

This is a list of 2004 events that occurred in Europe.

== Incumbents ==
- Albania
  - President – Alfred Moisiu, President of Albania (2002–2007)
  - Prime Minister – Fatos Nano, Prime Minister of Albania (2002–2005)
- Andorra
  - Monarchs –
    - French Co-Prince – Jacques Chirac, French Co-prince of Andorra (1995–2007)
      - Co-Prince's Representative – Philippe Massoni (2002–2007)
    - Episcopal Co-Prince – Joan Enric Vives Sicília, Episcopal Co-prince of Andorra (2003–present)
      - Co-Prince's Representative – Nemesi Marqués Oste (1993–2012)
  - Prime Minister – Marc Forné Molné, Head of Government of Andorra (1994–2005)
- Armenia
  - President – Robert Kocharyan, President of Armenia (1998–2008)
  - Prime Minister – Andranik Margaryan, Prime Minister of Armenia (2000–2007)
- Austria
  - President –
    1. Thomas Klestil, Federal President of Austria (1992–2004)
    2. Andreas Khol, Barbara Prammer, and Thomas Prinzhorn; Acting Heads of State of Austria (2004) (Note: The three-member presidency of the National Council acted collegially as head of state on 6–8 July—such circumstances ensuing only during a vacancy in the position of Federal President.)
    3. Heinz Fischer, Federal President of Austria (2004–2016)
  - Chancellor – Wolfgang Schüssel, Federal Chancellor of Austria (2000–2007)
- Azerbaijan
  - President – Ilham Aliyev, President of Azerbaijan (2003–present)
  - Prime Minister – Artur Rasizade, Prime Minister of Azerbaijan (2003–2018)
  - Nagorno-Karabakh (unrecognised, secessionist state)
    - President – Arkadi Ghukasyan, President of Nagorno-Karabakh (1997–2007)
    - Prime Minister – Anushavan Danielyan, Prime Minister of Nagorno-Karabakh (1999–2007)
- Belarus
  - President – Alexander Lukashenko, President of Belarus (1994–present)
  - Prime Minister – Sergei Sidorsky, Prime Minister of Belarus (2003–2010)
- Belgium
  - Monarch – Albert II, King of the Belgians (1993–2013)
  - Prime Minister – Guy Verhofstadt, Prime Minister of Belgium (1999–2008)
- Bosnia and Herzegovina
  - Head of State – Presidency of Bosnia and Herzegovina
    - Serb Member – Borislav Paravac (2003–2006; Chairman of the Presidency of Bosnia and Herzegovina, 2004–2005)
    - Bosniak Member – Sulejman Tihić (2002–2006; Chairman of the Presidency of Bosnia and Herzegovina, 2004)
    - Croat Member – Dragan Čović (2002–2005, Chairman of the Presidency of Bosnia and Herzegovina, 2003–2004)
  - Prime Minister – Adnan Terzić, Chairman of the Council of Ministers of Bosnia and Herzegovina (2002–2007)
  - High Representative – Lord (Paddy) Ashdown, High Representative for Bosnia and Herzegovina (2002–2006)
- Bulgaria
  - President – Georgi Parvanov, President of Bulgaria (2002–2012)
  - Prime Minister – Simeon Saxe-Coburg-Gotha, Prime Minister of Bulgaria (2001–2005)
- Croatia
  - President – Stjepan Mesić, President of Croatia (2000–2010)
  - Prime Minister – Ivo Sanader, Prime Minister of Croatia (2003–2009)
- Cyprus
  - President – Tassos Papadopoulos, President of Cyprus (2003–2008)
  - Northern Cyprus (unrecognised, secessionist state)
    - President – Rauf Denktaş, President of Northern Cyprus (1976–2005)
    - Prime Minister –
      1. Derviş Eroğlu, Prime Minister of Northern Cyprus (1996–2004)
      2. Mehmet Ali Talat, Prime Minister of Northern Cyprus (2004–2005)
- Czech Republic
  - President – Václav Klaus, President of the Czech Republic (2003–2013)
  - Prime Minister –
    1. Vladimír Špidla, Prime Minister of the Czech Republic (2002–2004)
    2. Stanislav Gross, Prime Minister of the Czech Republic (2004–2005)
- Denmark
  - Monarch – Margrethe II, Queen of Denmark (1972–2024)
  - Prime Minister – Anders Fogh Rasmussen, Prime Minister of Denmark (2001–2009)
- Estonia
  - President – Arnold Rüütel, President of Estonia (2001–2006)
  - Prime Minister – Juhan Parts, Prime Minister of Estonia (2003–2005)
- European Union
  - President of the European Commission –
    1. Romano Prodi (until 29 November)
    2. José Manuel Barroso (starting 29 November)
  - President of the Parliament –
    1. Pat Cox (until 20 July)
    2. Josep Borrell (starting 20 July)
  - President of the European Council –
    1. Bertie Ahern (January–June)
    2. Jan Peter Balkenende (July–December)
  - Presidency of the Council of the EU –
    1. Ireland (January–July)
    2. Netherlands (July–December)
- Finland
  - President – Tarja Halonen, President of Finland (2000–2012)
  - Prime Minister – Matti Vanhanen, Prime Minister of Finland (2003–2010)
- France
  - President – Jacques Chirac, President of France (1995–2007)
  - Prime Minister – Jean-Pierre Raffarin, Prime Minister of France (2002–2005)
- Georgia
  - President –
    1. Nino Burjanadze, Acting President of Georgia (2003–2004)
    2. Mikheil Saakashvili, President of Georgia (2004–2007)
  - Prime Minister – Zurab Zhvania, Prime Minister of Georgia (Note: His title changed from Minister of State to Prime Minister on 17 February.) (2003–2005)
  - Abkhazia (unrecognised, secessionist state)
    - President – Vladislav Ardzinba, President of Abkhazia (1990–2005) (Note: Abkhazia only declared independence in 1992.)
    - Prime Minister –
      1. Raul Khajimba, Prime Minister of Abkhazia (2003–2004)
      2. Nodar Khashba, Prime Minister of Abkhazia (2004–2005)
  - South Ossetia (unrecognised, secessionist state)
    - President – Eduard Kokoity, President of South Ossetia (2001–2011)
    - Prime Minister – Igor Sanakoyev, Prime Minister of South Ossetia (2003–2005)
- Germany
  - President –
    1. Johannes Rau, Federal President of Germany (1999–2004)
    2. Horst Köhler, Federal President of Germany (2004–2010)
  - Chancellor – Gerhard Schröder, Federal Chancellor of Germany (1998–2005)
- Greece
  - President – Konstantinos Stephanopoulos, President of Greece (1995–2005)
  - Prime Minister –
    1. Costas Simitis, Prime Minister of Greece (1996–2004)
    2. Kostas Karamanlis, Prime Minister of Greece (2004–2009)
- Hungary
  - President – Ferenc Mádl, President of Hungary (2000–2005)
  - Prime Minister
    1. Péter Medgyessy, Prime Minister of Hungary (2002–2004)
    2. Ferenc Gyurcsány, Prime Minister of Hungary (2004–2009)
- Iceland
  - President – Ólafur Ragnar Grímsson, President of Iceland (1996–2016)
  - Prime Minister –
    1. Davíð Oddsson, Prime Minister of Iceland (1991–2004)
    2. Halldór Ásgrímsson, Prime Minister of Iceland (2004–2006)
- Ireland
  - President – Mary McAleese, President of Ireland (1997–2011)
  - Prime Minister – Bertie Ahern, Taoiseach of Ireland (1997–2008)
- Italy
  - President – Carlo Azeglio Ciampi, President of Italy (1999–2006)
  - Prime Minister – Silvio Berlusconi, President of the Council of Ministers of Italy (2001–2006)
- Latvia
  - President – Vaira Vīķe-Freiberga, President of Latvia (1999–2007)
  - Prime Minister –
    1. Einars Repše, Prime Minister of Latvia (2002–2004)
    2. Indulis Emsis, Prime Minister of Latvia (2004)
    3. Aigars Kalvītis, Prime Minister of Latvia (2004–2007)
- Liechtenstein
  - Monarch – Hans-Adam II, Prince Regnant of Liechtenstein (1989–present)
  - Regent – Hereditary Prince Alois, Regent of Liechtenstein (2004–present)
  - Prime Minister – Otmar Hasler, Head of Government of Liechtenstein (2001–2009)
- Lithuania
  - President –
    1. Rolandas Paksas, President of Lithuania (2003–2004)
    2. Artūras Paulauskas, Acting President of Lithuania (2004)
    3. Valdas Adamkus, President of Lithuania (2004–2009)
  - Prime Minister – Algirdas Brazauskas, Prime Minister of Lithuania (2001–2006)
- Luxembourg
  - Monarch – Henri, Grand Duke of Luxembourg (2000–present)
  - Prime Minister – Jean-Claude Juncker, Prime Minister of Luxembourg (1995–2013)
- Macedonia
  - President –
    1. Boris Trajkovski, President of Macedonia (1999–2004)
    2. Ljupčo Jordanovski, Acting President of Macedonia (2004)
    3. Branko Crvenkovski, President of Macedonia (2004–2009)
  - Prime Minister –
    1. Branko Crvenkovski, President of the Government of Macedonia (2002–2004)
    2. Radmila Šekerinska, Acting President of the Government of Macedonia (2004)
    3. Hari Kostov, President of the Government of Macedonia (2004)
    4. Radmila Šekerinska, Acting President of the Government of Macedonia (2004)
    5. Vlado Bučkovski, President of the Government of Macedonia (2004–2006)
- Malta
  - President –
    1. Guido de Marco, President of Malta (1999–2004)
    2. Eddie Fenech Adami, President of Malta (2004–2009)
  - Prime Minister –
    1. Eddie Fenech Adami, Prime Minister of Malta (1998–2004)
    2. Lawrence Gonzi, Prime Minister of Malta (2004–2013)
- Moldova
  - President – Vladimir Voronin, President of Moldova (2001–2009)
  - Prime Minister – Vasile Tarlev, Prime Minister of Moldova (2001–2008)
  - Transnistria (unrecognised, secessionist state)
    - President – Igor Smirnov, President of Transnistria (1990–2011) (Note: Transnistria only declared independence in 1991.)
- Monaco
  - Monarch – Rainier III, Sovereign Prince of Monaco (1949–2005)
  - Prime Minister – Patrick Leclercq, Minister of State of Monaco (2000–2005)
- Kingdom of the Netherlands
  - Monarch – Beatrix, Queen of the Netherlands (1980–2013)
  - Netherlands (constituent country of the Kingdom of the Netherlands)
    - Prime Minister – Jan Peter Balkenende, Prime Minister of the Netherlands (2002–2010)
  - Netherlands Antilles (constituent country of the Kingdom of the Netherlands)
    - see § North America
  - Aruba (constituent country of the Kingdom of the Netherlands)
    - see § North America
- Norway
  - Monarch – Harald V, King of Norway (1991–present)
  - Regent – Crown Prince Haakon, Regent of Norway (2003–2004)
  - Prime Minister – Kjell Magne Bondevik, Prime Minister of Norway (2001–2005)
- Poland
  - President – Aleksander Kwaśniewski, President of Poland (1995–2005)
  - Prime Minister –
    1. Leszek Miller, Chairman of the Council of Ministers of Poland (2001–2004)
    2. Marek Belka, Chairman of the Council of Ministers of Poland (2004–2005)
- Portugal
  - President – Jorge Sampaio, President of Portugal (1996–2006)
  - Prime Minister –
    1. José Manuel Barroso, Prime Minister of Portugal (2002–2004)
    2. Pedro Santana Lopes, Prime Minister of Portugal (2004–2005)
- Romania
  - President –
    1. Ion Iliescu, President of Romania (2000–2004)
    2. Traian Băsescu, President of Romania (2004–2014)
  - Prime Minister –
    1. Adrian Năstase, Prime Minister of Romania (2000–2004)
    2. Eugen Bejinariu, Acting Prime Minister of Romania (2004)
    3. Călin Popescu-Tăriceanu, Prime Minister of Romania (2004–2008)
- Russia
  - President – Vladimir Putin, President of Russia (1999–2008)
  - Prime Minister –
    1. Mikhail Kasyanov, Chairman of the Government of Russia (2000–2004)
    2. Viktor Khristenko, Acting Chairman of the Government of Russia (2004)
    3. Mikhail Fradkov, Chairman of the Government of Russia (2004–2007)
- San Marino
  - Captains-Regent –
    1. Giovanni Lonfernini and Valeria Ciavatta, Captains Regent of San Marino (2003–2004)
    2. Paolo Bollini and Marino Riccardi, Captains Regent of San Marino (2004)
    3. Giuseppe Arzilli and Roberto Raschi, Captains Regent of San Marino (2004–2005)
- Serbia and Montenegro
  - President – Svetozar Marović, President of Serbia and Montenegro (2003–2006)
  - Prime Minister – Svetozar Marović, Prime Minister of Serbia and Montenegro (2003–2006)
  - Kosovo (Self-Governing Entity under UN administration)
    - President – Ibrahim Rugova, President of Kosovo (2002–2006)
    - Prime Minister –
      1. Bajram Rexhepi, Prime Minister of Kosovo (2002–2004)
      2. Ramush Haradinaj, Prime Minister of Kosovo (2004–2005)
    - UN Special Representative –
      1. Harri Holkeri, Special Representative of the UN Secretary-General for Kosovo (2003–2004)
      2. Charles H. Brayshaw, Acting Special Representative of the UN Secretary-General for Kosovo (2004)
      3. Søren Jessen-Petersen, Special Representative of the UN Secretary-General for Kosovo (2004–2006)
- Slovakia
  - President –
    1. Rudolf Schuster, President of Slovakia (1999–2004)
    2. Ivan Gašparovič, President of Slovakia (2004–2014)
  - Prime Minister – Mikuláš Dzurinda, Prime Minister of Slovakia (1998–2006)
- Slovenia
  - President – Janez Drnovšek, President of Slovenia (2002–2007)
  - Prime Minister –
    1. Anton Rop, Prime Minister of Slovenia (2002–2004)
    2. Janez Janša, Prime Minister of Slovenia (2004–2008)
- Spain
  - Monarch – Juan Carlos I, King of Spain (1975–2014)
  - Prime Minister –
    1. José María Aznar, President of the Government of Spain (1996–2004)
    2. José Luis Rodríguez Zapatero, President of the Government of Spain (2004–2011)
- Sweden
  - Monarch – Carl XVI Gustaf, King of Sweden (1973–present)
  - Prime Minister – Göran Persson, Prime Minister of Sweden (1996–2006)
- Switzerland
  - Council – Federal Council of Switzerland (Note: The seven-member Swiss Federal Council is head of state and government collectively. As a party to the Council, the president serves solely in a primus inter pares capacity for one year.)
    - Members – Moritz Leuenberger (1995–2010), Pascal Couchepin (1998–2009), Joseph Deiss (1999–2006; President of Switzerland, 2004), Samuel Schmid (2000–2008), Micheline Calmy-Rey (2002–2011), Christoph Blocher (2003–2007), and Hans-Rudolf Merz (2003–2010)
- Turkey
  - President – Ahmet Necdet Sezer, President of Turkey (2000–2007)
  - Prime Minister – Recep Tayyip Erdoğan, Prime Minister of Turkey (2003–2014)
- Ukraine
  - President – Leonid Kuchma, President of Ukraine (1994–2005)
  - Prime Minister –
    1. Viktor Yanukovych, Prime Minister of Ukraine (2002–2005)
    2. Mykola Azarov, Acting Prime Minister of Ukraine (2004)
- United Kingdom
  - Monarch – Elizabeth II, Queen of the United Kingdom (1952–2022)
  - Prime Minister – Tony Blair, Prime Minister of the United Kingdom (1997–2007)
  - Isle of Man (Crown dependency of the United Kingdom)
    - Lieutenant-Governor – Ian Macfadyen, Lieutenant Governor of the Isle of Man (2000–2005)
    - Chief Minister –
      1. Richard Corkill, Chief Minister of the Isle of Man (2001–2004)
      2. Donald Gelling, Chief Minister of the Isle of Man (2004–2006)
  - Guernsey (Crown dependency of the United Kingdom)
    - Lieutenant-Governor – Sir John Foley, Lieutenant Governor of Guernsey (2000–2005)
    - Bailiff – Sir de Vic Carey, Bailiff of Guernsey (1999–2005)
    - Chief Minister – Laurie Morgan, Chief Minister of Guernsey (2004–2007)
  - Jersey (Crown dependency of the United Kingdom)
    - Lieutenant-Governor – Sir John Cheshire, Lieutenant Governor of Jersey (2001–2006)
    - Bailiff – Sir Philip Bailhache, Bailiff of Jersey (1995–2009)
  - Gibraltar (Overseas Territory of the United Kingdom)
    - Governor – Sir Francis Richards, Governor of Gibraltar (2003–2006)
    - Chief Minister – Peter Caruana, Chief Minister of Gibraltar (1996–2011)
- Vatican City
  - Monarch – Pope John Paul II, Sovereign of Vatican City (1978–2005)
  - Head of Government – Cardinal Edmund Szoka, President of the Governorate of Vatican City (1997–2006)
  - Holy See (sui generis subject of public international law)
    - Secretary of State – Cardinal Angelo Sodano, Cardinal Secretary of State (1990–2006)

== Events ==
=== May ===
- May 1: The 2004 enlargement of Europe occurs.

=== August ===
- August 13-30: Greece hosts the 2004 Summer Olympics in Athens; also known as the Games of the XXVIII Olympiad. 10,625 athletes were in attendance across 201 teams, competing in 301 events.

=== November ===
- The European Space Agency probe Smart-1 reaches the moon and became the first European satellite to fly to the moon, as well as orbit it.

== See also ==
- 2004 in the European Union
- List of state leaders in Europe in 2004
