= Monegasque heraldry =

Albert II, Prince of Monaco, head of the House of Grimaldi
- Shield: Fusily argent and gules
- Motto: DEO JUVANTE

The heraldry of Monaco, a state of just two-square kilometers, is dominated by the royal heraldry of the ruling family, the House of Grimaldi. Its dynastic head, Albert II, utilises the same arms borne by his ancestors. The ruler does not regularly award titles; indeed, it has not happened at all in the last two reigns.

== Coat of arms of Monaco ==
The coat of arms of Monaco, blazoned Fusily argent and gules, is shown supported by two armed monks. These reflect the original conquest of Monaco by the Grimaldi family.

In full, it is defined as:

The shield lozengy argent and gules, surrounded by the collar of the Order of Saint-Charles, is placed on a red coat lined with ermine, surmonted by the princely crown. Supporters: Two Friars Minor hairy, bearded and wearing shoes, each of them holding a raised sword, standing on a scroll charged with the motto: DEO JUVANTE (with God's help).

The motto, Deo Juvante, dates back to Lambert Grimaldi d'Antibes (1420–1494).

The coat of arms is used on the princely flag of Monaco (variously "princely standard", "government flag", "state flag and ensign, war flag and ensign") as the central charge on a white background, under Article 7 of the Monegasque Constitution, which reads "The Princely flag shall be made of the arms of the House of Grimaldi on a white background". The civil flag utilises red and white, the heraldic colours of the House of Grimaldi.

== Orders ==
There are several orders of the Monegasque crown: the Order of Saint Charles (created 15 March 1858); the Order of Cultural Merit (created 31 December 1952); the Order of Grimaldi (created 18 May 1954) and the Order of the Crown (created 20 July 1960). With the exception of the Order of Cultural Merit, the Prince of Monaco is head of each order as its Grand-Master.
