= Lorenzo Arrazola y García =

Spanish lawyer, politician and statesman

The Most Excellent Lorenzo Arrazola
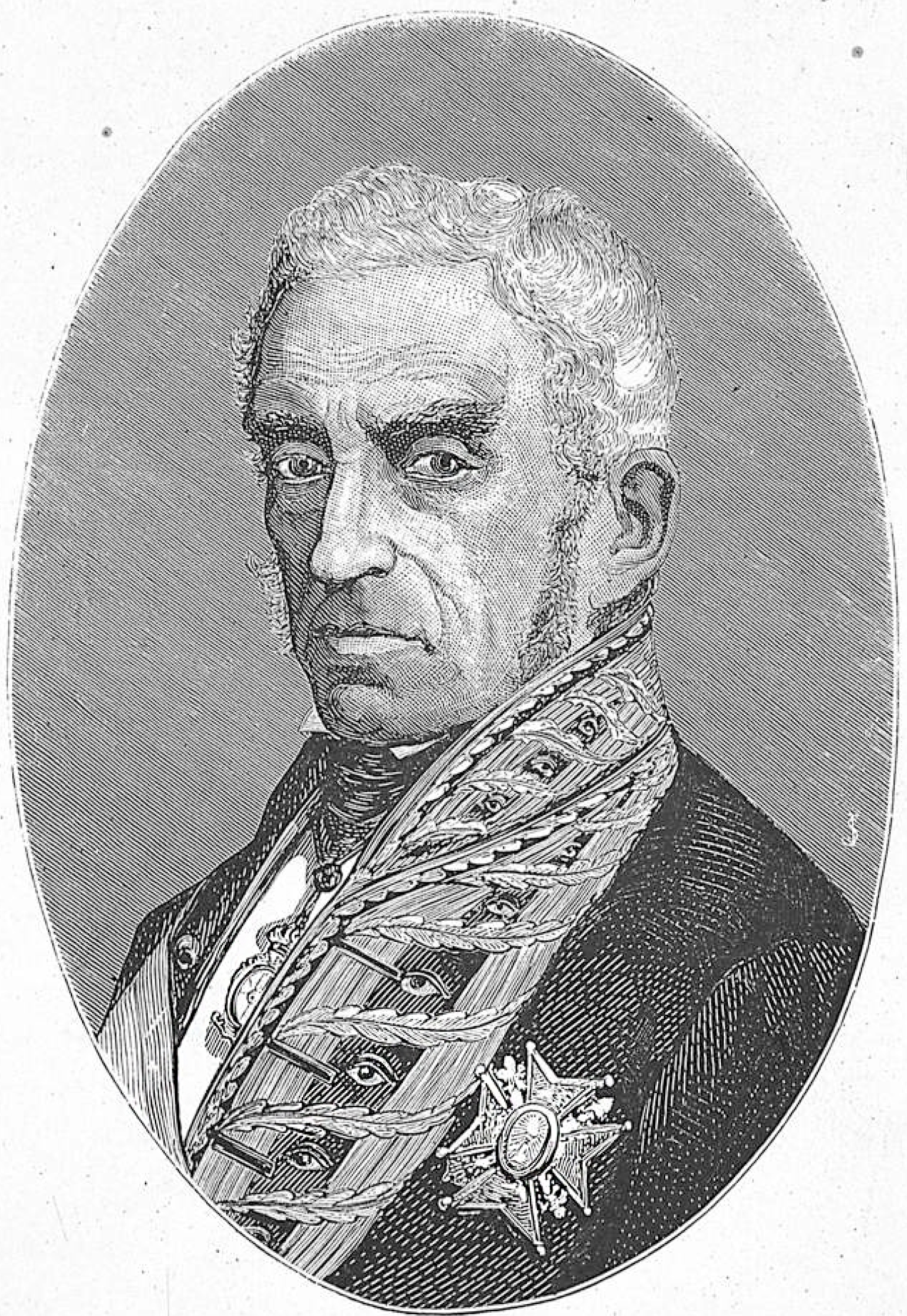

Prime Minister of Spain
- In office 17 January 1864 – 1 March 1864
- Monarch: Isabella II
- Preceded by: The Marquis of Miraflores
- Succeeded by: Alejandro Mon y Menéndez

Personal details
- Born: 10 August 1795 Checa, Guadalajara, Kingdom of Spain
- Died: 23 February 1873 (aged 75) Madrid, First Spanish Republic
- Party: Moderate Party
- Spouse: Ana Micaela Guerrero
- Education: University of Valladolid
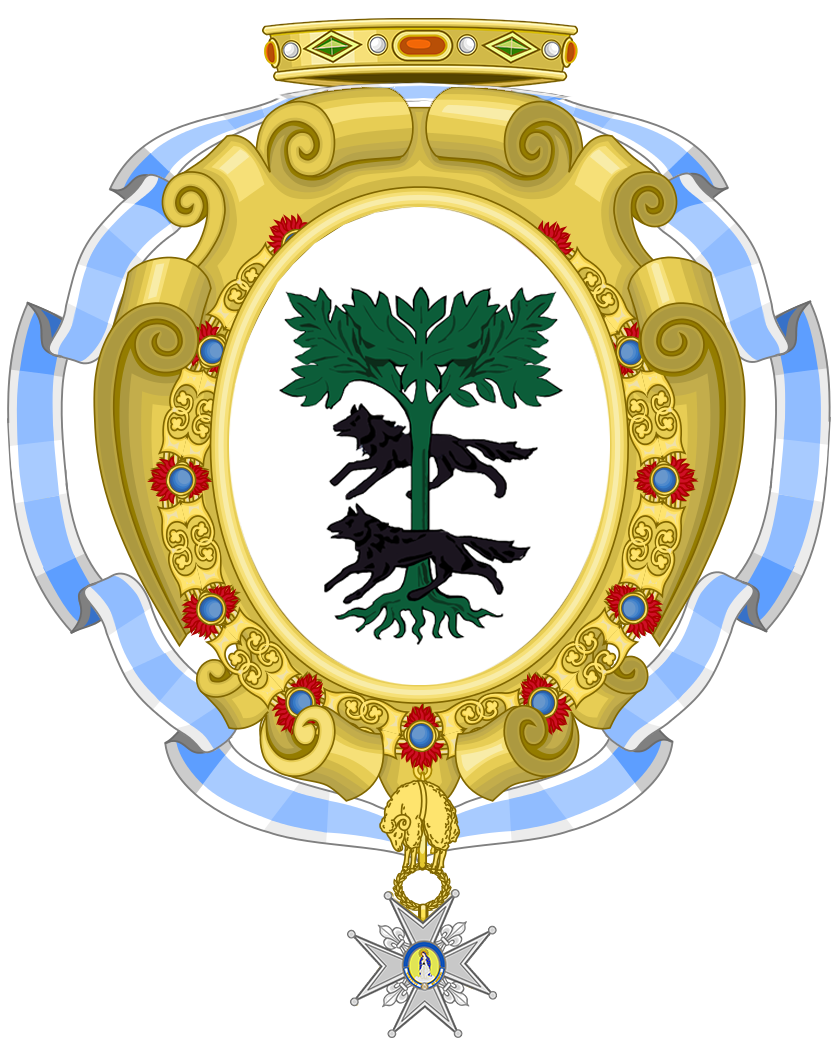
- Coat of arms of Lorenzo Arrazola

D. Lorenzo Arrazola y García (10 August 1795, in Checa, Guadalajara, Spain – 23 February 1873, in Madrid, Spain) was a Spanish lawyer, politician and statesman best known for being Prime Minister of Spain, a six term Minister of Justice and two-time President of the Supreme Court.

== Early life ==
García was born in Checa, a small town in Guadalajara. He was able to attend a seminary with the help of his mother's brother, mayor of a village in Benavente. There, he completed his early education, eventually graduating with a degree in theology and philosophy, during which time he became fluent in Latin. At 28, García left the seminary in order to join the military, against his uncle's wishes. He later went to Valladolid to study civil jurisprudence, becoming chair of the philosophy department and, later, rector of the university. García then went to Complutense University, where he spent a decade as a part of the faculty.

In 1829, he married Ana Micaela Guerrera. She was a native of Villanueva de Campa, where García had helped to repair the church after it set fire in 1850.

He began his political career in 1835, at age 38, seeking to be elected procurator. In 1837 was designated deputy of the courts in Valladolid, leaving behind law and teaching. His ideological principles settled as he joined the Moderate Party and the Ateneo de Madrid.

== Career ==
In 1837 Arrazola entered his first election, becoming a member of Spain's Congress of Deputies, a seat he held until February 1841. In December 1838 he started his first of six terms as Minister of Grace and Justice.

In thanks for creating a new Criminal Code, Queen Isabella II made Arrazola a senator-for-life on 23 December 1848.

He served as Prosecutor of the Supreme Court for a short period of time between April and October 1847. He was confirmed as President of the Supreme Court in 1851, a position he held until 1853 and again between 1856 and 1864.

Between 1864 and 1867 he is both Minister of Justice and Minister of Interior at interim.

Political offices
Preceded by The Marquis of Miraflores	Prime Minister of Spain; 17 January 1864 – 1 March 1864	Succeeded by Alejandro Mon
Preceded by The Marquis of Miraflores	Minister of State; 17 January 1864 – 1 March 1864	Succeeded by Joaquín Francisco Pacheco
Preceded by Antonio de Benavides	Minister of State; Acting; 8 June 1865 – 21 June 1865	Succeeded by Manuel Bermúdez de Castro
Preceded by Manuel Bermúdez de Castro	Minister of State; Acting; 10 July 1866 – 13 July 1866	Succeeded by Eusebio de Calonge y Fenollet
Preceded by Alejandro de Castro	Minister of State; 27 June 1867 – 23 April 1868	Succeeded by The Marquis of Roncali
