= Order of Saint Charles =

Monegasque order of merit

Order of Saint Charles Ordre de Saint-Charles
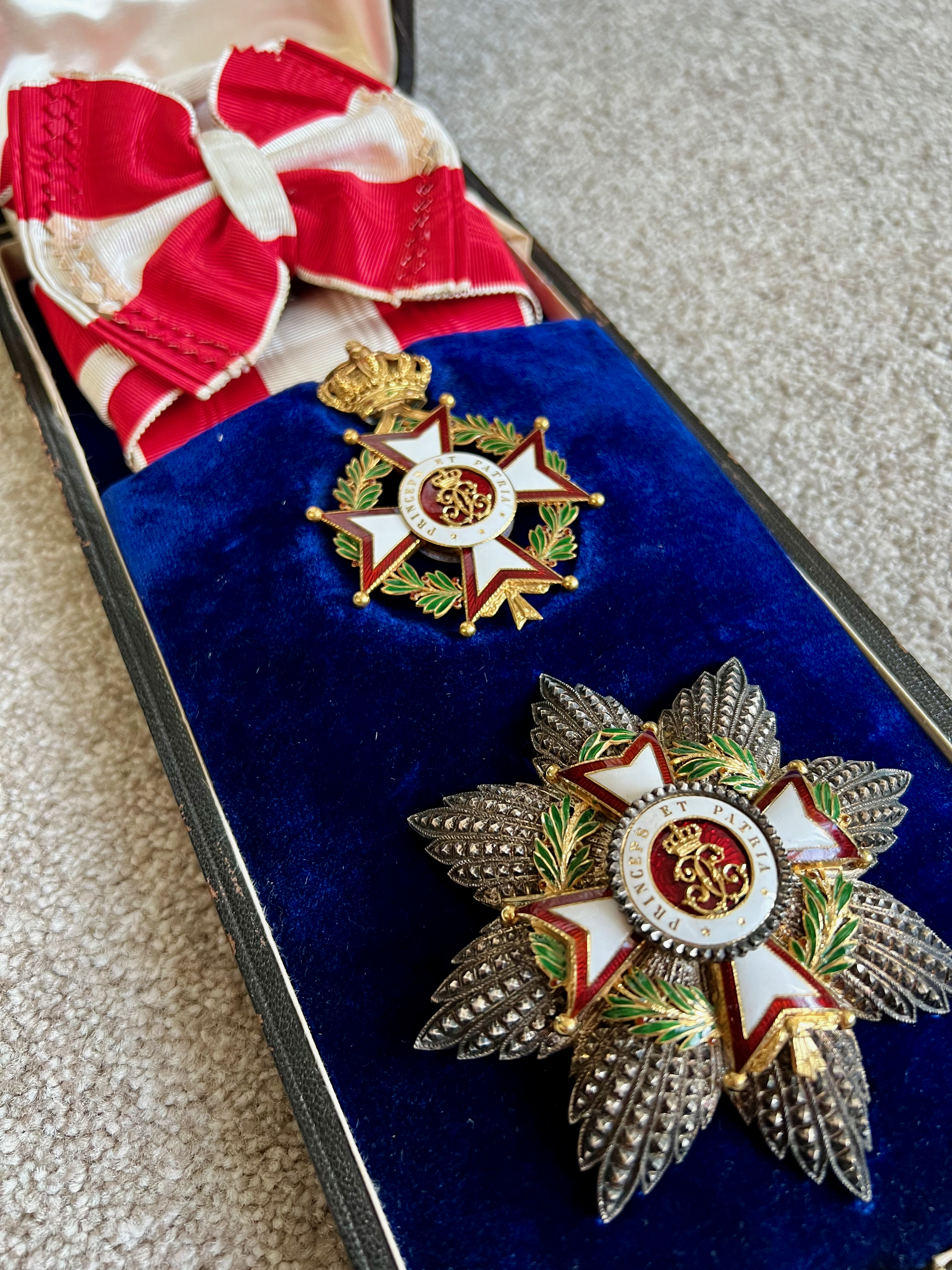
- Grand Cross insignia

Awarded by Prince of Monaco
- Motto: Princeps et patria
- Eligibility: Citizens of Monaco and foreigners
- Awarded for: Merit and services to the State or Prince
- Status: Currently constituted
- Grand Master: Prince Albert II
- Chancellor: Raoul Biancheri, Plenipotentiary Minister
- Grades: Knight Grand Cross; Grand Officer; Commander; Officer; Knight

Precedence
- Next (higher): None (highest)
- Next (lower): Order of the Crown
- Ribbon bar of the Order of St. Charles

Grand Officer insignia of the Order of Saint Charles

The Order of Saint Charles (French: Ordre de Saint-Charles; Monégasque: U̍rdine de San Carlu) is a state and dynastic order of knighthood established in Monaco on 15 March 1858.

== Award ==
This order rewards service to the State or Prince. In particular cases, it may be granted to foreigners. It is awarded by the current Grand Master, Prince Albert II.

=== Reception ===
Except for Members of the Princely Family and foreigners, one can only receive the Order first with the rank of Knight. To be awarded the following higher ranks, one must keep the lower rank for a set length of time:

- Officer: four years as a Knight
- Commander: three years as an Officer
- Grand Officer: four years as a Commander
- Knight Grand Cross: five years as a Grand Officer

Nominations belong to the Grand Master. The Chancellor proposes promotions. According to the Prince's orders, the Chancellor proposes the projects of nomination and promotion ordonnances. The grantees must be received in the Order before wearing the decorations. The Grand-Master receives the Grand Crosses, Grand Officers and Commanders. The Chancellor receives the Officers and Knights. Foreigners are admitted to the Order, but not received.

=== Funeral honours ===
- Commanders, Officers and Knights are honoured in the choir of the church and warded by four carabiniers in ceremonial uniform and weapon commanded by a Sub-Officer.
- Knights Grand Cross and Grand Officers are honoured outside the church, at the beginning and end of the funeral ceremony, by 24 carabiniers in ceremonial uniform and weapon commanded by an Officer.

== Classes and design ==
=== Knight Grand Cross ===
The Knight Grand Cross wears the badge of the order on a sash and the star of the order on the left of the breast. There is a golden necklet that is attached to the Order. It has small empty egg-shaped sections that form the necklet. The badge is sometimes worn attached to this collar instead of the sash.

=== Grand Officer ===
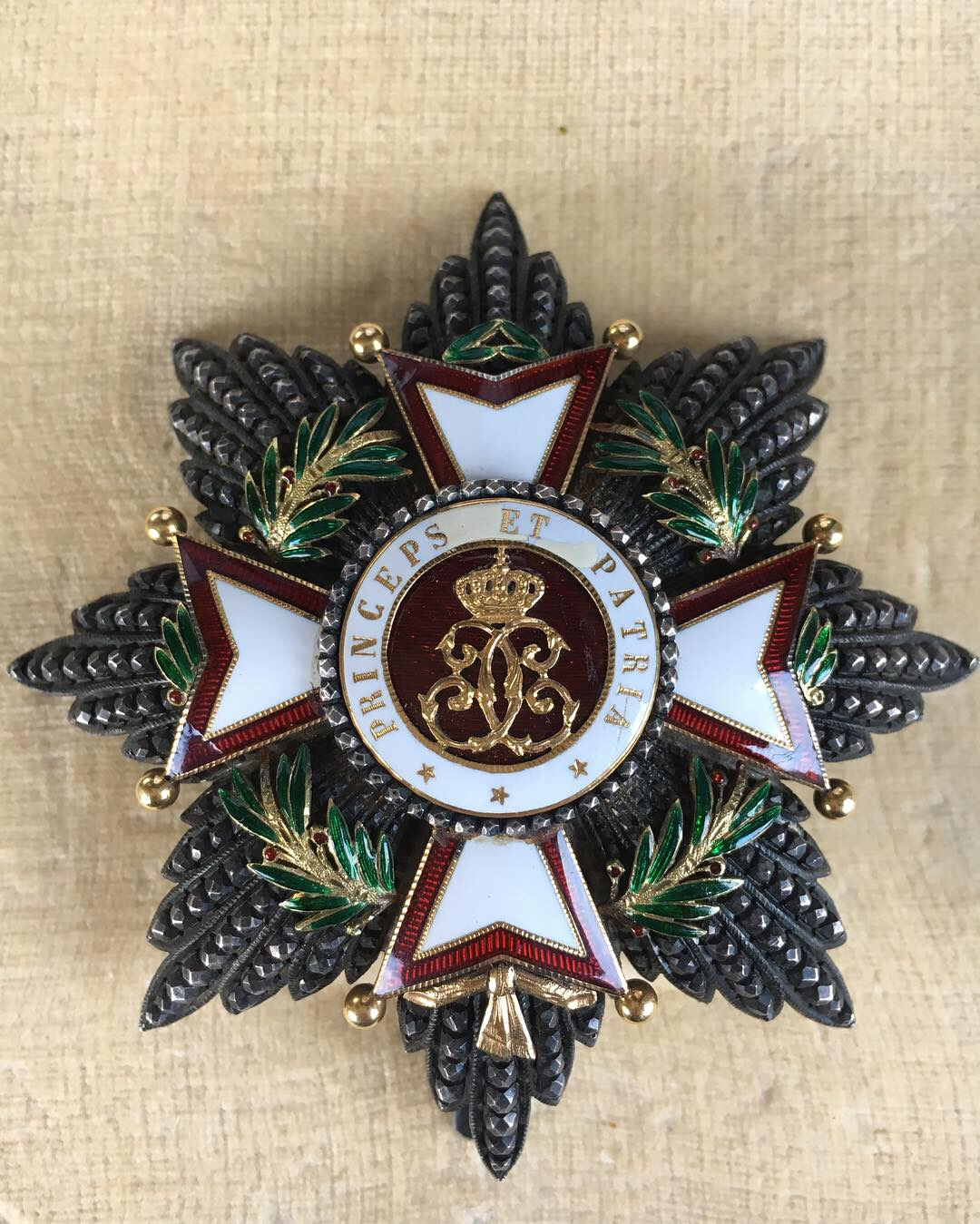
Star of the Order

The Grand Officer wears a badge and a star. The Star of the Order of St. Charles is made of silver. The badge of the Order of St. Charles is worn on a chest ribbon with rosette or on a bow. The star is worn on the right side of the chest.

=== Commander ===
The Commander of the Order of St. Charles wears the badge on a ribbon around the neck or on a bow on the left shoulder.

=== Officer ===
The Officer of the Order of St. Charles wears the badge on a chest ribbon with a rosette. The cross has a thinner laurel-wreath than the Knight of the Order of St. Charles.

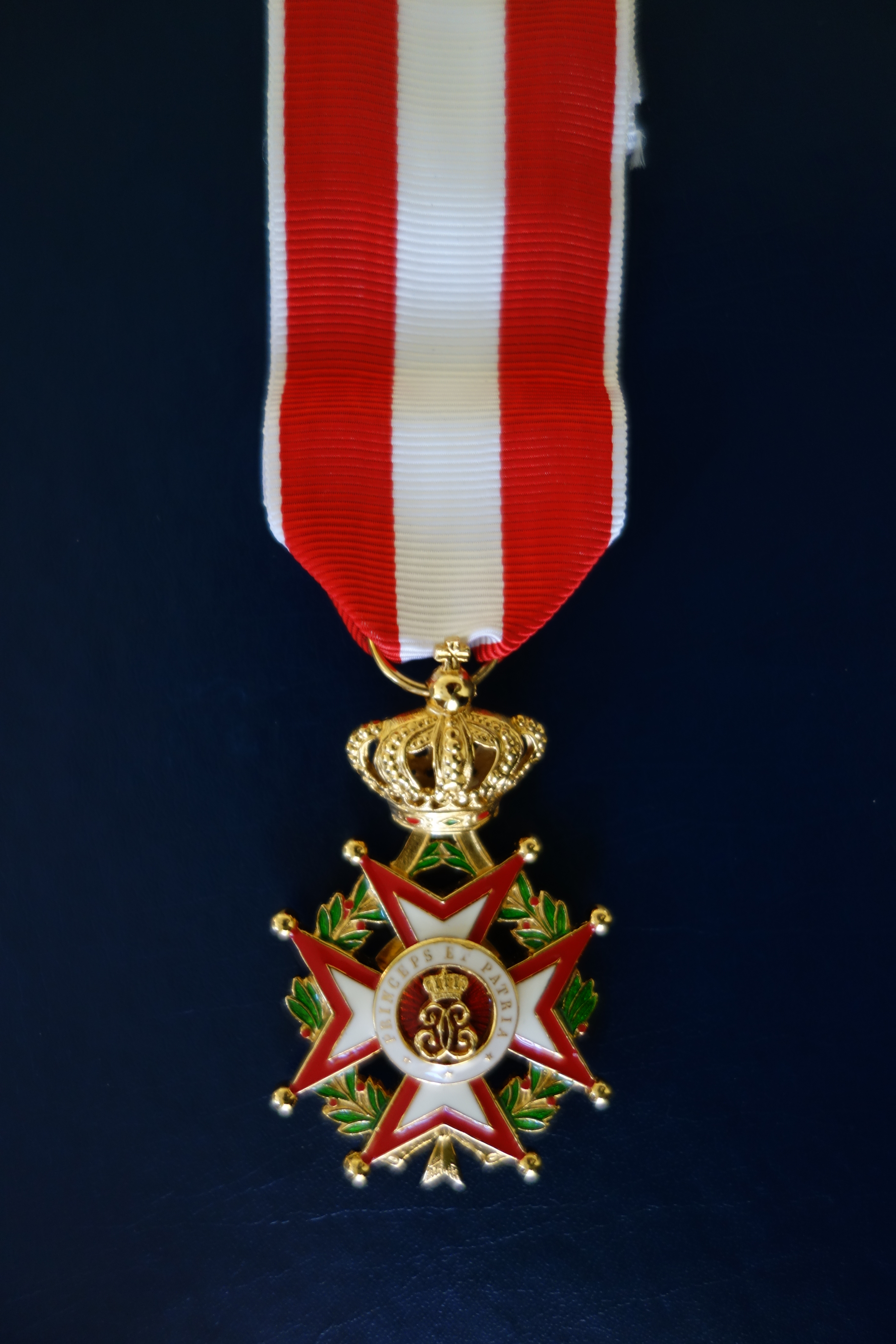
Knight cross of the Order of St Charles

=== Knight ===
The Knight of the Order of St. Charles wears the badge of the order on a chest ribbon without rosette.

Ribbon bars
Grand Cross	Grand Officer	Commander	Officer	Knight

== Legal basis ==
- Sovereign Ordonnance of 16 January 1863 about the Order of Saint-Charles (modified) : Text (French)
- Sovereign Ordonnance of 16 January 186 establishing the statutes of the Order of Saint-Charles (modified) : Text (French)
- Sovereign Ordonnance n° 125 of 23 April 1923 concerning the insignias of the Order of Saint-Charles : Text (French)

== Notable recipients ==
=== Knights Grand Cross ===
==== Granted by Charles III, Prince of Monaco ====
- Oscar II of Sweden and Norway – 16 January 1862.
- Christian IX of Denmark – 7 February 1864.
- Muhammad III as-Sadiq – 28 December 1864.
- Louis III, Grand Duke of Hesse – 23 April 1865.
- Prince Alexander of Hesse and by Rhine – 23 April 1865.
- Isabella II of Spain – 17 September 1865.
- Alfonso XII of Spain – 17 September 1865.
- Charles I of Württemberg – 24 September 1865.
- Édouard Drouyn de Lhuys – 24 December 1865.
- Manuel Bermúdez de Castro y Díez – 2 June 1866.
- Juan de Zavala – 2 June 1866.
- Prince Charles of Prussia – 6 April 1869.
- Frederick I, Grand Duke of Baden – 19 October 1869.
- Napoleon III – 16 November 1869.
- Pedro II of Brazil – 19 March 1872.
- Franz Joseph I of Austria – 24 September 1872.
- Alexander II of Russia – 22 July 1873.
- Şehzade Yusuf Izzeddin – 8 September 1874.
- Gustaf V of Sweden – 6 April 1875.
- William III of the Netherlands – 13 April 1875.
- Amadeo I of Spain – 27 April 1875.
- Fontes Pereira de Melo – 18 July 1876.
- Louis, duc Decazes – 20 March 1877.
- Antoine Chanzy – 30 April 1878.
- Mustapha Ben Ismaïl – 16 July 1878.
- Count Gustav Kálnoky – 11 April 1882.
- Karl Anton, Prince of Hohenzollern – 26 September 1882.
- Milan I of Serbia – 29 May 1883.
- Alexander III of Russia – 14 August 1883.
- Nikolay Girs – 21 August 1883.
- Wilhelm Karl, Duke of Urach – 4 December 1883.
- Prince Carl, Duke of Västergötland – 5 August 1884.
- Albrecht, Duke of Württemberg – 12 February 1889.

==== Granted by Albert I, Prince of Monaco ====
- Jules François Émile Krantz – 19 Novembre 1889.
- Victor Emmanuel III of Italy – 30 Decembre 1890.
- Ferdinand I of Bulgaria – 11 May 1892.
- Félix Faure – 3 March 1896.
- Nicholas II of Russia – 16 May 1896.
- Karl Theodor, Duke in Bavaria – 4 Novembre 1897.
- Wilhelm, German Crown Prince – 15 January 1900.
- Paul Kruger – 11 December 1900.
- Émile Loubet – 15 March 1901.
- Louis André – 31 Decembre 1901.
- Jules Massenet – 18 February 1902.
- Pierre Waldeck-Rousseau – 10 June 1902.
- Edward VII – 25 June 1902.
- Juan Manuel Sánchez, Duke of Almodóvar del Río – 30 Octobre 1902.
- Camille Saint-Saëns – 18 February 1904.
- Luís Filipe, Prince Royal of Portugal – 22 July 1904.
- Prince Philipp of Saxe-Coburg and Gotha – 21 March 1905.
- Hugo von Radolin – 3 April 1905.
- Wilhelm von Hahnke – 14 April 1907.
- Helmuth von Moltke the Younger – 14 April 1907.
- Heinrich von Tschirschky – 14 April 1907.
- Armand Fallières – 27 April 1909.
- Manuel II of Portugal – 13 August 1909.
- Antonino Paternò Castello, Marchese di San Giuliano – 19 May 1910.
- Marc Hautefeuille – 2 February 1911.
- Ahmad Shah Qajar – 14 January 1915.
- Mohammad Hassan Mirza – 14 January 1915.
- Samad Khan Momtaz os-Saltaneh – 14 January 1915.
- Pietro Gasparri – 8 February 1916.
- Arthur Walsh, 3rd Baron Ormathwaite – 5 July 1916.
- Henri Le Rond – 23 May 1922.

==== Granted by Louis II, Prince of Monaco ====
- Alexandre Millerand – 16 January 1923.
- Prince Emmanuel, Duke of Vendôme – 19 June 1923.
- Raymond Le Bourdon – 23 October 1923.
- Maurizio Ferrante Gonzaga – 1 April 1924.
- Louis-Ernest Dubois – 17 May 1924.
- Fernand David – 19 November 1925.
- Gregor Carl Georg Aminoff - 1926
- Philippe Pétain – 27 January 1927.
- Prince Wilhelm, Duke of Södermanland – 14 April 1927.
- Charles D. B. King – 14 July 1927.
- Edwin Barclay – 20 October 1927.
- Charles Binet – 11 October 1928.
- Count Carl August Ehrensvärd – 7 March 1929.
- Paul Painlevé – 22 August 1929.
- Umberto II of Italy – 16 January 1930.
- Benito Mussolini – 16 January 1930.
- Louis Franchet d'Espèrey – 27 February 1930.
- Pope Pius XII – 27 February 1930.
- Edmond de Gaiffier d'Hestroy – 24 July 1930.
- Leopold III of Belgium – 7 August 1930.
- Paul Doumer – 31 March 1932.
- Hubert Lyautey – 21 April 1932.
- Prajadhipok – 1 March 1934.
- Albert Lebrun – 5 July 1934.
- Giuliano Gozi – 2 May 1935.
- Knud, Hereditary Prince of Denmark – 5 March 1936.
- Edvard Beneš – 17 February 1938.
- Emmanuel Célestin Suhard – 15 September 1938.
- Princess Antoinette, Baroness of Massy – 28 December 1938.
- Édouard Daladier – 1 June 1939.
- Prince Andrew of Greece and Denmark – 14 March 1940.
- George II of Greece – 11 April 1940.
- Prince Rainier of Monaco – 5 June 1941.
- Charles de Gaulle – 5 October 1944.
- Ghislaine, Princess consort of Monaco – 31 October 1946.
- Pope John XXIII – 10 July 1947.
- Marie-Pierre Kœnig – 4 September 1947.
- George VI – 13 November 1947.
- Paul of Greece – 29 November 1947.
- Charlotte, Grand Duchess of Luxembourg – 20 January 1949.

==== Granted by Rainier III, Prince of Monaco ====
- Prince Philip, Duke of Edinburgh – 15 February 1951.
- Robert Schuman – 21 January 1952.
- Alcide De Gasperi – 20 January 1954.
- Giuseppe Pella – 20 January 1954.
- René Coty – 2 December 1954.
- Princess Grace of Monaco - 17 April 1956.
- Albert II of Belgium – 13 October 1957.
- Victoria Eugenie of Battenberg – 19 April 1958.
- Moens de Fernig Georges – 22 November 1958.
- Jullien André – 28 January 1959.
- Gobert d'Aspremont Lynden – 24 June 1959.
- Michel Debré – 12 October 1959.
- Jacques Chaban-Delmas – 12 October 1959.
- Giovanni Gronchi – 4 November 1959.
- Cesare Merzagora – 4 November 1959.
- Giovanni Leone – 4 November 1959.
- Antonio Segni – 4 November 1959.
- Gaetano Azzariti – 4 November 1959.
- Eugène Tisserant – 27 January 1960.
- Éamon de Valera – 10 June 1961.
- Infante Juan, Count of Barcelona – 11 May 1962.
- Maurice Feltin – 26 January 1963.
- Américo Tomás – 17 April 1964.
- António de Oliveira Salazar – 17 April 1964.
- Marc Jacquet – 18 November 1965.
- Giovanni Colombo – 6 November 1966.
- Anastasio Somoza Debayle – 23 October 1968.
- Pierre Blanchy – 18 November 1971.
- Princess Caroline of Monaco — 18 November 1981.
- Vittorio Emanuele of Savoy — 1 March 2003.
- Mireya Moscoso — 25 July 2003.
- Alejandro Toledo — 21 November 2003.
- Abel Pacheco de la Espriella — 21 November 2003.
- Georgi Parvanov — 26 November 2004.

==== Granted by Albert II, Prince of Monaco ====
- Carlo Azeglio Ciampi, President of Italy—Sovereign Ordonnance n° 331 of 13 December 2005.
- Janez Drnovšek, President of Slovenia—Sovereign Ordonnance n° 531 of 31 May 2006.
- Zine El Abidine Ben Ali, President of Tunisia—Sovereign Ordonnance n° 680 of 7 September 2006.
- Nicolas Sarkozy, President of France—Sovereign Ordonnance n° 1622 of 25 April 2008.
- Stjepan Mesić, President of Croatia—Sovereign Ordonnance n°2164 of 16 April 2009.
- Traian Băsescu, President of Romania—Sovereign Ordonnance n° 2165 of 16 April 2009.
- Fra' Matthew Festing, Prince and Grand Master of the Order of Malta—Sovereign Ordonnance n° 2405 of 14 October 2009.
- Abdoulaye Wade, President of Senegal—Sovereign Ordonnance n° 2457 of 9 November 2009.
- Francesco Mussoni and Stefano Palmieri, Captains Regent of San Marino—Sovereign Ordonnance n° 2654 of 5 March 2010.
- Danilo Türk, President of Slovenia—Sovereign Ordonnance n° 3076 of 11 January 2011.
- Michel Suleiman, President of Lebanon—Sovereign Ordonnance n° 3077 of 13 January 2011.
- Amadou Toumani Touré, President of Mali—Sovereign Ordonnance n° 3668 of 13 February 2012.
- Joachim Gauck, President of Germany—Sovereign Ordonnance n° 3839 of 9 July 2012.
- Dalia Grybauskaitė, President of Lithuania—Sovereign Ordonnance n° 3987 of 15 October 2012
- Bronisław Komorowski, President of Poland—Sovereign Ordonnance n° 3989 of 17 October 2012 (French)
- Anna Komorowska, his wife—Sovereign Ordonnance n° 3990 of 17 October 2012
- Charlene, Princess of Monaco—Sovereign Ordonnance n° 4038 of 17 November 2012.
- Ban Ki-moon, Secretary-General of the United Nations—Sovereign Ordonnance n° 4251 of 3 April 2013.
- Nursultan Nazarbayev, President of Kazakhstan—Sovereign Ordonnance n° 4.491 of 27 September 2013.
- Vladimir Putin, President of Russia—Sovereign Ordonnance n° 4504 of 4 October 2013.
- François Hollande, President of France—Sovereign Ordonnance n° 4575 of 14 November 2013.
- Andrea Belluzzi, Captain-Regent of San Marino—Sovereign Ordonnance n° 5490 of 16 September 2015.
- Roberto Venturini, Captain-Regent of San Marino—Sovereign Ordonnance n°5490 of 16 September 2015.
- Aleksandar Vučić, President of Serbia—Sovereign Ordonnance n°9115 of 22 February 2022.
- Abdullah of Pahang, Yang di-Pertuan Agong of Malaysia—Sovereign Ordonnance n° 10223 of 27 November 2023.

=== Grand Officers ===
==== Granted by Rainier III, Prince of Monaco ====
- Prince Pierre, Duke of Valentinois – 19 April 1958.
- Juan Carlos I of Spain – 11 May 1962.
- Constantine II of Greece – 11 May 1962.
- Fernando Quintaniiha Mendonca Dias – 17 April 1964.
- Jean Reymond – 18 November 1966.
- René Maheu – 18 May 1967.
- Jean-Charles Rey – 18 November 1967.
- Jean Brouchot – 18 November 1972.
- Auguste Médecin – 8 May 1974.
- Louis Trotabas – 18 November 1975.
- Patrick Leclercq, Minister of State of Monaco—Sovereign Ordonnance n°15560 of 18 November 2002.
- Emanuele Filiberto of Savoy, Heir Prince of the Royal Italian Family—Sovereign Ordonnance n° 15703 of 1 March 2003.

==== Granted by Albert II, Prince of Monaco ====
- Jean-Paul Proust, Minister of State of Monaco —Sovereign Ordonnance n° 2694 of 25 March 2010.
- Hubert Charles, President of the Supreme Court of Monaco—Sovereign Ordonnance n° 4039 of 17 October 2012
- His Royal Highness Tengku Amir Shah of Selangor, Malaysia (Crown Prince of Selangor, Malaysia)—Sovereign Ordonnance n° 10224 of 27 November 2023
- His Royal Highness Tengku Hassanal Ibrahim Alam Shah of Pahang, Malaysia (Crown Prince of Pahang, Malaysia)—Sovereign Ordonnance n° 10224 of 27 November 2023
- His Highness Tengku Muhammad Iskandar Ri'ayatuddin Shah of Pahang, Malaysia—Sovereign Ordonnance n° 10224 of 27 November 2023

=== Commanders ===
==== Granted by Rainier III, Prince of Monaco ====
- Jacques Diouf, Director-General of the Food and Agriculture Organization (FAO) -- Sovereign Ordonnance n°15534 of 12 October 2002.

==== Granted by Albert II, Prince of Monaco ====
- Max Mosley, Former President of the Fédération Internationale de l'Automobile—Sovereign Ordonnance n° 526, 27 May 2006.
- Bernie Ecclestone—Sovereign Ordonnance n° 528 of 27 May 2006.
- Serge Telle, Ambassador of France in Monaco—Sovereign Ordonnance n° 1140 of 6 June 2007.
- Edi Rama, Prime Minister of Albania — Sovereign Ordonnance n° 7.419 of 10 April 2019.

== Gallery ==
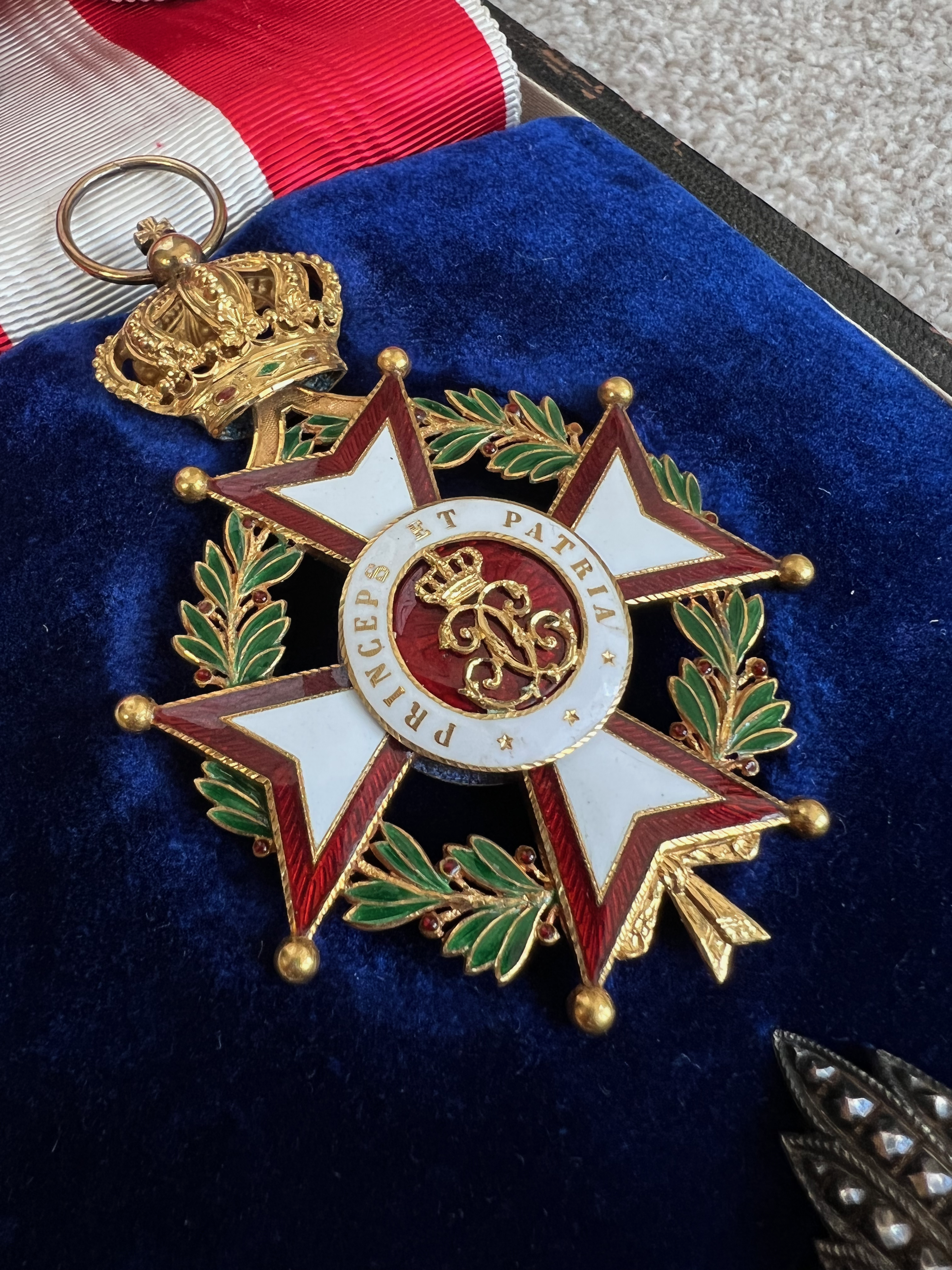
Grand Cross badge (obverse)

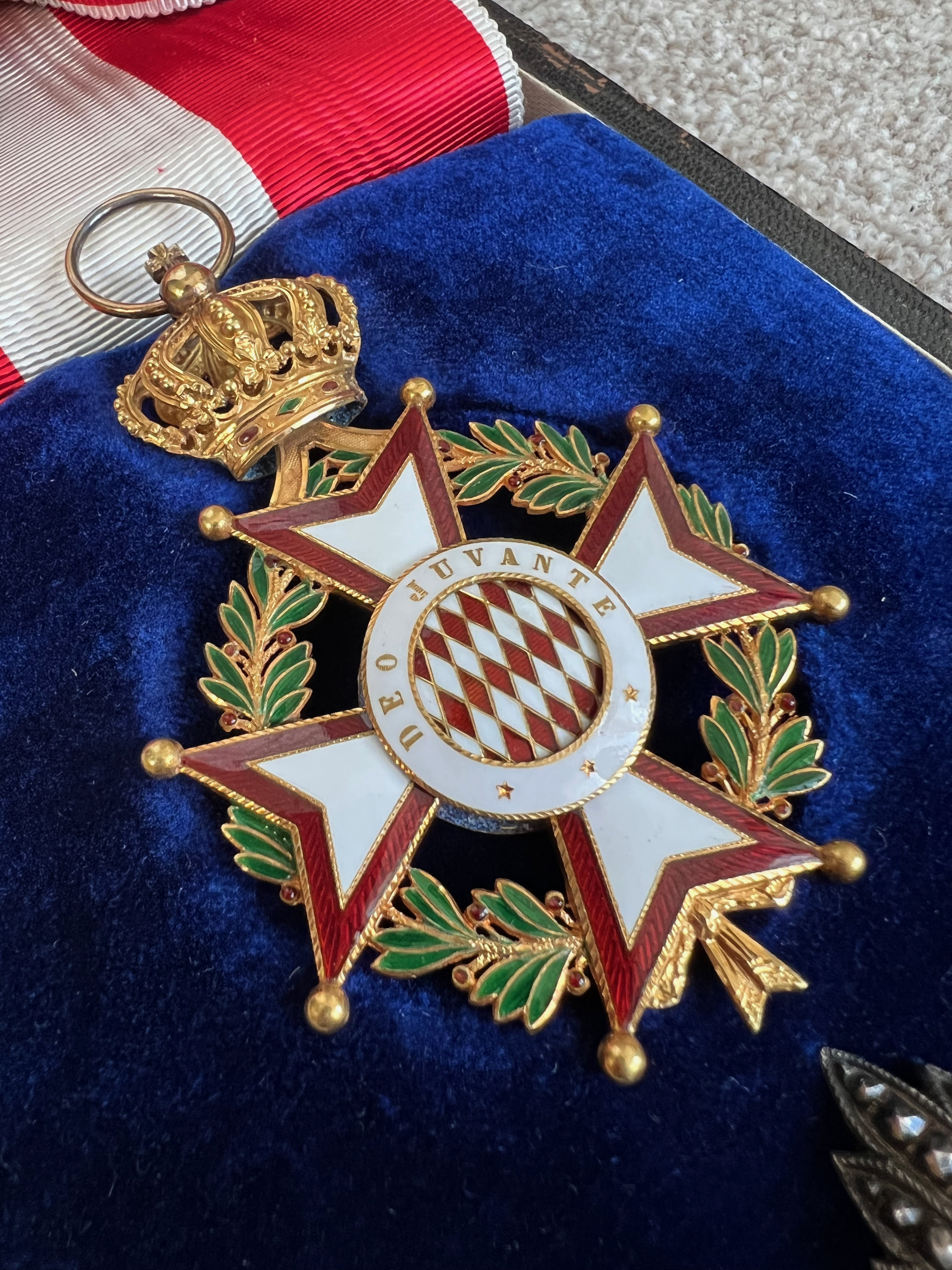
Grand Cross badge (reverse)

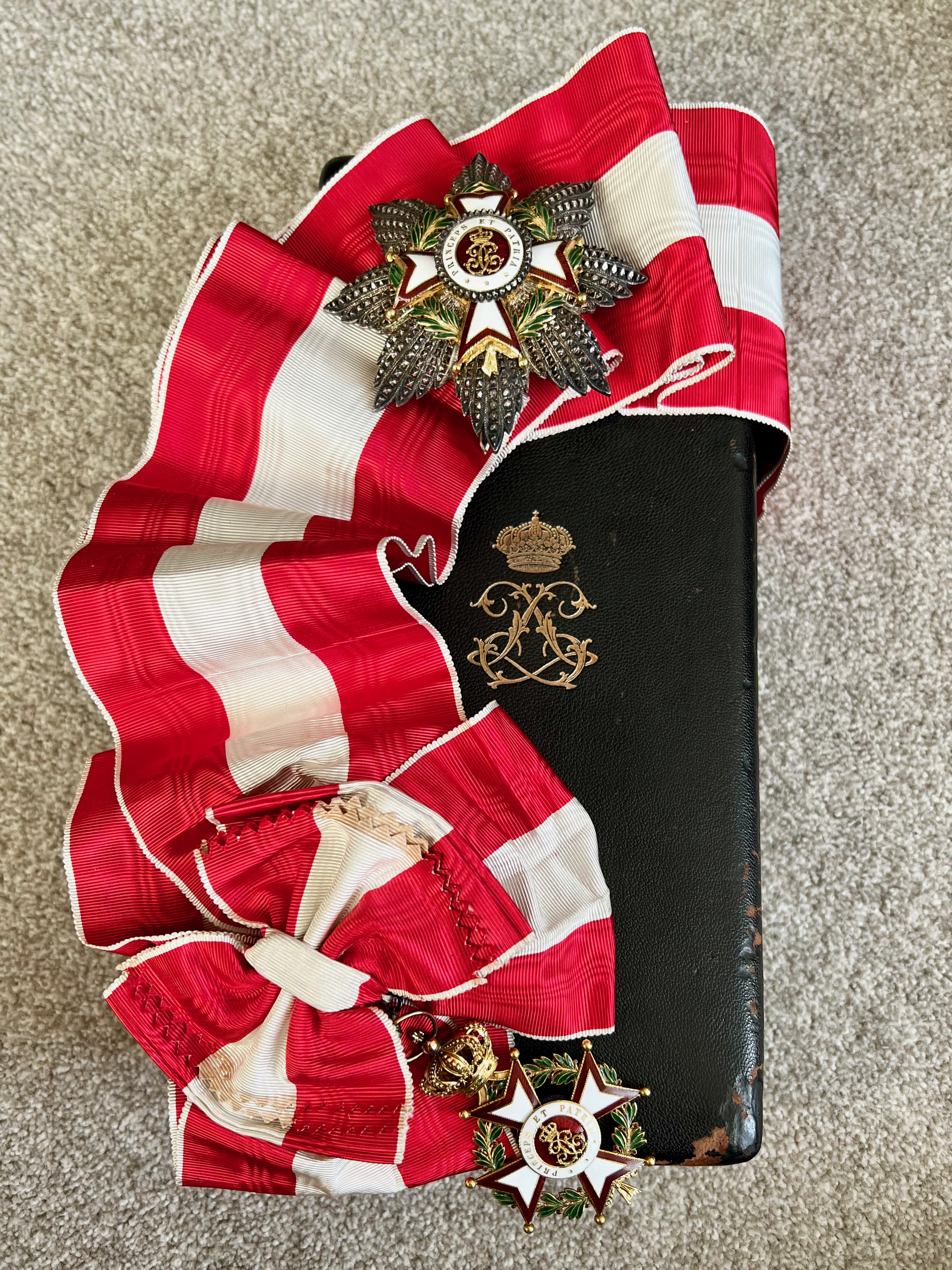
Grand Cross set of insignia.

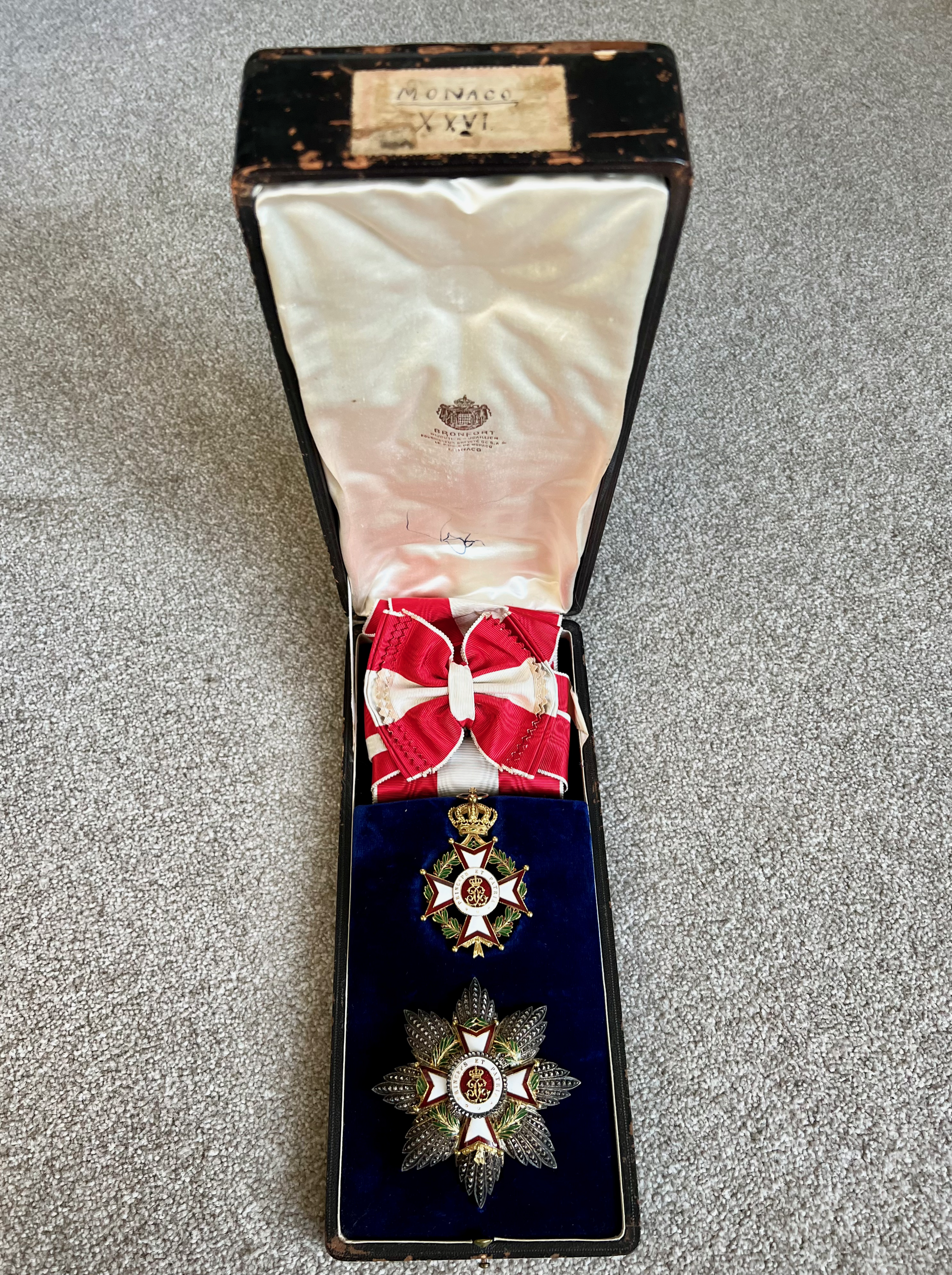
Grand Cross in case of issue.

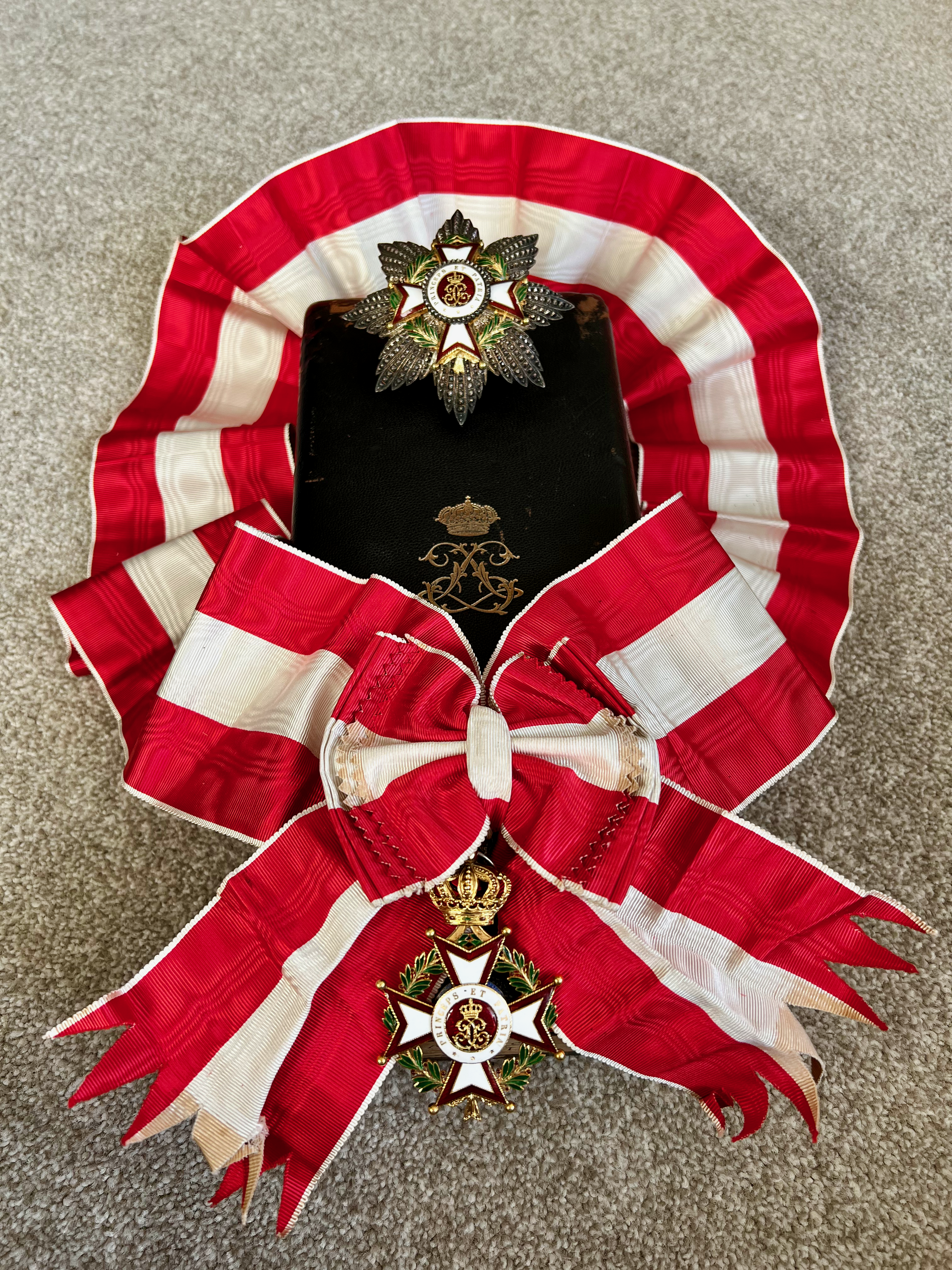
Grand Cross set.

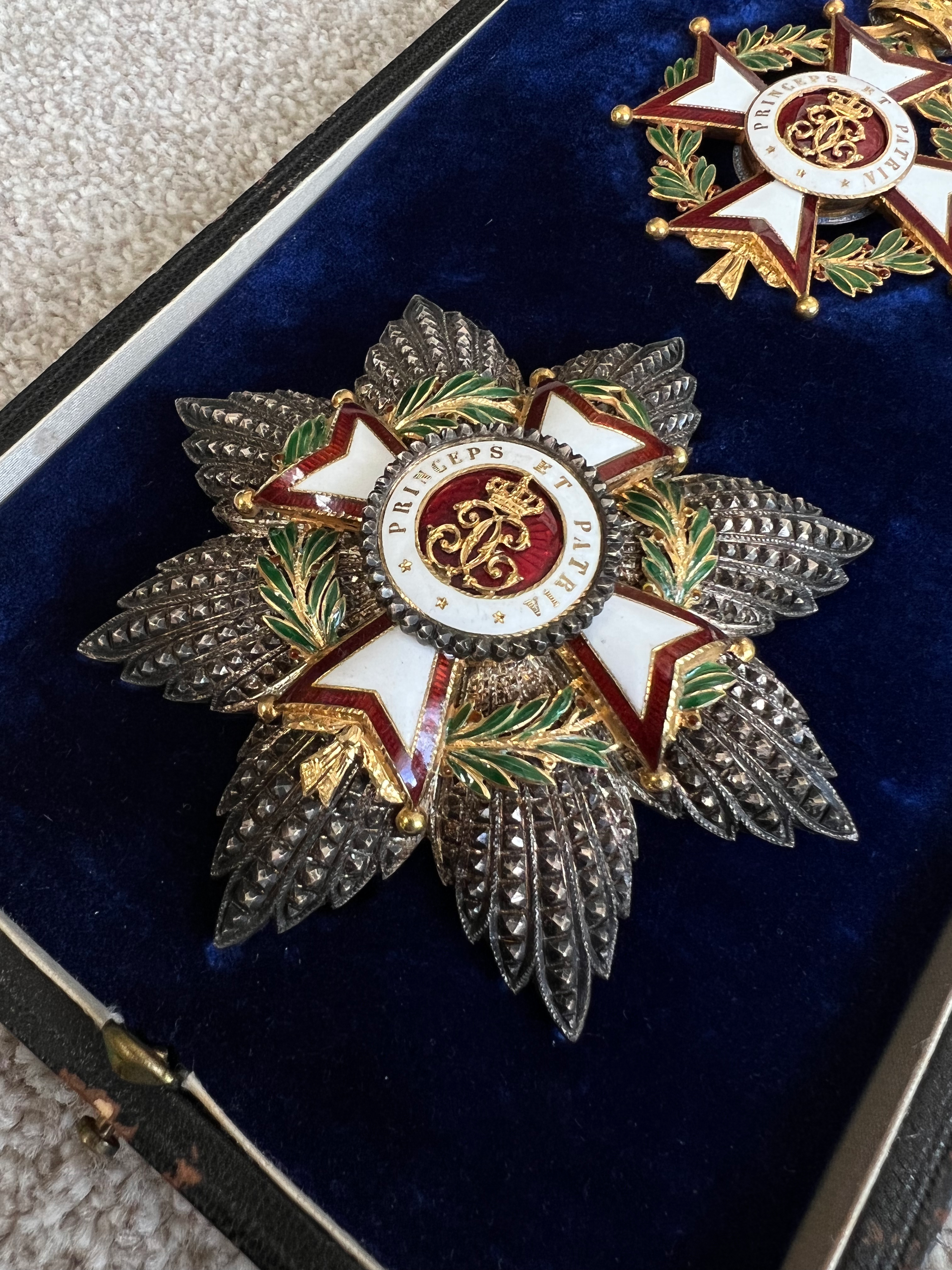
Breast Star of the Order.

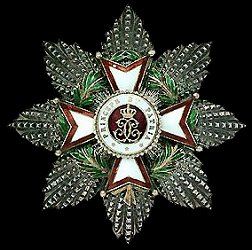
Breast Star of the Order.

== See also ==
- Coat of arms of Monaco#Exterior
