= Gianfranco Terenzi =

Sammarinese politician (1941–2020)

Captain Regent of San Marino
- In office 1 October 2014 – 1 April 2015 Serving with Guerrino Zanotti
- Preceded by: Luca Beccari; Valeria Ciavatta
- Succeeded by: Andrea Belluzzi; Roberto Venturini
- In office 1 April 2006 – 1 October 2006; Served with Loris Francini
- Preceded by: Antonello Bacciocchi; Claudio Muccioli
- Succeeded by: Antonio Carattoni; Roberto Giorgetti
- In office 1 October 2000 – 1 April 2001; Served with Enzo Colombini
- Preceded by: Gian Marco Marcucci; Maria Domenica Michelotti
- Succeeded by: Fabio Berardi; Luigi Lonfernini
- In office 1 October 1987 – 1 April 1988; Served with Rossano Zafferani
- Preceded by: Carlo Franciosi; Renzo Renzi
- Succeeded by: Umberto Barulli; Rosolino Martelli

Personal details
- Born: 2 January 1941 San Marino, San Marino
- Died: 20 May 2020 (aged 79) Serravalle, San Marino
- Party: Christian Democratic Party

Gianfranco Terenzi (2 January 1941 – 20 May 2020) was a Sammarinese politician who served as captain regent on four occasions. He was a member of the Sammarinese Christian Democratic Party.

His first term was with Rossano Zafferani (October 1987–April 1988). His second term was with Enzo Colombini from (October 2000–April 2001). His third term was with Loris Francini from April 2006 to October 2006. His fourth term was with Guerrino Zanotti (October 2014–April 2015).

Terenzi died on 20 May 2020 after being hit by a truck, aged 79.
