= Roberto Giorgetti =

Sammarinese politician

Roberto Giorgetti (born 4 November 1962) became captain regent of San Marino on 1 October 2006 along with Antonio Carattoni. They held their positions until 1 April 2007. Giorgetti is a member of the Popular Alliance of Democrats and is the leader of that party.

Together, they replaced outgoing heads of government Gianfranco Terenzi and Loris Francini.

They were succeeded by Alessandro Mancini and Alessandro Rossi.
