= Alejandro Llorente y Lannas =

Spanish politician, writer, journalist and historian

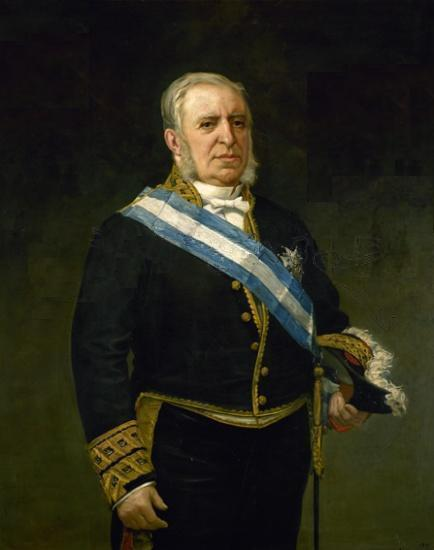
Alejandro Llorente

Alejandro Llorente y Lannas (1814 in Cádiz, Spain – 30 December 1901, in Madrid, Spain) was a Spanish politician, writer, journalist and historian who served as Minister of State in 1864, in a cabinet headed by Ramón María Narváez, 1st Duke of Valencia. He was a Knight of the Golden Fleece and Knight Grand Cross of the Order of Charles III.

== Sources ==
- Personal dossier of D. Alejandro LLorente. Spanish Senate

Political offices
Preceded by Joaquín Francisco Pacheco	Minister of State; 16 September 1864 – 10 December 1864	Succeeded by Antonio de Benavides
