= Massimo Andrea Ugolini =

Sammarinese politician

Secretary of State for Health, Social Security, Social Affairs and Equal Opportunities
- Incumbent
- Assumed office 20 July 2026
- Preceded by: Marco Gatti (interim)

Captain Regent of San Marino
- In office 1 April 2016 – 1 October 2016; Served with Gian Nicola Berti
- Preceded by: Lorella Stefanelli; Nicola Renzi
- Succeeded by: Marino Riccardi; Fabio Berardi

Secretary of State for Justice, Welfare and Family
- In office 8 January 2020 – 26 June 2024
- Preceded by: Nicola Renzi
- Succeeded by: Stefano Canti

Personal details
- Born: 26 July 1978 (age 48) City of San Marino, San Marino
- Party: Christian Democratic Party

Massimo Andrea Ugolini (born 26 July 1978) is a politician who served as a Captain Regent of San Marino (alongside Gian Nicola Berti). He was in office from 1 April 2016 to 1 October 2016 and is a member of the Sammarinese Christian Democratic Party.

From 20 July 2026 is serving as Secretary of State for Health and Social Security.
