= Gian Nicola Berti =

Sammarinese politician

Captain Regent of San Marino
- In office 1 April 2016 – 1 October 2016; Served with Massimo Andrea Ugolini
- Preceded by: Lorella Stefanelli; Nicola Renzi
- Succeeded by: Marino Riccardi; Fabio Berardi

Secretary of State for Internal Affairs, the Public Function, Institutional Affairs and Relations with Municipalities
- Incumbent
- Assumed office 28 June 2023

Personal details
- Born: 9 August 1960 (age 66) City of San Marino, San Marino
- Party: We Sammarinese

Gian Nicola Berti (born 9 August 1960) is a politician who served as a Captain Regent of San Marino (alongside Massimo Andrea Ugolini). He served from 1 April 2016 to 1 October 2016 and represented We Sammarinese.

Berti was first elected to the Grand and General Council in 2008. He is a lawyer by profession, and is married with two children. A shooting sportsman, he competed in the 1988 Seoul Olympics. His son, Gian Marco, represented San Marino in shooting at the 2020 Summer Olympics and won a silver medal.
