= Lorella Stefanelli =

Sammarinese politician

Captain Regent of San Marino
- In office 1 October 2015 – 1 April 2016; Served with Nicola Renzi
- Preceded by: Andrea Belluzzi; Roberto Venturini
- Succeeded by: Massimo Andrea Ugolini; Gian Nicola Berti

Personal details
- Born: 20 February 1959 (age 67) San Marino, San Marino
- Party: Christian Democratic Party
- Spouse: Silvano di Mario
- Children: 2
- Education: University of Bologna

Lorella Stefanelli (born 20 February 1959) is a Sammarinese politician who was Captain Regent of San Marino from October 2015 until April 2016 (alongside Nicola Renzi).

She is a lawyer and worked in the Sammarinese Department of Tourism. She graduated in law from Bologna University.
