= Marino Riccardi =

Sammarinese politician

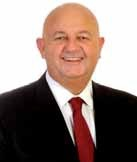

Captain Regent of San Marino
- In office 1 October 2016 – 1 April 2017; Served with Fabio Berardi
- Preceded by: Massimo Andrea Ugolini; Gian Nicola Berti
- Succeeded by: Mimma Zavoli; Vanessa D'Ambrosio
- In office 1 April 2004 – 1 October 2004; Served with Paolo Bollini
- Preceded by: Giovanni Lonfernini; Valeria Ciavatta
- Succeeded by: Giuseppe Arzilli; Roberto Raschi
- In office 1 October 1991 – 1 April 1992; Served with Edda Ceccoli
- Preceded by: Domenico Bernardini; Claudio Podeschi
- Succeeded by: Germano de Biagi; Ernesto Benedettini

Personal details
- Born: 9 July 1958 (age 68)
- Party: Party of Socialists and Democrats
- Children: 1 (Dalibor)
- Occupation: Politician

Marino Riccardi (born 9 July 1958) is a politician from the nation of San Marino. He is a member of the Party of Democrats. He has been a captain-regent three times, from October 1991 to April 1992, from April 2004 until October 2004, and from October 2016 to April 2017.
