= Guerrino Zanotti =

Sammarinese politician

Captain Regent of San Marino
- In office 1 October 2014 – 1 April 2015 Serving with Gianfranco Terenzi
- Preceded by: Luca Beccari; Valeria Ciavatta
- Succeeded by: Andrea Belluzzi; Roberto Venturini

Personal details
- Born: 24 October 1962 (age 63) City of San Marino, San Marino
- Party: Party of Socialists and Democrats

Guerrino Zanotti (born 15 August 1964) is a Sammarinese politician who served as a Captain Regent with Gianfranco Terenzi, from October 2014 to April 2015. He is also a member of the Grand and General Council. Zanotti has been a member of the Party of Socialists and Democrats since it was formed in 2005. He is married and has two sons. In 2016, Zanotti was re-elected to the Grand and General Council, and he became the Secretary of State for Internal Affairs.
