= Giovanni Lonfernini =

Captain Regent of San Marino

Captain Regent of San Marino
- In office 1 October 2003 – 1 March 2004; Served with Valeria Ciavatta
- Preceded by: Pier Marino Menicucci; Giovanni Giannoni
- Succeeded by: Paolo Bollini; Marino Riccardi

Political Secretary of the Sammarinese Christian Democratic Party
- In office April 2002 – February 2005
- President: Cesare Gasperoni
- Succeeded by: Pier Marino Menicucci

Additional positions
- 2005-2006: Secretary for Culture
- 1993-2014: Member of the Grand and General Council

Personal details
- Born: 2 October 1976 (age 49) City of San Marino, San Marino
- Party: Sammarinese Christian Democratic Party

Giovanni Lonfernini (born 2 October 1976) was captain regent of San Marino for the semester from October 2003 to March 2004. He is a member of the Sammarinese Christian Democratic Party, and his co-captain-regent was Valeria Ciavatta.

Lonfernini was the second captain regent of this name, the previous one having served in 1934, 1937, and 1941; see List of Captains Regent of San Marino.
