= Joaquín de Roncali, 1st Marquis of Roncali =

Spanish diplomat (1811–1875)

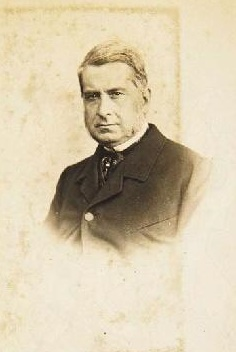
Joaquín de Roncali, 1st Marquis of Roncali

Don Joaquín Roncali y Ceruti, 1st Marquis of Roncali, Grandee of Spain (8 September 1811 in Cádiz, Spain – 6 February 1875 in Madrid, Spain) was a Spanish noble and politician who served as Minister of Grace and Justice and as Minister of State in the last years of the reign of Isabella II. Roncaly ceased in his post because of the Spanish Glorious Revolution, which deposed the Queen.

Roncali was the eldest son of Agustín de Roncali y Martínez de Murcia, Knight of Santiago, and his wife María del Carmen Ceruti y Feit. His younger brother was the prominent politician Federico de Roncali, 1st Count of Alcoy. Among other honours, Roncali was appointed Knight Collar of the Order of Charles III, Knight Grand Cross of the Orders of Isabella the Catholic, Pius IX, Christ of Portugal, the Crown of Prussia and Saint Januarius. On 14 May 1867, Roncali was granted the Marquisate of Roncali by the Queen, and on 6 August 1868, his title received the Grandeeship of Spain.

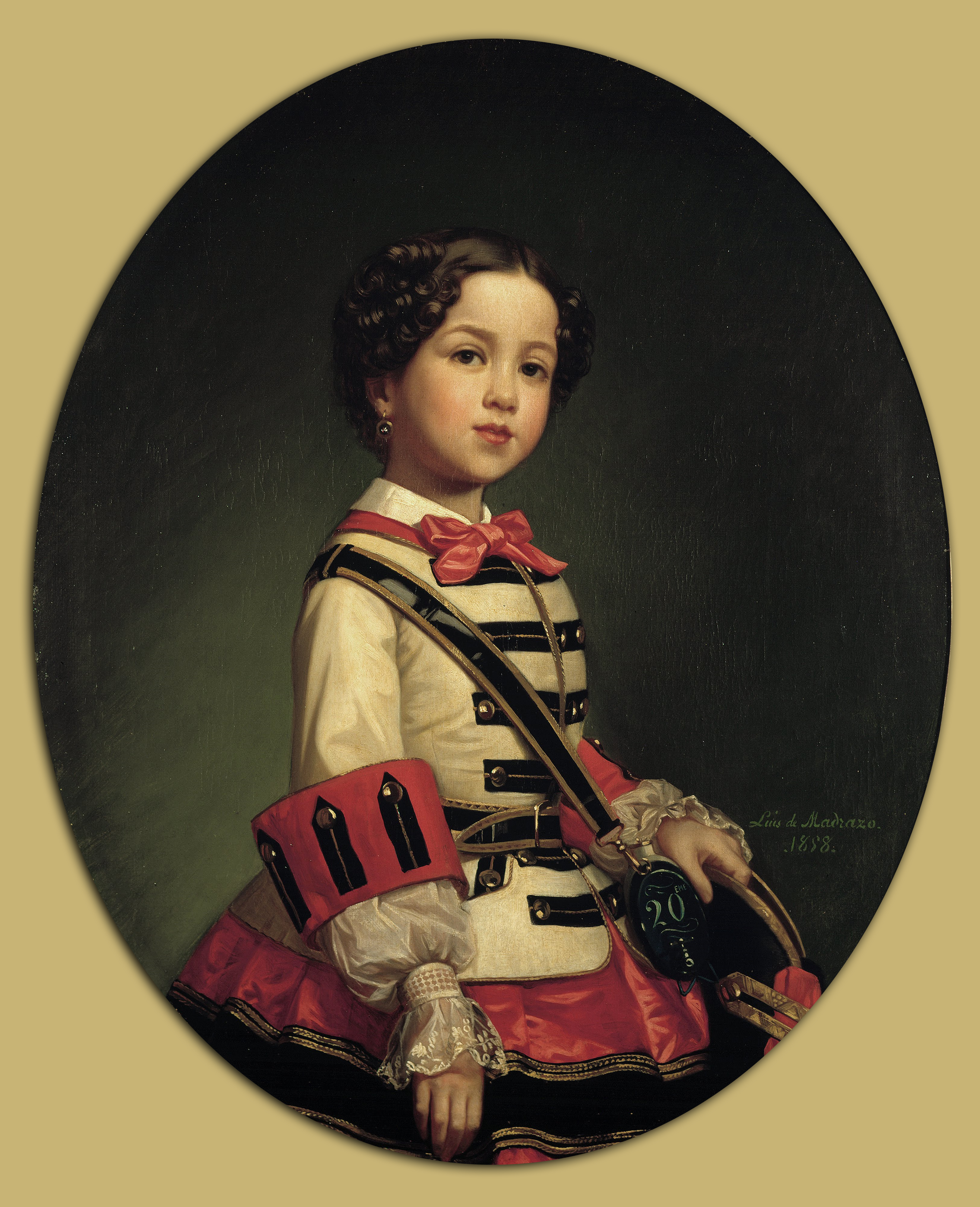
Roncali's daughter María Cristina as a girl (1858)

He married in 1850 María Dolores de Gaviria y Gutiérrez, daughter of the Count and the Countess of Casa Gaviria, and had a single daughter Doña María Cristina de Roncali, 2nd Marquise of Roncali (1851–1928, pictured right).

Political offices
Preceded by Lorenzo Arrazola	Minister of State; 23 April 1868 – 20 September 1868	Succeeded by Juan Álvarez de Lorenzana
