= Antonio de Benavides y Fernández de Navarrete =

Spanish noble, historian and kind

The Most Excellent Antonio de Benavides
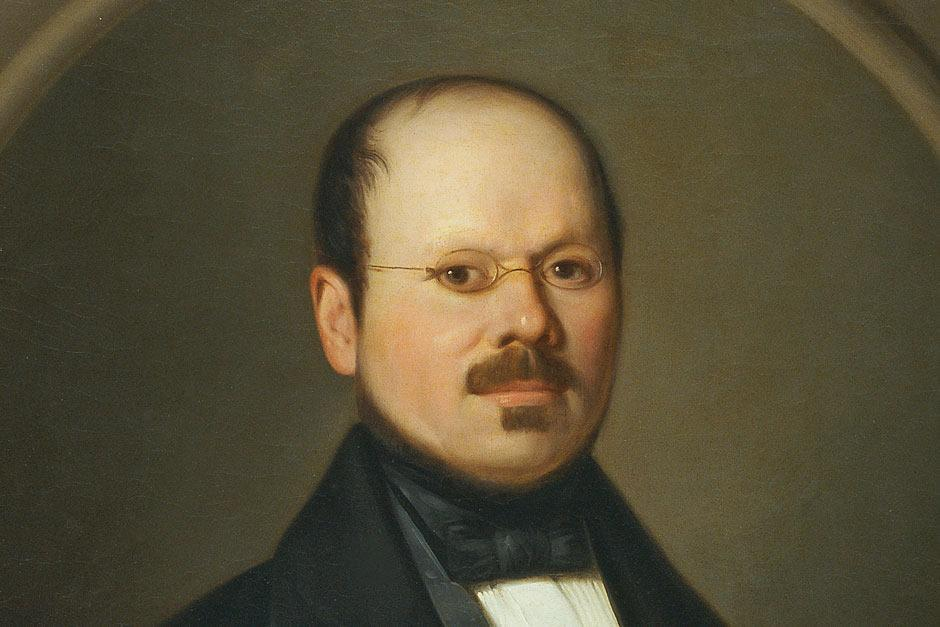

Minister of State
- In office 8 June 1865 – 21 June 1865
- Monarch: Isabella II
- Prime Minister: Ramón María Narváez
- Preceded by: Alejandro Llorente
- Succeeded by: Lorenzo Arrazola (acting)

Seat C of the Real Academia Española
- In office 24 November 1872 – 23 January 1884
- Preceded by: Luis González Bravo
- Succeeded by: Cristino Martos y Balbí (Note: Martos was elected for the position in 1884 but never took the seat)

Personal details
- Born: Antonio de Benavides y Fernández de Navarrete; 20 June 1807 Baeza, Spain
- Died: 23 January 1884 (aged 76) Madrid, Spain

Antonio de Benavides y Fernández de Navarrete (20 June 1807, in Baeza, Spain – 23 January 1884, in Madrid, Spain) was a Spanish noble and historian who served as Minister of State between 1864 and 1865, in the reign of Queen Isabella II of Spain.

Benavides was the eldest son of Manuel de Benavides y Rodríguez-Zambrano, Major of the Hermandad for the noble state in 1808, and his wife Francisca de Paula Fernández de Navarrete y Motilla. Among other honors, he was Knight of Santiago and Knight Grand Cross of the Order of Isabella the Catholic.

== Sources ==
- Cadenas y Vicent, Vicente de, Knights of the Order of Santiago in the 19th Century. Madrid, Hidalguía, 1992. (in Spanish)
- Antonio de Benavides. Geneall.net
- Personal dossier of D. Antonio de Benavide y Fernández de Navarrete. Spanish Senate

Political offices
| Preceded by Alejandro Llorente | Minister of State; 8 June 1865 – 21 June 1865 | Succeeded by Lorenzo Arrazola; Acting |
