= Edda Ceccoli =

Sammarinese politician

Edda Ceccolli

Captain Regent of San Marino
- In office 1 October 1991 – 1 April 1992; Served with Marino Riccardi
- Preceded by: Domenico Bernardini; Claudio Podeschi
- Succeeded by: Germano De Biagi; Ernesto Benedettini

Personal details
- Born: 26 June 1947 (age 79)
- Party: Christian Democratic Party

Edda Ceccoli (born 26 June 1947) was Captain Regent of San Marino from 1 October 1991 to 1 April 1992. She served as co-Regent with Marino Riccardi. She has been elected to two five-year terms in the Great and Good Council. She is a member of Partito Democratico Cristano Sammarinese.

From 2000 to 2002 she was Particular Secretary of the Secretary of State of Health.
