= Valeria Ciavatta =

Sammarinese politician (b. 1959)

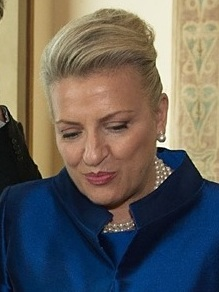

Captain Regent of San Marino
- In office 1 April 2014 – 1 October 2014; Served with Luca Beccari
- Preceded by: Gian Carlo Capicchioni; Anna Maria Muccioli
- Succeeded by: Gianfranco Terenzi; Guerrino Zanotti
- In office 1 October 2003 – 1 April 2004; Served with Giovanni Lonfernini
- Preceded by: Giovanni Giannoni; Pier Marino Menicucci
- Succeeded by: Paolo Bollini; Marino Riccardi

Personal details
- Born: 16 January 1959 (age 67) Borgo Maggiore, San Marino
- Party: Christian Democratic Party (Before 1993); Popular Alliance (1993–2017)
- Education: University of Urbino

Valeria Ciavatta (born 16 January 1959) is a Sammarinese politician, who was a co-captain-regent (joint head of state) of San Marino along with Luca Beccari for the semester of April to September 2014. She is a member of the Popular Alliance of Democrats.

== Political history ==
Ciavatta was co-captain-regent alongside Giovanni Lonfernini from October 2003 to March 2004. On 27 July 2006, she became the interior minister of San Marino. She was a Christian Democrat for many years, before becoming a founding member of the Popular Alliance in the early 1990s.

== Honors ==
- Order of Merit of the Italian Republic (Italy, 2014)
