= Antonio Carattoni =

Sammarinese politician (1945–2026)

Antonio Carattoni (8 November 1945 – 4 or 5 November 2026) was a Sammarinese politician. He became Captain Regent of San Marino on 1 October 2006 along with Roberto Giorgetti. He held that office until 1 April 2007. Carattoni was a member of the Party of Socialists and Democrats. Carattoni was born on 8 November 1945. He died in November 2026, at the age of 80.
