= Roberto Venturini =

Sammarinese politician (born 1960)

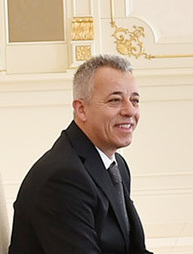

Captain Regent of San Marino
- In office 1 April 2015 – 1 October 2015 Serving with Andrea Belluzzi
- Preceded by: Gianfranco Terenzi; Guerrino Zanotti
- Succeeded by: Nicola Renzi; Lorella Stefanelli

Personal details
- Born: 30 December 1960 (age 65) City of San Marino, San Marino
- Party: Christian Democratic Party
- Education: University of Bologna

Roberto Venturini (born 30 December 1960) is a Sammarinese politician who served as a Captain Regent with Andrea Belluzzi, from April to October 2015. He was first elected to the Grand and General Council in 2012 as a Christian Democrat. He lives in Serravalle and has two children.
