= Villanueva de Campeán =

Coordinates: 41°21′N 5°46′W

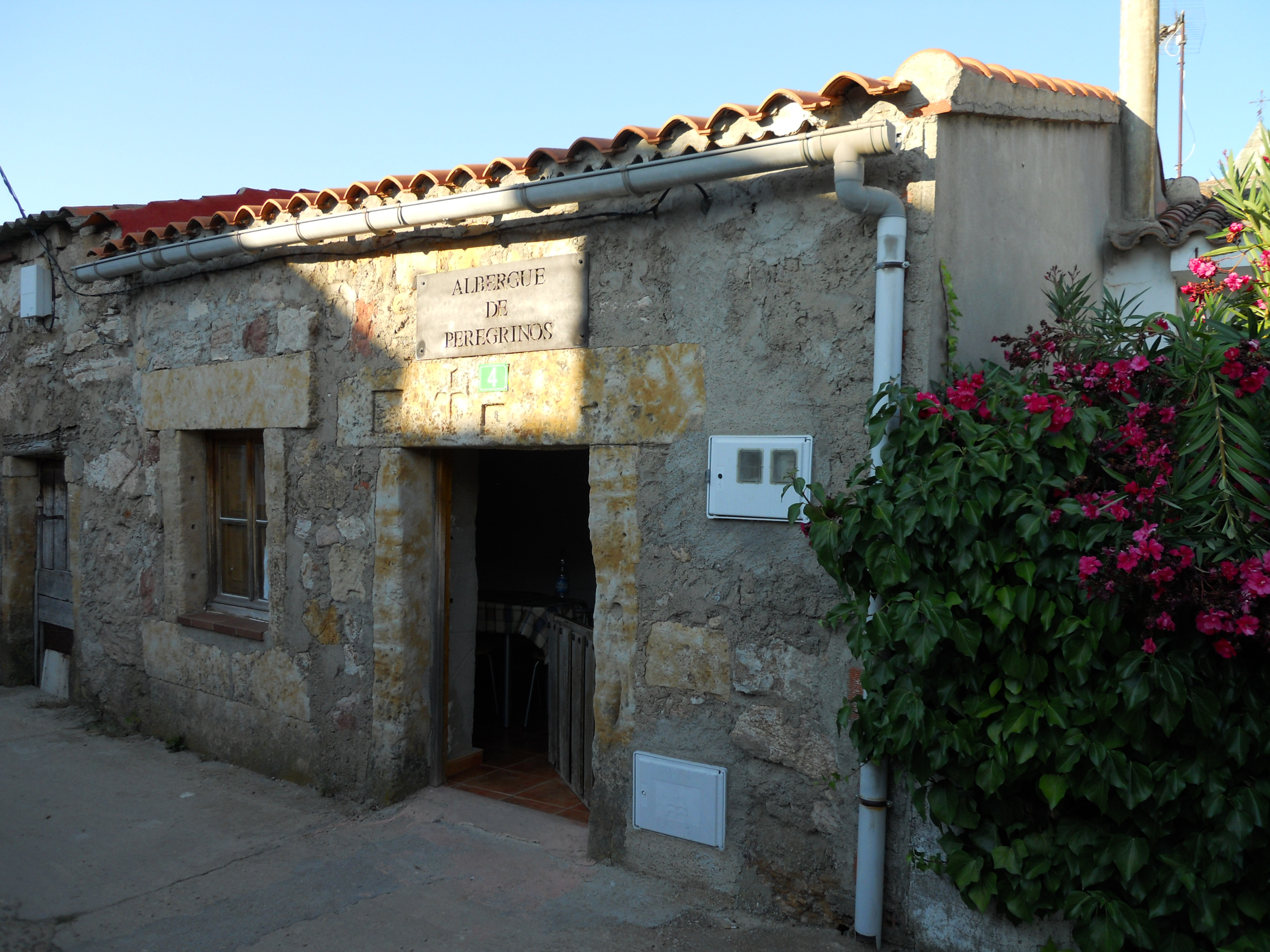
- Interactive map of Villanueva de Campeán
- Country: Spain
- Autonomous community: Castile and León
- Province: Zamora
- Municipality: Villanueva de Campeán

Area
  - Total: 12 km^{2} (4.6 sq mi)

Population (2025-01-01)
  - Total: 115
  - Density: 9.6/km^{2} (25/sq mi)
- Time zone: UTC+1 (CET)
  - Summer (DST): UTC+2 (CEST)
- Website: Official website

Villanueva de Campeán (Spanish pronunciation: [biʎaˈnweβa ðe kampeˈan]) is a municipality located in the province of Zamora, Castile and León, Spain. According to the 2004 census (INE), the municipality has a population of 168 inhabitants.
