= Checa =

Checa, Spain
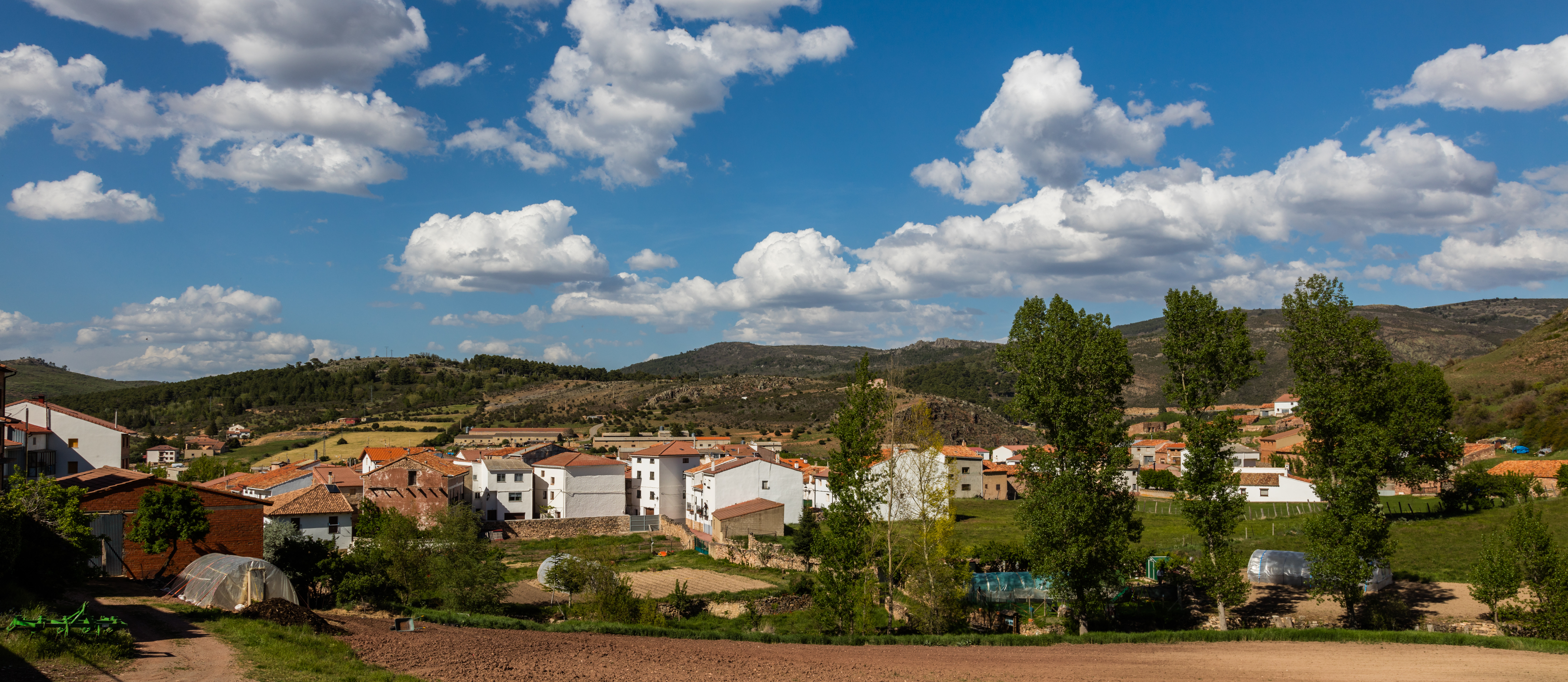

- Coat of arms

- Location within Province of Guadalajara Location within Castilla-La Mancha Location within Spain
- Country: Spain
- Autonomous community: Castile-La Mancha
- Province: Guadalajara
- Municipality: Checa

Area
  - Total: 179 km^{2} (69 sq mi)

Population (2025-01-01)
  - Total: 268
  - Density: 1.50/km^{2} (3.88/sq mi)
- Time zone: UTC+1 (CET)
  - Summer (DST): UTC+2 (CEST)

Checa (Spanish: [ˈtʃeka]) is a municipality located in the province of Guadalajara, Castile-La Mancha, Spain. According to the 2004 census (INE), the municipality has a population of 364 inhabitants.
