= Loris Francini =

Sammarinese politician

Loris Francini (born 12 August 1962) is a Sammarinese politician.

Francini was Captain Regent with Alberto Cecchetti from April 1998 to October 1998. He served as captain-regent for a second term with Gianfranco Terenzi from 1 April 2006 to 1 October 2006. He is a member of the Sammarinese Christian Democratic Party.
