= Manuel Bermúdez de Castro y Díez =

Spanish economist and politician

Don Manuel Bermúdez de Castro y Díez (11 June 1811, in Jerez de la Frontera, Spain – 11 March 1870, in Madrid, Spain) was a Spanish economist and politician who served as Minister of Spain between 1865 and 1866, in a unionist cabinet headed by Leopoldo O'Donnell, 1st Duke of Tetuan.

Manuel was the first son of José Bermúdez de Castro y Blasco and María de los Dolores Díez e Imbrechst. He married in Madrid, on 21 July 1860, María de la Encarnación O'Lawlor y Caballero, daughter of the Irishman Joseph O'Lawlor and Dionisia Caballero y Crooke. They had a single son:

- Don Salvador Bermúdez de Castro, 2nd Duke of Ripalda (1863–1946), who inherited the Dukedom of Ripalda and the Marquisate of Lema from Manuel's younger brother Salvador Bermúdez de Castro, 1st Duke of Ripalda.

Political offices
Preceded by Lorenzo Arrazola; Acting	Minister of State; 21 June 1865 – 10 July 1866	Succeeded by Lorenzo Arrazola; Acting
