= Andrea Belluzzi =

Sammarinese politician

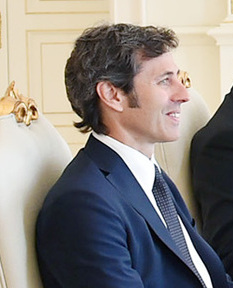

Captain Regent of San Marino
- In office 1 April 2015 – 1 October 2015 Serving with Roberto Venturini
- Preceded by: Gianfranco Terenzi; Guerrino Zanotti
- Succeeded by: Nicola Renzi; Lorella Stefanelli

Personal details
- Born: 23 March 1968 (age 58) San Marino
- Party: Party of Socialists and Democrats

Andrea Belluzzi (born 23 March 1968) is a Sammarinese politician who served as a Captain Regent with Roberto Venturini, from April to October 2015. He was previously a member of the Grand and General Council. He works as a lawyer, is married, and has a son.
