= Order of the Crown (Monaco) =

Monégasque order

Order of the Crown Ordre de la Couronne
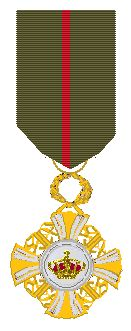
- Knight's insignia

Awarded by Prince of Monaco
- Type: House Order
- Eligibility: Citizens of Monaco and foreigners
- Awarded for: People who have done something exceptional or by their exceptional conduct
- Status: Currently constituted
- Grand Master: Albert II, Prince of Monaco
- Chancellor: Raoul Biancheri, Plenipotentiary Minister
- Grades: Knight-Grand Cross, Grand Officer, Commander, Officer, Knight

Precedence
- Next (higher): Order of Saint Charles
- Next (lower): Order of Grimaldi
- Ribbon bar of the Order of the Crown

The Order of the Crown (French: Ordre de la Couronne; Monégasque: U̍rdine d’a Curuna) is an order established in Monaco on 20 July 1960. This decoration is awarded to people who have done something exceptional or for their exceptional conduct.

== Award ==
It is awarded to people with high merit by the Grand Master, currently Albert II, Prince of Monaco.

=== Reception ===
According to the statutes, and except for Members of the Princely Family and foreigners, one can only receive the Order first with the rank of Knight. To be awarded the following higher ranks, one must hold the lower rank for a set number of years. To be promoted to Officer, one must serve four years as a knight, promotion from Officer to Commander is three years, Commander to Grand Officer is four years, and finally promotion from Grand Officer to Knight-Grand Cross requires a period of five years.

Nominations to the order belong to the Grand Master. The Chancellor proposes promotions. According to the Prince's orders, the Chancellor proposes the projects of nomination and promotion ordonnances. The grantees must be received in the Order before wearing the decorations. The Grand Master receives the Grand Crosses, Grand Officers and Commanders. The Chancellor receives the Officers and Knights. The exception being that foreigners will be admitted in the Order, but not received.

=== Military honors ===
Members of the Order who are wearing their decorations are entitled to receive military honours from the Compagnie des Carabiniers du Prince. Officers and Knights are honoured by the execution of the command "Port, ARMS" (Portez, Armes). For Knight-Grand Crosses, Grand Officers and Commanders, they are honoured by the execution of the command "Present, ARMS" (Présentez, Armes).

== Grades ==
The order is composed of five grades:

- Knight-Grand Cross. Badge hanging from the sash worn from the right shoulder to the left hip and breast star on the left chest.
- Grand Officer. Badge hanging from a necklet and breast star on the left chest
- Commander. Badge hanging from a necklet
- Officer. Badge hanging from a ribbon with rosette
- Knight. Badge hanging from a ribbon

== Insignia ==
The badge of the order is a cross pattée with fluted arms of silver and a central gold stripe. Between each set of arms of the cross is the monogram of the order's founder Rainier III, in gold. The medallion in the center of the cross bears a prince's crown. On the reverse of the badge the medallion bears the lozengy arms of Monaco and the House of Grimaldi. The badge is mounted by an oak and laurel wreath.

The star of the order is identical to the badge, but lacks the wreath for mounting. Additionally, the center medallion is surrounded by a ring of lozenges.

The ribbon of the order is olive green with a central red stripe.

Ribbon bars
Knight-Grand Cross	Grand Officer	Commander	Officer	Knight

== Recipients ==
- Princess Benedikte of Denmark
- Princess Charlotte, Duchess of Valentinois

=== Grand Masters ===
- Albert II, Prince of Monaco
- Rainier III, Prince of Monaco
