= Paolo Bollini =

Sammarinese politician (born 1960)

member of the Sammarinese Socialist Party

Personal details
- Born: 1960 (age 65–66)
- Occupation: Politician

Paolo Bollini (born 1960) is a Sammarinese politician. He is a member of the Sammarinese Socialist Party. He has been a captain regent twice, from October 1998 until April 1999 and from April 2004 until October 2004.
