= Ludwig Hoffmann-Rumerstein =

Austrian Roman Catholic lawyer (1937–2022)

Fra' Ludwig Hoffmann-Rumerstein
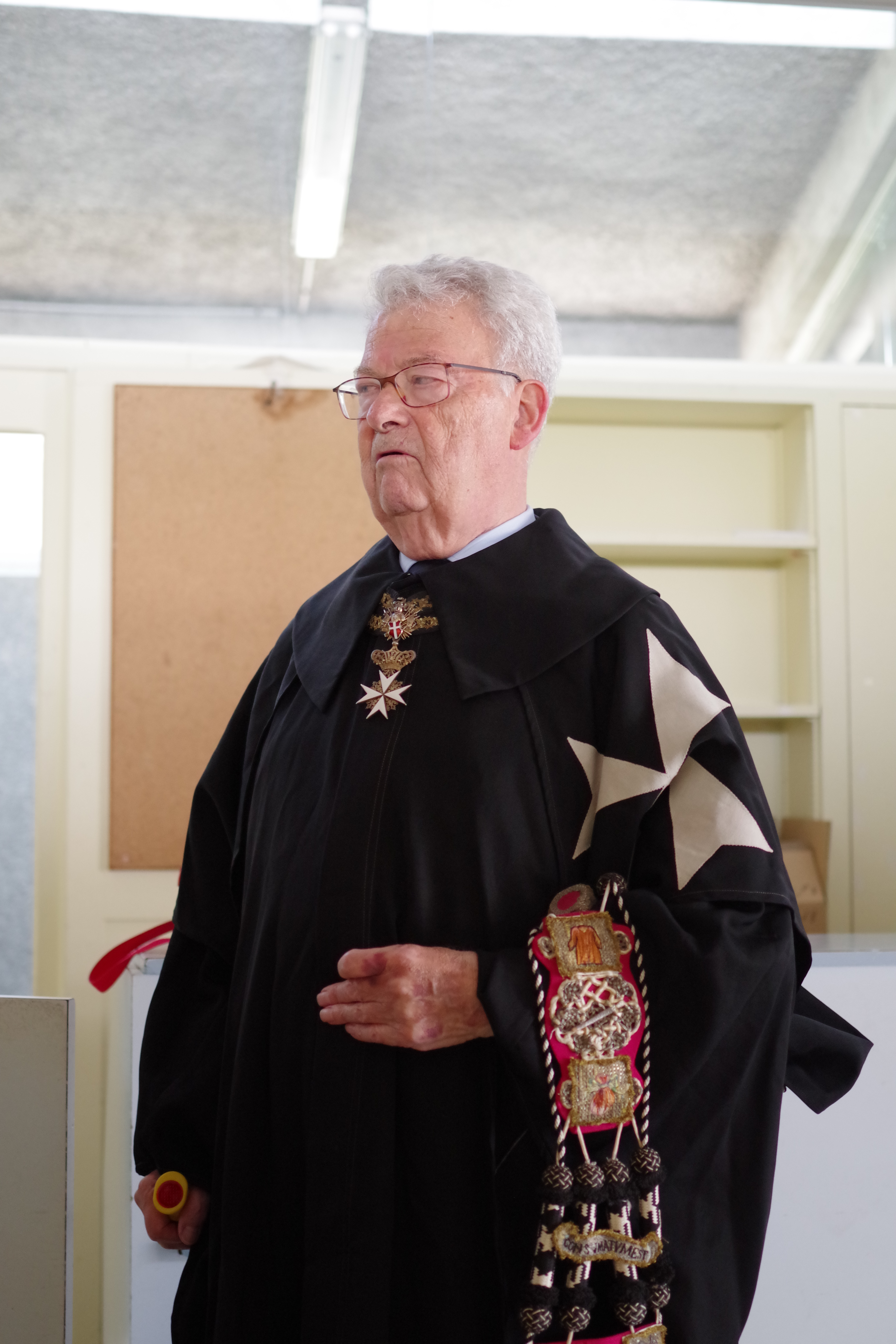
- Hoffmann-Rumerstein in 2018

Grand Commander of the Sovereign Military Order of Malta
- In office 31 May 2014 – 1 May 2019
- Monarchs: Matthew Festing; Giacomo dalla Torre
- Preceded by: Carlo d'Ippolito di Sant'Ippolito
- Succeeded by: Ruy Gonçalo do Valle Peixoto de Villas Boas
- In office 1994–2004
- Monarch: Andrew Bertie
- Preceded by: Matthew Festing
- Succeeded by: Giacomo dalla Torre

Lieutenant ad interim of the Sovereign Military Order of Malta
- In office 28 January 2017 – 30 April 2017
- Preceded by: Matthew Festing
- Succeeded by: Giacomo dalla Torre

Personal details
- Born: Ludwig Franz Xaver Irenäus Joseph Peter Raimund Maria Hoffmann von Rumerstein; 21 January 1937; Innsbruck, Tyrol, Federal State of Austria
- Died: 13 December 2022 (aged 85); Innsbruck, Tyrol, Austria
- Education: University of Innsbruck; Pontifical Gregorian University

Fra' Ludwig Franz Xaver Irenäus Joseph Peter Raimund Maria Hoffmann von Rumerstein (Austrian German: [ˈluːdvɪɡ ˈhɔfman fɔn ˈruːmɐʃtaɪn]; born 21 January 1937 – 13 December 2022) was an Austrian Grand Commander of the Sovereign Military Order of Malta. He was acting head of the order for some months in 2017.

== Early life ==
Hoffmann-Rumerstein was the son of Ernst Hoffmann von Rumerstein and of his wife, Baroness Pia Riccabona von Reichenfels.

Hoffmann-Rumerstein studied law at the University of Innsbruck graduating in 1962. He then studied philosophy at the Pontifical Gregorian University. After he completed his military service, he practised as a lawyer in Innsbruck from 1970 to 2002.

== Order of Malta ==
Hoffmann-Rumerstein’s work with the Sovereign Military Order of Malta began as a volunteer. In 1968, he co-founded the Order’s Austrian volunteer corps in North Tyrol. In 1970, he joined the Order as a Knight of Honour and Devotion. From 1971 to 1979 he led the Order’s group of volunteers in Innsbruck. From 1979 to 1986 he was a member of the board of directors of the Malteser Hospitaldienst Austria (de).

In 1984, Hoffmann-Rumerstein took vows as a Knight of Justice. That same year he was elected a member of the Order’s Sovereign Council. He served as Grand Commander of the Order from 1994 to 2004. He was re-elected Grand Commander in 2014.

From the end of January until the end of April 2017, Hoffmann-Rumerstein was the acting head of the Order, as Lieutenant ad interim, after the resignation of Fra' Matthew Festing as Prince and Grand Master. He retained this office until 29 April 2017, when the Complete Council of State elected Fra' Giacomo dalla Torre del Tempio di Sanguinetto as Lieutenant of the Grand Master for a period of one year.

== Personal life and death ==
Hoffmann-Rumerstein died in Innsbruck, Tyrol on 13 December 2022, at the age of 85.

== Honours ==
- 1989: Grand Decoration of Honour in Silver with Sash of the Republic of Austria
- 1990: Grand Officer of the Order of Merit of the Italian Republic
- 1994: Grand Decoration of Honour in Gold with Sash of the Republic of Austria
- 1994: Grand Cross of the Order of Merit of the Italian Republic
- 1998: Order of the White Double Cross, 2nd Class, of the Republic of Slovakia
- 1999: Order of the Lithuanian Grand Duke Gediminas
- 2009: Grand Cross of the Order of Merit of the Republic of Hungary
- 2000: Honorary Companion with Breast Star of the National Order of Merit (Malta)
- 2004: Decoration of Honour of the State of Tyrol
- 2016: Grand Cross of the Order of the Star of Romania
- Grand Cross of the Order of Pope Pius IX
- Grand Officer of the Legion of Honour

Political offices
Preceded by Matthew Festing	Grand Commander of the Sovereign Military Order of Malta; 1994–2004	Succeeded by Giacomo dalla Torre
Preceded by Carlo d'Ippolito di Sant'Ippolito	Grand Commander of the Sovereign Military Order of Malta; 2014–2019	Succeeded by Ruy de Villas Boas
Catholic Church titles
Preceded by Matthew Festing	Grand Master of the Sovereign Military Order of Malta; Acting; 2017	Succeeded by Giacomo dalla Torre
