= Giacomo dalla Torre del Tempio di Sanguinetto =

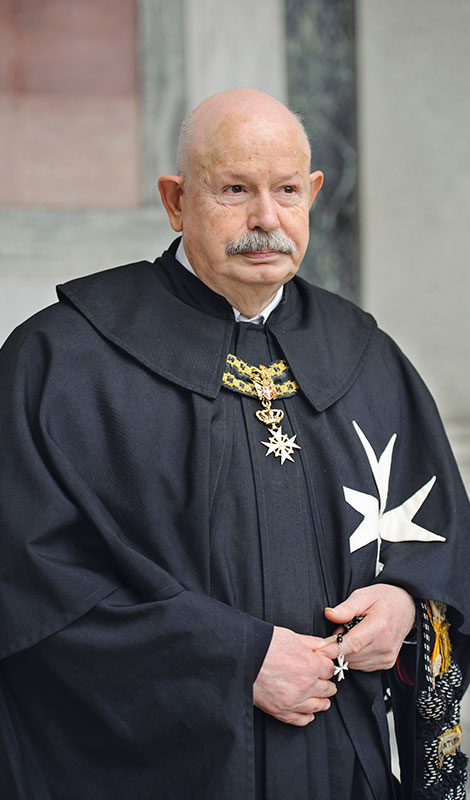
- Dalla Torre in 2017

Prince and Grand Master of the Sovereign Military Order of Malta
- Reign: 3 May 2018 – 29 April 2020 (Acting: 30 April 2017 – 3 May 2018)
- Predecessor: Ludwig von Rumerstein
- Successor: Ruy Gonçalo do Valle Peixoto de Villas Boas (acting)
- Grand Commander: Ludwig von Rumerstein
- Reign: 7 February 2008 – 11 March 2008 (acting)
- Predecessor: Andrew Bertie
- Successor: Matthew Festing

Grand Commander of the Sovereign Military Order of Malta
- Reign: 2 June 2004 – 12 February 2009
- Predecessor: Ludwig von Rumerstein
- Successor: Gherardo Hercolani Fava Simonetti
- Grand Masters: Andrew Bertie; Matthew Festing
- Born: 9 December 1944; Rome, Kingdom of Italy
- Died: 29 April 2020 (aged 75); Rome, Italy
- Burial: 5 May 2020; Santa Maria del Priorato Church, Rome
- Father: Paolo dalla Torre, Count of Sanguinetto
- Mother: Antonietta Pulvirenti De Grazia

Fra' Giacomo dalla Torre del Tempio di Sanguinetto (9 December 1944 – 29 April 2020) was the Prince and 80th Grand Master of the Sovereign Military Order of Malta from 2018 until his death in 2020. Born in Rome to a noble family with extensive ties to the Vatican, he completed his studies at the Sapienza University of Rome and taught at the Pontifical Urban University. He joined the Order in 1985 and took full vows in 1993 to become a Knight of Justice. Dalla Torre served two separate stints as interim leader of the Order, from February to March 2008 and again from 2017 until 2018, when he was elected Grand Master of the Order. During his time in office, he endeavoured to repair the Order's relations with the Vatican, which had been strained since Pope Francis ordered his predecessor to resign.

== Family and personal life ==
Dalla Torre was born in Rome (part of the Kingdom of Italy at the time) on 9 December 1944, to a noble comital family that was originally from Treviso and has a strong affiliation with the Holy See. His father – Paolo dalla Torre, 3rd Count of Sanguinetto – was an art historian and Director General of the Vatican Museums from 1961 to 1975. His mother was Antonietta Pulvirenti De Grazia. His brother, Giuseppe dalla Torre, a lawyer, was the President of the Tribunal of the Vatican City State, and was formerly Lieutenant General of the Order of the Holy Sepulchre. His grandfather Giuseppe Dalla Torre, a journalist, was the editor-in-chief of the Vatican newspaper L'Osservatore Romano from 1920 to 1960. Furthermore, when Pope Benedict XVI was still a cardinal, he once entrusted his cat to dalla Torre's care while he was away from the Vatican.

Dalla Torre studied Christian archeology and art history at the Sapienza University of Rome. He held academic posts at the Pontifical Urban University, where he taught classical Greek and served as its Chief Librarian and Archivist. He published several academic writings on medieval art history and was an expert in the field. He was also a musical enthusiast, particularly for Italian opera. His knowledge of music was described by Times of Malta as "prodigious".

== Order of Malta ==
=== Knight ===
Dalla Torre became a Knight of Honour and Devotion of the Sovereign Military Order of Malta (SMOM) in 1985 and took solemn vows of poverty, chastity and obedience as a Knight of Justice eight years later in 1993. In doing so, he joined a select group of approximately 60 professed knights, out of a total of 13,500 knights and dames, and quickly rose through ranks of posts set aside for these knights. In 1994 he was elected Grand Prior of Lombardy and Venice, a position he held until 1999. From 1999 to 2004 he was a member of the Sovereign Council. Dalla Torre was elected Grand Commander of the Order in 2004. Four years later, as Grand Commander, he automatically became the acting head of the order – Lieutenant ad interim – when Andrew Bertie, the 78th Grand Master, died on 7 February. As the "leading Italian member" of the SMOM, he was viewed as a leading candidate to succeed Bertie, but Matthew Festing was elected the new Grand Master on 11 March.

Dalla Torre was elected Grand Prior of Rome on 24 January 2009 and re-elected on 12 February 2015. He held that office until he was elected Lieutenant of the Grand Master and acting head of the SMOM on 29 April 2017, following the resignation of Fra' Matthew Festing as Grand Master three months earlier. In advance of the election of a permanent replacement for Festing, dalla Torre was one of a small number of candidates who had the technical qualifications for the office and was seen as the early favourite. In December 2017, Ludwig Hoffmann-Rumerstein, Grand Commander of the SMOM, acting on his own initiative in what appeared to be an attempt to block dalla Torre's election, asked Pope Francis to abolish the Order's requirement that the Grand Master be of noble ancestry, which would have expanded the number of eligible candidates. Pope Francis rejected his suggestions, and on 2 May 2018 dalla Torre was elected Grand Master.

=== Grand Master ===
Fifty-seven members of the SMOM were chosen to vote on the nomination of dalla Torre as Grand Master. Among them were two women, marking the first time in the history of the Order that female members participated in the selection of a new leader. Upon becoming Grand Master, his full title became "His Most Eminent Highness Fra' Giacomo dalla Torre del Tempio di Sanguinetto, Prince and Grand Master of the Sovereign Military Hospitaller Order of St. John of Jerusalem, of Rhodes and of Malta, Most Humble Guardian of the Poor of Jesus Christ". He took the oath of office on 3 May at Santa Maria del Priorato Church, in the presence of the Council Complete of State who elected him.

As a Vatican insider, dalla Torre sought to swiftly repair the Order's relations with the Holy See, according to the Associated Press. These had been damaged after Festing was requested to resign by Pope Francis in 2017. The Pope had also stepped in to reinstate the Grand Chancellor, Albrecht von Boeselager, whom Festing dismissed from the Order after the SMOM's charity wing under Boeselager's watch was unintentionally implicated in handing out condoms in Myanmar to prevent the transmission of HIV. Under dalla Torre's leadership, the Order's conservative bloc was "eased out" in favour of the reform-oriented group, and institutional changes were in the process of being rolled out.

Dalla Torre informed the Order in a letter issued on 10 June 2019 that all of its official liturgical celebrations had to use the Ordinary Form of the Roman Rite and not the Extraordinary Form (also known as the Tridentine Mass). These celebrations include the SMOM's investitures, masses during its pilgrimages, memorial masses, and its solemnities and feasts. He highlighted how article 3 of Summorum Pontificum (the motu proprio issued by Pope Benedict XVI in 2007 on the use of the Tridentine Mass) grants the Major Superior of religious institutes like the Order of Malta the authority to decide which form of the Mass to be used. The letter made clear that this directive does not encompass – nor aims to encroach on – the "personal preferences" of members in their everyday lives outside of the Order. The diplomatic public affairs and press officer of the SMOM, Marianna Balfour, stressed that dalla Torre's letter was merely a restatement of existing principles, not the creation of new guidelines, and was "aimed only at fostering unity in the Order".

During his tenure as Grand Master, dalla Torre made state visits to countries such as Benin (January 2019), Cameroon (July 2019), Germany, Slovenia, and Bulgaria. On each of those occasions, he paid a visit to the healthcare facilities run by the SMOM, where he visited staff and patients. In September 2019, he expressed his interest in visiting Russia should he be given the opportunity to by the Grand Chancellor, given the Order's historical relations with the country; Paul I of Russia was his predecessor, serving as the de facto 72nd Grand Master from 1799 until 1801. Dalla Torre was also personally involved with many of the Order's charitable works for the sick and the poor. He served food to the homeless at Termini and Tiburtina train stations on a weekly basis. He also participated in the SMOM's pilgrimages to Lourdes, Loreto, and Assisi, as well as its international summer camps for disabled youths.

In his last official action as Grand Master, dalla Torre met with the Sovereign Council on 2 April 2020. They agreed to convene an extraordinary General Chapter in November 2020 to approve the reform of the SMOM Constitution of 1961. Dalla Torre issued a letter to that effect on 28 April.

== Death ==
Dalla Torre died in Rome shortly after midnight on 29 April 2020, at the age of 75. He had been receiving treatment for throat cancer in the months leading up to his death. Pope Francis praised him as "a zealous man of culture and faith" who embodied "a spirit of service for the good of the Church [and] dedication to the most suffering". The Minister for European and Foreign Affairs of Malta, Evarist Bartolo, also expressed his condolences on behalf of the government of Malta. His funeral Mass took place on 5 May at Santa Maria del Priorato Church, presided over by Giovanni Angelo Becciu. He was buried in the crypt of that church next to two of his predecessors, Angelo de Mojana di Cologna and Andrew Bertie. Although the election of a new leader usually takes place within three months after the death or resignation of a Grand Master, the Order confirmed that the election would probably be delayed due to the COVID-19 pandemic. Grand Commander Ruy Gonçalo do Valle Peixoto de Villas Boas served as the interim leader of the SMOM until the election.

== Publications ==
- dalla Torre, Giacomo (2003). "La biblioteca e l'archivio di 'Propaganda fide': prospettive di ricerca". In Zarri, Gabriella (ed.). Ordini religiosi, santità e culti: prospettive di ricerca tra Europa e America Latina : atti del Seminario di Roma, 21–22 giugno 2001. Galatina: Congedo. pp. 153–191. ISBN 9788880864899.
- Frammenti di storia familiare, 2012 (with Giuseppe dalla Torre). Roma: Aracne, 2013.
- "Una scena rara e controversa della scultura paleocristiana", Bollettino dei musei comunali di Roma 19 (1972): 22–26.

== Honours ==
- Sovereign Military Order of Malta
  - Knight Grand Cross since 2017 Collar of the Order pro Merito Melitensi

=== Foreign honours ===
- Bailiff Knight Grand Cross of Justice of the Sacred Military Constantinian Order of Saint George (House of Bourbon-Two Sicilies) (1995)
- Knight Grand Cross with Star of Gold of the Order of Prince Danilo I (House of Petrović-Njegoš) (31 January 2006)
- Knight Grand Cross of the Order of Merit of the Italian Republic (3 April 2006)
- Collar of the Order of Saint Januarius (17 December 2018)
- Grand Cordon of the Cameroon Order of Valour (18 July 2018)
- Grand Cross Special Class of the Order of Merit of the Federal Republic of Germany (21 October 2019)
- Grand Cross of the Order of the Balkan Mountains (13 December 2019)

Political offices
Preceded by Ludwig von Rumerstein	Grand Commander of the Sovereign Military Order of Malta; 2004–2009	Succeeded by Gherardo Hercolani Fava Simonetti
Catholic Church titles
Preceded by Andrew Bertie	Prince and Grand Master of the Sovereign Military Order of Malta; Acting; 2008	Succeeded by Matthew Festing
Preceded by Ludwig von Rumerstein; Acting	Prince and Grand Master of the Sovereign Military Order of Malta; Acting: 2017–2018; 2017–2020	Succeeded by Ruy Gonçalo do Valle Peixoto de Villas Boas; Acting
