= Ruy Villas-Boas =

French Manager

His Excellency The Venerable Bailiff Fra' Ruy Villas-Boas Knight Grand Cross of Justice
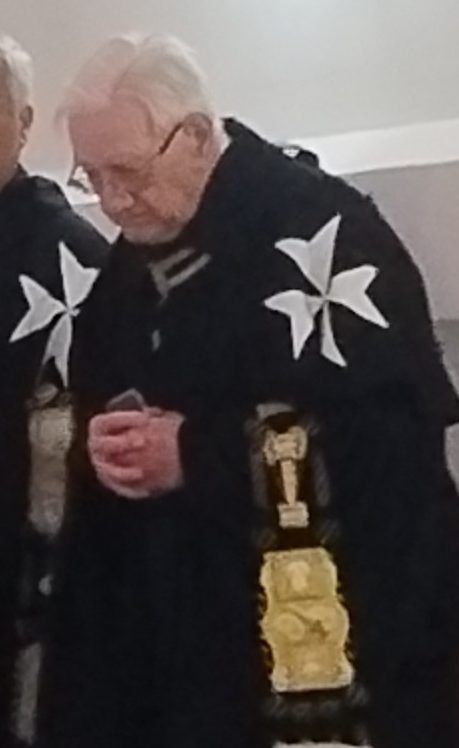
- Fra' Ruy Villas-Boas in 2026

Grand Commander of the Sovereign Military Order of Malta
- In office 1 May 2019 – 3 September 2022
- Monarchs: Giacomo dalla Torre; Himself (acting); Marco Luzzago; Himself (acting); John T. Dunlap
- Preceded by: Carlo d'Ippolito di Sant'Ippolito
- Succeeded by: Emmanuel Rousseau

Lieutenant ad interim of the Sovereign Military Order of Malta
- In office 7 June 2022 – 13 June 2022
- Grand Chancellor: Albrecht von Boeselager
- Preceded by: Marco Luzzago
- Succeeded by: John T. Dunlap
- In office 29 April 2020 – 8 November 2020
- Grand Chancellor: Albrecht von Boeselager
- Preceded by: Giacomo dalla Torre
- Succeeded by: Marco Luzzago

Personal details
- Born: 27 November 1939 (age 86) Porto, Portugal
- Education: University of Porto

Fra' Ruy Gonçalo do Valle Peixoto de Villas-Boas, 5th senhor da Casa de Guilhomil (born 27 November 1939) is Grand Commander and a member of the Sovereign Council of the Sovereign Military Order of Malta. As Grand Commander he automatically served as head of the Order, with the title Lieutenant ad interim, in 2020 and again in 2022.

== Family ==
Villas-Boas was born in Ramalde, Porto, Portugal. His father was Gonçalo Manuel Coelho Vieira Pinto do Vale Peixoto de Sousa de Vilas Boas, 4th senhor da Casa de Guilhomil (1901–1971), second son of the 1st Visconde de Guilhomil. His mother was Margaret Neville Kendall (1917–2007), the daughter of an English family resident in Portugal. His nephews are the football manager André Villas-Boas and the actor João Villas-Boas.

On August 15, 1966, in the chapel of his Quinta da Fonteireira, Villas-Boas married Maria da Conceição Ulrich Pinto Basto, senhora da Casa da Fonteireira (October 9, 1946 – September 17, 2008), only child of Dr. António Gomes da Silva Pinheiro Ferreira Pinto Basto and his wife, Maria Luísa do Casal Ribeiro Ulrich. Villas-Boas and his wife had four sons, each of whom married and had children: Gonçalo (deceased 2020), Frederico, António, and Diogo.

== Professional life ==
Villas-Boas earned a degree in industrial chemical engineering at the University of Porto. After fulfilling his military service requirement, he worked as an engineer for the Portuguese Tobacco Company, where he became Director of Research and Development. He has been a full member of the Cooperation Centre for Scientific Research Relative to Tobacco (CORESTA) and the International Organization for Standardization (ISO). In 1986 he was Vice-President of the Scientific Commission of CORESTA.

== Order of Malta ==
Coat of arms of Fra' Ruy Villas-Boas

In 1984 Villas-Boas became a member of the Order of Malta's Portuguese Association. In 1996 he became a Knight in Obedience. Following the death of his wife in 2008, he became a professed Knight of Justice, taking his solemn vows in 2015. He has held many positions in the Order, including that of the Grand Master's Delegate in Brazil, Councillor, Chancellor, Vice President of the Portuguese Association, and Vice Delegate of the National Associations. For many years he has made the material and spiritual welfare of inmates of a Portuguese prison his personal mission. He participates in the Order's pilgrimages to Fátima and Lourdes.

At the Chapter General of 30–31 May 2014, Villas-Boas was elected a member of Government Council for a five-year term from May 2014 to April 2019. He was elected Grand Commander by the Chapter General on 1 May 2019.

As Grand Commander, Villas-Boas automatically succeeded as Lieutenant ad interim of the Order at the death of Fra' Giacomo dalla Torre, 80th Prince and Grand Master, on 29 April 2020; he served until the election of Fra' Marco Luzzago as Lieutenant of the Grand Master on 8 November 2020. Again as Grand Commander Villas-Boas automatically succeeded as Lieutenant ad interim of the Order at the death of Fra' Marco Luzzago on 7 June 2022; he served until the appointment of Fra' John Dunlap as Lieutenant of the Grand Master by Pope Francis on 13 June 2022.

Villas-Boas has also served as a member of the Council and the Spiritual Coordinator of the Portuguese Knights of the Order. He is a knight of the Order of the Holy Sepulchre.

== Publications ==
- Asociación de los Caballeros de la Soberana Orden Militar de Malta de Paraguay. Fonteireira, 2006.
- Associação Brasileira do Rio de Janeiro da Ordem Soberana Militar e Hospitalária de S. João de Jerusalém, de Rodes e de Malta. Fonteireira, 2006.
- Rol dos cavaleiros de Língua portuguesa dos sécs. XII a XIX e registo das comendas, governadores do hospital e das Maltesas. Fonteireira, 2002.
- "Igreja de S. Brás e Santa Luzia". Filermo 7–8 (1998): 163–183.
- "Os Grão-Mestres portugueses da Ordem de Malta". Filermo 5–6 (1996/97): 93–107.
- Rol dos cavaleiros de Língua portuguesa nos sécs. XVIII e XIX e registo de alguns Cavaleiros anteriores a esse período. Fonteireira, 1995.
