= Matthew Festing =

Prince & Grand Master of the Sovereign Military Order of Malta

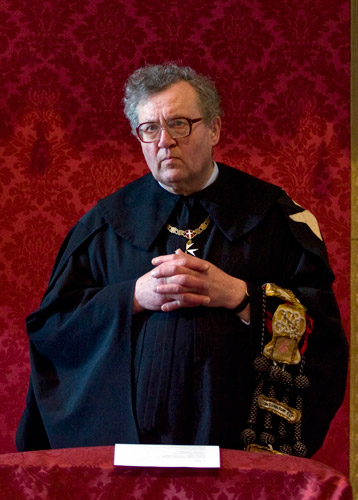
- Festing in 2008

Prince and Grand Master of the Sovereign Military Order of Malta
- Reign: 11 March 2008 – 28 January 2017
- Predecessor: Giacomo dalla Torre (Acting)
- Successor: Ludwig von Rumerstein (Acting)
- Grand Commanders: See list: Giacomo dalla Torre Gherardo Hercolani Fava Simonetti Carlo d'Ippolito di Sant'Ippolito Ludwig von Rumerstein
- Born: 30 November 1949; Northumberland, England
- Died: 12 November 2021 (aged 71); Valletta, Malta
- Burial: 3 December 2021; Saint John's Co-Cathedral, Valletta, Malta
Names
- Robert Matthew Festing
- Father: Sir Francis Festing
- Mother: Mary Cecilia Riddell
- Religion: Roman Catholicism

Fra' Robert Matthew Festing GCStJ OBE TD DL (30 November 1949 – 12 November 2021) was an English Roman Catholic official who was the Prince and Grand Master of the Sovereign Military Order of Malta from 2008 until his resignation on 28 January 2017, following a dispute with the Vatican.

== Family ==
Festing was the youngest of four sons born to Field Marshal Sir Francis Festing, Chief of the Imperial General Staff, a Roman Catholic convert who became a Knight of Malta, and Mary Cecilia (née Riddell), the elder daughter of Cuthbert David Giffard Riddell of Swinburne Castle, Northumberland. His father was the grandson of Colonel Sir Francis Worgan Festing. His mother was from an English recusant family, descending from the Throckmorton baronets and Blessed Sir Adrian Fortescue, martyred in 1539. His three elder brothers are John Festing (a former High Sheriff of Northumberland), Major Michael Festing, and Andrew Festing (formerly President of the Royal Society of Portrait Painters).

== Education and career ==
Festing attended Ampleforth College, before going to St John's College, Cambridge, where he graduated in Modern History. He was sponsored by the British Army in the rank of second lieutenant on a university cadetship whilst at Cambridge before being commissioned, on 23 July 1971, as an ensign in the Grenadier Guards; his personal number was 486330. Until 2008, he was Sotheby's auction representative in Northumberland and held the rank of colonel in the Territorial Army.

Festing was appointed a Deputy Lieutenant for Northumberland in 1994 and in the 1998 Birthday Honours was appointed an Officer of the Order of the British Empire (OBE). He also served as the county cadet commandant of the Northumbria Army Cadet Force and was Patron of the Sandhurst Foundation and a Trustee of Northumbria Historic Churches.

== Order of Malta ==
Festing was admitted to the Sovereign Military Order of Malta in 1977. In 1991, he took perpetual vows, becoming a Knight of Justice. From 1993 to 2008, he served as Grand Prior of England, the first in this office since 1815.

On 11 March 2008, Festing was elected Grand Master following a conclave-style meeting at the order's villa on the Aventine Hill in Rome. Only the third English Grand Master of the Order of Malta, he was the immediate successor to the second, Fra' Andrew Bertie, the first being Hugh de Revel from 1258 to 1277.

=== Resignation ===
Festing and the Holy See had been in dispute since December 2016, when Festing had dismissed the Order's Grand Chancellor, Albrecht, Baron von Boeselager, for not adequately reporting on the distribution of contraceptives, including abortifacients, in a medical project for the poor. Von Boeselager was viewed as an obstacle to Raymond Cardinal Burke's vision of the order, while the German Grand Chancellor's reform-minded approach to the Order's governance clashed with that of Fra' Matthew. Festing revealed he consulted closely with the Congregation for the Doctrine of the Faith, including its then Prefect, Gerhard Cardinal Müller. Knights say the Congregation for the Doctrine of the Faith was consulted about the case but never presented the Order with any documentation nor did they meet with the Grand Chancellor.

Boeselager appealed to Pope Francis, who appointed a five-member commission to look into perceived judicial irregularities in the circumstances of the dismissal. Festing refused to cooperate, describing the commission as an illegitimate intervention in the Order's sovereign affairs, accusing its members of a conflict of interest, and setting up his own internal commission. The Vatican, in turn, rejected what it said was an attempt to discredit members of the commission and ordered the leaders of the institution to cooperate with the inquiry.

In January 2017, Pope Francis asked Festing to resign, with the latter submitting his resignation on January 24. Cardinal Burke, the patron of the Order, tried to convince Festing to withdraw his resignation and keep fighting the Vatican. On 28 January 2017, the Order's Sovereign Council accepted Festing's resignation and re-instated Boeselager. Fra' Ludwig Hoffmann von Rumerstein was chosen as Lieutenant ad interim and presided over the Sovereign Council that annulled the decrees establishing the disciplinary procedures against Boeselager as well as the suspension of his membership in the Order. Boeselager resumed his office as Grand Chancellor immediately.

In April 2017, Archbishop Giovanni Angelo Becciu, the temporary papal delegate to the Order, instructed Festing not to travel to Rome for the election of his successor. He wrote that many of the Order had "expressed their wish" that Festing not travel to Rome for the election as they felt his presence would "reopen wounds" and prevent a return to harmony. As it appeared that Festing ignored this order and arrived in Rome just before the meeting to elect a new Grand Master, the Vatican reconsidered and annulled the order. According to sources within the Order, this was because his absence as a professed knight could have invalidated the ballot.

== Death ==
Festing suddenly collapsed after attending the profession of vows of Fra' Francis Vassallo, in Saint John's Co-Cathedral of Valletta on 4 November 2021. He died eight days later at hospital at the age of 71. His funeral Mass took place on 3 December at Saint John's Co-Cathedral, presided over by cardinal Silvano Maria Tomasi and then he was buried in the crypt of that church next to his predecessors.

== Ancestry ==
Ancestors of Matthew Festing

8. Francis Worgan Festing
4. Francis Leycester Festing
9. Selina Eleanor Mary Carbonell
2. Francis Festing
10. Henry Blathwayt Festing
5. Charlotte Katherine Grindall Festing
11. Mary Eliza Todd
1. Matthew Festing
12. John Giffard Riddell
6. Cuthbert David Giffard Riddell
13. Victoria Henrietta Purcell
3. Mary Cecilia Riddell
14. Matthew Liddell
7. Evelyn Mary Liddell
15. Hannah Delaval Adamson

== Chivalric orders ==
Arms of Matthew Festing as knight of the Order of Isabella the Catholic (Spain)

- Sovereign Military Order of Malta:
  - Bailiff Grand Prior (2017)
  - Grand Master (2008-2017)
  - Bailiff Knight Grand Cross (1991)
  - Knight (1977)
- Officer of the Order of the British Empire (OBE, 12 June 1998)
- Bailiff Grand Cross of the Venerable Order of Saint John (GCStJ, 5 May 2009)
- Territorial Decoration (TD) (1991)
- Collar of the Order of the Star of Romania (6 September 2008)
- Commander of the Great Cross of the Order of the Three Stars (14 October 2008)
- Knight Grand Cross with Collar Order of Merit of the Italian Republic (27 October 2008)
- Grand Cross with Chain of the Order of Merit of the Republic of Hungary (6 February 2009)
- Knight Grand Cross of the Order of St. Charles (14 October 2009)
- Grand Collar of the Military Order of Saint James of the Sword (23 November 2010)
- Grand Star of the Decoration of Honour for Services to the Republic of Austria (2012)
- Recipient of the Grand Order of King Tomislav (12 October 2008)
- Sacred Military Constantinian Order of Saint George (Franco-Neapolitan branch):
  - Bailiff Knight Grand Cross of Justice with Collar (2010)
  - Knight Grand Cross of Justice (1994)
  - Knight of Justice (1991)
- Knight of the Order of St Januarius (2010)
- (Russian Empire) House of Romanov:
  - Knight of the Order of St. Andrew (2014)
  - Knight of the Order of St. Alexander Nevsky (2014)
  - Knight of the Order of the White Eagle (2014)
  - Member 1st Class of the Order of St. Anna (2014)
  - Member 1st Class of the Order of St. Stanislaus (2014)
- Knight of the Holy Military Order of St. Stephen Pope and Martyr
- Grand Collar of the Order of Sikatuna, Rank of Raja (3 March 2015)
- Grand Collar Of the Order of Makarios III (25 October 2012)
- Knight of the Collar of the Order of Isabella the Catholic (31 July 2015)

=== National honours ===
- National Flag Order (Albania) (2015)

=== Crown appointment of the United Kingdom ===
- Deputy Lieutenant for the County of Northumberland

=== Honorary citizenship ===
- Honorary Freeman of the City of Rapallo (Italy, 18 September 2008)
- Pompeii, Italy
- Birgu, Malta

=== Honorary academic degrees ===
Country	Date	School	Degree
United States of America	10 October 2009	Catholic University of America	Doctor of Humane Letters (DHL)
Italy	12 May 2014	John Cabot University	Doctor of Public Service
United Kingdom	—	Northumbria University	

== Sources ==
- Hannah Roberts, "Matthew Festing, Grand Master of the Knights of Malta", Financial Times, 22 June 2016
- Constantin Magnis: Gefallene Ritter. Malteserorden und Vatikan - Der Machtkampf zwischen zwei der ältesten Institutionen der Welt. HarperCollins 2020. ISBN 978-3-95967-368-6.

Catholic Church titles
Preceded by Giacomo dalla Torre; Acting	Grand Master of the Sovereign Military Order of Malta; 2008–2017	Succeeded by Ludwig von Rumerstein; Acting
