= Erik von Kuehnelt-Leddihn =

Austrian noble and political theorist (1909–1999)

Erik Maria Ritter von Kuehnelt-Leddihn
- Born: 31 July 1909; Tobelbad, Duchy of Styria, Austria-Hungary (now Haselsdorf-Tobelbad, Styria, Austria)
- Died: 26 May 1999 (aged 89); Lans, Tyrol, Austria
- Spouse: Countess Christiane Gräfin von Goess
- Children: 3, including Gottfried

Academic background
- Education: University of Vienna; University of Budapest (MA, PhD)
- Influences: Plato; Aristotle; Aquinas; Goethe; Tocqueville; Montalembert; Burckhardt; Taine; Acton; Mises; Rüstow; Jünger; Röpke

Academic work
- Era: 20th-century
- Discipline: Political philosophy Political science Intellectual history
- School or tradition: Monarchism; Liberal conservatism Conservative liberalism Elitism
- Main interests: Monarchy · Comparative politics · History of political thought · Criticism of socialism · Criticism of democracy
- Influenced: Eastman · Buckley · Hoppe · Moldbug

Erik Maria Ritter von Kuehnelt-Leddihn (Note: German: [ˈkyːnəlt lɛˈdiːn]) (31 July 1909 – 26 May 1999) was an Austrian-American nobleman and polymath, whose areas of interest included philosophy, history, political science, economics, linguistics, art and theology. He opposed the ideas of the French Revolution, as well as those of communism and Nazism. Describing himself as a "conservative arch-liberal" or "extreme liberal", Kuehnelt-Leddihn often argued that majority rule in democracies is a threat to individual liberties. He declared himself a monarchist and an enemy of all forms of totalitarianism, although he also supported what he defined as "non-democratic republics", such as Switzerland and the early United States. Kuehnelt-Leddihn cited the U.S. Founding Fathers, Tocqueville, Burckhardt, and Montalembert as the primary influences for his skepticism towards democracy.

Described as a "Walking Book of Knowledge" by William F. Buckley Jr., Kuehnelt-Leddihn had an encyclopedic knowledge of humanities and was a polyglot, being able to speak eight languages and read seventeen others. His early books The Menace of the Herd (1943) and Liberty or Equality (1952) were influential within the American conservative movement. An associate of Buckley Jr., his best-known writings appeared in National Review, where he was a columnist for 35 years.

== Early life and career ==
Kuehnelt-Leddihn was born in Tobelbad, Styria, Austria-Hungary. At 16, he became the Vienna correspondent of The Spectator. From then on, he wrote for the rest of his life. He studied civil and canon law at the University of Vienna at 18. Then he went to the University of Budapest, from which he received an M.A. in economics, studying under Pál Teleki, and later his doctorate in political science. Moving back to Vienna, he took up studies in theology. In 1935, Kuehnelt-Leddihn traveled to England to become a schoolmaster at Beaumont College, a Jesuit public school. Subsequently, he moved to the United States, where he taught at Georgetown University (1937–1938), Saint Peter's College, New Jersey (head of the History and Sociology Department, 1938–1943), Fordham University (Japanese, 1942–1943), and Chestnut Hill College, Philadelphia (1943–1947).

In a 1939 letter to the editor of The New York Times, Kuehnelt-Leddihn critiqued the design of every American coin then in circulation except for the Washington quarter, which he allowed was "so far the most satisfactory coin" and judged the Mercury dime to be "the most deplorable."

After publishing books like Jesuiten, Spießer und Bolschewiken in 1933 (published in German by Pustet, Salzburg) and The Menace of the Herd in 1943, in which he criticized the National Socialists as well as the Socialists, he remained in the United States, as he could not return to the Austria that had been incorporated into the Third Reich. Kuehnelt-Leddihn moved to Washington, D.C. in 1937, where he taught at Georgetown University. He also lectured at Fordham University, teaching a course in Japanese.

Following the Second World War, he resettled in Lans, where he lived until his death. He was an avid traveler: he had visited over seventy-five countries (including the Soviet Union in 1930–1931), as well as all fifty states in the United States and Puerto Rico. In October 1991, he appeared on an episode of Firing Line, where he debated monarchy with Michael Kinsley and William F. Buckley Jr.

Kuehnelt-Leddihn wrote for a variety of publications, including Chronicles, Thought, the Rothbard-Rockwell Report, Catholic World, and the Norwegian business magazine Farmand. He also worked with the Acton Institute, which declared him after his death "a great friend and supporter." He was an adjunct scholar of the Ludwig von Mises Institute. For much of his life, Kuehnelt was also a painter; he illustrated some of his own books.

== Work ==
His socio-political writings dealt with the origins and the philosophical and cultural currents that formed Nazism. He endeavored to explain the intricacies of monarchist concepts and the systems of Europe, cultural movements such as Hussitism and Protestantism, and what he saw as the disastrous effects of an American policy derived from antimonarchical feelings and ignorance of European culture and history.

Kuehnelt-Leddihn directed some of his most significant critiques towards Wilsonian foreign policy activism. Traces of Wilsonianism could be detected in the foreign policies of Franklin Roosevelt; specifically, the assumption that democracy is the ideal political system in any context. Kuehnelt-Leddihn believed that Americans misunderstood much of Central European culture such as the Austro-Hungarian Empire, which Kuehnelt-Leddihn claimed as one of the contributing factors to the rise of Nazism. He also highlighted characteristics of the German society and culture (especially the influences of both Protestant and Catholic mentalities) and attempted to explain the sociological undercurrents of Nazism. Thus, he concludes that sound Catholicism, sound Protestantism, or even, probably, sound popular sovereignty (German-Austrian unification in 1919) would have prevented National Socialism although Kuehnelt-Leddihn rather dislikes the latter two.

Contrary to the prevailing view that the Nazi Party was a radical right-wing movement with only superficial and minimal leftist elements, Kuehnelt-Leddihn asserted that Nazism (National Socialism) was a strongly leftist, democratic movement ultimately rooted in the French Revolution that unleashed forces of egalitarianism, conformity, materialism and centralization. He argued that Nazism, fascism, radical-liberalism, anarchism, communism and socialism were essentially democratic movements, based upon inciting the masses to revolution and intent upon destroying the old forms of society. Furthermore, Kuehnelt-Leddihn claimed that all democracy is basically totalitarian and that all democracies eventually degenerate into dictatorships. He said that it was not the case for "republics" (the word, for Kuehnelt-Leddihn, has the meaning of what Aristotle calls πολιτεία), such as Switzerland, or the United States, as it was originally intended in its constitution. However, he considered the United States to have been to a certain extent subject to a silent democratic revolution in the late 1820s.

In Liberty or Equality, his masterpiece, Kuehnelt-Leddihn contrasted monarchy with democracy and presented his arguments for the superiority of monarchy: diversity is upheld better in monarchical countries than in democracies. Monarchism is not based on party rule and "fits organically into the ecclesiastic and familistic pattern of Christian society." After insisting that the demand for liberty is about how to govern and by no means by whom to govern a given country, he draws arguments for his view that monarchical government is genuinely more liberal in this sense, but democracy naturally advocates for equality, even by enforcement, and thus becomes anti-liberal. As modern life becomes increasingly complicated across many different sociopolitical levels, Kuehnelt-Leddihn submits that the Scita (the political, economic, technological, scientific, military, geographical, psychological knowledge of the masses and of their representatives) and the Scienda (the knowledge in these matters that is necessary to reach logical-rational-moral conclusions) are separated by an incessantly and cruelly widening gap and that democratic governments are totally inadequate for such undertakings.

In February 1969, Kuehnelt-Leddihn wrote an article arguing against seeking a peace deal to end the Vietnam War. Instead, he argued that the two options proposed, a reunification scheme and the creation of a coalition Vietnamese government, were unacceptable concessions to the Marxist North Vietnam. Kuehnelt-Leddihn urged the US to continue the war until the Marxists were defeated.

Kuehnelt-Leddihn also denounced the US Bishops' 1983 pastoral The Challenge of Peace. He wrote that "The Bishops' letter breathes idealism... moral imperialism, the attempt to inject theology into politics, ought to be avoided except in extreme cases, of which abolition and slavery are examples."

The complete work and correspondence of Erik von Kuehnelt-Leddihn is available at the Brenner Archive, University of Innsbruck https://www.uibk.ac.at/de/brenner-archiv/bestaende/kuehnelt/#werke

== Personal life ==
Kuehnelt-Leddihn was married to Countess Christiane Gräfin von Goess, with whom he had three children. At the time of his death in 1999, he was survived by all four of them, as well as seven grandchildren. He and his wife were buried at their village church in Lans.

Kuehnelt held friendships with many of the major conservative intellectuals and figures of the 20th century, including William F. Buckley Jr., Russell Kirk, Crown Prince Otto von Habsburg, Friedrich A. Hayek, Mel Bradford, Ludwig von Mises, Wilhelm Röpke, Ernst Jünger, and Joseph Ratzinger (later Pope Benedict XVI). According to Buckley, Kuehnelt-Leddihn was "the world's most fascinating man." Catholic apologist Karl Keating stated that Kuehnelt-Leddihn was the most intelligent man he ever met.

In 1931, while in Hungary, Kuehnelt-Leddihn stated that he had a supernatural experience. While conversing with a friend, the two men saw Satan appear before them. Kuehnelt-Leddihn recounts this experience as so:

"Slowly, in that moment, to both of us, Satan appeared as Satan appears in primitive books. Naked, reddish, horns, long tongue, trident, and we both exploded laughing. In other words, laughing hysterically. As I later found out, in apparitions of the Devil, this is a natural reaction, that you laugh hysterically."

== Bibliography ==
=== Novels ===
- The Gates of Hell: An Historical Novel of the Present Day. London: Sheed & Ward, 1933.
- Night Over the East. London: Sheed & Ward, 1936.
- Moscow 1979. London: Sheed & Ward, 1940 (with Christiane von Kuehnelt-Leddihn).
- Black Banners. Aldington, Kent: Forty-Five Press & Hand and Flower Press, 1952.

=== Socio-political works ===
- The Menace of the Herd. Milwaukee: The Bruce Publishing Co., 1943 (under the pseudonym of "Francis S. Campbell" to protect relatives in wartime Austria).
- Liberty or Equality. Front Royal, Virginia: Christendom Press, 1952; 1993.
- The Timeless Christian. Chicago: Franciscan Herald Press, 1969.
- Leftism, From de Sade and Marx to Hitler and Marcuse. New Rochelle, New York: Arlington House Publishers, 1974.
- The Intelligent American's Guide to Europe. New Rochelle, N.Y.: Arlington House Publishers, 1979.
- Leftism Revisited, From de Sade and Marx to Hitler and Pol Pot. Washington, D.C.: Regnery Gateway, 1990.

=== Collaborations ===
- "Erik von Kuehnelt-Leddihn." In: F.J. Sheed (Ed.), Born Catholics. New York: Sheed & Ward, 1954, pp. 220–238.
- "Pollyanna Catholicism." In: Dan Herr & Clem Lane (Ed.), Realities. Milwaukee: The Bruce Publishing Company, 1958, pp. 1–12.
- "The Age of the Guillotine." In: Stephen Tonsor (Ed.), Reflections on the French Revolution: A Hillsdale Symposium. Washington, D.C.: Regnery Gateway, 1990.

=== Selected articles ===
- “Credo of a Reactionary”, The American Mercury 57, July 1943.
- “An Anti-Nazi Allegory”, The American Mercury 59, July 1944.
- “Recuperating Spain”, Modern Age 1 (1), March 1957.
- “Revolution, Crime, and Sin in the Catholic World”, Modern Age 2 (2), June 1958.
- “The Artist and the Intellectual in Anglo-Saxonry and on the Continent”, Modern Age 3 (4), December 1959.
- "The Thorny Problem of the Vernacular" The Catholic World, December 1962.
- "The Roots of Leftism in Christendom", The Freeman 18 (2), February 1968.
- "Latin America in Perspective", The Freeman 18 (4), April 1968.
- "The Woes of the Underdeveloped Nations", The Freeman 21 (1), January 1971.
- "The Western Dilemma: Calvin or Rousseau?", Modern Age 15 (1), March 1971.
- "We and the Third World", The Freeman 22 (2), February 1972.
- "The Years of Godlessness", Modern Age 16 (1), March 1972.
- "Free Enterprise and the Russians", The Freeman 22 (8), August 1972.
- "The Roots of ‘Anticapitalism’", The Freeman 22 (11), November 1972.
- "Portrait of an Evil Man", The Freeman 23 (9), September 1973.
- "Scita Et Scienda: The Dwarfing of Modern Man", Imprimis, October 1974.
- "The Unholy Ikons", Modern Age 20 (1), March 1976.
- "Utopias and Ideologies: Another Chapter in the Conservative Demonology", Modern Age 21 (3), September 1977.
- "Controversy", Policy Review 15, January 1981.
- "The Problems of a Successful American Foreign Policy", Imprimis 14 (11), November 1985.
- "Democracy’s Road to Tyranny", The Freeman 38 (5), May 1988.
- "Operation Parricide: Sade, Robespierre, and the French Revolution", Fidelity Magazine, October 1989.
- “The Four Liberalisms”, Religion & Liberty 2 (4), July/August 1992.
- “Economics in the Catholic World”, Religion & Liberty 4 (4), July/August 1994.
- “Christianity, the Foundation and Conservator of Freedom”, Religion & Liberty 7 (6), November – December 1997.
- “Liberalism in America”, The Intercollegiate Review 33 (1), Fall 1997.
- "Hebrews and Christians", The Rothbard-Rockwell Report 9 (4), April 1998.
- "Monarchy and War", The Journal of Libertarian Studies 15 (1), December 2000.
- “The Cultural Background of Ludwig von Mises”, Studies in Classical Liberalism, n.d.

== Sayings ==
- "'Welfare State' is a misnomer, for every state must care for the common good."
- "For the average person, all problems date to World War II; for the more informed, to World War I; for the genuine historian, to the French Revolution."
- "Liberty and equality are in essence contradictory."
- "There is little doubt that the American Congress or the French Chambers have a power over their nations which would rouse the envy of a Louis XIV or a George III, were they alive today. Not only prohibition, but also the income tax declaration, selective service, obligatory schooling, the fingerprinting of blameless citizens, premarital blood tests—none of these totalitarian measures would even the royal absolutism of the seventeenth century have dared to introduce."
- "I am for the word Rightist. Right is right and left is wrong, you see, and in all languages 'right' has a positive meaning and 'left' a negative one. In Italian, typically, la sinistra is 'the left' and il sinistro is 'the mishap' or 'the calamity.' Japanese describes evil as hidar-imae, 'the thing in front of the left.' And in the Bible, it says in Ecclesiastes, which the Hebrews call Koheleth, that “the heart of the wise man beats on his right side and the heart of the fool on his left.'

== See also ==
- Hermann Rauschning
- Monarchism
