= Gottfried von Kühnelt-Leddihn =

Austrian politician and Catholic (born 1948)

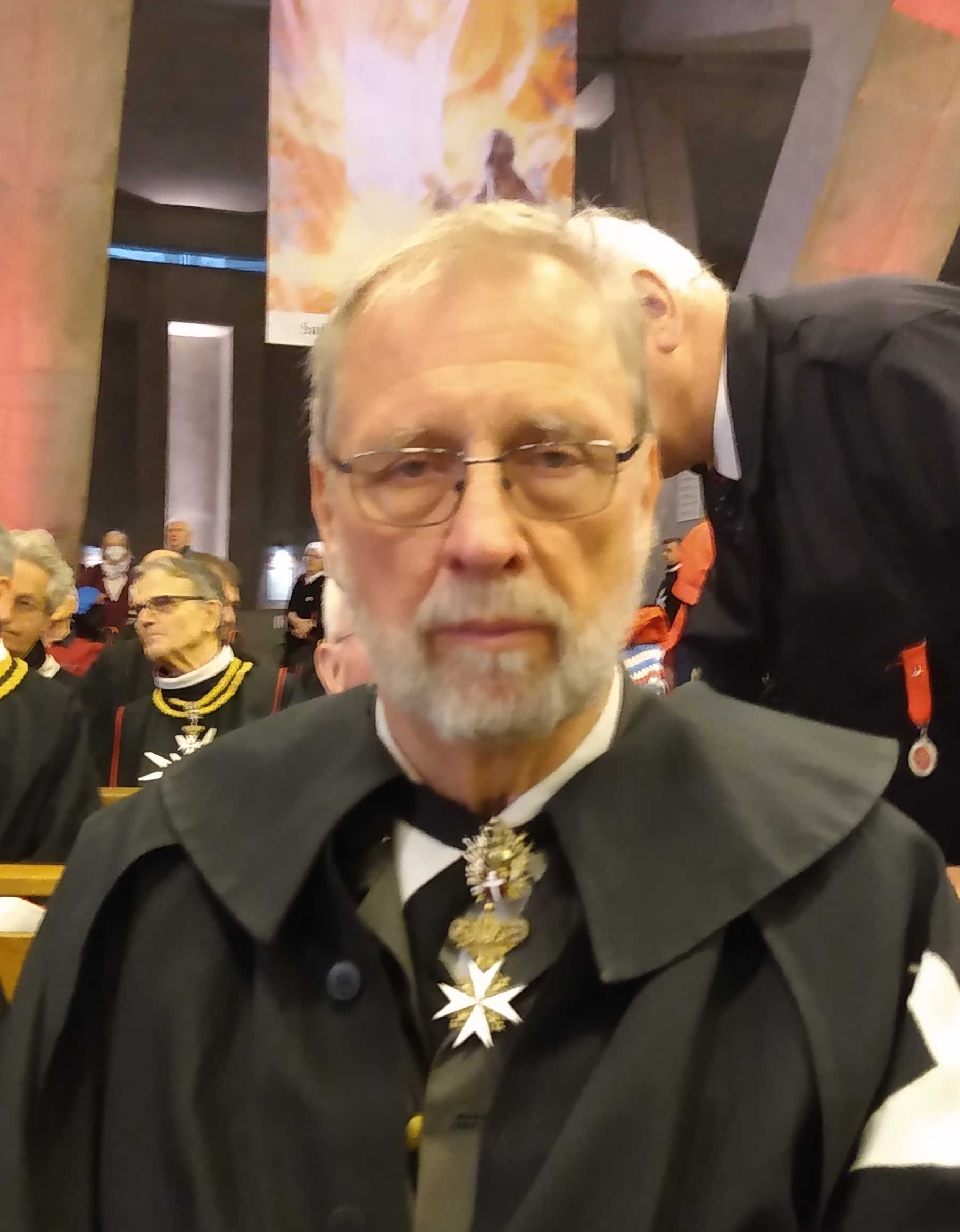
Von Kühnelt-Leddihn in 2023

Fra' Gottfried Ritter von Kühnelt-Leddihn (born 1948, Austria) is a Knight of Justice and Prince Grand Prior of Austria of the Sovereign Military Order of Malta. He is a retired government official of the State of Tyrol in Austria.

== Family ==
Kühnelt-Leddihn is the younger son of Austrian political scientist and Catholic intellectual, Erik von Kuehnelt-Leddihn and of Countess Marie Christiane von Goëss. He has an older brother Erik (born 1938) and an older sister, Isabel (1946–2015) who was active in the Paneuropean Union.

In 1975, Kühnelt-Leddihn married Baroness Eleonore Fraydt von Fraydenegg und Monzello (born 1952), fourth daughter of Baron Wolf-Otto Fraydt von Fraydenegg-Monzello and of Christine Kosak. They had five children.

== Order of Malta ==
Since 1970, Kühnelt-Leddihn has volunteered with the charitable works of Malteser International. After the death of his wife, he took simple vows as a Knight of Justice in the Sovereign Military Order of Malta. On 21 June 2013 he took solemn vows.

In 2014 he was named Hospitaller of the Grand Priory of Austria, responsible for co-ordinating relief work.

In May 2019 he was elected to a five-year term as a member of the Sovereign Council.

He was named Grand Prior of Austria 25 July 2022.

He ceased to be a member of Sovereign Council, 3 September 2022, when Pope Francis appointed a new Sovereign Council.

== Publications ==
- "Gott schuf den Menschen als Sein Abbild", Die Malteser, Ausgabe 2/2019.
