= Marco Luzzago =

Head of the Order of Malta, 2020–2022 (1950–2022)

Fra' Marco Luzzago

Lieutenant of the Sovereign Military Order of Malta
- In office 8 November 2020 – 7 June 2022
- Grand Chancellor: Albrecht von Boeselager
- Preceded by: Ruy Gonçalo do Valle Peixoto de Villas Boas (acting)
- Succeeded by: Ruy Gonçalo do Valle Peixoto de Villas Boas (acting)

Personal details
- Born: 23 June 1950 Brescia, Lombardy, Italy
- Died: 7 June 2022 (aged 71) Villa Cicollini, Sforzacosta, near Macerata, Marche, Italy
- Education: University of Padua; University of Parma

Fra' Marco Luzzago (23 June 1950 – 7 June 2022) was an Italian businessman who was the Lieutenant of the Grand Master and head of the Sovereign Military Order of Malta, a Catholic lay religious order and sovereign subject of international law, from 8 November 2020 until his death in 2022.

== Early life ==
Luzzago was a member of a noble family, which can be traced back in the male line to 1360, from Brescia. An extinct branch of the family received the title of Count of Cesana from the Republic of Venice in 1678. Luzzago was a collateral descendant of the Venerable Alessandro Luzzago and relative to Pope Paul VI.

Luzzago completed his secondary education at the Liceo Scientifico Statale Annibale Calini, a Franciscan institute in Brescia, before studying medicine at the University of Padua and the University of Parma. For many years he managed his family's property interests. This led to business activities in the consumer industry and large-scale retail distribution.

== Knight of the Order of Malta ==
In 1975, Luzzago joined the Sovereign Military Order of Malta as a Knight of Honour and Devotion in the Grand Priory of Lombardy and Venice. In 2003, he took solemn vows as a Knight of Justice. Since 2010 Luzzago was responsible for one of the Order's commanderies in the Marche.

In 2011, Luzzago was promoted to the rank of Knight Commander of Justice in the Grand Priory of Rome, where he held the position of Delegate of the Northern Marches and head of the library. From 2017 on, he was a member of the Council of the Order of Malta's Italian Association.

On 8 November 2020, a Council Complete of State elected Luzzago to the position of Lieutenant of the Grand Master for a period of one year. His election was not without controversy, since the most "Anglo-Saxon" sector of the Order criticized the "unrepresented majority" because at least 12 members, for reasons of health and COVID-19 restrictions, could not attend the Council. The controversy led to his election as a Lieutenant instead of a Grand Master.

He swore his oath before the members of the Council Complete of State and the Pope’s Special Delegate, Cardinal-designate Silvano Maria Tomasi. At his inauguration, he assured that his objective was to reform the Constitutional Charter and the Code, a reform requested by the Holy See. Pope Francis was then informed of the election by letter.

Although the office of Lieutenant of the Grand Mater is constitutionally limited to a one-year term, Pope Francis extended the term of office indefinitely in October 2021 in order to ensure the constitutional reform of the millenary Order. On 26 February 2022 Luzzago was received in audience by the Pope to discuss the reform. On 19 March 2022, the Order presented to the Pope two drafts of the new constitution, keeping the right to read them calmly. As of the day of Luzzago's death, Pope Francis had not stated the results of that readings.

During his tenure, Luzzago received the state visits of the President of Latvia Egils Levits (11 May 2021), the President of Germany Frank-Walter Steinmeier (25 October 2021), and Chairman of the Presidency of Bosnia and Herzegovina Željko Komšić (17 January 2022).

In the face of Russian invasion of Ukraine, Luzzago accompanied the Pope at the penitential liturgy in St Peter's Basilica on 25 March of the same year.

Luzzago went on pilgrimage together with the Order to Assisi on 11 September 2021 after not being able to do so the previous year due to the COVID-19 pandemic. Luzzago attended the Order's international pilgrimage to Lourdes from 28 April to 3 May 2022.

On 7 June 2022, Luzzago died at Villa Ciccolini, a hotel in Sforzacosta, near Macerata. The funeral was held on 14 June.

Catholic Church titles
Preceded by Ruy Gonçalo do Valle Peixoto de Villas Boas; Acting	Grand Master of the Sovereign Military Order of Malta; Acting; 2020–2022	Succeeded by Ruy Gonçalo do Valle Peixoto de Villas Boas; Acting
