= Andrew Bertie =

Fra' Andrew Bertie
- Prince and Grand Master of the Order of Malta; Servant of God
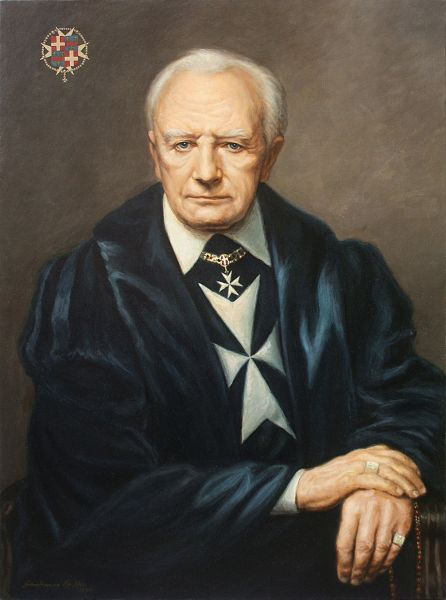
- 78th Prince and Grand Master
- Reign: 11 April 1988 – 7 February 2008
- Predecessor: Fra' Angelo de Mojana di Cologna, 77th Prince and Grand Master
- Successor: Fra' Matthew Festing, 79th Prince and Grand Master
- Born: 15 May 1929; London, England, United Kingdom
- Died: 7 February 2008 (aged 78); Rome, Lazio, Italy
- Burial: 16 February 2008; Santa Maria del Priorato Church, Rome, Italy
Names
- Andrew Willoughby Ninian Bertie
- Dynasty: Bertie family
- Father: Lt. Cdr. the Hon. James Bertie
- Mother: Lady Jean Crichton-Stuart

Andrew Willoughby Ninian Bertie (15 May 1929 – 7 February 2008) was Prince and Grand Master of the Sovereign Military Order of Malta from 1988 until his death in 2008.

On 20 February 2015 a formal inquiry for the cause of his beatification and canonisation was opened in Rome.

== Early career ==
Bertie was born in London as the elder son of Hon. James Bertie (youngest son of the 7th Earl of Abingdon) and Lady Jean Crichton-Stuart (daughter of the 4th Marquess of Bute).

He was the fifth cousin once removed of Queen Elizabeth II, by common descent from King George III and his wife Queen Charlotte Sophia.

He was educated at the English Catholic public school, Ampleforth College, and graduated in Modern History from Christ Church, Oxford. He also attended the School of Oriental and African Studies of the University of London. From 1948 to 1950, he carried out military service in the Scots Guards, becoming a commissioned officer in 1949. After a short experience in the commercial sector, he taught modern languages (particularly French and Spanish but also Russian, German, Dutch, Tibetan and Maltese) for twenty-three years at Worth School, a Benedictine public school in Sussex, England. One of his pupils there was Dominique, Prince and Count de La Rochefoucauld-Montbel, who would become Grand Hospitaller of the Order of Malta. Bertie was a judo black belt and taught judo at Worth School.

== Order of Malta ==
Bertie was admitted to the Sovereign Military Order of Malta as a Knight of Honour and Devotion, 14 November 1956. He became a Knight of Obedience 31 March 1968. On 7 February 1975 he entered the novitiate for Knights of Justice and of 28 March 1977 became of Knight of Justice in temporary vows. He made his perpetual vows as a Knight of Justice 20 May 1981.

In 1981 Bertie also joined the government of the Order as a member of the Sovereign Council. In April 1988, he was elected Grand Master in succession to the late Fra' Angelo de Mojana. Bertie's election was ratified by Pope John Paul II 11 April 1988.

Subsequently, Bertie was Hospitaller of the Sanctuary of Lourdes, which is the annual pilgrimage site of the Order of Malta.

Bertie described the aims of the Order as "to help the poor and the sick; that is and always has been our primary aim":

The other military orders were there to fight the Saracens and to save Spain or the Holy Land or Prussia from the pagans. But we always had this special commitment to the poor and the sick. Our aims today are exactly the same as they were in 1099, the sanctification of our members through service to the sick.

== Personal life ==
Bertie never married or had children. He died in Rome from cancer on 7 February 2008, aged 78.

== Ancestry ==
Ancestors of Andrew Bertie

8. Montagu Bertie, 6th Earl of Abingdon
4. Montagu Bertie, 7th Earl of Abingdon
9. Elizabeth Lavinia Vernon-Harcourt
2. The Hon. James Willoughby Bertie
10. Sir James Charlemagne Dormer
5. Gwendoline Mary Dormer
11. Ella Frances Catherine Alison
1. Andrew Willoughby Ninian Bertie
12. John Crichton-Stuart, 3rd Marquess of Bute
6. John Crichton-Stuart, 4th Marquess of Bute
13. The Hon. Gwendoline Mary Anne Fitzalan-Howard
3. Lady Jean Crichton-Stuart
14. Sir Henry Bellingham, 4th Baronet
7. Augusta Bellingham
15. Lady Constance Julia Eleanor Georgiana Noel

== Titles, styles and honours ==
=== Titles and style ===
His full title was: His Most Eminent Highness Fra' Andrew Willoughby Ninian Bertie, Prince and Grand Master of the Sovereign Military Hospitaller Order of St. John of Jerusalem, of Rhodes and of Malta, Most Humble Guardian of the Poor of Jesus Christ.

=== Honours and awards ===
==== Honours ====
- SMOM: Sovereign Military Order of Malta
  - Grand Master (1988)
  - Knight of Justice (1981)
  - Knight of Honour and Obedience (1956)
- Argentina: Collar of the Order of the Liberator San Martín
- Brazil: Knight Grand Cross with Collar of the National Order of the Southern Cross
- Chile: Collar of the Order of Merit of Chile
- France: Grand Cross of the Legion d’Honneur
- Germany: Grand Cross Special Class of the Order of Merit of the Federal Republic of Germany
- Holy See: Knight with the Collar of the Order of Pope Pius IX
- Italy: Knight Grand Cross with Collar of the Order of Merit of the Italian Republic
- Lithuania: Grand Cross of the Order of Vytautas the Great
- Malta: Honorary Companion of Honour with Collar of the National Order of Merit
- Monaco: Knight Grand Cross of the Order of Saint-Charles
- Morocco: Grand Cordon of the Order of the Throne
- Panama: Gold Collar of the Order of Manuel Amador Guerrero
- Poland: Grand Cross of the Order of Merit of the Republic of Poland (10 May 2007)
- Portugal: Grand Collar of the Order of Prince Henry
- Romania: Grand Cross of the Order of the Star of Romania
- Slovakia : Grand Cross (or 1st Class) of the Order of the White Double Cross (1997)
- Spain: Collar of the Order of Isabella the Catholic (21 May 1999)
- Venezuela: Collar of the Order of the Liberator
- Venezuela: Collar of the Order of Andrés Bello
- House of Bourbon-Two Sicilies: Bailiff Grand Cross with Collar of the Sacred Military Constantinian Order of Saint George
- House of Bourbon-Two Sicilies: Knight Grand Cross of the Order of Saint Januarius
- House of Habsburg: Knight of the Order of the Golden Fleece (Austrian Branch)
- House of Karadjordjevic: Grand Cross of the Order of the Star of Karageorge
- House of Karadjordjevic: Knight Grand Cross of the Order of the White Eagle
- House of Romanov: Knight of the Order of St. Andrew
- House of Romanov: Knight Grand Cross of the Order of St. Anna
- House of Romanov: Knight Grand Cross of the Order of St. Vladimir
- House of Romanov: Knight Grand Cross of the Order of St. Alexander Nevsky
- House of Romanov: Knight Grand Cross of the Order of St. Stanislaus
- House of Savoy: Knight of the Order of the Most Holy Annunciation
- House of Savoy: Knight Grand Cross of the Order of Saints Maurice and Lazarus
- House of Savoy: Knight Grand Cross of the Order of the Crown of Italy

==== Awards ====
- Path to Peace Award (2005)
- Matteo Ricci Award (2006)

==== Honorary citizenships ====
- Honorary citizen of Rapallo (1992), Veroli (1993), Lourdes (1999), Magione (2002), Birgu (2003), and Santa Severina (2003). In Bolivia in 2002 he was created Huesped Ilustre of La Paz, El Alto, and Santa Cruz.

==== Honorary degrees ====
- Medicine and surgery, University of Bologna (1992)
- Jurisprudence, University of Malta (1993)
- Humanities, University of Santo Domingo (1995)
- Laws, St. John's University, Minnesota (2003)

Catholic Church titles
| Preceded by Angelo de Mojana di Cologna | Grand Master of the Knights Hospitaller; 1988–2008 | Succeeded by Matthew Festing |
