= John T. Dunlap =

Prince & Grand Master of the Order of Malta

John Dunlap
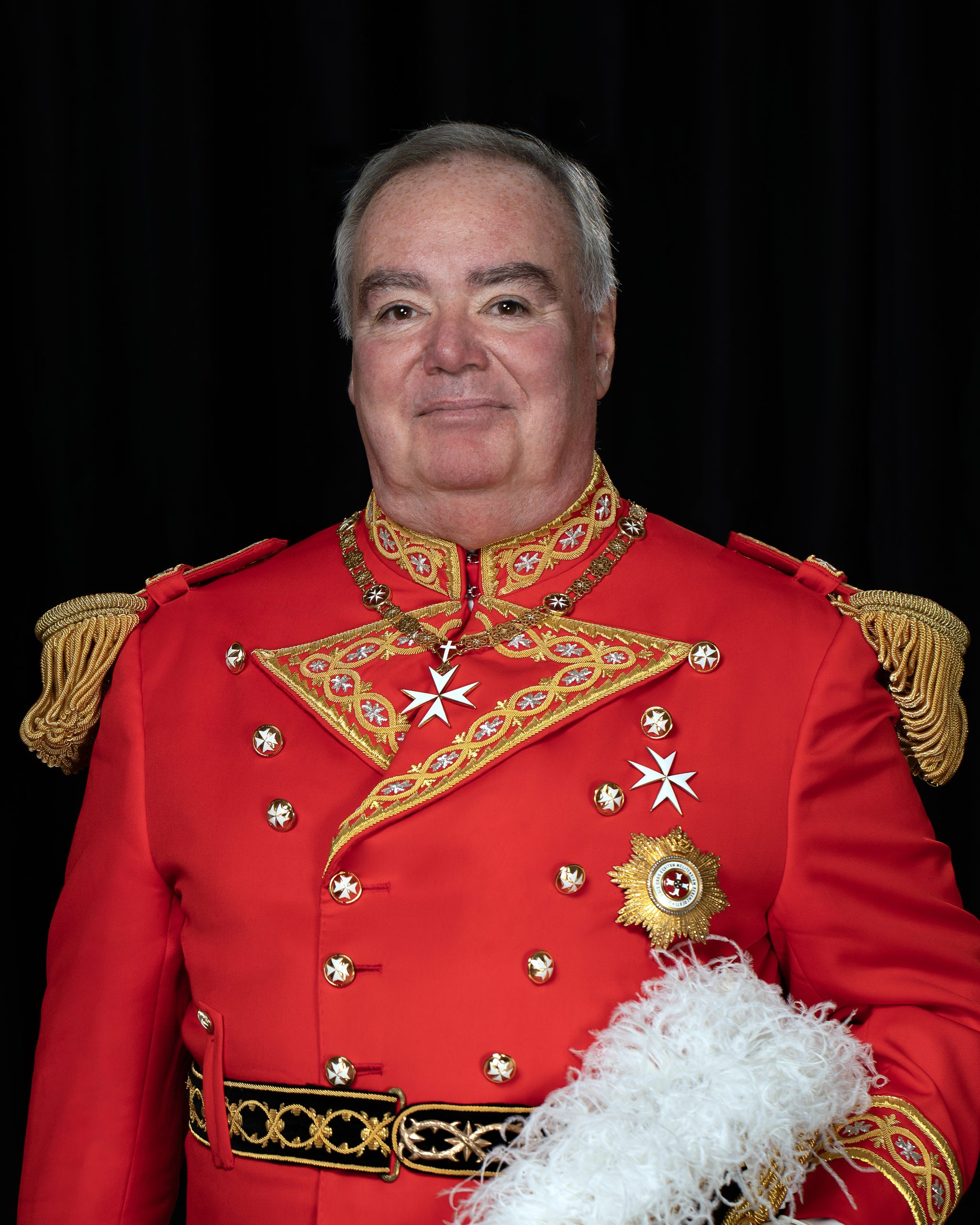
- Dunlap in 2023

Prince and Grand Master of the Sovereign Military Order of Malta
- Reign: 3 May 2023 – present Acting: 13 June 2022–3 May 2023
- Predecessor: Giacomo dalla Torre
- Grand Chancellors: See list: Albrecht von Boeselager Riccardo Paternò di Montecupo
- Born: 16 April 1957 (age 69); Ottawa, Ontario, Canada
Names
- John Timothy Dunlap
- Father: John Gerard Dunlap QC
- Mother: Dena Morrison
- Religion: Roman Catholicism

Fra' John Timothy Dunlap (born 16 April 1957) is a Canadian attorney and the reigning prince and 81st grand master of the Sovereign Military Order of Malta since his election in 2023.

Dunlap previously served as lieutenant of the Order of Malta from 13 June 2022 before becoming the first sovereign prince and grand master without noble or aristocratic descent, as previously required, following Pope Francis' revision of the Order's constitution in 2022.

== Education and career ==
The only son of John G. Dunlap QC and nephew of Judge Frank Dunlap, his grandfather was Henry Joseph Dunlap MC, late of the Royal Canadian Engineers, of Scottish descent.

Born and raised in Ottawa, Dunlap received a Bachelor of Arts degree from the University of Ottawa and a Juris Doctor degree from the University of Western Ontario, having also studied at the University of Nice, France.

Admitted to the New York State Bar and the Law Society of Ontario as barrister and solicitor, in 1987, Dunlap joined the New York law firm Dunnington, Bartholow & Miller, becoming a partner in 1993. Specialising in corporate and immigration law, he was appointed legal advisor to the Permanent Observer of the Holy See to the United Nations.

== Order of Malta ==
Appointed a Knight of Magistral Grace of the Order of Malta in 1996, Dunlap professed temporary vows in 2004. On 7 June 2008, he professed perpetual vows as a Knight of Justice at the Church of St. Joseph in Greenwich Village. In 2006, he was elected the First Regent, or religious superior, of the Sub-Priory of Our Lady of Lourdes, which comprises Knights, First and Second Class, who are members of either the American Association or the Federal Association.

In May 2014, Dunlap was elected to a five-year term as a member of the Order's Sovereign Council. He also serves as President of the Committee on the Orders of St John, set up as a collaborative body between the Order of Malta and the four non-Catholic orders of St John.

On 13 June 2022, Pope Francis appointed Dunlap as Lieutenant Grand Master of the Order of Malta, before, on 3 May 2023, being elected Sovereign Prince and 81st Grand Master. Dunlap's election was made possible by Pope Francis's 2022 revisions to the Order's constitution, which removed the traditional requirement for the Grand Master to prove noble ancestry.

== Charitable activities ==
Dunlap is President Emeritus of the Canadian Club of New York, former Vice-President of the Royal Conservatory of Music Foundation (Toronto), former President of the Friends of the Certosa di Capri (Italy) and currently serves as a Trustee of John Cabot University (Rome).

== Coat of arms ==
Armorial bearings of His Most Eminent Highness the Prince and Grand Master Fra' John Dunlap

Coat of arms of John T. Dunlap

Notes
As Prince and Grand Master His Most Eminent Highness quarters the Order of Malta (1st & 4th) with his Dunlap family arms (2nd & 3rd) granted to his father, John Gerard Dunlap, in 2003.
Crest
Issuant from Waves Argent a Wall Gules charged with a Trillium Proper between two Thistles Or and issuing therefrom a Hand Proper grasping a Sword Argent hilted Or.
Escutcheon
Argent a double-headed Griffin sejant affronté per fess Gules and Sable holding in its claws a Sword point in base Argent hilted Or.
Motto
Concussus Surgo

== Honours and decorations ==
Fra' John Timothy Dunlap received the title of Canon ad honorem of the Saint Lawrence Collegiate Chapter of Vittoriosa by solemn decree of His Grace the Metropolitan Archbishop of Malta Mgr Charles Jude Scicluna on 16 June 2023. His Most Eminent Highness was decorated with the pectoral cross which is one of the insigna bestowed by the Holy See on the Collegiate Chapter.

Fra' John Dunlap has also been awarded the following honours:

=== Papal orders ===
- Collar of the Grand Master (3 May 2023)
- Grand Cross of Justice Professed of Solemn Vows of the Sovereign Military Order of Malta
- Collar of the Order pro Merito Melitensi
- Cross of Commander of the Order pro Merito Melitensi (2002)
- Knight of Grand Cross of the Equestrian Order of the Holy Sepulchre of Jerusalem (Holy See)
- Medal for the "Ukraine" campaign
- Medal for the "Covid-19" campaign
- Commemorative ribbon for the 50th anniversary of the Sovereign Military Order of Malta’s pilgrimage to Lourdes
- Commemorative medal "Bulla Pie Postulatio Voluntatis – 1113–2012"
- SMOM commemorative medal for the solemn exposition of the Holy Shroud in Turin in 2015
- Medal of merit for Lourdes pilgrimages
- Souvenir medal for Lourdes pilgrimages
- Souvenir medal for Lourdes pilgrimages

=== Commonwealth honours ===
- Knight of Justice of the Most Venerable Order of St John (UK – 29 January 2020)
- Queen Elizabeth II Golden Jubilee Medal (Canada – 6 February 2002)
- Queen Elizabeth II Diamond Jubilee Medal (Canada – 6 February 2012)
- Queen Elizabeth II Platinum Jubilee Medal (Nova Scotia - 6 February 2022)
- King Charles III Coronation Medal (Canada - 10 February 2025)

“Your exceptional contributions to Canada, as well as your dedicated service within the Sovereign Military Order of Malta, exemplify the values of leadership and commitment that this honour seeks to recognize. Your leadership reflects a new era of inclusivity and progressive change within the Order. This medal is a testament to your enduring dedication and the profound influence you have had within both your community and the broader global stage”.

=== National orders ===
- Recipient of the Grand Order of King Tomislav (Croatia – 8 July 2026)
- Recipient of the Order of the Montenegrin Grand Star (Montenegro – 17 March 2026)
- Grand Star of the Decoration of Honour for Services to the Republic of Austria (Vienna – 28 November 2025)
- Collar of the Equestrian Order of San Marino (City of San Marino – 3 July 2025)
- City of Lourdes Medal (Lourdes – 6 May 2025)
- Knight Grand Cross of the Order of Saint Charles (Monaco – 22 April 2025)
- Knight of the Order of the White Eagle (Poland – 27 March 2025)
- Grand Cross of the Order of the Redeemer (Greece)
- Grand Cross with Chain of the Hungarian Order of Merit (Hungary – 17 July 2024)
- Grand Cross of the Order of Omar Torrijos Herrera (Panama – 27 February 2024)
- Knight Grand Cross with Collar of the Order of Merit of the Italian Republic (Italy – 21 November 2023)
- Knight Grand Cross of the Order of the Star of Italy (Italy – 9 January 2023)
- Grand Officer of the National Order of Merit (Romania – 14 February 2013)"On the occasion of the celebration of 80 years of bilateral relations between the Sovereign Military Order of Malta and Romania, as a sign of great appreciation for the special contribution to the development of ties with our country and the support of the activity of the Maltese Aid Service in Romania".

=== Dynastic orders ===
- Knight of the Imperial Order of St. Andrew (House of Romanov) (15 February 2024)
- Knight of the Supreme Order of the Most Holy Annunciation (House of Savoy)
- Knight of the Order of Saint Januarius (House of Bourbon-Two Sicilies)

“As Head of the Royal House of the Two Sicilies and heir of the Farnese house, I have the privilege of remitting today to your Excellency the insignia of the Distinguished Royal Order of San Gennaro. The conferral of such honor, named after the Holy Martyr Januarius, the Patron of Naples, to you, the Head of the Sovereign Military Order of Malta, represents a further confirmation of the centuries-old and special relations of my House with the Sacred Religion, both during the ancient Kingdom of the Two Sicilies and even more in subsequent times".

- Bailiff Knight Grand Cross of Justice with Collar of the Sacred Military Constantinian Order of Saint George (House of Bourbon-Two Sicilies) (14 September 2022)
- Senator Grand Cross with Collar of the Sacred Angelic Imperial Constantinian Order of St. George (House of Bourbon-Parma) (15 April 2024)
- Knight Grand Cross of the Order of Prince Danilo I (House of Petrović-Njegoš)
- Knight Grand Cross of the Order of Saint Joseph (House of Habsburg-Tuscany)
- Knight Grand Cordon of the Order of Saints Maurice and Lazarus (House of Savoy)
- Knight of the Order of the Golden Fleece (House of Habsburg-Lorraine)
- Grand Cross with Collar of the Order of Saint Michael of the Wing (House of Braganza) (24 June 2023)
- Grand Cross of the Order of the Immaculate Conception of Vila Viçosa (House of Braganza) (20 June 2023)
- Bailiff Grand Cross of the Order of Saint Stephen (House of Habsburg-Tuscany) (20 December 2023)
- Grand Cordon with Star of the Royal Order of Skanderbeg (House of Zogu)

Catholic Church titles
Preceded by Giacomo dalla Torre del Tempio di Sanguinetto	Prince and Grand Master of the Sovereign Military Order of Malta; Acting: 2022–2023; 2023–present	Incumbent
