= Viazzo =

Viazzo is an Italian surname. Notable people with the surname include:

- Matias Viazzo (born 1983), Argentine rugby union player
- Roberto Viazzo (born 1952), Italian physician and member of the Sovereign Military Order of Malta
