= Roberto Viazzo =

Fra' Roberto Viazzo
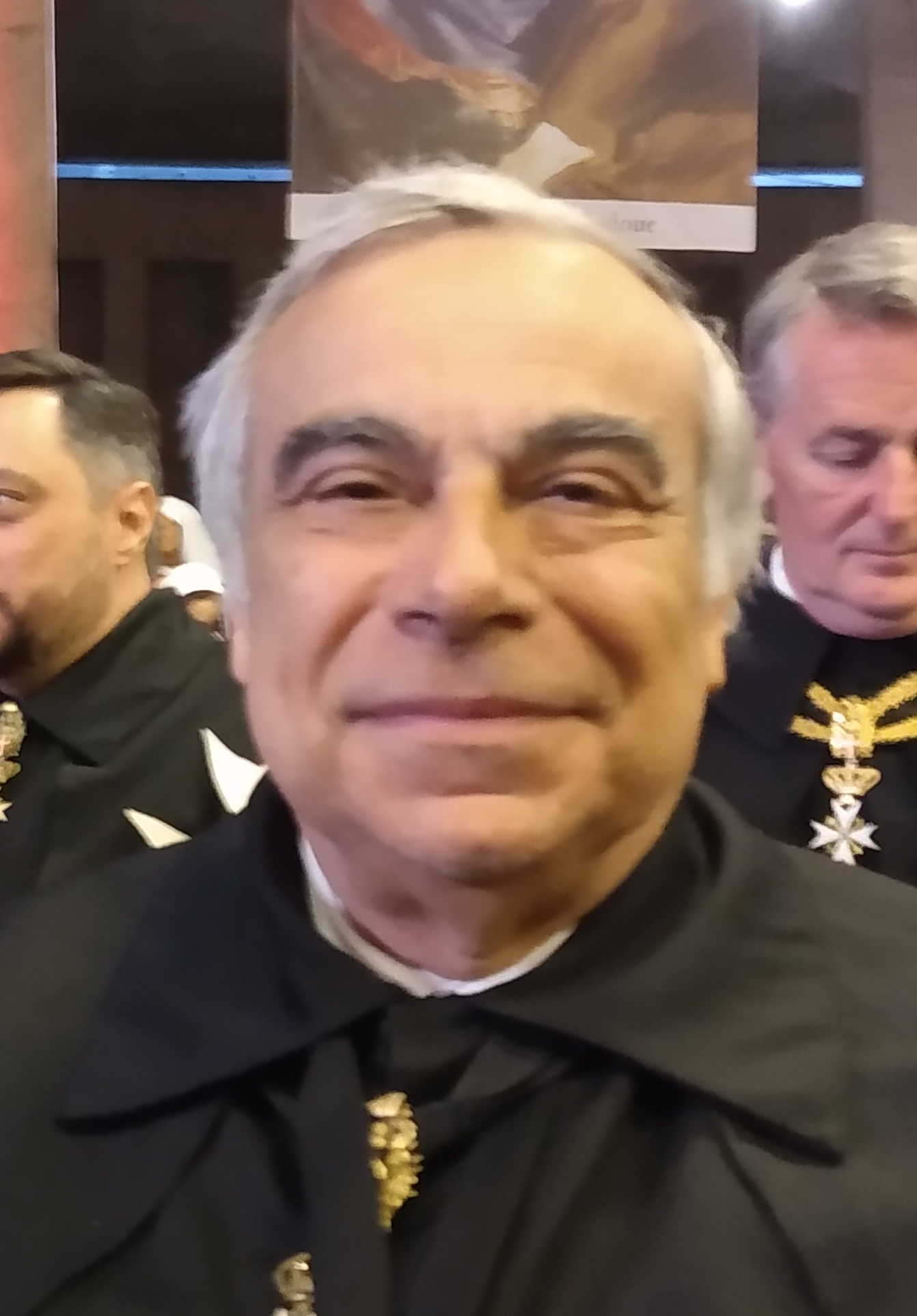

Member of the Sovereign Council of the Sovereign Military Order of Malta

Fra' Roberto Viazzo (born October 29, 1952) is an Italian medical doctor and a member of the Sovereign Council of the Sovereign Military Order of Malta. Since December 3, 2022, he has been Administrator of the Grand Priory of Rome.

== Career ==
Viazzo is the head of the Anesthesia, Resuscitation, and Pain Therapy Section at the Azienda Sanitaria Locale di Vercelli. He is President of the Rotary Club Valsesia. He was named an Ufficiale of the Order of Merit of the Italian Republic, 2 June 2022.

== Order of Malta ==
On January 12, 2017, Viazzo made his solemn vows as a Knight of Justice in the Sovereign Military Order of Malta at the Santuario Diocesano Madonna degli Infermi in Vercelli.

Viazzo was elected to a five-year term as a member of the Sovereign Council in May 2019. He is also a member of the Chapter of the Grand Priory of Rome and a member of the Council of the Order's Italian Association.
