= Jake Dunlap =

Canadian football player (1925–2010)

Profile
- Position: Tackle

Personal information
- Born: August 18, 1925; Ottawa, Ontario, Canada
- Died: October 17, 2010 (aged 85); Ottawa, Ontario, Canada

Career history
- 1944: Ottawa Trojans
- 1945–48: Ottawa Rough Riders
- 1949–50: Toronto Argonauts
- 1951: Ottawa Rough Riders
- 1952: Hamilton Tiger-Cats
- 1953–54: Ottawa Rough Riders

Awards and highlights
- 2× Grey Cup champion (1950, 1951); CFL All-Star (1953)

John Gerard "Jake" Dunlap QC (August 18, 1925 – October 17, 2010) was a Canadian diplomat and former football player for the Toronto Argonauts of the Interprovincial Rugby Football Union. He was named the first Agent General of the Province of Ontario to the United States.

== Biography ==
Dunlap was a football player for the Toronto Argonauts from 1949 to 1950, when he played 22 regular season and 3 playoff games. He played pro football for 11 seasons, and was selected as an All-Star in 1953.

He blocked a kick that led to the only touchdown in the 38th Grey Cup game, popularly known as the "Mud Bowl".

Dunlap later settled in his hometown, Ottawa, Ontario, and practiced law with his firm Dunlap Dunlap & McInenly. In 1968, he was named a Queen's Counsel. In 1983, he was named the first Agent General of the Province of Ontario to the United States. He retired back to Ottawa in 1988.

He died on October 17, 2010, in hospital in Ottawa, Ontario.

== Family ==
He was the son of Henry Joseph Dunlap MC, late member of the Corps of Royal Canadian Engineers, of Scottish descent. His brother, Frank Dunlap, was both a Canadian Football League and National Hockey League player, and his son, Fra' John T. Dunlap, is the 81st Prince and Grand Master of the Sovereign Military Order of Malta.
