= John Eidinow =

English barrister and Knight of Justice of the Order of Malta

Fra' John Samuel Christopher Eidinow (born September 1968) is a barrister and a Knight of Justice of the Order of Malta and was the Presiding Fellow at St Benet's Hall, Oxford. He currently serves as the Dean and Keeper of the Statutes at Merton College, Oxford

== Early life ==
Eidinow was born and raised in London and was educated at Highgate School.

== Academic career ==
Eidinow read Classics at Merton College, Oxford, and received the degree Master of Arts from the University of Oxford. In January 1992 he was appointed to a lecturership in Classics at Merton College where he was later elected a Bodley Fellow. Since 2003 he has been Director of Studies in Classics at St. Benet's Hall. In 2004 he was named a Fellow of St. Benet's. He is also Dean and Keeper of the Statutes at Merton College.

His research is mostly about the Roman poet Horace, although he has also written about Ovid and Virgil. He was formerly Honorary Secretary of the Horatian Society.

Eidinow has a Graduate Diploma in Law from City, University of London. He is a barrister of the Middle Temple and a member of New Square Chambers.

== Sovereign Military Order of Malta ==
In 2011 Eidinow founded the Companions of the Order of Malta, Oxford, a group of Oxford University students who serve the poor and marginalised.

In 2011 Eidinow published a new English translation of the Rule written by the second Master of the Knights Hospitaller, Raymond du Puy.

On 16 June 2014 in Merton College Chapel Eidinow made his solemn vows as a Knight of Justice. He has served as Chancellor of the Grand Priory of England.

In January 2023 Eidinow was elected to the Sovereign Council of the Sovereign Order of Malta in an Extraordinary Chapter General of the Order called by Pope Francis.

== Publications ==
- "Horace’s Epistle to Torquatus", Classical Quarterly 45 (1995): 191–99.
- "Purpureo bibet ore nectar: A Reconsideration", Classical Quarterly 50 (2000): 463–71.
- "Dido, Aeneas, and Iulus: Heirship and Obligation in Aeneid 4", Classical Quarterly 53 (2003): 260–67.
- "Horace: Critics, canons and canonicity", in Houghton, L.B.T. and Wyke, M. (eds.), Perceptions of Horace: A Roman Poet and his Readers (Cambridge: Cambridge University Press, 2009), pp. 80–95.
- "Virgil in the Works of Alexandre Dumas père: An Introduction", Proceedings of the Vergilian Society 27 (2011): 38–55.
