= The Challenge of Peace: God's Promise and Our Response =

1983 pastoral letter of the American Catholic bishops

The Challenge of Peace: God's Promise and Our Response is a 1983 pastoral letter of the American Catholic bishops addressing the issue of war and peace in a nuclear age. It reviewed the Catholic Church's teachings about peace and war, reaffirmed the just war theory as the main principles for evaluating the use of military force, acknowledged the legitimacy of nonviolence as an alternative moral framework for individuals, evaluated the current issues in US defense policy, and proposed a series of actions that individuals could undertake.

== Background ==
The bishops decided to take a fresh look at the problems of war and peace at their November 1980 meeting. This decision was motivated by their concern over a number of developments in US-Soviet relations and US nuclear weapons policy in recent years.

The US-USSR détente was under increasing strain from the mid-1970s and ceased altogether after the Soviet invasion of Afghanistan in 1979. Large increases in the Soviet missile force led conservative critics of the policies of the Nixon, Ford and Carter administrations to charge that strategic stability based on nuclear parity and the strategy of Mutual Assured Destruction had failed and needed to be replaced by a major increase in American nuclear forces such that the US would have the capacity to fight an extended nuclear war. Carter's Secretary of Defense Harold Brown announced a shift in US strategy to denial of the Soviet Union of having any capacity to initiate a nuclear war and win. New weapon systems were advanced to achieve such nuclear war fighting capability, in particular, the Trident submarine launched ballistic missile, the MX ICBM and the ground-launched cruise missile. The SALT II arms control treaty was signed in 1979 but the US Senate failed to ratify it. During the 1980 presidential election campaign, Ronald Reagan promised that his administration would undertake an acceleration of the build-up of US nuclear forces. Upon taking office, his administration followed through on that promise. Upper-level defense officials spoke of attaining the capability to prevail in a nuclear war and advocated an increase in civil defense capabilities to protect much of the public in case of such a war.

The acceleration of the strategic arms race, the hardening of US-Soviet conflict and the rhetoric of nuclear war fighting produced a substantial public reaction. Huge demonstrations in Europe and the US opposed the increase in nuclear weapons expenditures and deployments. A movement for a “freeze” in the nuclear arms race quickly gained support in the Western nations. Several studies carefully and exhaustively detailed the catastrophic consequences of any large scale use of nuclear weapons in order to refute the idea that nuclear war could be survived, much less won.

In response, at their 1980 annual meeting National Conference of Catholic Bishops decided to undertake a review of Catholic teaching on war and peace as it would pertain to contemporary issues of nuclear deterrence, nuclear strategy and the deployment of various weapons systems.

Archbishop John Roach, President of the NCCB, appointed an ad hoc committee to undertake such a study. The five members were Joseph Bernardin, who chaired the committee, John O’Connor, Thomas Gumbleton, Daniel Reilly and George Fulcher. O’Connor was Auxiliary Bishop of the Military Ordinate (that is, the chaplains serving the armed forces) and would be sympathetic to arguments supportive of the military. Gumbleton was a prominent member of Pax Christi USA, a Catholic peace organization; he would bring to the committee a perspective critical of military programs. Reilly and Fulcher were chosen because they had not previously committed themselves to positions on the issues before the committee. In addition, two leaders of ordained religious orders were appointed to participate in the work and discussions of the committee, but without a vote. They were Father Richard Warner and Sister Juliana Casey.

The committee was assisted by two staff members and a consultant. One staff member was Fr. J. Bryan Hehir. He had earned a doctorate in Applied Theology at Harvard University in 1977. At Harvard he had studied under Professor Stanley Hoffmann, a prominent international relations scholar. Hehir previously had been appointed to the Vatican delegations to the UN General Assembly in 1973 and to the UN Special Session on Disarmament in 1978. At the time of his appointment to the committee's staff, he had been Director of the Office of International Affairs of the US Conference of Catholic Bishops since 1973. The second staff member was Ed Doherty, a former Foreign Service Officer who had been a staff member of the US Conference of Catholic Bishops. The consultant was Bruce M. Russett, a Professor of Political Science at Yale University and a prominent international relations scholar.

The committee prepared the pastoral letter in three drafts spread out over 2.5 years. In preparing the first draft, they interviewed many experts in nuclear strategy, including former Secretaries of Defense James Schlesinger and Brown, former arms control negotiator Gerard Smith, and Reagan Administration officials Lawrence Eagleburger (Undersecretary of State), Alexander Haig (Secretary of State), Caspar Weinberger (Secretary of Defense) and Eugene Rostow (Director of the Policy Planning Staff, Department of State). Each of the first two drafts was extensively discussed at the bishops’ annual meetings in 1981 and 1982 respectively. Additional feedback arose because of the public nature of the process. Each draft got much press coverage and its contents were vigorously critiqued in the mass media. Also, prominent Catholic members of the Reagan Administration wrote letters to the committee seeking to adjust its thinking on policy matters.

The third draft was considered at an ad hoc meeting of the bishops in Chicago, May 1–3, 1983. After adopting many amendments, the bishops approved the letter by a vote of 238 in favor and 9 opposed.

== Content ==
The pastoral letter contains an introduction, four main sections and a summary.

=== First Section ===
The first section summarizes foundational ideas about the authority of Catholic bishops to teach about matters of war and peace and about the morality of war and peace. It reaffirms traditional Catholic teachings of a strong presumption against war while allowing it when necessary and effectual for preserving a just peace that preserves fundamental human rights and dignity. In particular, it defends a nation's legitimate right to self-defense against attack while asserting the right of individuals to choose non-violent means of resisting aggression. The legitimate right of self-defense is elaborated by the enunciation of the criteria for war to be considered just.

=== Second Section ===
The second section evaluates nuclear weapons in light of just war principles. Its main points hold that attacks directed at an enemy's population always is morally repugnant; that nuclear war may never be initiated; that limited use of nuclear weapons is likely to become unlimited; and that nuclear deterrence is morally acceptable as an interim position provided that effective steps are taken to disarm nuclear arsenals, but targeting populations centers as part of a deterrent posture violates moral principles; that nuclear arsenals may not exceed what is sufficient for deterrence; and that there should be an immediate “freeze” of nuclear arsenals and programs followed by a comprehensive nuclear test ban.

=== Third Section ===
The third section looks at the broader problem of war in the contemporary world. It asserts that the only just cause for use of force in the modern world is self-defense or defense of those who are under attack and it cautions against any use of force could well escalate to the point that its destruction was disproportionate to the just cause that motivated it. It calls for increased commitment to diplomatic solutions to the problems among nations, in particular those in the areas of arms control and disarmament, and for a strengthening of the United Nations so that it can protect the security of its members. It reaffirms the legitimacy of developing non-violent means for conflict resolution.

=== Fourth Section ===
The fourth section provides guidance to the members of the Catholic Church in America about how to implement the guidance in the letter. It is part of the Catholic social teaching tradition.
