= Frank Dunlap =

Canadian athlete and lawyer (1924–1993)

Profile
- Positions: Quarterback, halfback, flying wing

Personal information
- Born: August 10, 1924; Ottawa, Ontario, Canada
- Died: September 26, 1993 (aged 69)

Career history
- 1943: Ottawa Combines
- 1943–1944: Toronto Maple Leafs (NHL)
- 1944: Ottawa Trojans
- 1945–1947: Ottawa Rough Riders
- 1948–1949: Toronto Argonauts
- 1950–1951: Ottawa Rough Riders

Awards and highlights
- Grey Cup champion (1951); CFL All-Star (1946)

Francis Egan "Judge" Dunlap (August 10, 1924 - September 26, 1993) was a Canadian athlete who played both Canadian football and ice hockey. He spent 8 years playing professional football in the Canadian Football League, including with the Ottawa Rough Riders and Toronto Argonauts between 1945 and 1951, winning the Grey Cup with Ottawa in 1951. He also played 5 games in the National Hockey League with the Toronto Maple Leafs during the 1943–44 season.

== Early life ==
Frank Dunlap was born in Ottawa, Ontario. He was the second of four children born to Henry and Anne Dunlap of the Glebe. Frank Dunlap attended St. Patrick's College in Ottawa, where he played halfback on the football team and also starred at right wing on the school's hockey team. In 1940, Dunlap won the Doran Memorial Trophy, which was awarded to the best all-around student, which included being good academically, and athletically and also being recognized socially at the school.

During this time, Dunlap lettered in football, hockey, and debating. The following year, Frank won the Gerry Boucher Memorial trophy for senior interscholastic football. He was the first person to win this trophy. He received a scholarship to attend the University of Notre Dame in South Bend, Indiana, to play football. However, in that same year, the attack on Pearl Harbor occurred. With the United States entering the war, the scholarship was canceled and Frank was unable to go to Notre Dame.

== Ice hockey ==
Frank decided to go to St. Michael's College in Toronto, where he studied commerce and finance. In addition to going to school, Frank was a member of the St. Michael's Majors (Toronto St. Michael's Majors) hockey team of the Ontario Hockey Association where he played for two seasons, helping his team reach the playoffs in both years. In 1942/43 he registered 8 goals and 6 assists in 11 games. In 1943/44, he registered 11 goals and 14 assists in 15 games. In that same year he was also called up to play for the Toronto Maple Leafs of the National Hockey League (NHL) where he would play 15 games. During his time in Toronto, he only played in home games because he was enrolled in school full time. During his hockey playing days he earned two nicknames. He was known to his teammates as "Judge" or "Biff".

During his football career in Ottawa, Frank continued to play hockey. In 1944-1945 he split the season between two teams. He played 24 games for the Ottawa Commandos where he scored 16 goals and registered 18 assists. He played the final 7 games for the Ottawa Navy. Both teams were part of the Quebec Senior Hockey League (QSHL). The following year, he played for the Hull Volants of the QSHL, scoring 17 goals and 19 assists. From 1946 to 1947 he played for the Ottawa Senators before playing for the Pembroke Lumber Kings and the Renfrew Lions of the Upper Ottawa Valley Hockey League. He stopped playing hockey after the 1948 season, however he continued to play football.

== Football ==
Frank returned to Ottawa where he finished his degree at St. Patrick's College (University) and played football for the Ottawa Trojans. Once the war ended, Dunlap then joined the Ottawa Rough Riders of the Canadian Football League (CFL) where he mainly played quarterback and halfback. Dunlap played with the Rough Riders for three years, from 1945 until 1947. He was named an all-star in 1946. He played with his younger brother, Jake Dunlap, during his years with the Rough Riders.

In 1948 Frank was accepted to Osgoode Hall Law School in Toronto and played for the Toronto Argonauts in both 1948 and 1949 while enrolled. He then returned to Ottawa to finish his football career. In 1950 under head coach Wally Masters, he played half-back instead of quarterback. The final year of his career came in 1951 as he captured a Grey Cup under head coach Clem Crowe.

== Post-playing career ==
Once his athletic career was over, Frank Dunlap practiced law in Ottawa with his brother, Jake, in their firm, Dunlap & Dunlap. On August 4, 1947, he married Kathryn Heney of Pembroke and later had four sons: David, Michael, Patrick, and Daniel. In 1957 he ran for the federal Liberal Party as a candidate in the Ottawa-Carleton area. The principles he advocated for included providing the armed forces with good training programs; giving children of service members and veterans educational assistance; giving farmers a voice in agricultural marketing; and working towards establishing adequate hospital facilities in the Ottawa-Carleton area. Dunlap was not elected, losing to Progressive Conservative, Dick Bell. In 1967 Dunlap was appointed a Judge, where he remained until his sudden death on September 26, 1993.

== Career statistics ==
=== Regular season and playoffs ===
			Regular season					Playoffs
Season	Team	League	GP	G	A	Pts	PIM	GP	G	A	Pts	PIM
1941–42	Ottawa St. Pats	OCJHL	—	—	—	—	—	7	9	8	17	4
1942–43	St. Michael's Majors	OHA	11	8	6	14	10	6	4	2	6	2
1943–44	Toronto Maple Leafs	NHL	5	0	1	1	2	—	—	—	—	—
1943–44	St. Michael's Majors	OHA	15	11	14	25	20	12	6	8	14	10
1944–45	Ottawa Commanders	QSHL	24	16	18	34	20	2	0	0	0	0
1945–46	Hull Volants	QSHL	33	17	19	36	0	—	—	—	—	—
1946–47	Ottawa Senators	QSHL	17	7	5	12	4	1	0	0	0	0
1946–47	Ottawa Senators	OCHL	1	1	3	4	0	—	—	—	—	—
1947–48	Pembroke Lumber Kings	UOVHL	14	10	12	22	2	5	4	1	5	2
1947–48	Renfrew Lions	Al-Cup	—	—	—	—	—	5	1	4	5	0
QSHL totals			74	40	42	82	24	3	0	0	0	0
NHL totals			5	0	1	1	2	—	—	—	—	—
