= Gherardo Hercolani Fava Simonetti =

Grand Commander of the Sovereign Military Order of Malta

His Excellency, Fra' Gherardo Hercolani Fava Simonetti
- Born: 1941 (age 84–85); Bologna, Italy
- Occupation: Knight of Malta
- Known for: Grand Commander of the Sovereign Military Order of Malta (2009–2011)

Gherardo Hercolani Fava Simonetti (born 1941) is an Italian who served as the grand commander of the Sovereign Military Order of Malta between 2009 and 2011. In this role, he acted as the religious superior for the professed knights, as well as the knights and dames in obedience.

== Biography ==
Hercolani was born in Bologna, the son of Don Filippo Rinaldo Hercolani Fava Simonetti and of his wife, Donna Francesca Cangini. He is the grandson of Count Antonio Hercolani Fava Simonetti, who was Lieutenant Grand Master of the Order of Malta from 1951 to 1955. His grandfather married Donna Marianna Fava Ghisilieri Simonetti, a descendant of the Simonetti from Ancona (Princes of Musone).

== Order of Malta ==
Hercolani joined the order in 1963 and became a Knight of Justice in 1977. He was elevated to the rank of Bailiff Grand Cross of Justice in 1986. He was the Councillor to the Sovereign Council between 1978 and 1983, the Grand Prior of Lombardy and Venetia between 1984 and 1994, a member of the Sovereign Council from 2006 to 2009, and also the President of the Order's Pilgrimages from 2007 to 2009.

He was elected as Grand Commander at the Chapter General on 12 February 2009. He was responsible for spreading the principles of the Faith, the supervision of the Priories and Subpriories, and the creation of reports for the Holy See. He also was responsible for the Magistral Palace Chapel. Simonetti resigned as Grand Commander of the Order in 2011 for health reasons.

== Distinctions ==
- Italy: Grand Officer of the Order of Merit of the Italian Republic (4 November 2008)
- Monaco: Grand Officer of the Order of Saint-Charles (14 October 2009)
- Sovereign Military Order of Malta: Grand Commander of the Sovereign Military Order of Malta

Catholic Church titles
Preceded by Frà Giacomo dalla Torre del Tempio di Sanguinetto	Grand Commander of Sovereign Military Order of Malta (SMOM); 2009–2011	Succeeded by Carlo d'Ippolito di Sant'Ippolito
