= Santa Maria del Priorato =

Church of St. Mary of the Priory
- Church of St. Mary on the Aventine
- Chiesa di Santa Maria del Priorato
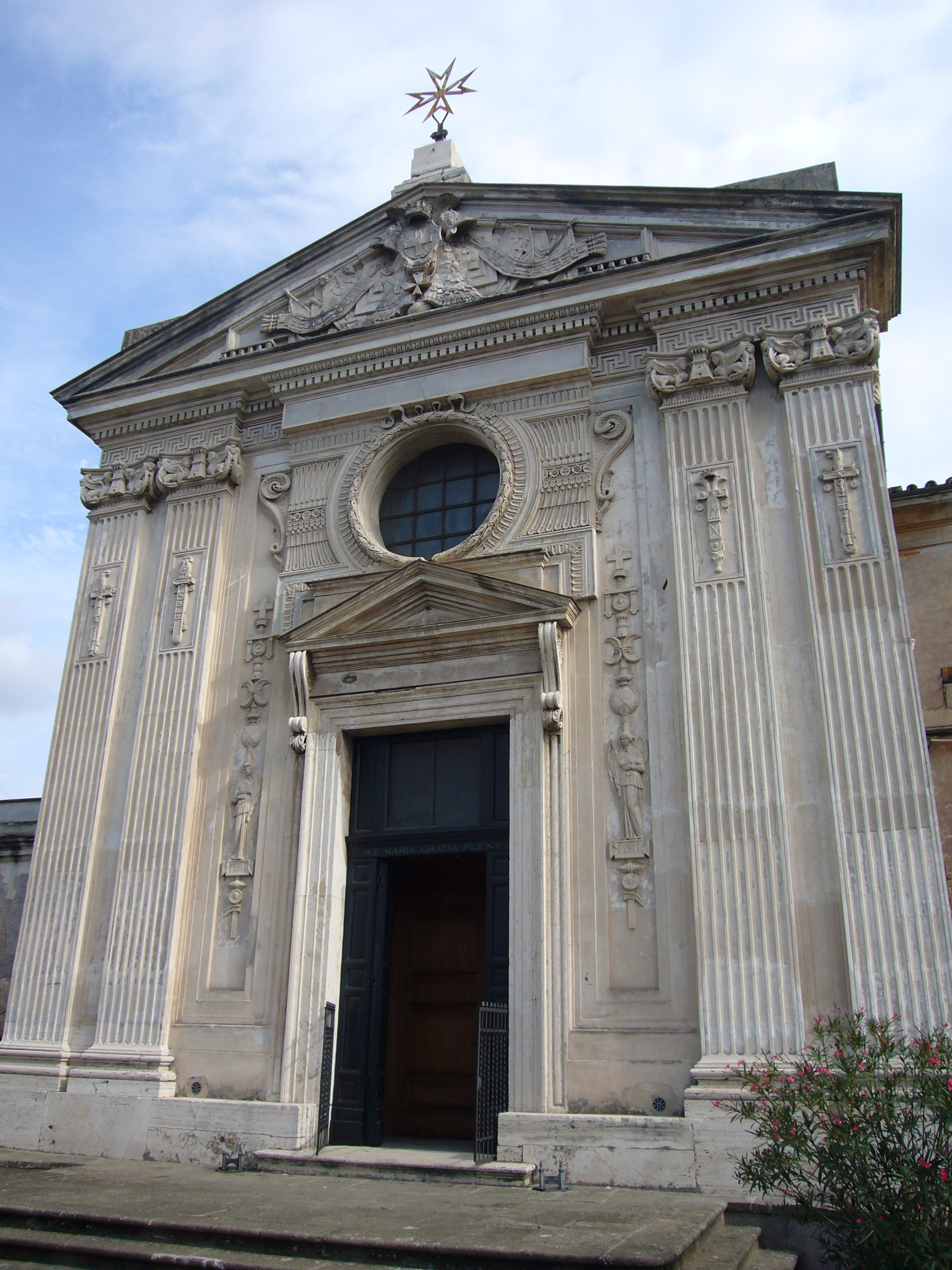
- Façade of the Church of Our Lady of the Priory
- Church of St. Mary of the Priory
- 41°52′59.8″N 12°28′38.6″E
- Location: Rome, Italy
- Denomination: Catholic
- Website: Official website

History
- Status: national church of Malta
- Founded: 939
- Founder: St. Odo of Cluny

Architecture
- Architect: Giovanni Battista Piranesi (renovation)
- Architectural type: Church
- Style: Neo-classical
- Years built: 1765
- Completed: 939 (original building), rebuilt 1550s, 1766 (renovation)

Specifications
- Length: 31 metres (102 ft)
- Width: 13 metres (43 ft)

The Church of St. Mary of the Priory (Italian: Chiesa di Santa Maria del Priorato), also known as St. Mary on the Aventine (Italian: Santa Maria in Aventino), is the monastery church of the Priory of the Knights of Malta on the Aventine Hill in Rome, and is dedicated to the Blessed Virgin Mary.

== History ==
The first church on this site was built in 939, when Odo of Cluny was given the Roman palace of Alberic II of Spoleto, which was then converted into a Cluniac Benedictine monastery. The young Hildebrand studied and took his first monastic vows here. When the monastery was dissolved in the 14th century, the site was acquired by the Knights of Malta, who had the church rebuilt in the 1550s.

In 1760, the papal nephew and Grand Prior of the Knights, Cardinal Giovanni Battista Rezzonico, sought to improve the appearance of the buildings. On a limited budget, the church was substantially renovated between 1764-66 according to the designs of Giovanni Battista Piranesi. It is his only architectural work. According to a 2019 account, he "consolidated the structure of the 16th-century church and raised the side walls...restored the vault and designed the decoration for its new aspect". Piranesi also designed the piazza in front of the church, the Piazza dei Cavaliere di Malta. The fairly low wall around the piazza is articulated by panels with paired obelisks with stelae positioned between them.

The Neo-Classical facade has paired fluted pilasters towards its edges to infer a temple front. The vertical linearity of the fluted pilasters act as a foil to enhance the more decorative reliefs of the facade. The reliefs on this facade, the entrance gate and the panels and stellae in the piazza include emblems and other references to the military and naval associations of the Knights of Malta and the Rezzonico family heraldry. The way in which they are represented indicates Piranesi's fascination with Rome's ancient past as they allude to motifs from Ancient Rome and Etruria.

The keyhole of the Priory, at 3 Piazza dei Cavalieri di Malta, is famous. Looking through it, one can see a fantastic panorama of the dome of St. Peter perfectly framed by the hedges of the Priorato gardens. The keyhole was deliberately placed here, as part of Piranesi's design.

== Interior ==
Piranesi's decoration of the church interior culminates in the very sculptural main altar. The altar, made of stucco, has a statue group of The Glory of St Basil of Cappadocia by Tommaso Righi. Piranesi provided the design, and Righi executed the great globe surrounded by putti in clouds, and Saint Basil in Glory supported by two angels. The church contains Piranesi's tomb and that of Bartolomeo Carafa (died 1405) designed by Paolo Romano.

The Complesso dell'Ordino dei Cavalieri di Malta (Compound of the Order of Knights of Malta) is next to the church. The Grand Priory of Rome (a division of the Knights of Malta) with support from the Fondazione Roma financed the restoration of both the interior and exterior that lasted from 2015 to 2019.

== Other Images ==
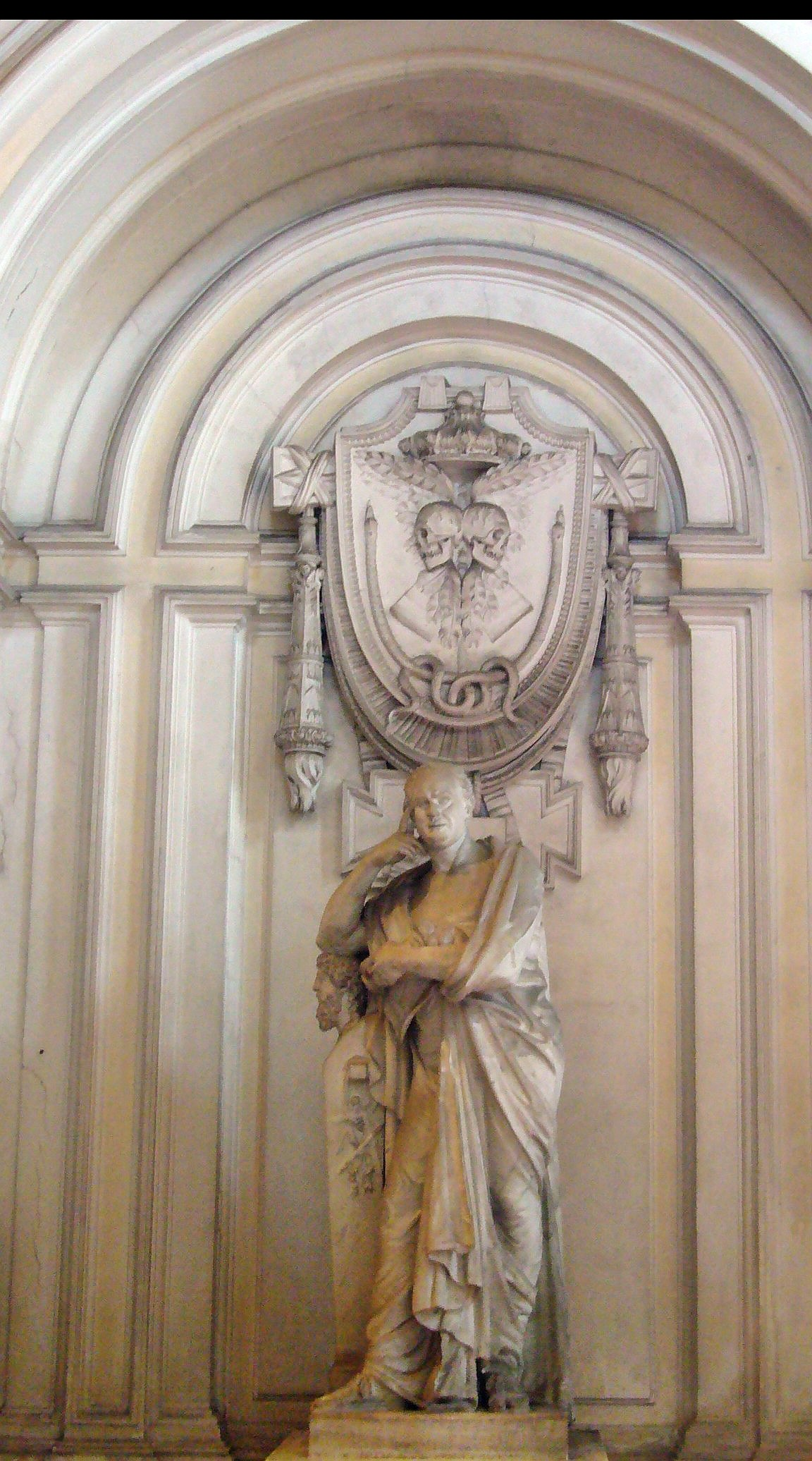
Funeral Monument of Piranesi

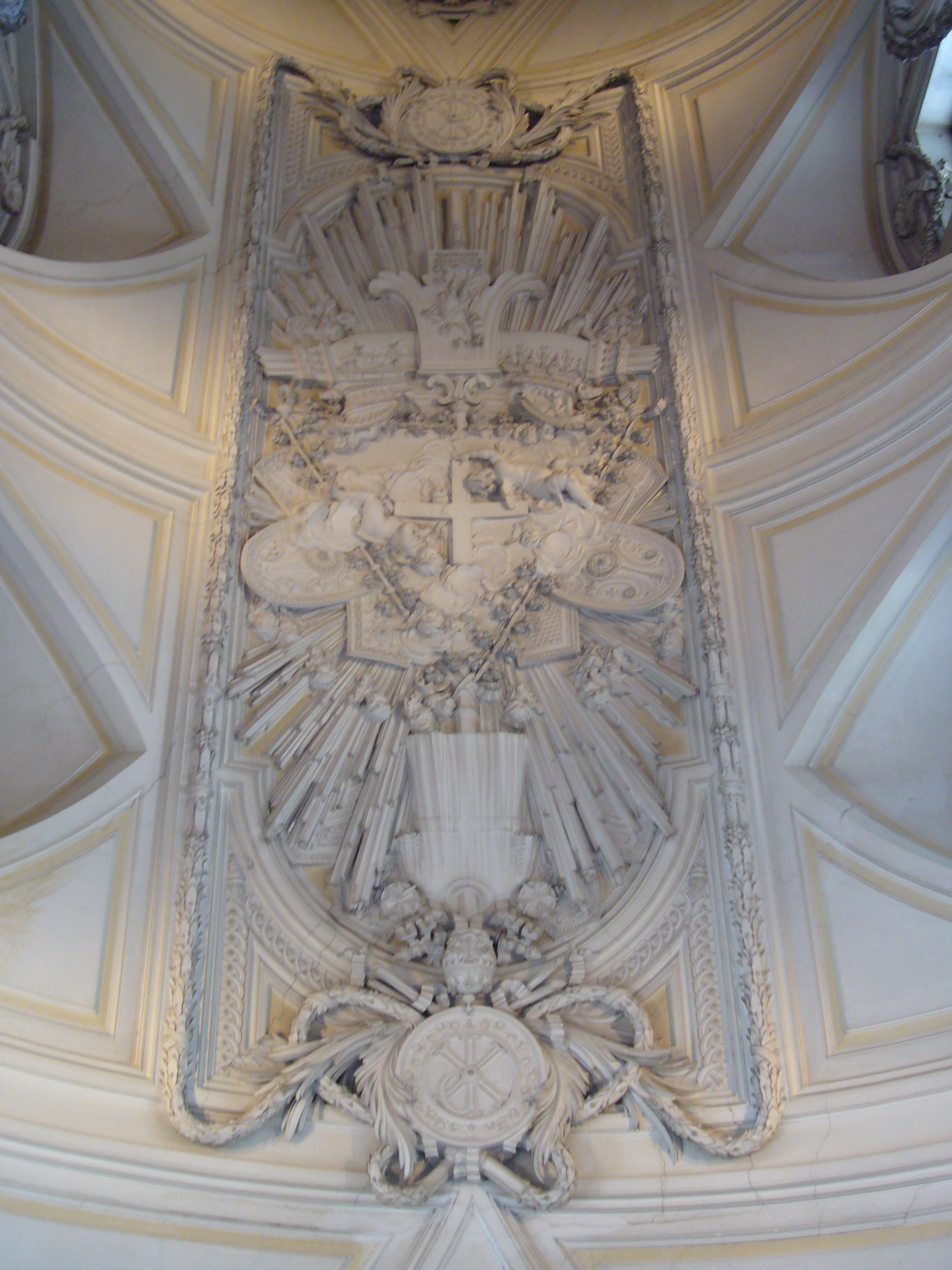
Detail of the central nave vault

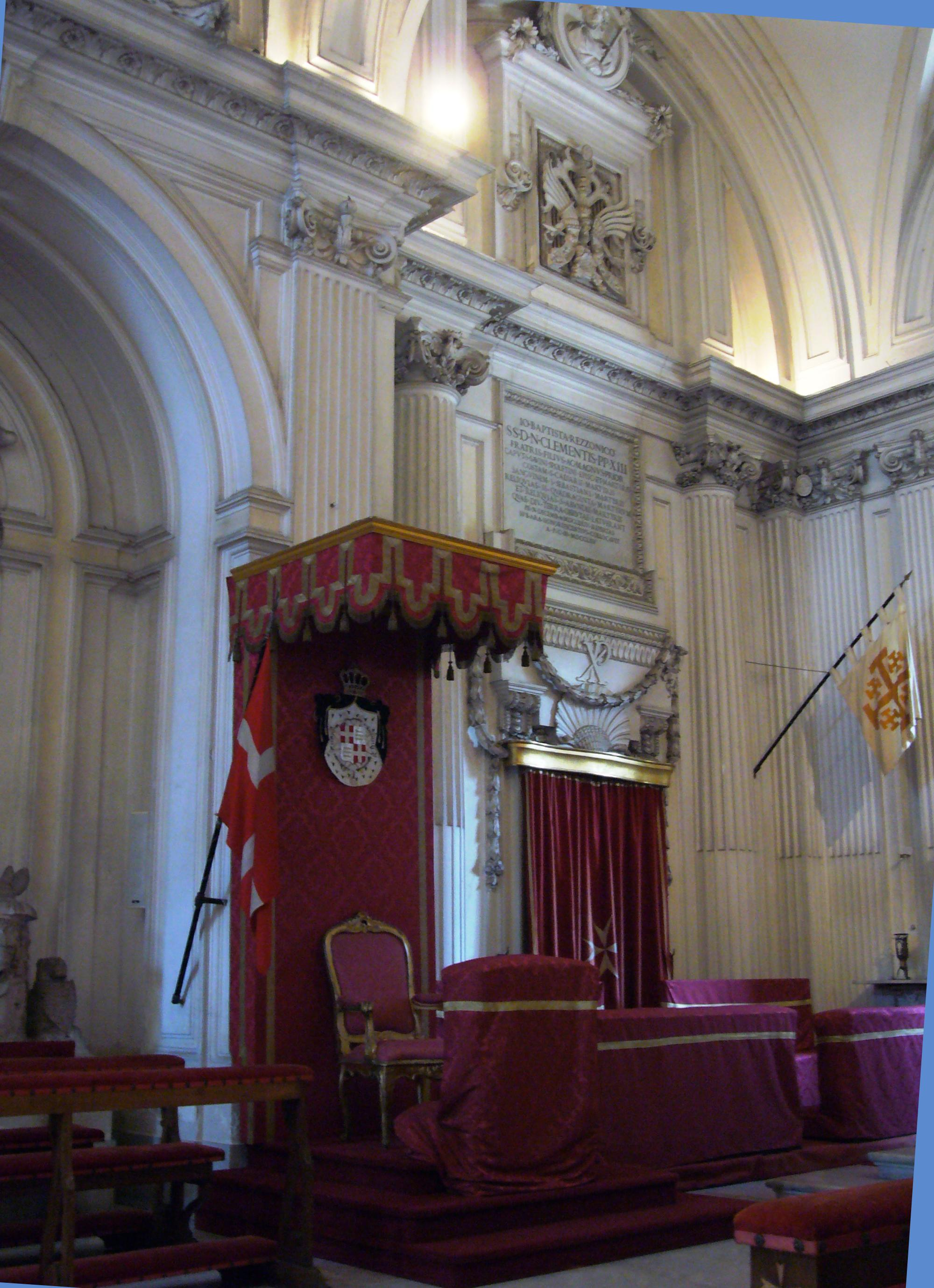
Throne of the Grand Master

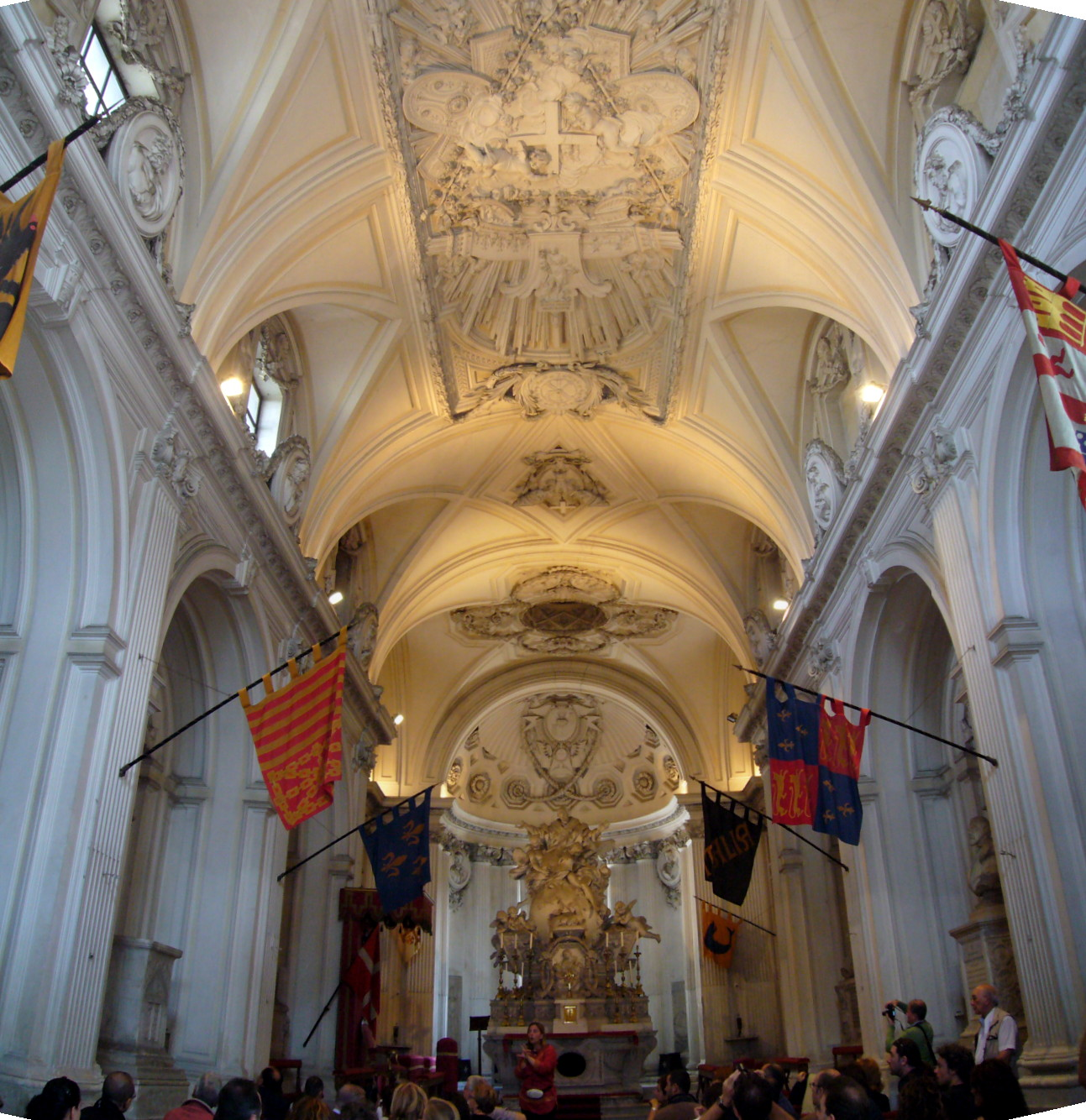
Interior

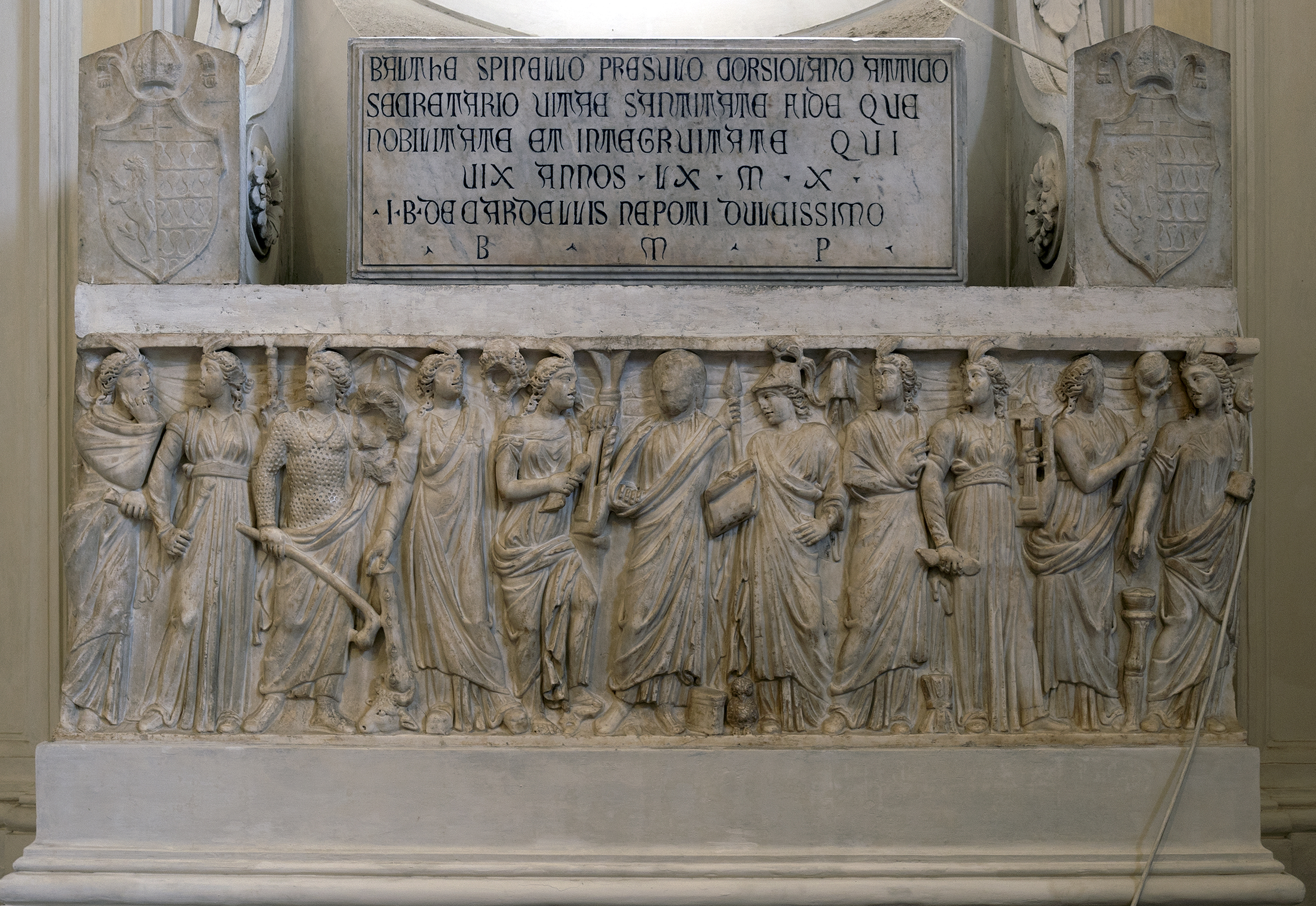
Muse Sarcophagus and Tomb of Bishop Spinelli

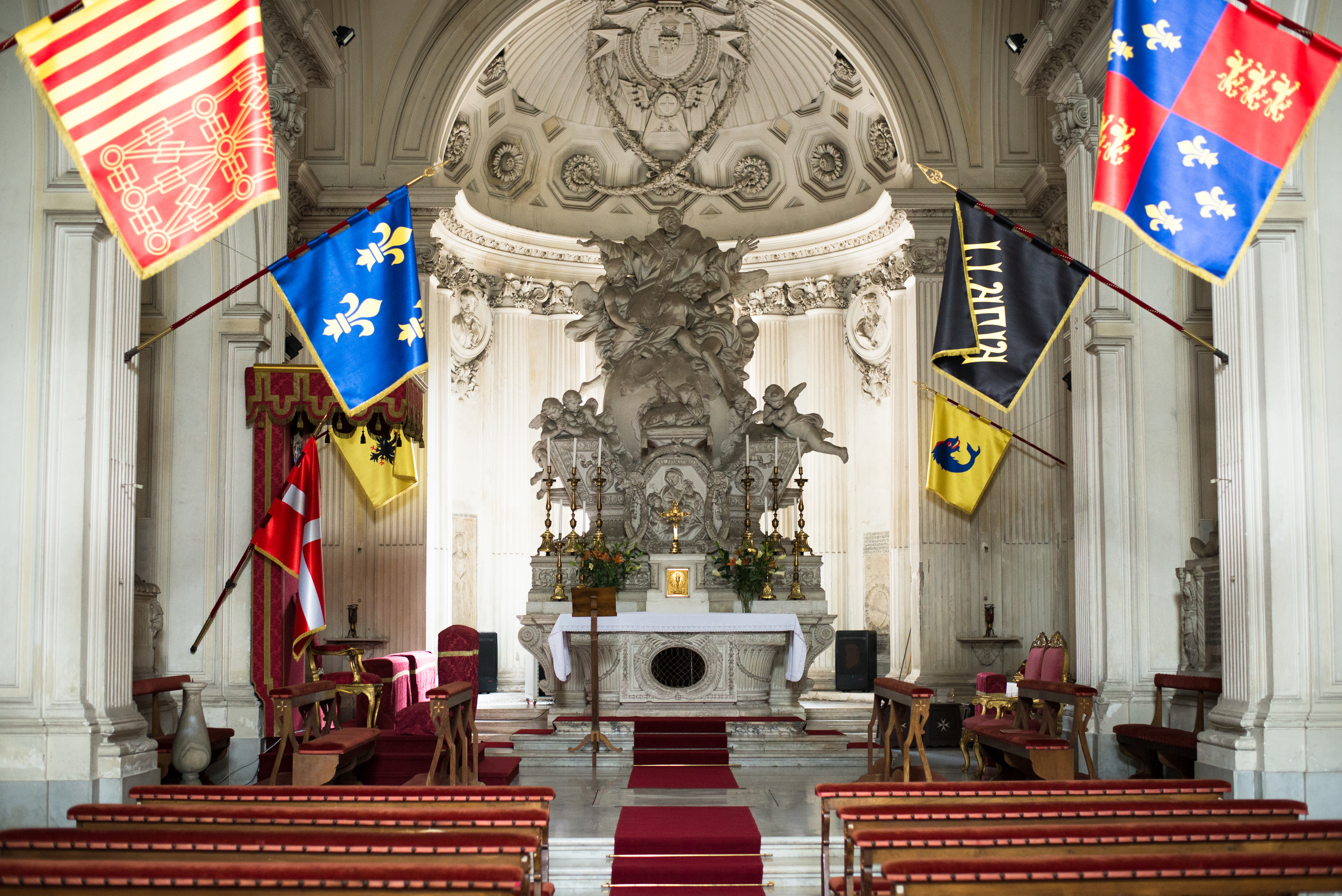
Main Altar
