= Emmanuel Rousseau =

French archivist and historian

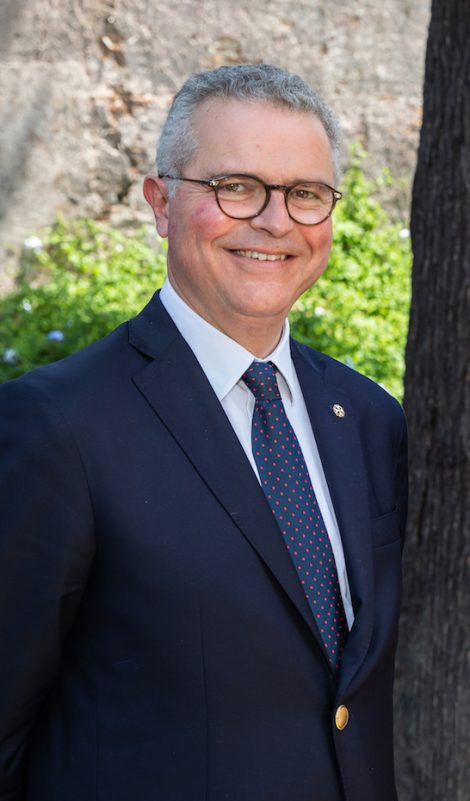

Grand Commander of the Sovereign Military Order of Malta
- Incumbent
- Assumed office 3 September 2022
- Appointed by: Pope Francis

Member of the Sovereign Military Order of Malta
- In office May 2019 – 3 September 2022

Personal details
- Born: Emmanuel-Frédéric-Gérard Rousseau; 30 June 1969 (age 57) Nancy, France
- Occupation: Archivist

Fra' Emmanuel-Frédéric-Gérard Rousseau (born 30 June 1969) is a French archivist.

== Life ==
Rousseau was born in Nancy in 1969, the son of Claude Rousseau, an engineer and an officer of the Order of Leopold II of Belgium.

He made his solemn vows as a full Knight of Justice on 11 May 2011 at the church Sainte-Élisabeth-de-Hongrie in Paris. A Knight Grand Cross of Justice, he was elected to a five-year term as a member of the Sovereign Council in May 2014. He was elected to a second five-year term as a member of the Sovereign Council in May 2019. That term ended when Pope Francis reorganized the leadership of the Sovereign Order of Malta on 3 September 2022 and appointed him Grand Commander of the Order of Malta. On 26 January 2023, he was elected to a six-year term in that office.

Rousseau is curator of the Magistral Libraries and Archives and Vice-President of the (French) Académie historique de l'Ordre de Malte. Dominique, Prince de La Rochefoucauld-Montbel, who was President of the French Association and Grand Hospitalier of the Order of Malta is now the President of the Académie.

Rousseau is President of the Historical Commission for the beatification of Empress Zita of Austria.

== Publications ==
- With Étienne Martin and Bruno Martin: Saints et Bienheureux de l’Ordre de Malte, 2014.
- With Laure Peureux, Olivier Cubourg, and Hugues Lefort: "L’Ordre de Malte pendant la Première Guerre mondiale", Soins 59, no. 786 (juin 2014): 80–82.
- Introduction to Valeria Vanesio, Il valore inestimabile delle carte: l'archivio del Sovrano Militare Ordine di Malta e la sua storia: un primo esperimento di ricostruzione. Roma: Tip. Mariti, 2014.

== Presentations ==
- "La vie spirituelle du Cardinal Tisserant", Colloque Le Cardinal Tisserant au service des Églises orientales, 21 octobre 2017, église Sainte-Élisabeth-de-Hongrie, Paris.

== Honours ==
- State decorations
  - Grand Officer, National Order of Merit, Romania, February 14, 2013.
- Others honours
  - Professed Knight Grand Cross of Justice of Solemn Vows of the Sovereign Military Order of Malta, May 11, 2011.
  - Grand Commander of the Sovereign Military Order of Malta, September 3, 2022.

== Referenced ==
Additional sources

- Marciano, Catherine. "A Knight of Malta and his millenary vocation". Agence France Presse. Archived from the original on 11 June 2019 – via Yahoo News.
