= Knight of Justice =

Rank of the Sovereign Military Order of Malta

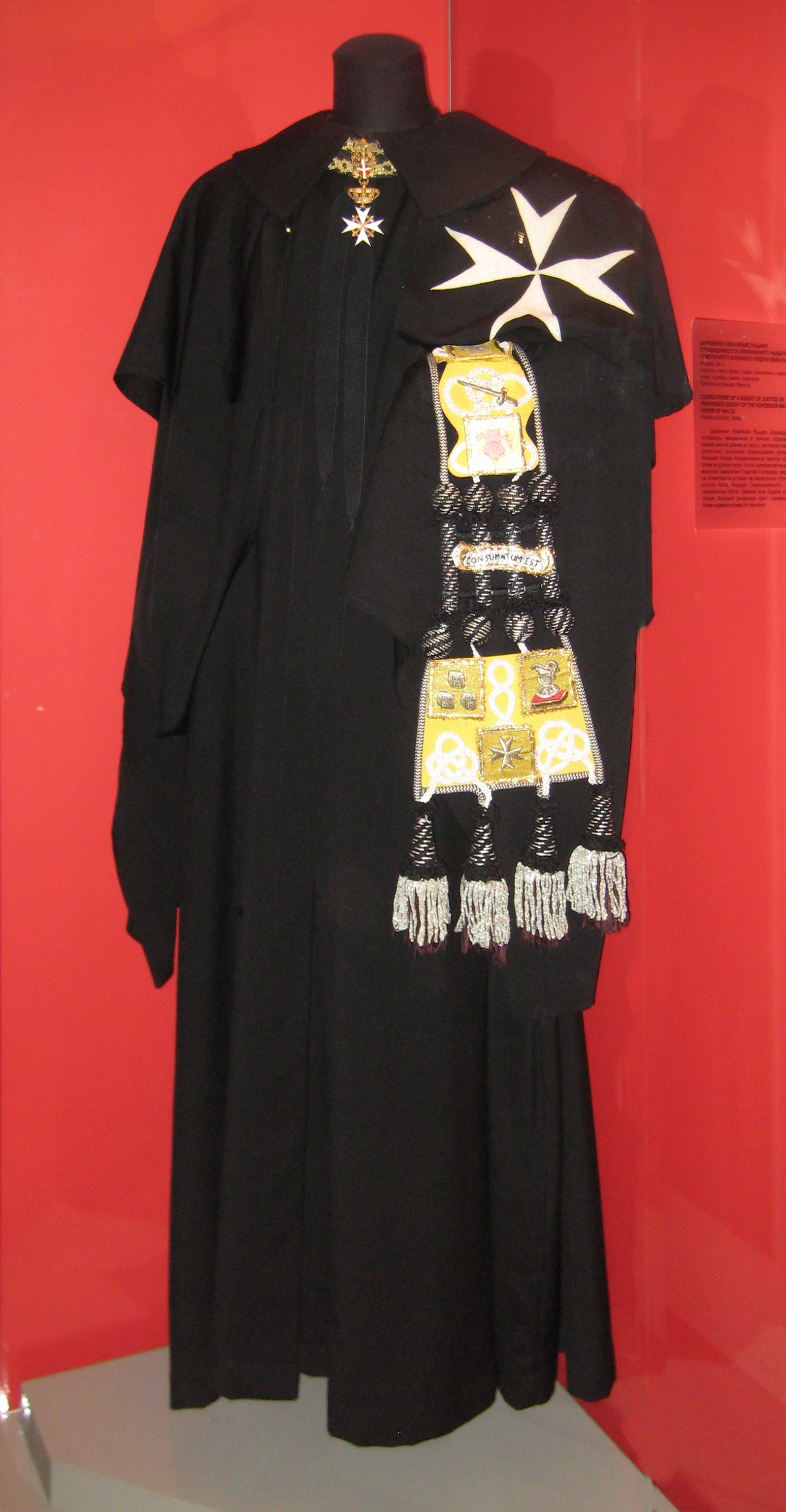
Church robes of a Knight of Justice with the scapular

The Knights of Justice or Professed Knights, from the first of the three classes of members of the Sovereign Military Order of Malta together with the professed conventual chaplains. They make vows of poverty, chastity, and obedience. According to the Order's Code, "they are religious in all respects and they comply with the universal and particular norms that concern them."

The religious superior of the Knights of Justice, under the Prince and Grand Master, is the Grand Commander, currently Fra' Emmanuel Rousseau. Most Knights of Justice are members of a Priory or Subpriory.

All Knights of Justice have the title Fra' (an abbreviation for the Latin word frater meaning brother). They are divided into the following ranks:

- Venerable Bailiff Knights Grand Cross of Justice Professed in Perpetual Vows
- Knights Grand Cross of Justice Professed in Perpetual Vows
- Commanders of Justice Professed in Perpetual Vows
- Knights of Justice Professed in Perpetual Vows
- Knights of Justice Professed in Temporary Vows
- Knights admitted to the Novitiate

Until 1989 all Knights of Justice had to be nobles, but, since then, non-noble Knights of Magistral Grace have been permitted to advance into the category of Justice. Until 2022 the Prince and Grand Master was elected from among the Knights of Justice who have the nobiliary requirements prescribed for the category of Knights of Honour and Devotion; this requirement no longer exists.

== Membership numbers ==
There are currently (2023) thirty-two Knights of Justice.

Historical membership numbers of professed knights

Year	Number
1871	36
1880	39
1895	46
1938	24
1968	24
1986	24
2026	35

== Prominent living Knights of Justice ==
The abbreviation S.A.E. stands for Sua Altezza Eminentissima, His Most Eminent Highness; it is used by the Prince and Grand Master.

The abbreviation S.E. stands for Sua Eccellenza, His Excellency; it is used by the members of the Sovereign Council, by grand priors, and by those knights who are bailiffs.

Name	Priory or Subpriory	Notes
S.A.E. Fra' John T. Dunlap		Prince and 81st Grand Master
S.E. Fra' Emmanuel Rousseau	Rome	Grand Commander
Fra' Francis Vassallo	Bohemia	Receiver of the Common Treasure
S.E. Fra' Richard Wolff	Our Lady of Lourdes	Member of the Sovereign Council
S.E. Fra' John Eidinow	England	Member of the Sovereign Council
S.E. Fra' Joao Augusto Esquivel Freire de Andrade	Naples and Sicily	Member of the Sovereign Council
S.E. Fra' Thomas Mulligan	Our Lady of Lourdes	Member of the Sovereign Council
S.E. Fra' Nicola Tegoni	Our Lady of Lourdes	Member of the Sovereign Council
S.E. Fra' Roberto Viazzo	Rome	Grand Prior of Rome
S.E. Ven. Balì Fra' Ruy Gonçalo do Valle Peixoto de Villas Boas	Rome	
Fra' Gherardo Hercolani Fava Simonetti	Rome	
Fra' Giovanni Scarabelli	Rome	Conventual Chaplain
Fra' Jean-Louis Mainguy	Rome	
S.E. Ven. Balì Fra' Angelo Chiastellaro	Lombardy and Venice	
S.E. Fra' Nicolò Custoza de Cattani	Naples and Sicily	Grand Prior of Naples and Sicily
Fra' Alessandro de Franciscis	Naples and Sicily	former Grand Hospitaller
Fra' Ignazio Toraldo di Francia	Naples and Sicily	
Fra' Luigi de Palma	Naples and Sicily	Chaplain
S.E. Fra' Pierre Melchior Henri de Bizemont	Bohemia	Grand Prior of Bohemia
Fra' Bertrand Allard de Sotteville de Villermont	Bohemia	
Fra' Julian Chadwick	Bohemia	
Fra' Jean Michel Furlan	Bohemia	
S.E. Fra' Gottfried von Kühnelt-Leddihn	Austria	Grand Prior of Austria
Fra' Leon Sireisky	Austria	Chaplain
Fra' Duncan Gallie	Austria	
S.E. Fra' Max Rumney	England	Grand Prior of England
Fra' Richard Berkley-Matthews	England	Chancellor of the Grand Priory of England
Fra' Ian Scott	England	former Grand Prior of England
Fra' Paul Caffrey	England	
Fra' Mathieu J. Dupont	Our Lady of Lourdes	
Fra' Guy de Lustrac		Member of the French Association

== Robes ==
The black church robe worn by the Knights of Justice has a different shape from that worn by the knights of the second and third classes. It is distinguished by the cross of Malta on the left side (not on the centre of the breast). The cross is completely white (not merely outlined in white).

The Knights of Justice in perpetual vows wear an additional garment called a scapular (but different in shape from other monastic scapulars). It hangs from the back of the neck like a yoke and wraps around the back and then rests over the left forearm (similar to a maniple). It has four large tassels and is embroidered in gold with the symbols of the Passion of Christ.

The red military uniform of the Knights of Justice is distinguished by a white collar, white lapels and white cuffs. The feathers of the feluca worn by Knights of Justice are white instead of black.

== Knights in minority ==
Until 1961 Knights of Justice could be admitted to the Order in minority, i.e. when they were children. This would give them seniority when applying for commanderies in the Order. Most of these Knights of Justice in minority did not take solemn vows when they became adults.

Prince Philipp of Liechtenstein (born 19 August 1946) and Prince Nikolaus of Liechtenstein (born 24 October 1947) were admitted as Knights of Justice in minority at the ages of four and three on 15 November 1950; Neither brother took vows as an adult; Prince Nikolaus is now a Knight of Honour and Devotion. The last Knight of Justice in minority was Count Franz-Alfred von Hartig, who was admitted 31 May 1951 when he was sixteen; he never took vows and is now a Knight in Obedience and the Order's ambassador to Romania.

== Other orders of knighthood ==
The term Knight of Justice is also used for a class of members in several other chivalric orders including the Sacred Military Constantinian Order of Saint George, the Johanniterorden (Rechtsritter), and the Most Venerable Order of the Hospital of Saint John of Jerusalem. However, these knights are not professed religious who have taken the vows of poverty, chastity, and obedience.
