= Sovereign Council of the Order of Malta =

Government body of the Sovereign Military Order of Malta

The Sovereign Council is the primary government body of the Sovereign Military Order of Malta which deals with the Order's regular business between the meetings of the Chapter General which occur every five years. Its powers and responsibilities are defined in the Order's Constitutional Charter and Code. It meets at least six times each year.

== Membership ==
The Sovereign Council is made up of the following members:

1. The Grand Master, or the Lieutenant
2. The holders of the four High Charges

a. The Grand Commander
b. The Grand Chancellor
c. The Grand Hospitaller
d. The Receiver of the Common Treasure

3. Five members of the Council of the Professed
4. Four members elected by the Chapter General from the members of the Order of the First and Second Classes.

The Grand Commander is the chief religious officer of the Order and serves as Lieutenant "ad interim" during a vacancy in the office of Grand Master. The Grand Chancellor is the head of the executive branch; he is responsible for the Diplomatic Missions of the Order and relations with the national Associations. The Grand Hospitaller coordinates the Order's humanitarian and charitable activities. The Receiver of the Common Treasure directs the administration of the finances and property of the Order.

All members of the Sovereign Council, other than the Grand Master, have the honorific address His Excellency (abbreviated H.E.; S.E. in Italian).

== Current members ==
The Prince and Grand Master:

- H.M.E.H. Fra' John T. Dunlap

The Four High Charges:

- H.E. Fra' Emmanuel Rousseau, Grand Commander
- H.E. Riccardo Paternò di Montecupo, Grand Chancellor
- H.E. Josef D. Blotz, Grand Hospitaller
- H.E. Fra’ Francis J. Vassallo, Receiver of the Common Treasure

Members of the Council of the Professed:

- H.E. Fra' Richard Wolff
- H.E. Fra' John Eidinow
- H.E. Fra' João Augusto Esquivel Freire de Andrade
- H.E. Fra’ Thomas N. Mulligan
- H.E. Fra' Nicola Tegoni

Members from the First and Second Classes:

- H.E. Francis Joseph McCarthy
- H.E. Michael Kirk Grace
- H.E. Clemente Riva di Sanseverino
- H.E. Joris Assueer Marie van Voorst tot Voorst
