= Angelo de Mojana di Cologna =

77th Prince and Grand Master of the Sovereign Military Order of Malta

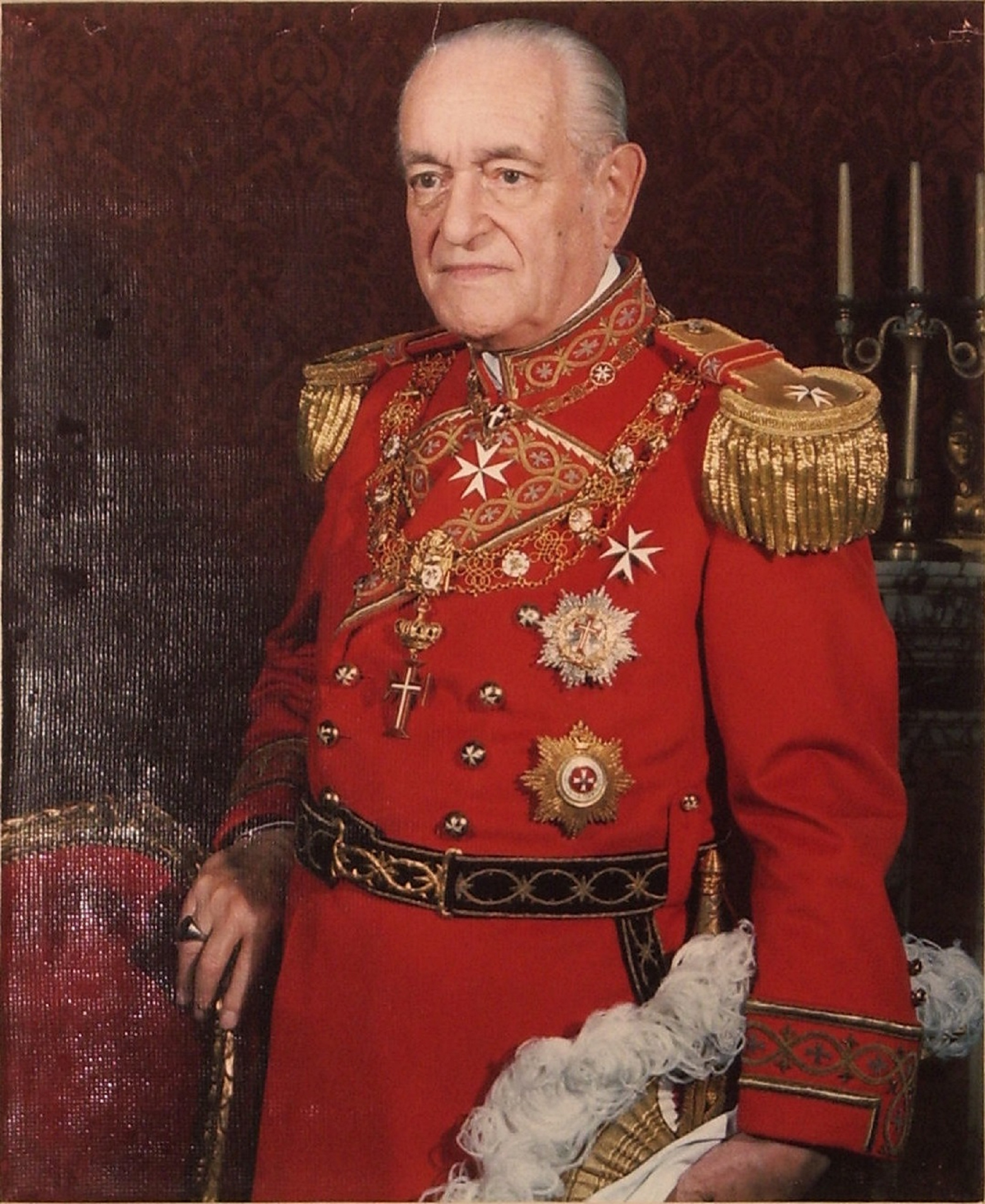
Fra' Angelo de Mojana di Cologna

Fra' Angelo de Mojana di Cologna (13 August 1905 – 18 January 1988) was an Italian nobleman, and Prince and Grand Master of the Sovereign Military Order of Malta from 1962 to 1988. He was born in Milan and died in Rome.

De Mojana was received as a Knight of Honour and Devotion in the Order of Malta on 7 December 1940. He took first vows as a Knight of Justice on 28 March 1950 and made his solemn profession on 1 April 1957. Throughout the 1950s, De Mojana was the principal legal adviser to the Order of Malta in its negotiations with the Sacred Congregation for Religious.

De Mojana was promoted to the rank of Commander of Justice on 1 January 1960, and was given the Commandery Estense Reggiana. He was elected Grand Master on 8 May 1962.

De Mojana made two official visits to France: in November 1964, he was received by President Charles de Gaulle; and on 27 April 1972, he was received at the Élysée Palace by President Georges Pompidou. He made an official visit to Malta in June 1968, and to Gabon in 1972.

De Mojana died of a heart attack at the Palazzo Malta on 18 January 1988.

== Postage stamps ==
The official postal service of the Order of Malta, the Poste Magistrali, was established during the tenure of De Mojana in 1966.

Appearances of Fra' Angelo on postage stamps
State	Date of issue	Occasion	Value	Description
Order of Malta	8 May 1972	10th anniversary of election	20 Grani	Pilgrimage of Fra' Angelo to Lourdes
Order of Malta	8 May 1972	10th anniversary of election	1 Scudo	Coat-of-arms of Fra' Angelo
Order of Malta	3 October 1978		2 Scudi	Reproduction of 5 Scudi gold coin of 1978 with bust of Fra' Angelo
Order of Malta	8 May 1982	20th anniversary of election	2 Scudi	Coat-of-arms of Fra' Angelo
Order of Malta	8 May 1982	20th anniversary of election	4 Scudi	Coat-of-arms of Fra' Angelo
Order of Malta	8 May 1987	25th anniversary of election	10 Scudi	Portrait of Fra' Angelo
Order of Malta	8 May 2012	50th anniversary of election	€2,20	Portrait of Fra' Angelo

== Honours and awards ==
=== Foreign countries ===
- France: Grand Cross of the Legion of Honour
- Holy See: Grand Collar of the Order of Pope Pius IX
- Holy See: Knight of the Supreme Order of Christ, 4 July 1987 (the last recipient of the order)
- Italy: Knight Grand Cross Decorated with the Grand Collar of the Order of Merit of the Italian Republic, 8 October 1962
- Portugal: Grand Cross of the Military Order of Christ, 21 September 1967
- Portugal: Grand Collar of the Order of Prince Henry, 2 September 1983
- Spain: Grand Cross of the Order of Charles III, 12 July 1965

=== Dynasties ===
- House of Bourbon-Two Sicilies: Bailiff Grand Cross with Collar of the Sacred Military Constantinian Order of Saint George, 10 July 1962
- House of Habsburg-Lorraine: Knight of the Austrian Order of the Golden Fleece, 30 November 1972
- House of Romanov: Knight of the Order of St. Andrew, 1963
- (Kingdom of Italy) House of Savoy: Knight of the Supreme Order of the Most Holy Annunciation, 1974
- (Kingdom of Italy) House of Savoy: Knight Grand Cross of the Order of Saints Maurice and Lazarus, 1974
- (Kingdom of Italy) House of Savoy: Knight Grand Cross of the Order of the Crown of Italy, 1974

Catholic Church titles
Preceded by Ludovico Chigi Albani della Rovere	Grand Master of the Sovereign Military Order of Malta; 1962–1988	Succeeded by Andrew Willoughby Ninian Bertie
