= Magisterial Palace =

Magisterial Palace may refer to:

- a building within Fort St. Angelo
- Grandmaster's Palace (Valletta)
- Palazzo Vilhena
- Palazzo Malta
