= Pie postulatio voluntatis =

1113 papal bull recognizing the Knights Hospitaller

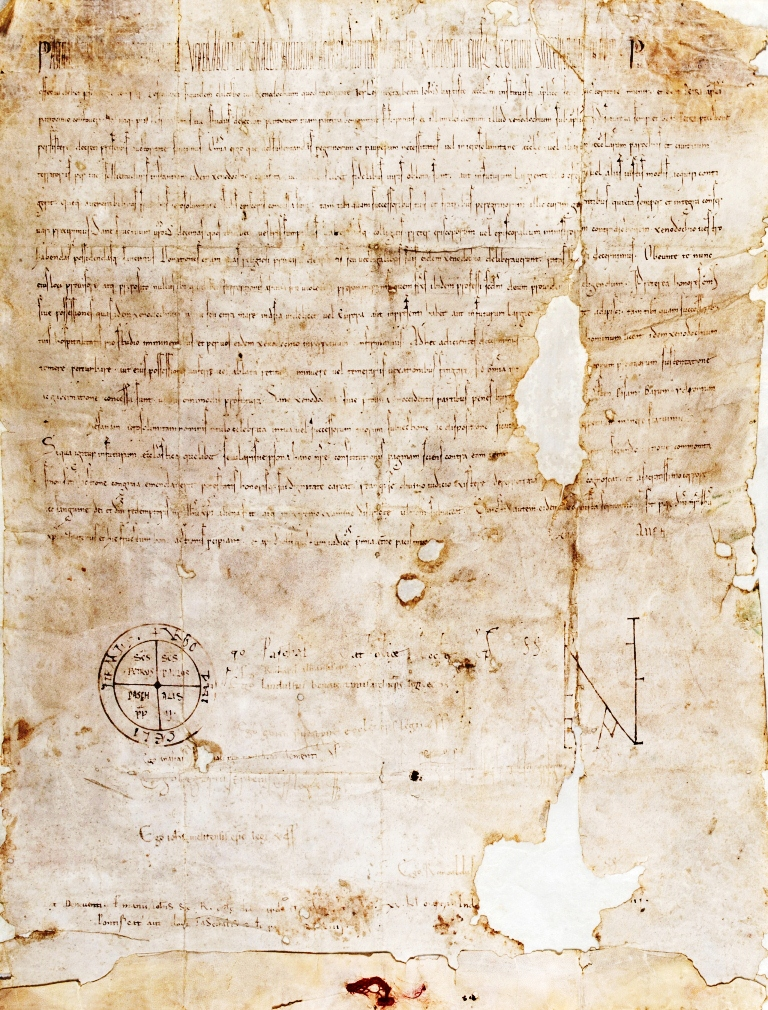
Pie postulatio voluntatis

Pie postulatio voluntatis (English: The Most Pious Request) is a papal bull issued on 15 February 1113 by Pope Paschal II, in which the Pope formally recognized the establishment of the Knights Hospitaller and confirmed their independence and sovereignty. Today, the document is preserved at the National Library of Malta in Valletta, Malta.

== Background ==
The origins of the Knights Hospitaller go back to around 1048, when the Fatimid Caliph Al-Mustansir Billah gave permission to merchants from the Republic of Amalfi to build a hospital in Jerusalem. The community which ran the hospital became independent during the First Crusade in around 1099, under the leadership of Grand Master Blessed Gerard.

== The bull ==
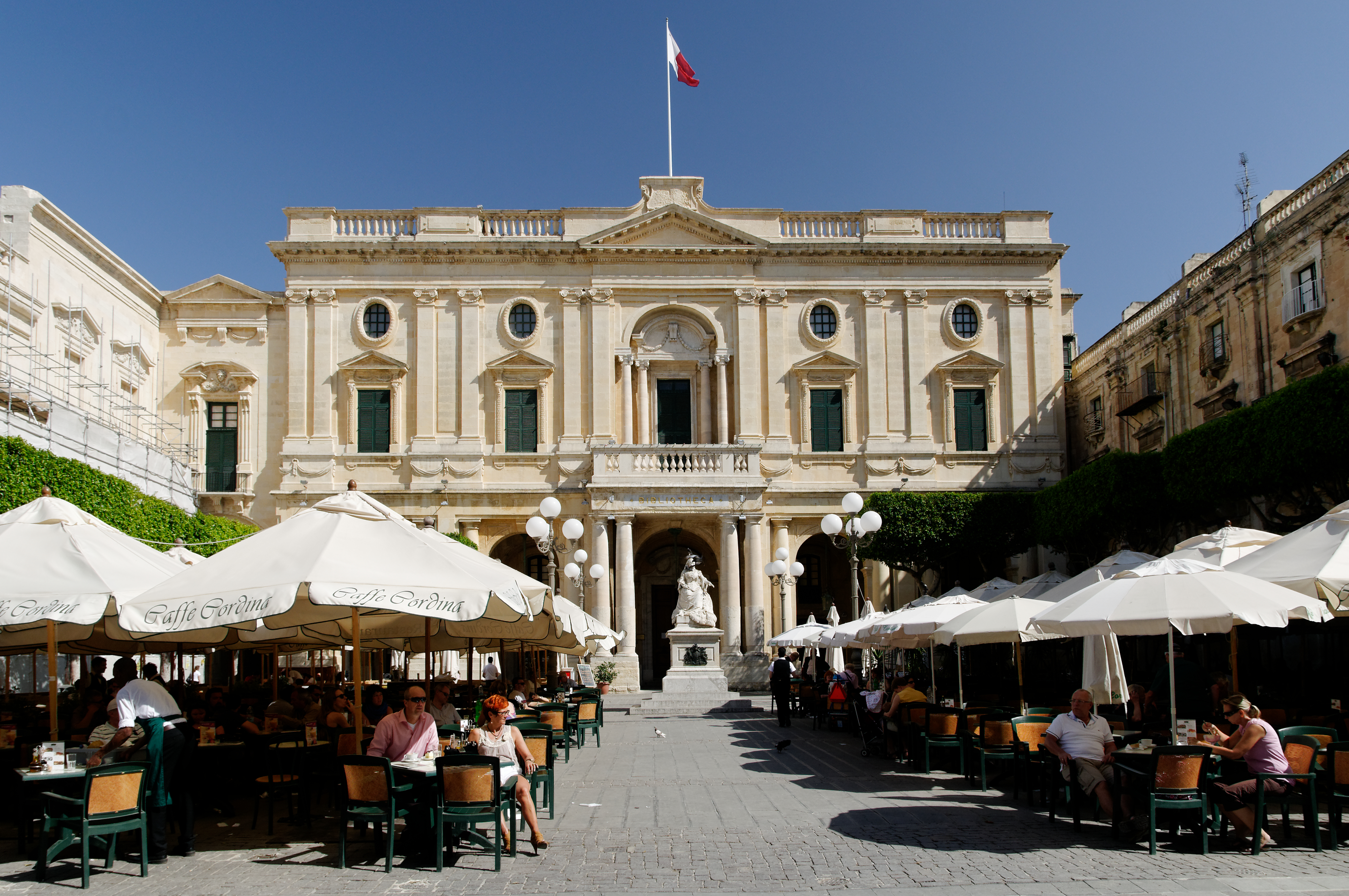
The bull is preserved at the National Library of Malta in Valletta

Pope Paschal II granted the bull to the Blessed Gerard on 15 February 1113. In it, the Pope formally recognized the foundation of the Hospital, which became a lay-religious order under the sole protection of the Church. The bull gave the Order the right to elect its Grand Masters without interference from external authorities. The knights of the Order were bound by three vows: poverty, chastity and obedience.

The bull formed the legal basis of the independence and sovereignty of the Order.

The document is preserved at the National Library of Malta in Valletta, Malta.

== Commemorations ==
The 900th anniversary of the papal bull was commemorated by the Sovereign Military Order of Malta (SMOM) with a two-day International Conference in Rome, which was attended by around 5,000 people. The conference began on 7 February 2013, and it ended on 9 February with a mass held by Cardinal Tarcisio Bertone at St. Peter's Basilica. The branches of the SMOM around the world also commemorated the anniversary with a number of initiatives.

Poste Magistrali, the Order's postal service, issued a set of two stamps and Malta's postal authority MaltaPost issued a miniature sheet to commemorate the anniversary.

== Full Text ==
Paschal, bishop, and servant of such as are the servants of God, to his venerable son Gerard, founder and Master of the Hospital at Jerusalem, and to his lawful successors for evermore.

The requests of a devout desire ought to meet with a corresponding fulfillment. Inasmuch, as of your affection thou hast requested, with regard to the Hospital which thou hast founded in the city of Jerusalem, in proximity to the Church of the Blessed John the Baptist, that it should be supported by the authority of the Apostolic See, and fostered by the patronage of the blessed Apostle Peter: We, therefore, much pleased with the pious earnestness of your hospitality, do receive the petition with our paternal favour, and do ordain and establish, by the authority of this our present decree, that that house of God, your Hospital, shall now be placed, and shall for ever remain, under the protection of the Apostolic See, and under that of the Blessed Peter. All things whatsoever, therefore, which by your preserving care and solicitude have been collected for the benefit of the said Hospital, for the support and maintenance of pilgrims, or for relieving the necessities of the poor, whether in the churches of Jerusalem, or in those of parishes within the limits of other cities; and whatsoever goods may have been offered already by the faithful, or for the future may through God’s grace be so offered, or collected by other lawful means; and whatsoever goods have been, or shall be granted to thee, or to thy successors, or to the brethren who are occupied in the care and support of pilgrims, by the venerable brethren the bishops of the diocese of Jerusalem; we hereby decree shall be retained by you and undiminished.

Moreover, as to the tithes of your revenues, which you collect everywhere at your own charge, and by your own toil, we do hereby fix and decree, that they shall be retained by your own Hospital, all opposition on the part of the bishops and their clergy notwithstanding. We also decree as valid all donations which have been made to your Hospital by pious princes, either of their tribute moneys or other donations. We ordain furthermore, that at your death no man shall be appointed in your place, as chief and master, by any underhand subtlety, or by violence; but him only who shall, by the inspiration of God, have been duly elected by the professed brethren of the Institution.

Furthermore, all dignities or possessions which your Hospital at present holds either on this side of the water, in Asia, or in Europe, as also those which hereafter by God’s bounty it may obtain; we confirm them to you and to your successors, who shall devote themselves with pious zeal to the cares of hospitality, and through you to the said Hospital in perpetuity. We further decree that it shall be unlawful for any man whatsoever rashly to disturb your Hospital, or to carry off any of its property, or if carried off to retain possession of it, or to diminish anything from its revenues, or to harass it with audacious annoyances. But let all its property remain intact, for the sole use and enjoyment of those for whose maintenance and support it has been granted. As to the Hospitals or Poor Houses in the Western provinces, in the Borgo of St.Egidio, Asti, Pisa, Bari, Otranto, Taranto and Messina, which are distinguished by the title of Hospitals of Jerusalem, we decree that they shall for ever remain, as they are this day, under the subjection and disposal of yourself and your successors. If, therefore, at a future time, any person, whether ecclesiastical or secular, knowing this paragraph of our constitution, shall attempt to oppose its provisions, and if, after having received a second or third warning, he shall not make a suitable satisfaction and restitution, let him be deprived of all his dignities and honours, and let him know that he stands exposed to the judgment of God, for the iniquity he has perpetrated; and let him be deprived of the Sacraments of the Body and Blood of Christ, and of the benefits of the redemption of our Lord, and at the last judgment let him meet with the severest vengeance. But to all who deal justly and rightly with the same, on them be the peace of our Lord Jesus Christ, so that not only here below they may receive the rewards of good actions, but also before the Judge of all mankind, they may enjoy the blessing of peace eternal.

Paschal, bishop of the Catholic Church, have signed

Richard Bishop of Albano, have signed

Landulphus Archbishop of Benevento, have read and signed

Canon Bishop of the Church of Preneste, have read and signed

Anastasio Cardinal priest with the title of Blessed Clement, have signed

Gregory Bishop of Terracina, have read and signed

John Bishop of Mellito, have read and signed

Romuald Cardinal Deacon of the Roman Church, have signed

Gregorio Cardinal priest of San Crisogono, have read and signed

Given at Benevento, by the hand of John, Cardinal and librarian of the Roman Church, on the 15th day of February, in the 6th cycle of indiction of the incarnation of our Lord, in the year 1113, and in the 14th year of the Pontificate of Pope Paschal II.

== See also ==
- Omne datum optimum, a similar bull which gave Papal protection to the Knights Templar
