= Chapter General of the Order of Malta =

Legislative body of the Knights of Malta

The Chapter General of the Order of Malta is the legislative body of the Sovereign Military Order of Malta. The Constitution describes it as "the supreme organ of governance of the Order." It meets every six years, mostly recently on 1-2 May 2019.

== Membership ==
The Chapter General is made up of the following members:

- the Grand Master who presides (or the Lieutenant ad interim or the Lieutenant of the Grand Master if there is no Grand Master,);
- the other thirteen members of the Sovereign Council;

The Grand Commander
The Grand Chancellor
The Grand Hospitaller
The Receiver of the Common Treasure
Five members of the Council of the Professed
Four members elected by the Chapter General from the members of the Order of the First and Second Classes

- the Prelate;
- twelve delegates of the Professed Knights and three delegates of the Professed Chaplains, elected by the Council of the Professed;
- the six Priors;
- two Professed Knights from each of the six Priories, elected by the respective Chapters of the Priories;
- the six Subpriors;
- two Professed Knights from each of the six Subpriories, elected by the respective Chapters of the Subpriories;
- fifteen Presidents of Associations, elected by the Presidents of the Associations;
- delegates elected by the Assemblies of the Priories, Subpriories and Associations, in a number proportional to the members belonging to them.

== Meetings ==
The Chapter General normally meets every six years and is convoked by the Grand Master.

It can also meet:

- when the Sovereign Council and the Council of the Professed think fit;
- by decision of a two-thirds majority of the Sovereign Council;
- when a majority of the Priories, Sub-priories and Associations make an application to the Grand Master.

The Chapter General met most recently 1-2 May 2019 with 62 members.

Its previous meetings were 30-31 May 2014 with 61 members, 8 June 2009 with sixty members, and 4-6 June 2004.

An Extraordinary Chapter General was held 28-30 April 1997 for the revision of the Constitutional Charter and Code.

== Responsibilities ==
The Chapter General has the following responsibilities:

- electing the four High Charges (Grand Commander, Grand Chancellor, Grand Hospitaller, Receiver of the Common Treasure)
- electing the other six members of the Sovereign Council
- electing the members of the Government Council
- electing the members of the Board of Auditors
- making amendments to the Constitution (by a two-thirds vote)
- making amendments to the Code (amendments to articles 6-93 also require a majority vote by the Knights of Justice who are members of the Chapter General)

== Membership from 1991 to 2022 ==
Before the promulgation of the 2022 Constitution, the Chapter General had the following members:

- the Grand Master who presides (or the Lieutenant ad interim or the Lieutenant of the Grand Master if there is no Grand Master,);
- the other ten members of the Sovereign Council;
- the Prelate;
- the six Priors (or the Procurator, Vicar, or Lieutenant, if the office of Prior is vacant);
- the Professed Bailiffs;
- two Professed Knights elected by the Chapter of each Priory (a Knight in Obedience may be substituted for one of the Professed Knights);
- a Professed Knight and a Knight in Obedience delegated by the Knights in gremio religionis (i.e. those not holding membership in any Priory or Sub-Priory);
- five Regents of the Sub-Priories, elected from the six Regents;
- fifteen representatives of the Associations, elected by the Presidents of the Associations;
- the six members of the Government Council.

== Structure before 1798 ==
Before the French invasion of Malta in 1798, the Chapter General had a slightly different composition and a somewhat different form of working.

The members included:

- the Grand Master
- the Bishop of Malta
- the Prior of the Conventual Church of Saint John
- the Conventual Bailiffs
- the Priors
- the Capitular Bailiffs
- the Bailiffs ad honores
- a Procurator for each Langue
- a Procurator for each Provincial Chapter.

Since it was considered that this body was too numerous for creating and establishing laws, the members of the Chapter General divided into the eight Langues. The members in each Langue then elected two of their number to form the Sixteen. The Sixteen were joined at their meetings by the Procurator of the Grand Master, the Vice-Chancellor, and the Secretary of the Treasury.

Each meeting of the Chapter General lasted fifteen days; the Sixteen could extend this term for an additional eight days.

The Code did not fix a particular frequency for meetings of the Chapter General. Instead, at the end of each meeting, a date was set for the next meeting. The Chapter General of 1631 ordered that the next meeting take place in 1641, but in fact it did not occur until 1776.
