= Portrait of a Knight of Malta =

c. 1515 painting by Titian

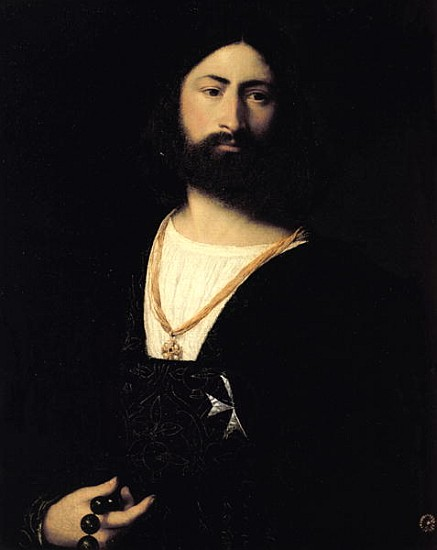
- Artist: Titian
- Year: c. 1515
- Medium: Oil on canvas
- Dimensions: 80 cm × 64 cm (31 in × 25 in)
- Location: Uffizi; Florence

Portrait of a Knight of Malta is an oil on canvas painting by Titian, from c. 1515. It depicts a knight belonging to the Order of Malta. It is now in the Uffizi, in Florence.

== History ==
The last bead of the rosary held by the knight bears the number XXXV (35), showing the subject's age at the time of the portrait. W.F. Dickes argued that he was Stefano Colonna da Palestrina, the condottiero who led the republican resistance during the siege of Florence. This attribution was accepted by some critics and questioned by others, since there is no information relating to the fact of Colonna being a knight.

Thanks to Paolo del Sera, his agent in Venice, cardinal Leopoldo de' Medici acquired several works by the Venetian school for his collection, which later became part of the Uffizi. Portrait of a Knight of Malta was one of these works, costing 300 piastres, showing it was already considered to be an autograph work. It was exhibited in the Tribuna in 1677 and attributed to Giorgione in 1709, as shown on a label on the back of the painting. It was then moved to the villa di Poggio a Caiano. After several subsequent moves, in 1798 it finally arrived back Uffizi.

Oxidisation in the paint in the 19th century made attribution difficult. Joseph Archer Crowe, Cavalcaselle and Giovanni Morelli could not decide on the work's artist, Otto Mündler (1869) argued it was by Pietro della Vecchia and Roberto Longhi that it was by Paris Bordone - other critics shifted between Giorgione and Titian as the artist. Stefano Scarpelli restored it in 1998, enabling it to be identified as an early Titian still with heavy influences from Giorgione.

== Description ==
The painting depicts a young man which emerges at half-length from a dark background. He has a beard and long hair according to the fashion of the time, and wears a black robe open to a white shirt and a silver cross pinned to his chest, which shows his membership in the order of the Knights of Malta. The bodice has elaborate silver embroidery. Near the edge of the painting, his right hand appears, holding the large beads of a rosary.

The face of the knight stands out from the background and the frame of his dark hair and beard, with a delicate nuance that recalls the work of Giorgione. The solid volume of the character and the skill in rendering the different reflections of the materials are instead very Titian-esque: from the soft woolly fabric of the dress to the shine of the shirt gathered by thick folds; from the softness of the hair to the brilliance of the multi-strand gold collar that hangs on the chest, ending in a pendant with pearls and an emerald, which also recalls the Maltese cross.

On the last bead of the rosary it can be read the number XXXV (35), which indicates the age of the man at the time of the portrait.

== Bibliography ==
- Francesco Valcanover, L'opera completa di Tiziano, Rizzoli, Milano 1969.
- Gloria Fossi, Uffizi, Giunti, Firenze 2004. ISBN 88-09-03675-1
