= Sovereign Military Order of Malta =

Catholic lay religious order

Sovereign Military Hospitaller Order of Saint John of Jerusalem, of Rhodes and of Malta Sovrano Militare Ordine Ospedaliero di San Giovanni di Gerusalemme, di Rodi e di Malta (Italian) Supremus Militaris Ordo Hospitalarius Sancti Ioannis Hierosolymitani, Rhodiensis et Melitensis (Latin)
- Flag Coat of arms
- Motto: Tuitio fidei et obsequium pauperum (Latin) "Defence of the faith and assistance to the poor"
- Anthem: Ave Crux Alba (Latin) "Hail, Thou White Cross"
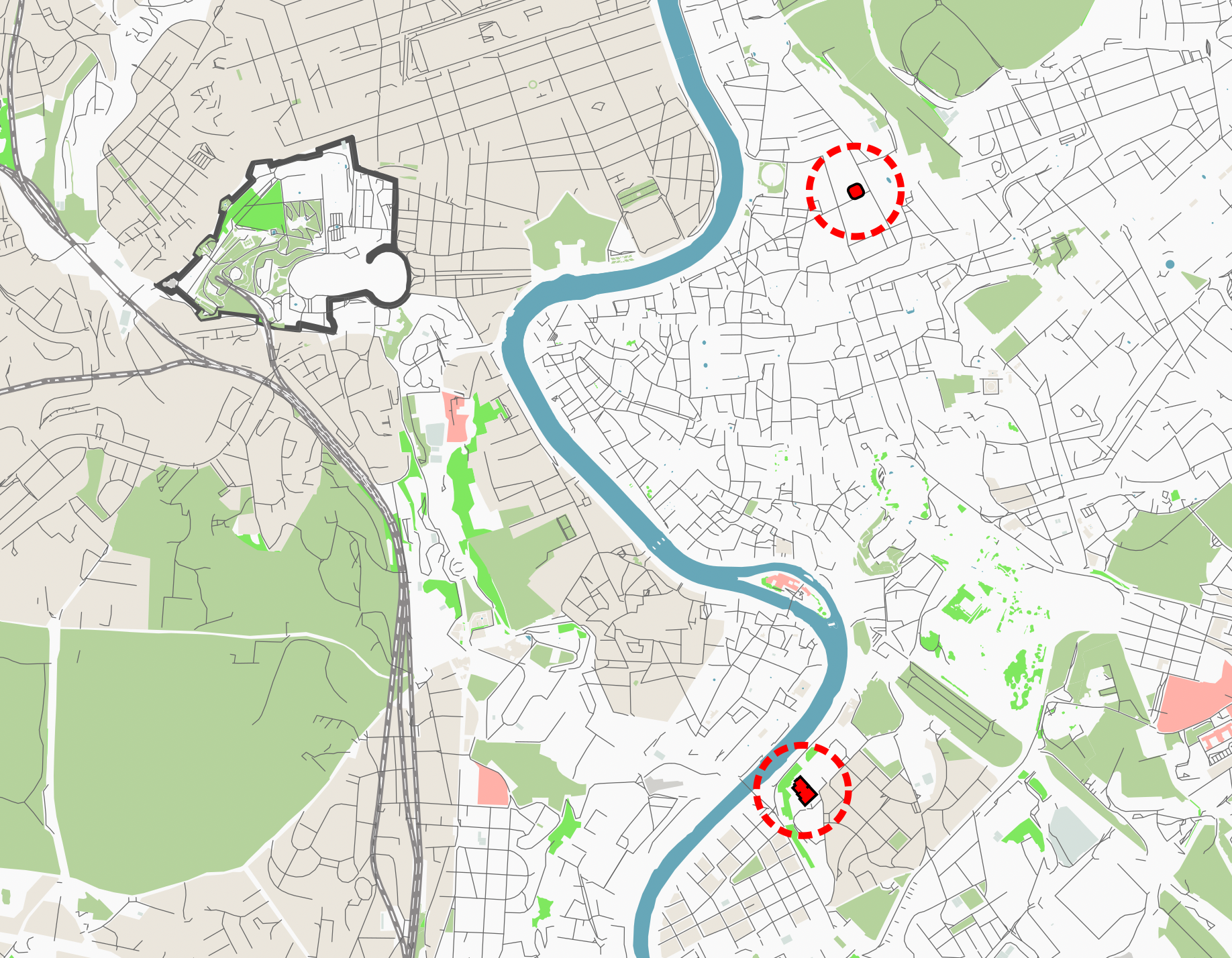
- Extraterritorial headquarters in Rome
- Seat: Rome (Palazzo Malta 41°54′19″N 12°28′50″E and Villa del Priorato di Malta 41°53′01″N 12°28′39″E)
- Official languages: Italian
- Religion: Roman Catholicism

Government
  - Prince & Grand Master: John T. Dunlap
  - Grand Commander: Emmanuel Rousseau
  - Grand Chancellor: Riccardo Paternò di Montecupo
  - Grand Hospitaller: Josef D. Blotz
  - Receiver of the Common Treasure: Francis J. Vassallo
- Legislature: Chapter General

Sovereign subject of international law
  - Establishment of the Knights Hospitaller: c. 1099; 927 years ago
  - Papal recognition: 1113
  - Cyprus: 1291–1310
  - Rhodes: 1310–1523
  - Malta: 1530–1798
  - Hospitaller Tripoli: 1530–1551
  - Principality of Heitersheim: 1548–1806
  - Hospitaller Caribbean colonies: 1651–1660
  - Division: 1805–1812
  - Seat in Rome: 1834–present

Area
  - Total: 0 km^{2} (0 sq mi)

Population
  - Estimate: 13,191 members (2023); 39 vowed members (33 knights; 6 chaplains); 3 citizens
- Currency: Maltese scudo
- Website www.orderofmalta.int

The Sovereign Military Order of Malta (SMOM), officially the Sovereign Military Hospitaller Order of Saint John of Jerusalem, of Rhodes and of Malta, (Note: Italian: Sovrano Militare Ordine Ospedaliero di San Giovanni di Gerusalemme, di Rodi e di Malta; Latin: Supremus Militaris Ordo Hospitalarius Sancti Ioannis Hierosolymitani, Rhodiensis et Melitensis) and commonly known as the Order of Malta or the Knights of Malta, is a Catholic lay religious order, traditionally of a military, chivalric, and noble nature. Though it possesses no national territory, the order is considered a sovereign entity under international law.

The order traces its institutional continuity with the Knights Hospitaller, a chivalric order that was founded about 1099 by the Blessed Gerard in the Kingdom of Jerusalem. The order is led by an elected prince and grand master. Its motto is Tuitio fidei et obsequium pauperum ("Defence of the faith and assistance to the poor").

The government of the Sovereign Order of Malta has a similar structure to national state governments. However, it also includes specific features associated with its nature as a lay religious order, as well as particular terminology evolved from nine centuries of history.

The order's membership includes about 13,500 Knights, Dames and Chaplains. Thirty-three of these are professed religious Knights of Justice. Until the 1990s, the highest classes of membership, including officers, required proof of noble lineage. More recently, a path was created for Knights and Dames of the lowest class (of whom proof of aristocratic lineage is not required) to be specially elevated to the highest class, making them eligible for office in the order.

The order's modern-day role is largely focused on providing humanitarian assistance and assisting with international humanitarian relations. The order employs about 52,000 doctors, nurses, auxiliaries and paramedics assisted by 100,000 volunteers in more than 120 countries, assisting children, homeless, disabled, elderly, and terminally ill people, refugees, and people with leprosy around the world without distinction of ethnicity or religion. (Note: The order's website says "its programmes include medical and social assistance, disaster relief in the case of armed conflicts and natural catastrophes, emergency services and first aid corps, help for the elderly, the handicapped and children in need and the provision of first aid training, and support for refugees and internally displaced persons regardless of race, origin or religion.") Through its worldwide relief corps, Malteser International, the order aids victims of natural disasters, epidemics and war.

The order maintains diplomatic relations with 115 states, enters into treaties, and issues its own passports, coins and postage stamps. Its two headquarters buildings in Rome enjoy extraterritoriality, and it maintains embassies in other countries. The three principal officers are counted as citizens. The order has been a United Nations General Assembly observer since 1994, granted in view of its "long-standing dedication [...] in providing humanitarian assistance and its special role in international humanitarian relations"; the same category is held by other non-state entities such as the International Olympic Committee and International Committee of the Red Cross.

== Name and insignia ==
The Order of Malta comprises a large number of Priories, Sub-priories, and National Associations around the world, but there also exist various organizations with similar-sounding names that are unrelated to the order. These include a number of mimic orders, such as masonic and non-Catholic organizations.

The order has two flags: the State Flag is rectangular with a red background, upon which there is a white Latin cross. The flag of the order's works is rectangular with a red background upon which there is a white eight-pointed Maltese cross.

The Grand Master displays a rectangular flag with a red background, upon which there is a white eight-pointed Maltese cross, encircled by the collar of the order and surmounted by a crown.

The coat of arms of the order, gules a cross argent (a white/silver cross on a red field), is most often depicted on an oval shield surrounded by a rosary, all superimposed on a white eight-pointed cross over a princely mantle surmounted by a crown.

In ecclesiastical heraldry of the Catholic Church, the Order of Malta is one of only two orders (along with the Order of the Holy Sepulchre) whose insignia may be displayed in a clerical coat of arms (laypersons having no such restriction). The shield is surrounded with a silver rosary for Professed Knights, or for others the ribbon of their rank. Some members may also display the Maltese cross behind their shield instead of the ribbon.

To protect its heritage against fraud, the order has legally registered sixteen versions of its names and emblems in some one hundred countries.

== History of the Order of Saint John ==
=== Founding ===
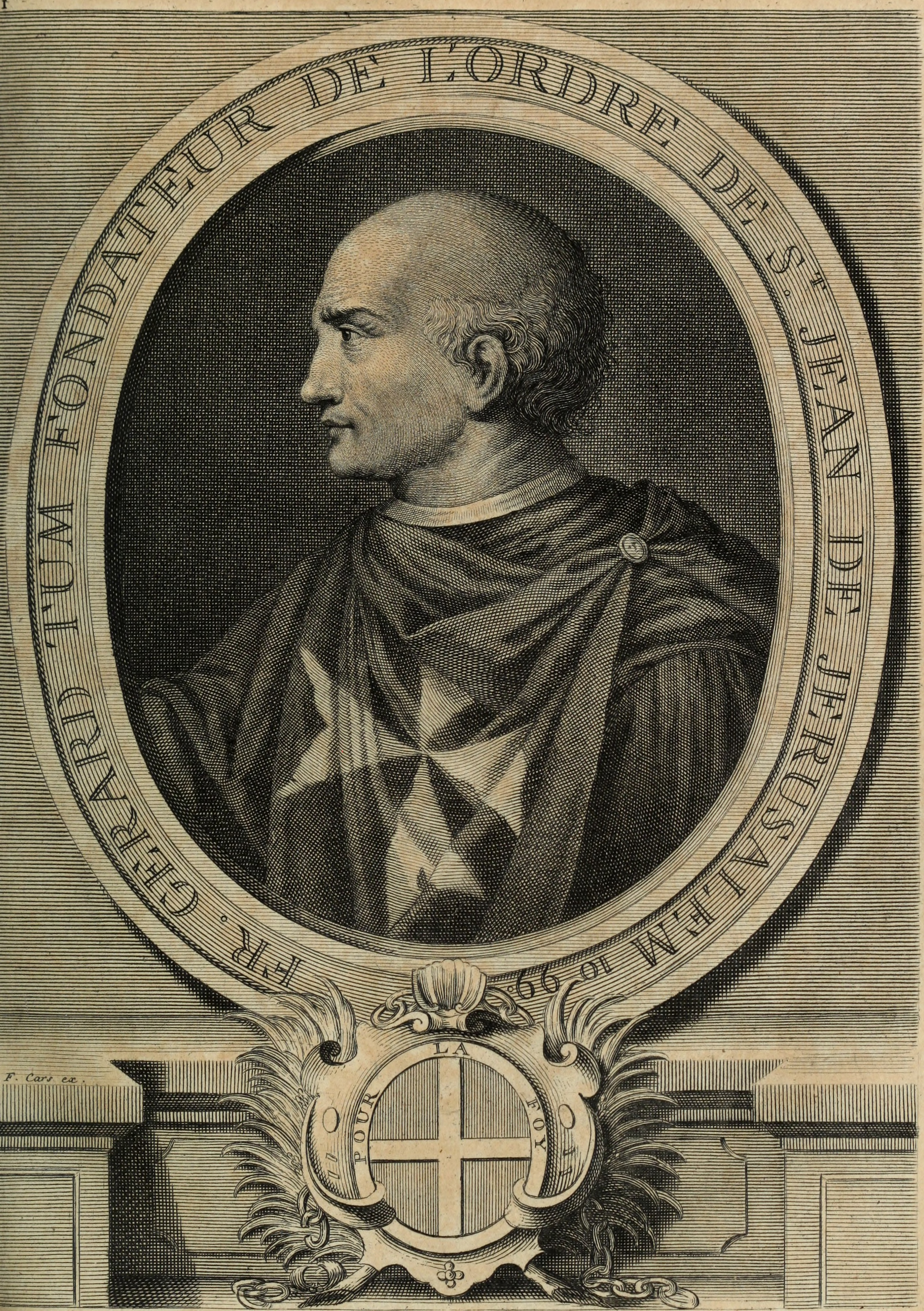
Blessed Gerard, founder of the Order of Saint John of Jerusalem. Copper engraving by Laurent Cars, about 1725.

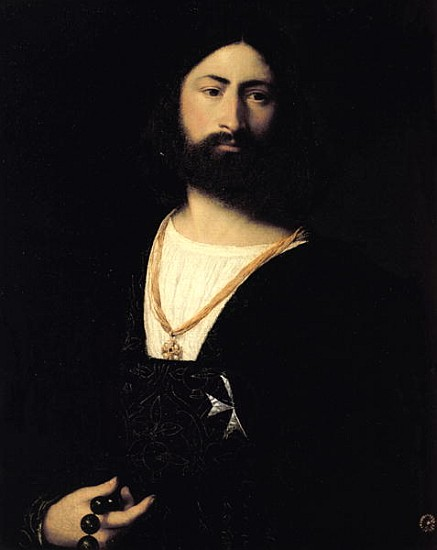
Portrait of a Knight of Malta by Titian, c. 1508, Uffizi

The birth of the Knights Hospitaller dates back to around 1048. Merchants from the ancient Marine Republic of Amalfi obtained from the Caliph of Egypt the authorisation to build a church, convent, and hospital in Jerusalem, to care for pilgrims of any religious faith or race. The Order of St. John of Jerusalem – the monastic community that ran the hospital for the pilgrims in the Holy Land – became independent under the guidance of its founder, the religious brother Gerard.

With the Papal bull Pie postulatio voluntatis dated 15 February 1113, Pope Paschal II approved the foundation of the Hospital and placed it under the aegis of the Holy See, granting it the right to freely elect its superiors without interference from other secular or religious authorities. By virtue of the Papal bull, the hospital became an order exempt from the control of the local church. All the Knights were religious, bound by the three monastic vows of poverty, chastity and obedience.

The constitution of the Christian Kingdom of Jerusalem during the Crusades obliged the order to take on the military defence of the sick, the pilgrims, and the captured territories. The order thus added the task of defending the faith to that of its hospitaller mission.

As time went on, the order adopted the white, eight-pointed Cross that is still its symbol today. The eight points represent the eight beatitudes that Jesus pronounced in his Sermon on the Mount.

=== Cyprus ===
When the last Christian stronghold in the Holy Land fell after the Siege of Acre in 1291, the order settled first in Cyprus.

=== Rhodes ===
In 1310, led by Grand Master Fra' Foulques de Villaret, the knights regrouped on the island of Rhodes. From there, the defense of the Christian world required the organization of a naval force, so the order built a powerful fleet and sailed the eastern Mediterranean, fighting battles for the sake of Christendom, including Crusades in Syria and Egypt.

In the early 14th century, the institutions of the order and the knights who came to Rhodes from every corner of Europe were grouped according to the languages they spoke. The first seven such groups, or Langues (Tongues) – from Provence, Auvergne, France, Italy, Aragon (Navarre), England (with Scotland and Ireland), and Germany – became eight in 1492, when Castile and Portugal were separated from the Langue of Aragon. Each Langue included Priories or Grand Priories, Bailiwicks, and Commanderies.

The order was governed by its Grand Master, the Prince of Rhodes, and its Council. From its beginning, independence from other nations granted by pontifical charter and the universally recognized right to maintain and deploy armed forces constituted grounds for the international sovereignty of the order, which minted its own coins and maintained diplomatic relations with other states. The senior positions of the order were given to representatives of different Langues.

In 1523, after six months of siege and fierce combat against the fleet and army of Sultan Suleiman the Magnificent, the walls collapsed from undermining explosives, and by a negotiated surrender the Knights left Rhodes carrying their arms.

=== Malta ===
The Battle of Lepanto (1571), unknown artist, late 16th century

The order remained without a territory of its own until 1530, when Grand Master Fra' Philippe de Villiers de l'Isle Adam took possession of the island of Malta, granted to the order by Emperor Charles V, Holy Roman Emperor and his mother Queen Joanna of Castile as monarchs of Sicily, with the approval of Pope Clement VII, for which the order had to honour the conditions of the Tribute of the Maltese Falcon.

In 1565, the Knights, led by Grand Master Fra' Jean de Valette (after whom the capital of Malta, Valletta, was named), defended the island for more than three months during the Great Siege by the Ottomans.

The fleet of the order contributed to the ultimate destruction of the Ottoman naval power in the Battle of Lepanto in 1571, led by John of Austria, half brother of King Philip II of Spain.

The Reformation, which split Western Europe into Protestant and Catholic states, affected the knights as well. In several countries, including England, Scotland, and Sweden, the order dissolved. In others, including the Netherlands and Germany, entire bailiwicks or commanderies (administrative divisions of the order) experienced Protestant conversions; these "Johanniter orders" survive in Germany, the Netherlands, and Sweden and many other countries, including the United States and South Africa. It was established that the order should remain neutral in any war between Christian nations.

From 1651 to 1665, the order ruled four islands in the Caribbean. On 21 May 1651 it acquired the islands of Saint Barthélemy, Saint Christopher, Saint Croix and Saint Martin. These were purchased from the French Compagnie des Îles de l'Amérique which had just been dissolved. In 1665, the four islands were sold to the French West India Company.

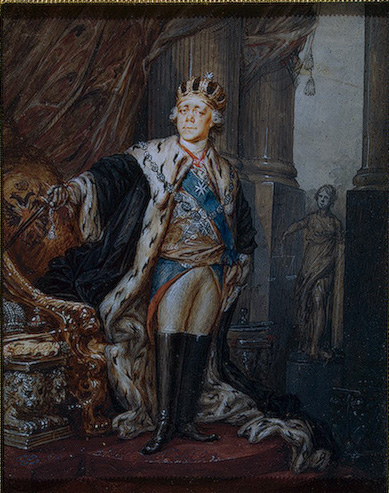
Emperor Paul of Russia wearing the Crown of the Grand Master of the Order of Malta (1799)

In 1798, Napoleon led the French occupation of Malta. Napoleon demanded from Grand Master Ferdinand von Hompesch zu Bolheim that his ships be allowed to enter the port and to take on water and supplies. The Grand Master replied that only two foreign ships could be allowed to enter the port at a time. Bonaparte, aware that such a procedure would take a long time and leave his forces vulnerable to British Admiral Horatio Nelson, immediately ordered a cannon fusillade against Malta. The French soldiers disembarked in Malta at seven points on the morning of 11 June and attacked. After several hours of fierce fighting, the Maltese in the west were forced to surrender.

Napoleon opened negotiations with the fortress capital of Valletta. Faced with vastly superior French forces and the loss of western Malta, the Grand Master negotiated a surrender to the invasion. Hompesch left Malta for Trieste on 18 June. He resigned as Grand Master on 6 July 1799.

The knights were dispersed, though the order continued to exist in a diminished form and negotiated with European governments for a return to power as part of the agreement between France and Holy Roman Empire during the German mediatisation. The Russian Emperor, Paul I, gave the largest number of knights shelter in Saint Petersburg, an action that gave rise to the Russian tradition of the Knights Hospitaller and the order's recognition among the Russian Imperial Orders. The refugee knights in Saint Petersburg proceeded to elect Tsar Paul as their Grand Master – a rival to Grand Master von Hompesch until the latter's abdication left Paul as the sole Grand Master. Grand Master Paul I created, in addition to the Catholic Grand Priory, a "Russian Grand Priory" of no fewer than 118 Commanderies, dwarfing the rest of the order and open to all Christians. Paul's election as Grand Master was, however, never ratified under Catholic canon law, and he was the de facto rather than de jure Grand Master of the Order.

By the early 19th century, the order was severely weakened by the loss of its priories throughout Europe. Only 10% of the order's income came from traditional sources in Europe, with the remaining 90% being generated by the Russian Grand Priory until 1810. This was partly reflected in the government of the order being under Lieutenants, rather than Grand Masters, in the period 1805 to 1879, when Pope Leo XIII restored a Grand Master to the order. This signaled the renewal of the order's fortunes as a humanitarian and religious organization.

=== Exile ===
The French forces occupying Malta expelled the Knights Hospitaller from the country.

During the seventeen years that separated the seizure of Malta and the General Peace, "the formality of electing a brother Chief to discharge the office of Grand Master, and thus to preserve the vitality of the Sovereign Institute, was duty attended to". The office of Lieutenant of the Magistery and ad interim of Grand Master was held by the Grand Baillies Count Nikolay Saltykov, Giovanni Battista Tommasi, Innico Maria Guevara-Suardo, Andrea Di Giovanni y Centellés, Carlo Candida and Count Filippo di Colloredo-Mels. Their mandates complexively covered the period until the death of the Emperor Paul in 1801.

The Treaty of Amiens (1802) obliged the United Kingdom to evacuate Malta, which was to be restored to a recreated Order of St. John, whose sovereignty was to be guaranteed by all of the major European powers, to be determined at the final peace. However, this did not happen because of objections to the treaty that quickly grew in the United Kingdom.

Bonaparte's rejection of a British offer involving a ten-year lease of Malta prompted the reactivation of the British blockade of the French coast; Britain declared war on France on 18 May.

The 1802 treaty was never implemented. The United Kingdom resumed hostilities citing France's imperialist policies in the West Indies, Italy, and Switzerland.

=== Sovereign Military Order of Malta ===
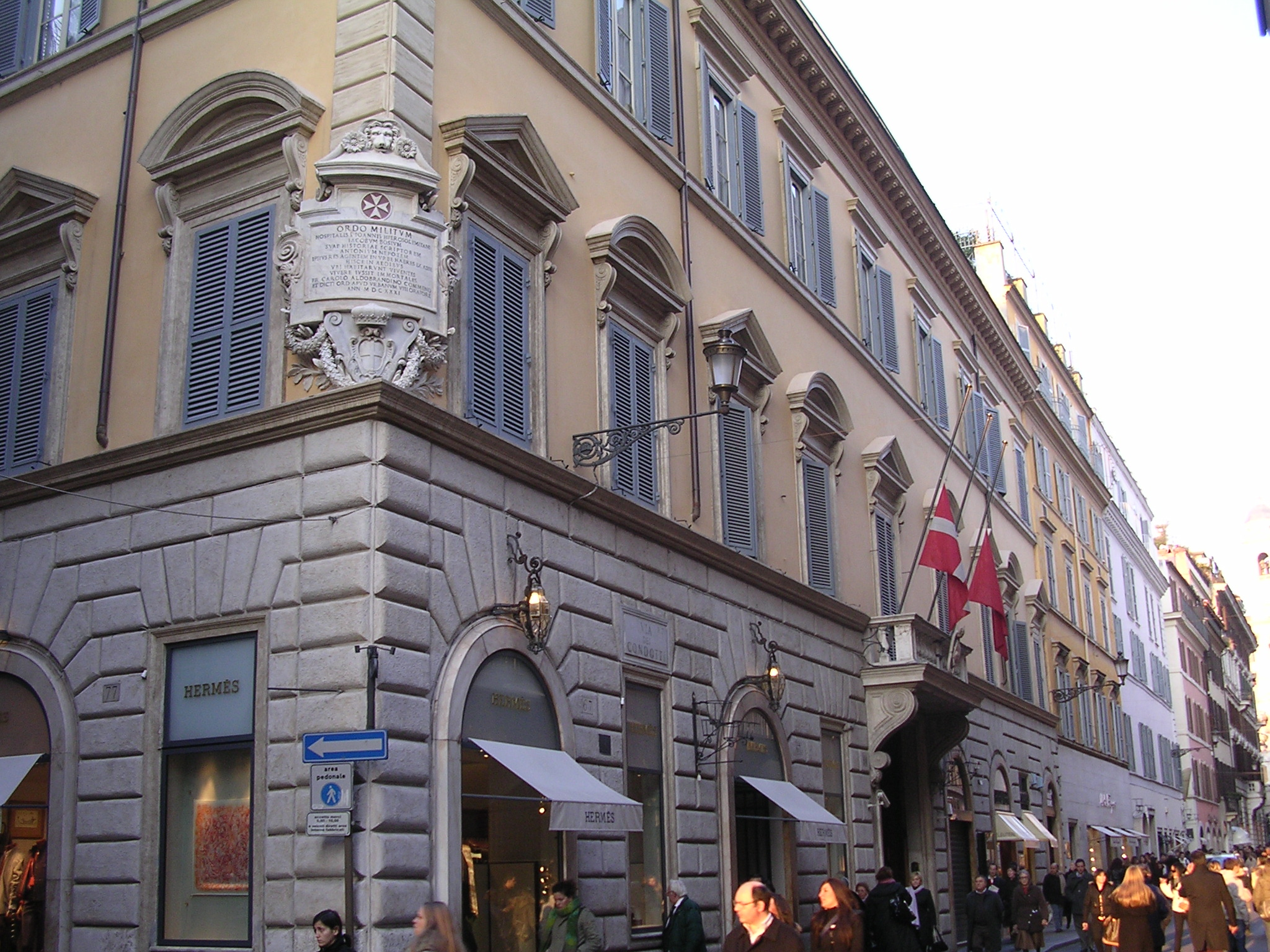
Palazzo Malta, Rome, Italy

The Congress of Vienna of 1815 confirmed the loss of Malta. After having temporarily resided in Messina, Catania and Ferrara, the seat of the order was moved to Ferrara in 1826 and to Rome in 1834. The Magistral Palace in Via Condotti 68 and the Magistral Villa on the Aventine Hill are recognised by the Government of Italy as having extraterritorial status. The grand priories of Lombardy-Venetia and of Sicily were restored from 1839 to 1841. The office of Grand Master was restored by Pope Leo XIII in 1879, after a vacancy of 75 years, confirming Giovanni Battista Ceschi a Santa Croce as the first Grand Master of the restored Order of Malta. However, the loss of possession of Malta during this period did not affect the right of active and passive legation for the order, which is legally important for the absolute continuity of international status, regardless of the former territorial possession.

The original hospitaller mission became the main activity of the order, growing ever stronger during the 20th century, most especially because of the contribution of the activities carried out by the Grand Priories and National Associations in many countries around the world. Large-scale hospitaller and charitable activities were carried out during World Wars I and II under Grand Master Fra' Ludovico Chigi Albani della Rovere (1931–1951). Under the Grand Masters Fra' Angelo de Mojana di Cologna (1962–1988) and Fra' Andrew Bertie (1988–2008), the projects expanded.

In February 2013, the order celebrated the 900th anniversary of its papal recognition with a general audience with Pope Benedict XVI and a Mass celebrated by Cardinal Tarcisio Bertone in Saint Peter's Basilica. The order has 95,000 volunteers.

=== Constitutional reform ===
The order experienced a leadership crisis beginning in December 2016, when Albrecht Freiherr von Boeselager protested his removal as Grand Chancellor by Grand Master Fra' Matthew Festing. Festing had removed Von Boeselager after other aid groups were found to have distributed condoms as part of a joint charitable project with the order's Malteser International to help sex slaves in Myanmar protect themselves from AIDS. In January 2017, Pope Francis ordered von Boeselager reinstated and required Festing's resignation. Francis also named Archbishop (later Cardinal) Giovanni Becciu as his personal representative to the order – sidelining the order's Cardinal Patron Raymond Burke – until the election of a new Grand Master. The pope effectively taking control over the order was seen by some as a break with tradition and the order's independence.

In May 2017, the order named Mauro Bertero Gutiérrez, a Bolivian member of the Government Council, to lead its constitutional reform process. In June 2017, in a departure from tradition, the leadership of the order wore a suit rather than full dress uniforms to their annual papal audience. In May 2018 when a new Grand Master was elected, Francis extended Becciu's mandate indefinitely. When the order's Chapter General met in May 2019 three of the 62 participants were women for the first time.

On 1 November 2020, Pope Francis named Archbishop (later Cardinal) Silvano Tomasi to replace Becciu as his Special Delegate to the order, reiterating the responsibilities of that office as his sole representative.

On 3 September 2022, Pope Francis promulgated the new constitution of the order and made provisional appointments to the Sovereign Council; he scheduled a convocation of the Extraordinary General Chapter for 25 January 2023, when regular appointments can be made in place of his provisional ones. On 26 January, the General Chapter elected to six-year terms on the Sovereign Council the same four members Francis had appointed the previous September and six of the nine Councillors he had named.

On 19 June 2023, Pope Francis named Cardinal Gianfranco Ghirlanda to succeed Burke as patron.

== Organisation ==
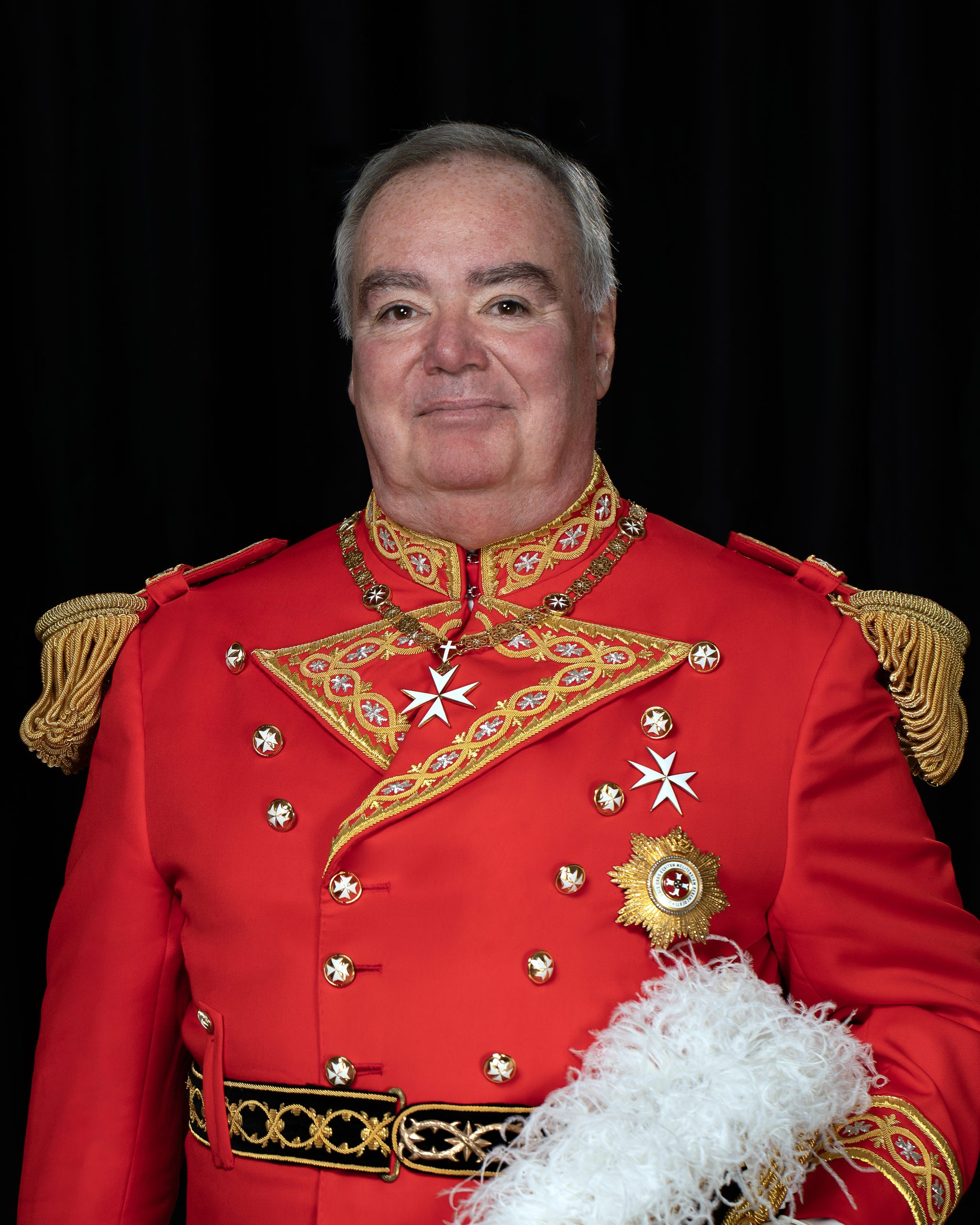
Fra' John T. Dunlap, 81st Prince and Grand Master

=== Governance ===
The proceedings of the order are governed by its Constitutional Charter and Code.

The prince and grand master is the head of the order and governs both as sovereign and as religious superior. He is "entitled to sovereign prerogatives and honors as well as the title of "Most Eminent Highness". He is elected to a term of ten years and may be elected to a second term, but may not serve beyond the completion of his 85th year. The prince and grand master is Fra' John T. Dunlap who was elected on 3 May 2023. "In the event of permanent impediment, resignation or death of the Grand Master, the order is governed by a Lieutenant ad interim in the person of the Grand Commander, who can only perform acts of ordinary administration without making any innovations." If it is not possible to elect a grand master, a lieutenant of the grand master is elected, who has the same powers as the grand master with the exception of the prerogatives of honour pertaining to a sovereign. Both the lieutenant ad interim and the lieutenant of the grand master are styled Eccellenza (Excellency).

The grand commander, who is responsible for religious and spiritual affairs and takes the role of Lieutenant ad interim in the event of the grand master's incapacitation, resignation or death.

The grand chancellor, who takes on the role of minister for foreign and internal affairs.

The grand hospitaller, who takes on the role of minister for humanitarian action and international cooperation, supervising the charitable and humanitarian actions of the order.

The receiver of the common treasure, who takes on the role of minister of finance in the order, supervising financial matters.

The Sovereign Council is the primary governing body of the order that handles regular business. The members are the Grand Master (or Lieutenant), the holders of the four High Officers, and the five Councilors of the Council of the Professed Knights, and four Councilors.

The Council of the Professed Knights "assists the Grand Master in the spiritual care of the order and in the governance of the First and Second Class". It includes the Grand Master (or Lieutenant), the Grand Commander, and five Councilors elected by the Chapter of the Professed.

The Chapter General is the legislative body of the order, which meets every six years. It elects the members of the Sovereign Council.

The Council Complete of State elects the Grand Master or the Lieutenant of the Grand Master.

The Board of Auditors audits the order's finances. It includes a President elected among the seven Councillors, all elected by the Chapter General.

The Government Council is the advisory board to the Sovereign Council in charge of studying political, religious, humanitarian assistance and international issues.

The order's judicial powers are exercised by a group of Magistral Courts, whose judges are appointed by the Grand Master and the Sovereign Council.

=== Regional divisions ===
The order is divided regionally into six Grand Priories, six Sub-Priories and 48 associations.

The six Grand Priories are:

- Grand Priory of Rome (founded 1214; expropriated 1808; restored 1816)
- Grand Priory of Lombardy and Venice (founded as two priories about 1180; expropriated 1796–1806; restored as a single priory 1839)
- Grand Priory of Naples and Sicily (founded as the Priory of Messina, the Priory of Barletta, and the Priory of Capua in the 12th and 13th centuries; suppressed 1806–1826; restored as a single priory 1839)
- Grand Priory of Bohemia (founded 1182)
- Grand Priory of Austria (separated from the Grand Priory of Bohemia 1938)
- Grand Priory of England (re-established 1993)

The six Sub-Priories are:

- Sub-Priory of St. Michael (Cologne, Germany)
- Sub-Priory of St. George and St. James (Madrid, Spain)
- Sub-Priory of Our Lady of Philermo (San Francisco, United States)
- Sub-Priory of Our Lady of Lourdes (New York, United States)
- Sub-Priory of The Immaculate Conception (Melbourne, Australia)
- Sub-Priory of St. Oliver Plunkett (Ireland)

=== National Associations of countries not mentioned above ===
Most of the 50 associations are national, but several countries (Brazil, Germany, the United States) have more than one association.

Until the beginning of the nineteenth century the order was divided regionally into Langues.

- Argentina
- Australia
- Belgium
- Bolivia
- Bolivia
- Brazil
- Canada
- Chile
- Colombia
- Costa Rica
- Cuba
- Dominican Republic
- Netherlands
- Ecuador
- El Salvador
- France
- Guatemala
- Honduras
- Hongkong
- Hungary
- Ireland
- Lebanon
- Malta
- Mexico
- Monaco
- Panama
- Paraguay
- Peru
- Philippines
- Poland
- Portugal
- Puerto Rico
- Romania
- Scandinavia
- Senegal
- Singapore
- Slovakia
- Slovenia
- Spain
- Switzerland
- Uruguay
- Venezuela

=== Membership ===
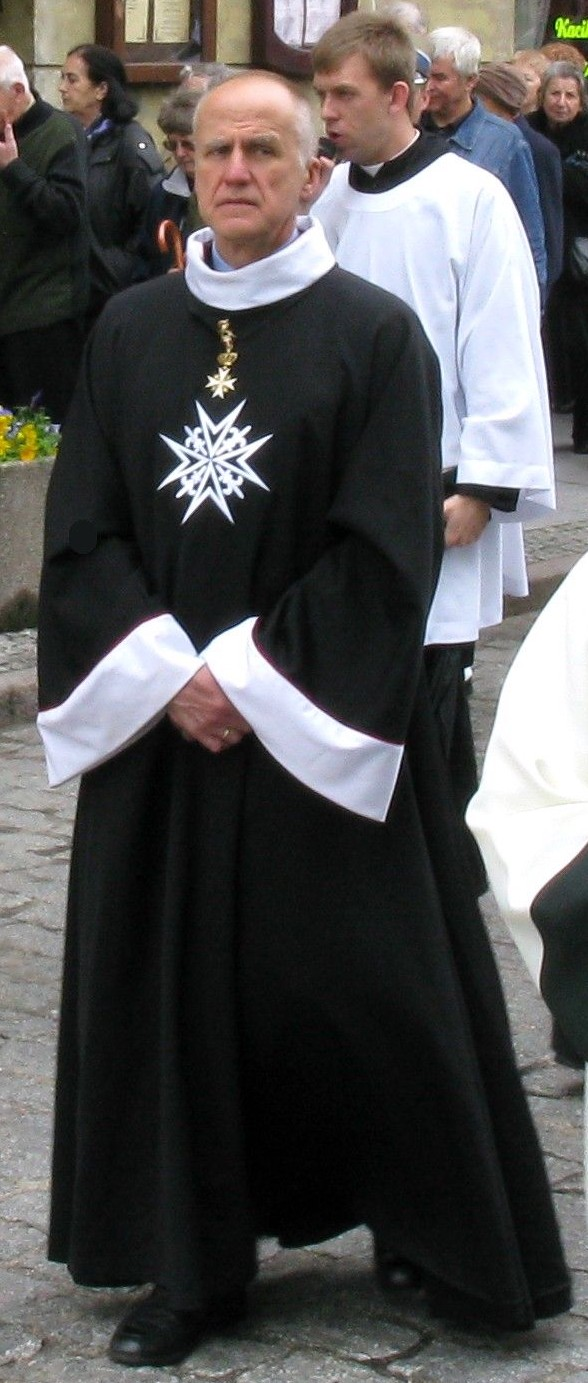
A Knight of Grace and Devotion in contemporary church robes

Membership in the order is divided into three classes each of which is subdivided into several categories:

- First Class, who make religious vows of poverty, chastity, and obedience:
  - Knights of Justice or Professed Knights
  - Professed Conventual Chaplains

There are currently (2023) 33 Knights of Justice and six Professed Conventual Chaplains.

- Second Class: Knights and Dames in Obedience make a Promise of Obedience:
  - Knights and Dames of Honour and Devotion in Obedience
  - Knights and Dames of Grace and Devotion in Obedience
  - Knights and Dames of Magistral Grace in Obedience

There are currently (2023) 541 Knights in Obedience and 137 Dames in Obedience.

- Third Class, who make no vows or promises, but live according to the principles of the Church and the order:
  - Knights and Dames of Honour and Devotion
  - Conventual Chaplains ad honorem
  - Knights and Dames of Grace and Devotion
  - Magistral Chaplains
  - Knights and Dames of Magistral Grace
  - Donats (male and female) of Devotion

There are currently (2023) 12,395 members of the Third Class.

Within each class and category of knights there are ranks of Knight, Knight Grand Cross, and Bailiff Knight Grand Cross.

=== Religious officers ===
==== Cardinal Patron ====
The Cardinalis Patronus (Cardinal Patron), who is either a cardinal when appointed by the pope or soon raised to that rank, promotes the spiritual interests of the order and its members, and its relations with the Holy See.

- Paolo Giobbe (8 August 1961 – 3 July 1969)
- Giacomo Violardo (3 July 1969 – 17 March 1978)
- Paul-Pierre Philippe, O.P. (10 November 1978 – 9 April 1984)
- Sebastiano Baggio (26 May 1984 – 21 March 1993)
- Pio Laghi (8 May 1993 – 11 January 2009)
- Paolo Sardi (6 June 2009 – 8 November 2014)
- Raymond Burke (8 November 2014–19 June 2023)
- Gianfranco Ghirlanda (19 June 2023–present)

==== Special delegate ====
Since 2017, Pope Francis has appointed special delegates to fulfill the role that was previously assigned to the patron.

On 2 February 2017 Pope Francis appointed Archbishop Giovanni Angelo Becciu as his special delegate to the order.

After Becciu resigned from the rights and privileges of a cardinal after being implicated in a financial corruption scandal, in October 2020, Pope Francis appointed Archbishop Silvano Tomasi as his special delegate to the order on 1 November 2020.

==== Prelate ====
The Prelate of the order is responsible for the clergy of the order and assists the Grand Master, the Grand Commander and the Coordinator of the Second Class in the care of the spiritual life and in the religious observance of all members of the order. He is appointed by the pope on the advice of the cardinal patron.

On 4 July 2015 Pope Francis named Bishop Jean Laffitte prelate. Laffitte succeeded Archbishop Angelo Acerbi, who had held the office since 2001. Since 21 December 2023 the prelate has been Msgr. Luis Manuel Cuña Ramos, a native of Spain who has spent most of his life in Rome as a consultant and professor of church history at the Pontifical Urban University and the Pontifical Gregorian University.

=== Relationship with other mutually-recognised Orders of Saint John ===
In 1975 the Committee on the Orders of Saint John was formed by the Order of Malta and the four Protestant members of the Alliance of the Orders of Saint John of Jerusalem (the Order of Saint John (Bailiwick of Brandenburg); the Order of Saint John in the Netherlands; the Order of Saint John in Sweden; and the Most Venerable Order of Saint John). The five orders cooperate on historical research activities. They also cooperate on certain humanitarian activities, e.g. the Order of Malta is a major donor of the St John Eye Hospital in Jerusalem, which is primarily operated by the Most Venerable Order of Saint John.

== Nuns of the order ==
There are three enclosed monasteries of nuns of the order, two in Spain that date from the 11/12th centuries and one in Malta. The existence of the nuns is not mentioned in the Constitutional Charter or the Code of the Order.

== International status ==
Foreign relations with the SMOM: Diplomatic relations Other official relations

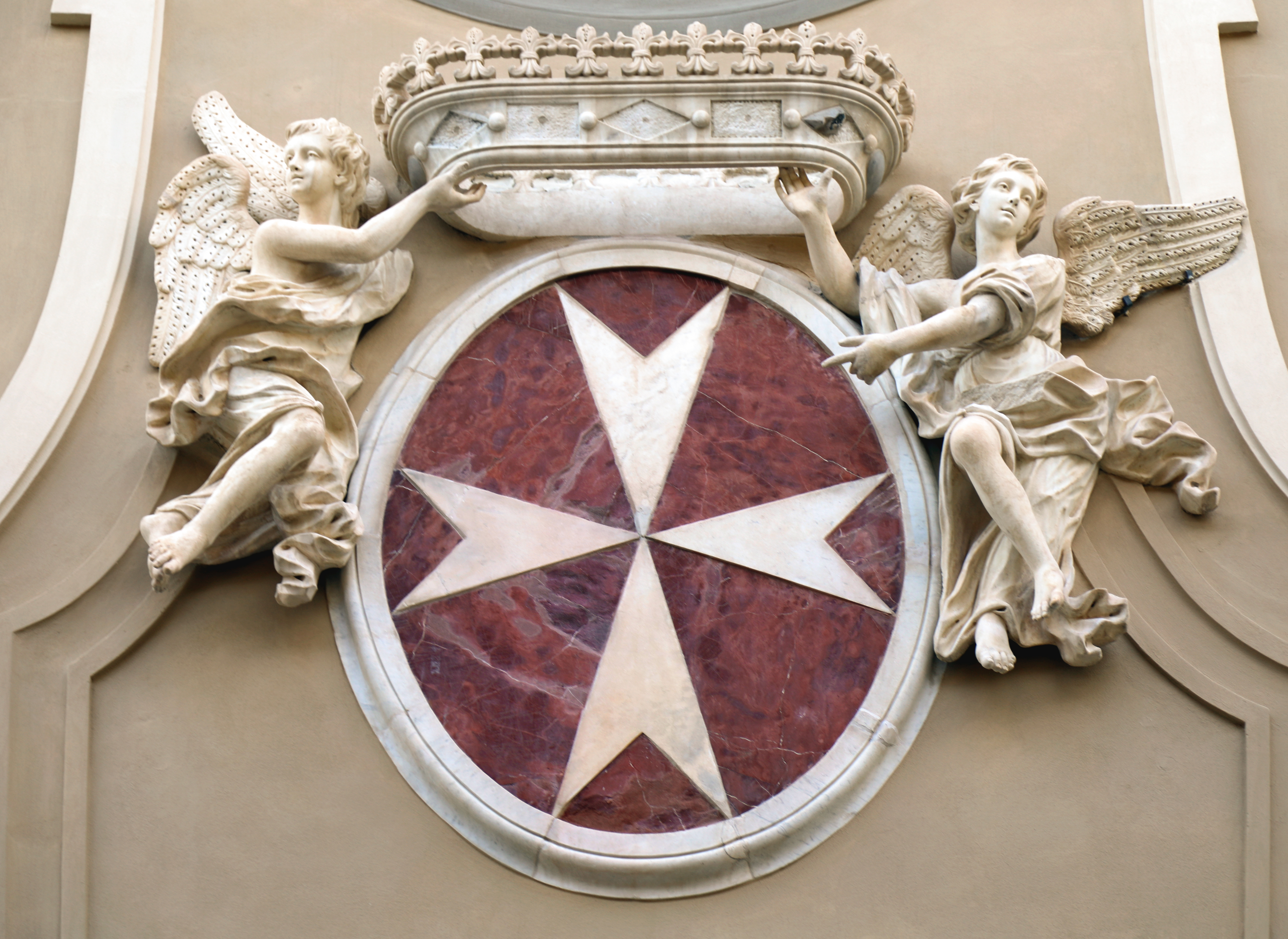
Coat of arms of the Knights of Malta from the façade of the church of San Giovannino dei Cavalieri, Florence, Italy

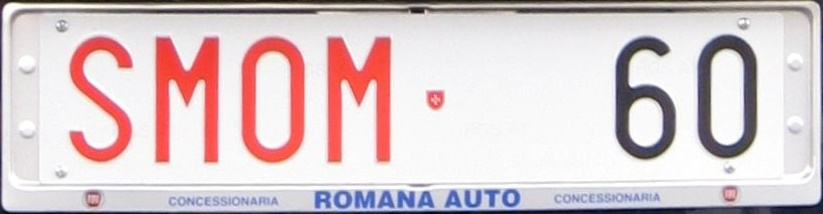
Vehicle registration plate of the order, as seen in Rome, Italy

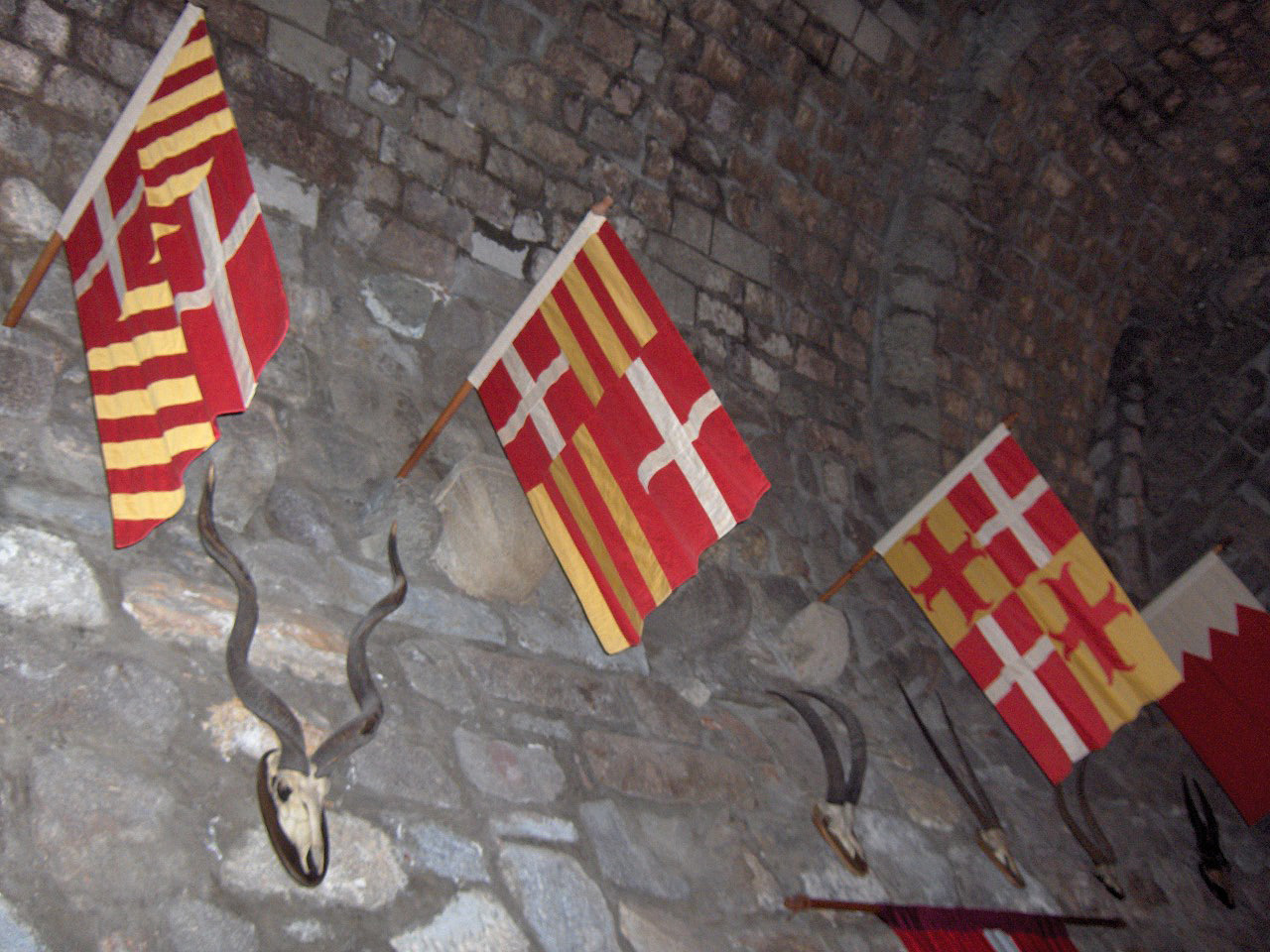
Flags of Knights Hospitaller in Saint Peter's Castle, Bodrum, Turkey. Left to right: Fabrizio Carretto (1513–1514); Amaury d'Amboise (1503–1512); Pierre d'Aubusson (1476–1503); Jacques de Milly (1454–1461).

The order "as a subject of international law, exercises sovereign functions with regard to [its] purposes", namely "promoting the glory of God and the sanctification of its members" and performing works of mercy "towards the sick, the needy, and people without a country without distinction of religion, race, sex, origin and age".

The order has formal diplomatic relations with 114 states (including the Holy See) and has official relations with another five states and with the European Union. The order maintains diplomatic missions around the world and many of the states reciprocate by accrediting ambassadors to the order (usually their ambassador to the Holy See). In 1935, San Marino recognized SMOM as a sovereign state in its own right. During the reign of Fra' Andrew Bertie as Prince and Grand Master (1988–2008), the number of nations extending diplomatic relations to the order more than doubled from 49 to 100.

The order has permanent observer status at the General Assembly of the United Nations and some of the specialized agencies of the United Nations. One such example is the UN Central Emergency Response Fund, to which it contributed US$36,000 from 2006–2022. The order is not classified as a "non-member state" nor as an "intergovernmental organization", but rather as one of the "other entities having received a standing invitation to participate as observers."

The order has relations with the European Union, the International Committee of the Red Cross, and a number of international organizations. While the International Telecommunication Union has granted radio identification prefixes to the United Nations and the Palestinian Authority, the order has never received one. For awards purposes, amateur radio operators consider the order a separate "entity"—but stations transmitting from there use an unofficial callsign, starting with the prefix "1A". The order has neither sought nor been granted a top-level domain for the Internet or an international dialing code for telephone purposes.

The order's international nature is useful in enabling it to pursue its humanitarian activities without being seen as an operative of any particular nation. Its sovereignty is also expressed in the issuance of passports, licence plates, stamps, and coins.

=== Scholarly debate ===
With its unique history and unusual present circumstances, the exact status of the order in international law has been the subject of debate. Some scholars have questioned the order's sovereignty based on the fact that the order has very limited geographical territories and on account of the order's relationship with the Holy See. The connection between the Holy See and the Order of Malta was seen as so close as to call into question the actual sovereignty of the order as a separate entity. This has prompted constitutional changes on the part of the order, which were implemented in 1997.

Some legal experts claim that the order's claim to sovereignty cannot be maintained. Even taking into account the order's ambassadorial diplomatic status among many nations, some scholars reject the order's sovereign status. Wilhelm Wengler rejects the notion that recognition of the order by some states makes it a subject of international law. Ian Brownlie writes that, "Even in the sphere of recognition and bilateral relations, the legal capacities of institutions like the Sovereign Order of Jerusalem and Malta must be limited simply because they lack the territorial and demographic characteristics of states." Helmut Steinberger states that, "With the historical exception of the Holy See, which maintains diplomatic relations with more than 100 States, in contemporary international law only States as distinguished from international organizations or other subjects of international law are accorded sovereignty."

Other legal experts argue in favour of the order's claim to sovereignty. Georg Dahm affirms that the order is a "subject of international law without territory". Berthold Waldstein-Wartenberg writes that the sovereignty of the order and its personality in international law is "generally recognized by international law doctrine". Gerhard von Glahn affirms that "the Order can be classified as a nonstate subject of international law, although of a somewhat peculiar nature." According to Rebecca Wallace, a sovereign entity does not have to be a country, and the order is an example of this.

=== Relations with the Holy See ===
On 24 January 1953, the Tribunal of Cardinals appointed by Pope Pius XII stated that, "The quality of the sovereign Order of the institution is functional, that is, aimed at ensuring the achievement of the purposes of the Order itself and its development in the world." The Tribunal of Cardinals further stated that,

The status of sovereign Order...consists in the enjoyment of certain prerogatives inherent to the Order itself as a Subject of international law. These prerogatives, which are proper to sovereignty—in accordance with the principles of international law—and which, following the example of the Holy See, have also been recognized by some States, do not however constitute in the Order that complex of powers and prerogatives, which it belongs to sovereign bodies in the full sense of the word.

On 24 June 1961, Pope John XXIII approved the Constitutional Charter of the Order, which stated that "the Order is a legal entity formally approved by the Holy See. It has the quality of a subject of international law" (Article 1) and that

the intimate connection existing between the two qualities of a religious order and a sovereign order do not oppose the autonomy of the order in the exercise of its sovereignty and prerogatives inherent to it as a subject of international law in relation to States. (Article 3)

=== Relations with Italy ===
The order has signed treaties with Italy dated 20 February 1884, 23 December 1915, 4 January 1938, and 1956.

The Supreme Court of Cassation decreed on 6 June 1974 that,

the Sovereign Military Hospitaller Order of Malta constitutes a sovereign international subject, in all terms equal, even if without territory, to a foreign state with which Italy has normal diplomatic relations, so there is no doubt, as already this Supreme Court has warned, that it has the legal treatment of foreign states.

The two most important properties of the order in Rome—the Palazzo Malta in Via dei Condotti 68, where the Grand Master resides and Government Bodies meet, and the Villa del Priorato di Malta on the Aventine Hill, which hosts the Grand Priory of Rome—as well as the Embassy of the Order to Holy See and the Embassy of the Order to Italy are all recognised as extraterritorial by Italy. As Italy recognizes, in addition to extraterritoriality, the exercise by SMOM of all the prerogatives of sovereignty in its headquarters, Italian sovereignty and SMOM sovereignty uniquely coexist without overlapping.

By a decree of King Victor Emmanuel III of Italy of 28 November 1929, "The Grand Master of the Sovereign Military Order of Malta enjoys in Italy the honors due to the Cardinals, and takes place after them." Further, "The representation of the Grand Magistry of the Sovereign Military Order of Malta . . . immediately follows the representations of the Foreign Diplomatic Corps." Finally, the decree affirms that the Bailiffs Knights Grand Cross of Justice in Italy shall be styled "Excellency" (Italian: Eccellenza).

The order is one of the largest landowners in Italy; its properties are exempted from certain Italian fiscal jurisdiction.

Diplomatic vehicles of the order in Italy receive diplomatic license plates with the code "XA". Other vehicles of the order receive Italian license plates with the prefix SMOM.

=== Relations with the Republic of Malta ===
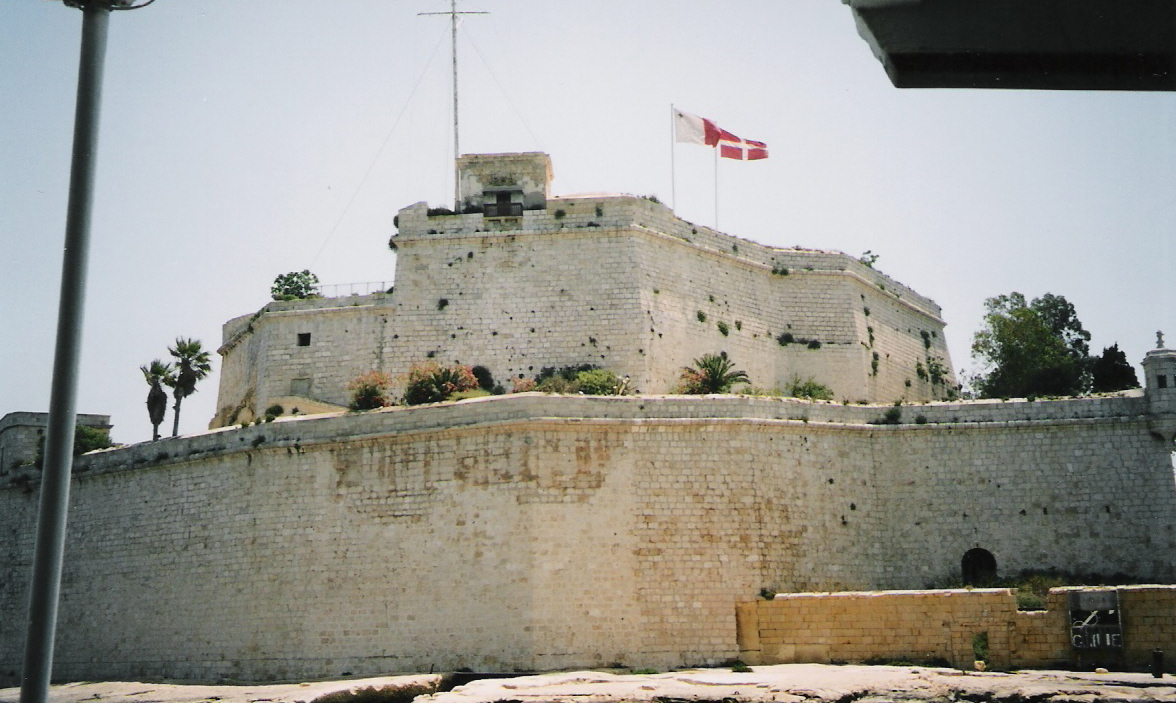
Flags of Malta and the SMOM on Fort St. Angelo

Two bilateral treaties have been concluded between the order and the Republic of Malta. The first treaty, dated 21 June 1991, is now no longer in force. The second treaty was signed on 5 December 1998 and ratified on 1 November 2001.

This agreement grants the order the use with limited extraterritoriality of the upper portion of Fort St. Angelo in the city of Birgu. Its stated purpose is "to give the Order the opportunity to be better enabled to carry out its humanitarian activities as Knights Hospitallers from Saint Angelo, as well as to better define the legal status of Saint Angelo subject to the sovereignty of Malta over it".

The agreement has a duration of 99 years, but the document allows the Government of Malta to terminate it at any time after 50 years. Under the terms of the agreement, the flag of Malta is to be flown together with the flag of the order in a prominent position over Fort St. Angelo. No asylum may be granted by the order and generally the Maltese courts have full jurisdiction and Maltese law shall apply. The second bilateral treaty mentions a number of immunities and privileges, none of which appeared in the earlier treaty.

=== Currency and postage stamps ===
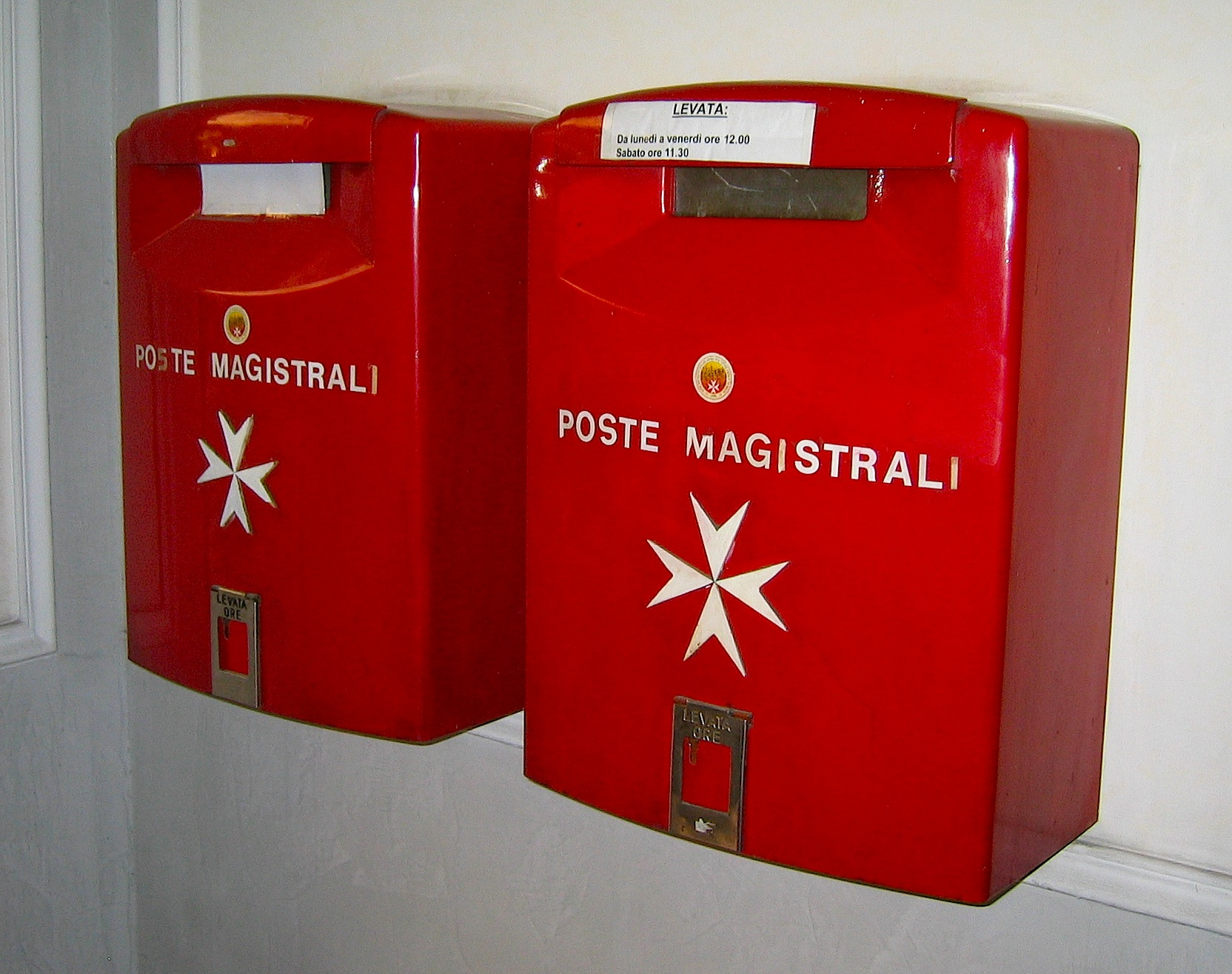
Post boxes of the SMOM at their headquarters in Rome

The Order maintains a functioning postal service, the Poste Magistrali, which issues its own stamps and provides ordinary mail service for the delivery of letters and postcards sent from its extraterritorial properties in Rome. There is one public post office, open on weekdays inside the Magistral Palace, from which regular mail can be sent to Italy or some 57 other countries which recognize the order's postage stamps for franking purposes. These include nations like Canada and Mongolia that lack full diplomatic relations with the order. In 2005, Poste italiane, the Italian postal service, agreed with the order to deliver internationally most classes of mail other than registered, insured, and special-delivery mail.

The Order also issues coins denominated in the scudo, the historic currency of the order. These are appreciated more as collector's items than for use as currency.

== Military Corps ==
Logotype of the Military Corps of the Sovereign Military Order of Malta

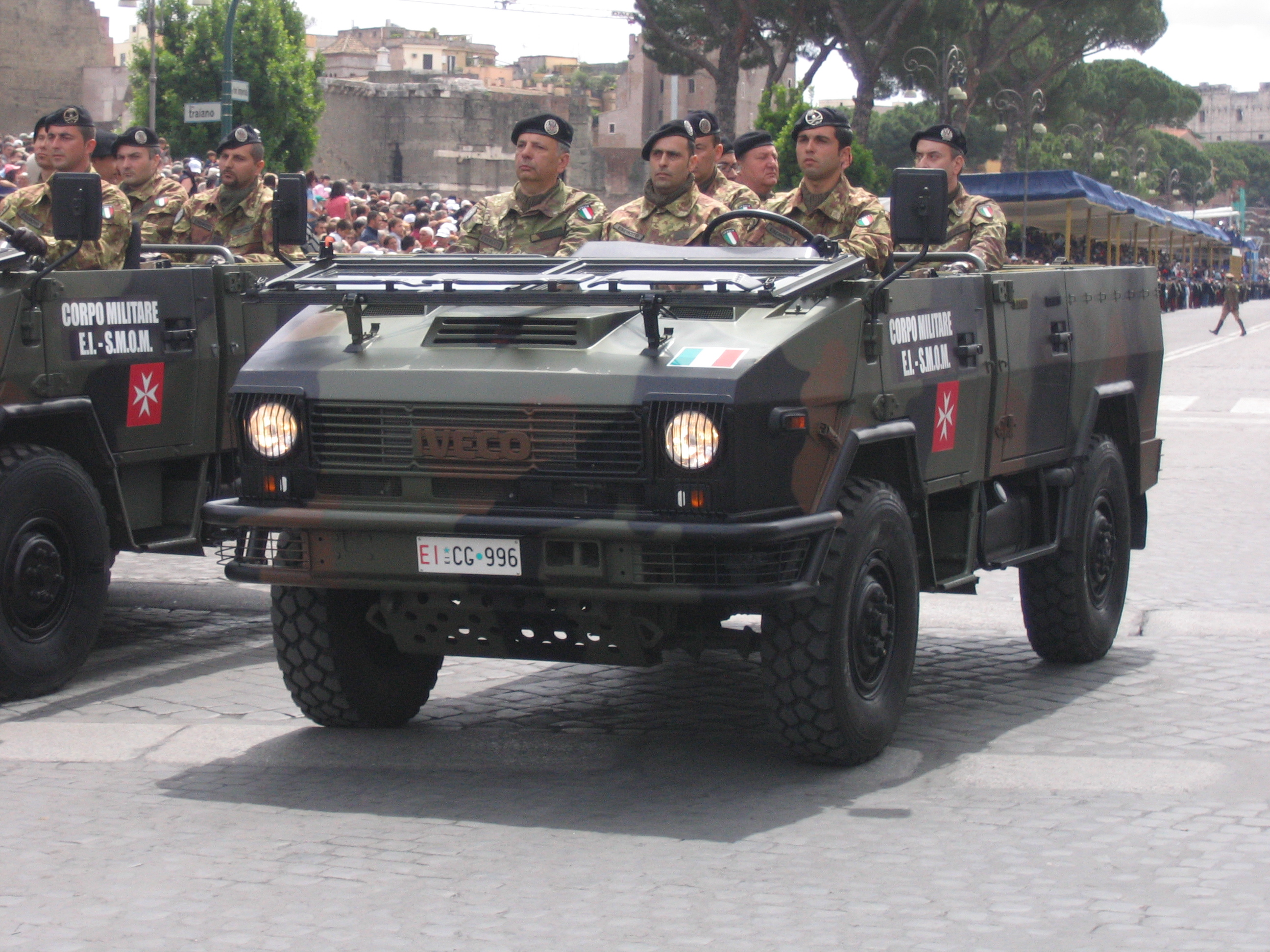
Military Corps of the Sovereign Military Order of Malta, ACISMOM, in parade during Festa della Repubblica in Rome (2007)

The order states that it was the hospitaller role that enabled the order to survive the end of the crusading era; nonetheless, it retains its military title and traditions.

On 26 March 1876, the Association of the Italian Knights of the Sovereign Military Order of Malta (Associazione dei cavalieri italiani del sovrano militare ordine di Malta, ACISMOM) reformed the order's military to a modern military unit of the era. This unit provided medical support to the Italian Army and on 9 April 1909 the military corps officially became a special auxiliary volunteer corps of the Italian Army under the name Corpo Militare dell'Esercito dell'ACISMOM (Army Military Corps of the ACISMOM), wearing Italian uniforms. Since then the Military Corps have operated with the Italian Army both in wartime and peacetime in medical or paramedical military functions, and in ceremonial functions for the order, such as standing guard around the coffins of high officers of the order before and during funeral rites.

I believe that it is a unique case in the world that a unit of the army of one country is supervised by a body of another sovereign country. Just think that whenever our staff (medical officers mainly) is engaged in a military mission abroad, there is the flag of the Order flying below the Italian flag.

— Fausto Solaro del Borgo, President of the Italian Association of the Sovereign Military Order of Malta, stated in a speech given in London in November 2007.

=== Air force ===
Roundel of the air force of the Sovereign Military Order of Malta

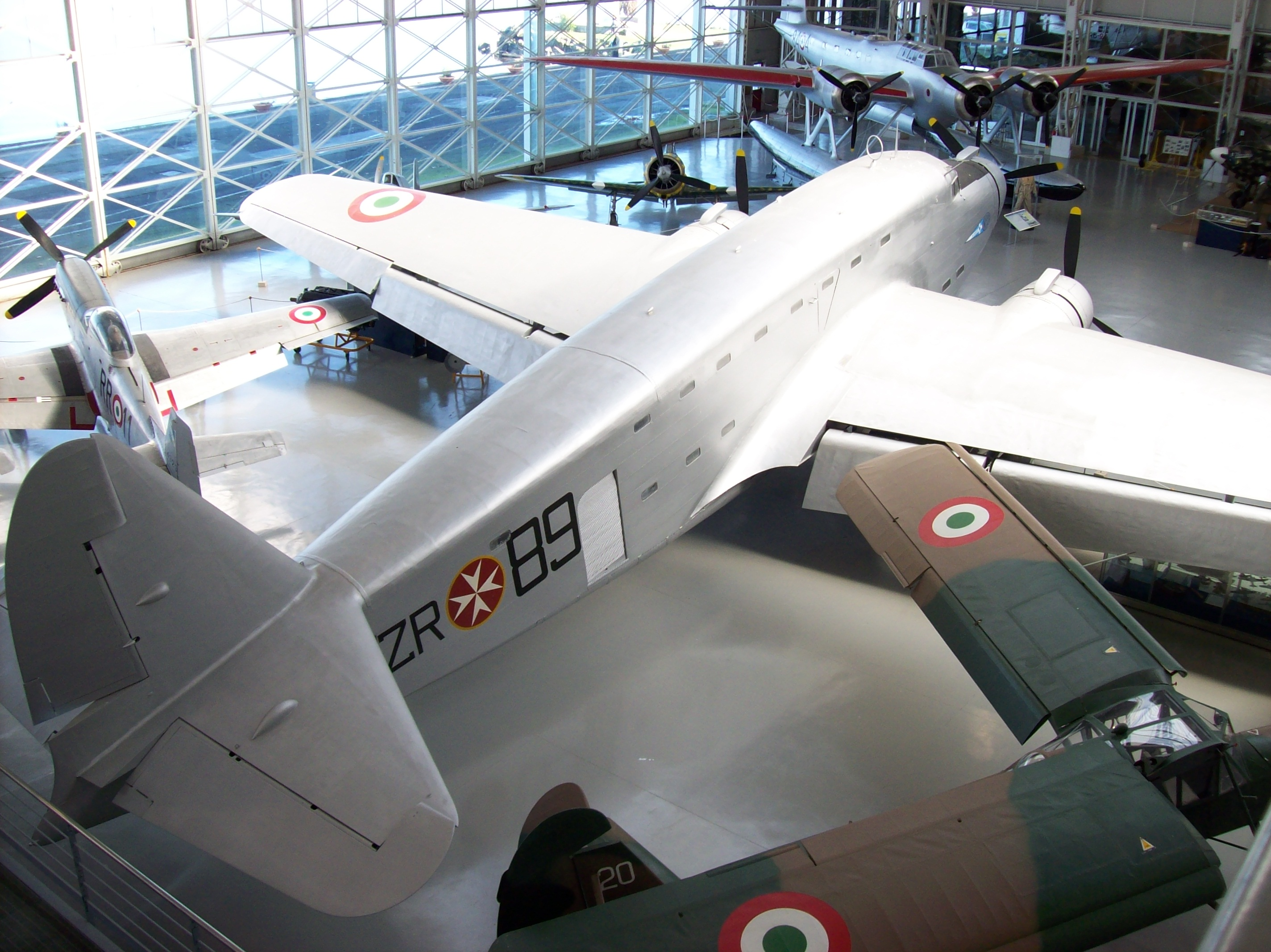
SMOM Savoia-Marchetti SM.82 at the Italian Air Force Museum

In 1947, after the post-World War II peace treaty forbade Italy to own or operate bomber aircraft and only operate a limited number of transport aircraft, the Italian Air Force opted to transfer some of its Savoia-Marchetti SM.82 aircraft to the Sovereign Military Order of Malta, pending the definition of their exact status (the SM.82s were properly long range transport aircraft that could be adapted for bombing missions). These aircraft were operated by Italian Air Force personnel temporarily flying for the order, carried the order's roundels on the fuselage and Italian ones on the wings, and were used mainly for standard Italian Air Force training and transport missions but also for some humanitarian tasks proper of the Order of Malta (like the transport of sick pilgrims to the Lourdes sanctuary). In the early 1950s, when the strictures of the peace treaty had been much relaxed by the Allied authorities, the aircraft returned under full control of the Italian Air Force. One of the aircraft transferred to the Order of Malta, still with the order's fuselage roundels, is preserved in the Italian Air Force Museum.

=== Logistics ===
The Military Corps has become known in mainland Europe for its operation of hospital trains, a service carried out intensively during both World Wars. The Military Corps still operates a modern 28-car hospital train with 192 hospital beds, serviced by a medical staff of 38 medics and paramedics provided by the order and a technical staff provided by the Italian Army's Ferrovieri Engineer Regiment.

== Current activity ==
The Sovereign Military Order of Malta has major cooperation with the Alliance of the Orders of Saint John of Jerusalem. They monitor breaches having set up an Unrecognised Orders Monitoring Group. In Germany, in daughter societies of both organisations there was alleged, that there was not much concern about racism by staff in the early 2020s. Malteser Auslandsdienst (Malteser Foreign Service) is an organisation from Germany active in several European countries as well as South Africa and Chile. Malteser Aid Service was founded by the order and the German Caritas Association in Germany in 1953. Malteser International has more than 140 projects in 35 countries in Africa, Asia and the Americas. Malteser International is a division of Malteser Hilfsdienst e.V. and based in Cologne, Germany. Malteser International Americas is based in New York, US. It provides emergency aid. It is active in Venezuela, Colombia, Haiti, but also Ukraine, Iraq, Lebanon, Syria, Kenya, South Sudan, the Democratic Republic of Congo and Myanmar, inter alia. In 2023, more than half its income was from the Government of Germany. The current membership of Malteser International consists of 27 National Associations and Priories of the Order of Malta. Ministry of Agriculture and Forestry (South Sudan), Ministry of Animal Resources and Fisheries (South Sudan), Ministry of Education and Instruction (South Sudan), Ministry of Health (Nigeria), Ministry of Health (Uganda), Ministry of Water Resources and Irrigation (South Sudan) and Ministry of Women Affairs (Nigeria) are among the partners of Malteser International. The German Federal Foreign Office has started a campaign on forgotten crises, with other organisation including Save the Children, CARE and SOS Children's Villages.

== Orders, decorations, and medals ==
- Order pro Merito Melitensi

== See also ==
- Knights Hospitaller
- List of Knights Hospitaller sites
- Order of Malta Ambulance Corps (Ireland)
- Sovereign State of the Bektashi Order
