= Postage stamps and postal history of the Sovereign Military Order of Malta =

A stamp from the first series of SMOM stamps issued in 1966

This is an article about the postage stamps and postal history of the Sovereign Military Order of Malta. The Order maintains the Poste Magistrali, a postal service established in 1966 which issues stamps and delivers mail and postcards to select countries with which the Order has bilateral postal agreements.

The Sovereign Military Hospitaller Order of Saint John of Jerusalem, of Rhodes, and of Malta, otherwise known as the Sovereign Military Order of Malta or SMOM is a Roman Catholic order based in Rome, Italy. The order takes its origins from the Knights Hospitaller, an organization founded in Jerusalem in 1050. Following the loss of Christian-held territories of the Holy Land to Muslims, the Order operated from Rhodes (1310–1523), and later from Malta (1530–1798), over which it was sovereign.

== Postal service in Hospitaller Malta ==
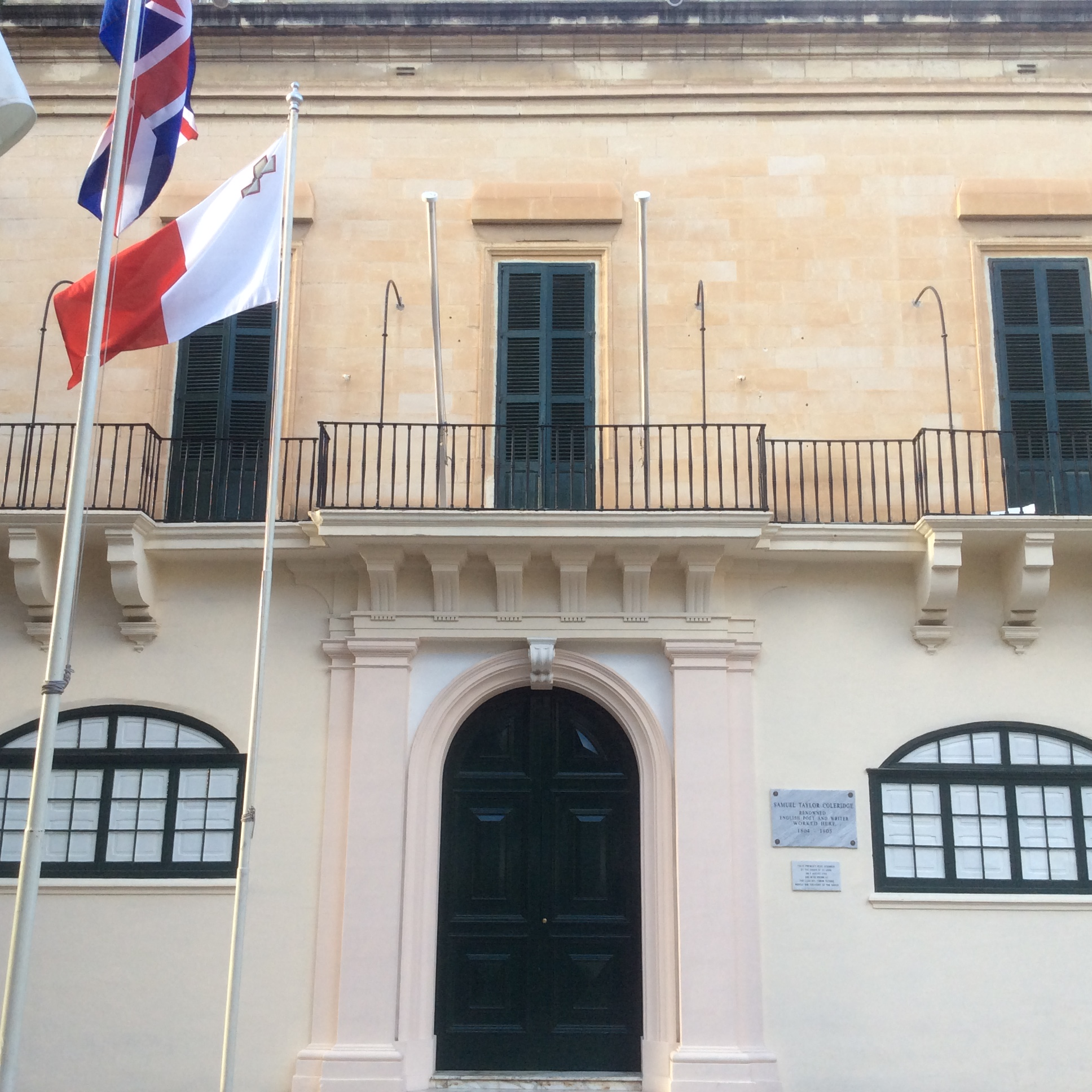
The Casa del Commun Tesoro, which housed the Order's post office in Malta from 1708 to 1798

The Knights Hospitaller established an early form of postal service in Malta in the early 1530s, and the earliest known letter from the islands was sent from Grand Master Philippe Villiers de L'Isle-Adam to François II de Dinteville, the Bishop of Auxerre and the French ambassador in Rome, on 14 June 1532. In 1708, a formal postal service known as the Commissary of Posts was established by Grand Master Ramon Perellós, and it was based at the Casa del Commun Tesoro in Valletta. The first postal markings on Maltese mail appeared later on in the 18th century, and the postal service continued to function until the expulsion of the Hospitallers by Napoleon in 1798. Malta's postal service was subsequently reformed during French and later British rule, and part of the Casa del Commun Tesoro remained a post office until 1849.

== Stamps ==
In 1950, the SMOM issued a set of cinderella letter seals (Italian: chiudilettere) depicting locations and people associated with the Order, and they were sold for 1 Italian lira.

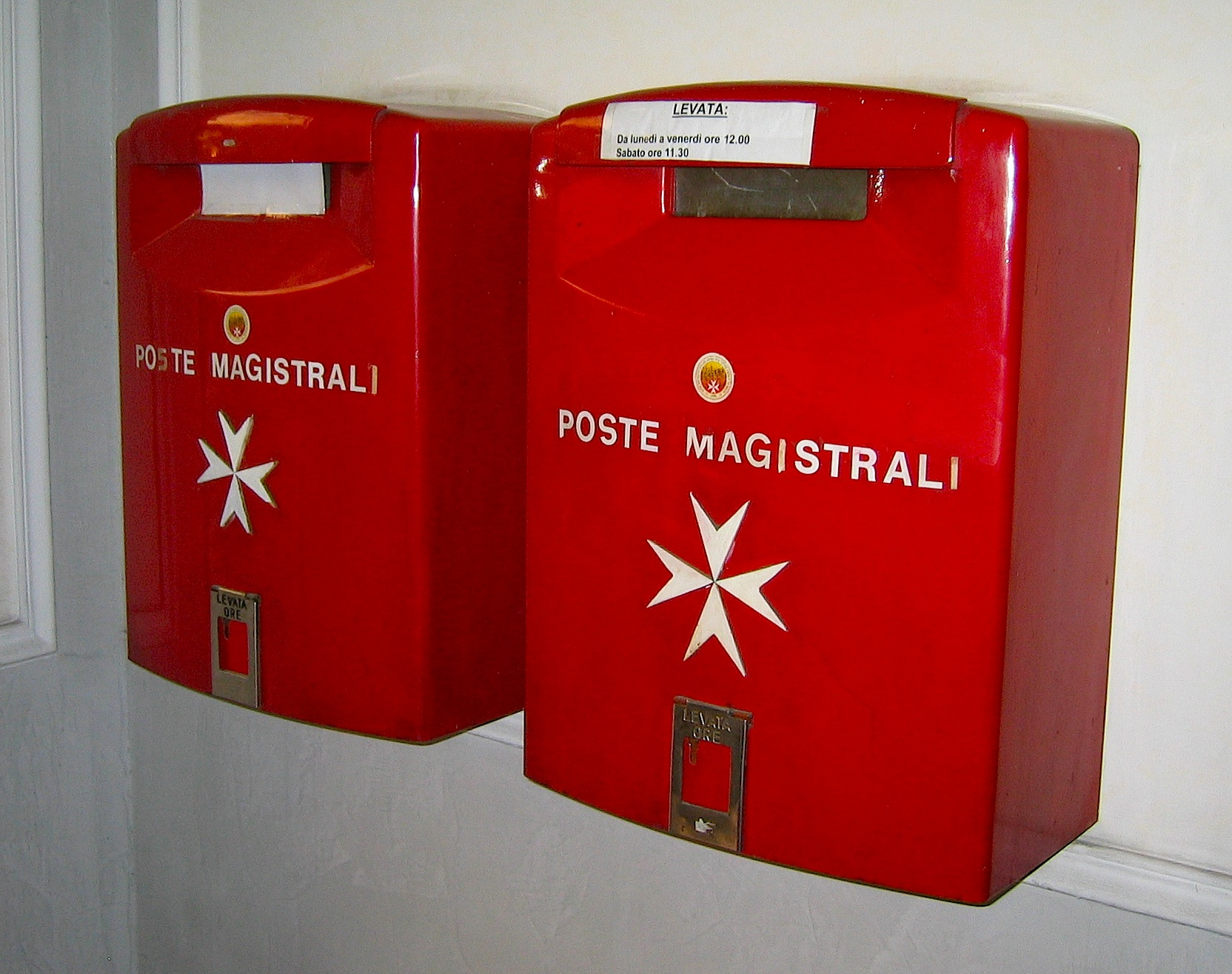
Post boxes of the SMOM at their headquarters in Rome

The Order's modern postal administration, known as the Poste Magistrali, was instituted on 20 May 1966 under a Decree of the Grand Master Angelo de Mojana di Cologna. Post offices were established at Palazzo Malta and Villa del Priorato di Malta, the Order's two extra-territorial seats in Rome. Poste Magistrali issued its first set of stamps on 15 November 1966, and these and subsequent issues were denominated in Scudi, Grani and Tarì, which roughly equated to the currency of Malta before it joined the eurozone; 1 scudo = 12 tari = 240 grani = 12 Maltese cents. Since 1 January 2005 the stamps have been denominated in euros.

The stamps are inscribed Poste Magistrali and bear one or more small Maltese Crosses. Early issues were printed by De La Rue, but today a variety of Maltese and Italian printers are used. As well as postage stamps, the Order has produced aerogrammes, maximum cards, first day covers, miniature sheets, postage due stamps and postcards with imprinted stamps.

Each year, one stamp issue is devoted to St. John the Baptist, who is the Order's Patron Saint, and one to the celebration of Christmas.

== Current Status ==
Countries which have bilateral postal agreements with the Poste Magistrali as of 2026.

Today, the SMOM maintains one public post office in the Palazzo Malta, open on weekdays for regular commercial postal service. Stamps can be purchased and envelopes or postcards can be sent, though the Poste Magistrali does not handle the shipment of larger packages. The SMOM is not a member of the Universal Postal Union but maintains more than 50 bilateral postal agreements with nations that will receive mail sent with Poste Magistrali stamps from the SMOM buildings in Rome.

Because they do not have postal validity throughout the world, the Poste Magistrali stamps are usually classed as cinderella stamps in nations which do not have a bilateral postal agreement with the SMOM. Most postal agreements are with countries in which the order does charitable work.
