= Knight in Obedience =

Class of the Sovereign Military Order of Malta

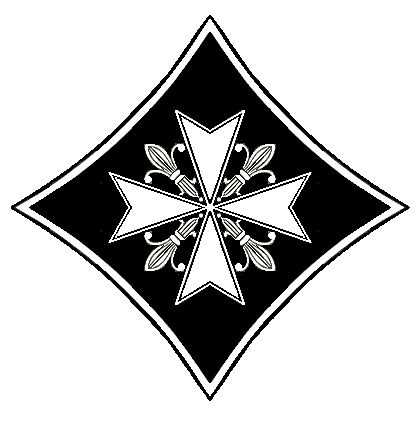
Borstkruis van een Ridder van Obediëntie

The Knights and Dames in Obedience form the second of the three classes of the Sovereign Military Order of Malta. Unlike the members of the first class (the Knights of Justice) who make vows of poverty, chastity, and obedience, the members of the second class make a promise of obedience by which they "oblige themselves to strive for the perfection of Christian life in conformity with the obligation of their state, in the spirit of the Order" (Constitutional Charter, Article 9, Par. 2). The class was instituted between the two World Wars in order to strengthen the Order's religious and spiritual character. The Knights in Obedience wear a red-bordered black scapular over their choir dress.

The Knights and Dames in Obedience are divided into three categories according to their hereditary noble status:

- Knights and Dames of Honour and Devotion in Obedience
- Knights and Dames of Grace and Devotion in Obedience
- Knights and Dames of Magistral Grace in Obedience
