= Villa del Priorato di Malta =

Building in Rome, Italy

Coordinates: 41°53′01″N 12°28′39″E

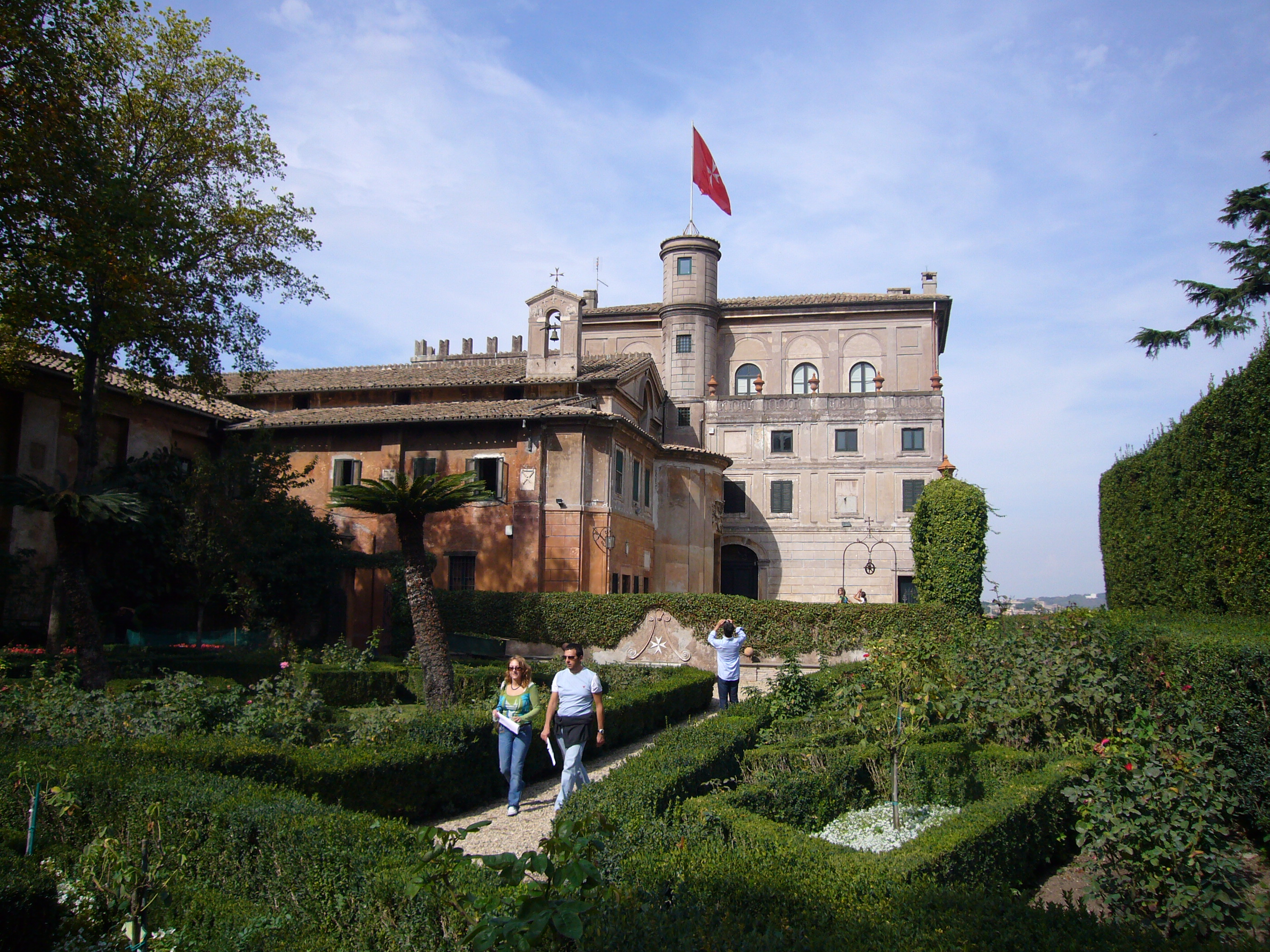
The villa and garden

Villa del Priorato di Malta or Magistral Villa, located on the Aventine Hill in Rome, is one of the two institutional seats of the government of the Sovereign Military Order of Malta. Along with Magistral Palace, the estate is granted extraterritorial status by Italy. It also hosts the Grand Priory of Rome and the embassy of the Sovereign Order of Malta to Italy.

== History ==
The site, on a rise directly overlooking the Tiber and access to the Roman Pons Sublicius, was already a fortified Benedictine monastery in the tenth century. The monastery passed to the Templars and after the destruction of their order, to the Knights Hospitallers, predecessors of the present Order of Malta. Radical rebuilding was undertaken in the 15th through 17th centuries. The villa was granted extraterritoriality in 1869. On the piano nobile is an assemblage of portraits of the Grand Masters of the Order.

== Site ==
The site is reached by Via Santa Sabina, which ends in the small, picturesque Piazza dei Cavalieri di Malta enclosed on two sides by the cypresses of the garden of the Benedictines backing the fantasy screen of obelisks and stele constructed in 1765 to designs by Giovanni Battista Piranesi, one of the very few executed designs by this etcher of Roman views who prided himself on being an architect. Ahead rises the Neo-Romanesque campanile of the Church of San Anselmo (1893-1900) attached to the international Benedictine seminary (Seminario Internazionale Benedettino).

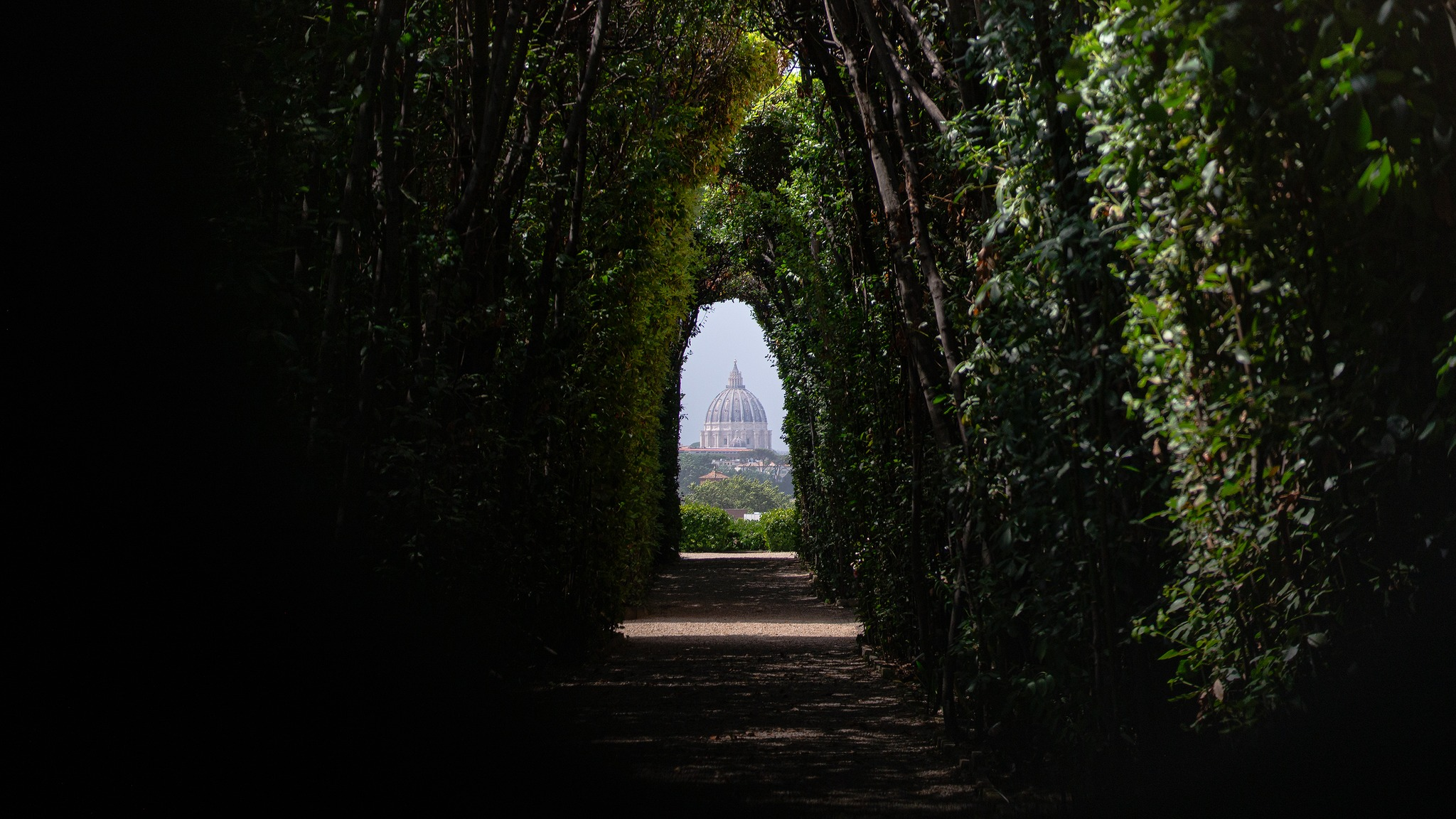
The Aventine Keyhole

=== Keyhole ===
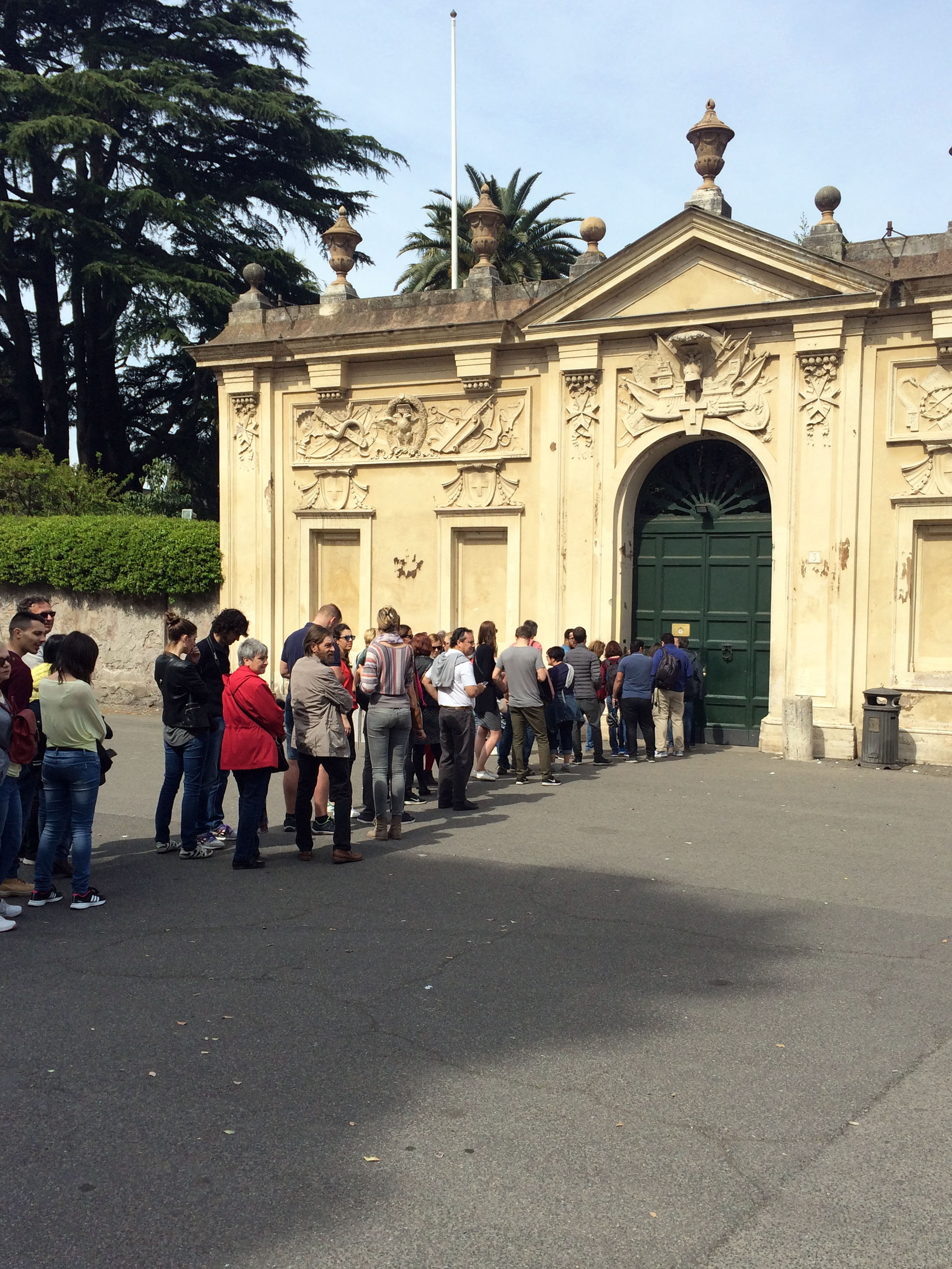
People waiting to get a view of Saint Peter's Basilica through the keyhole of the door leading to the Villa Malta.

At the northern side of the square the monumental entrance screen is located, also designed by Piranesi under commission from Cardinal Carlo Rezzonico, nephew of Pope Clement XIII. The Villa is arguably best known for a small keyhole (Il Buco Della Serratura) in the arch-headed central portone, through which the copper-green dome of Saint Peter's Basilica, can be viewed at the end of a garden allée framed in clipped cypresses.

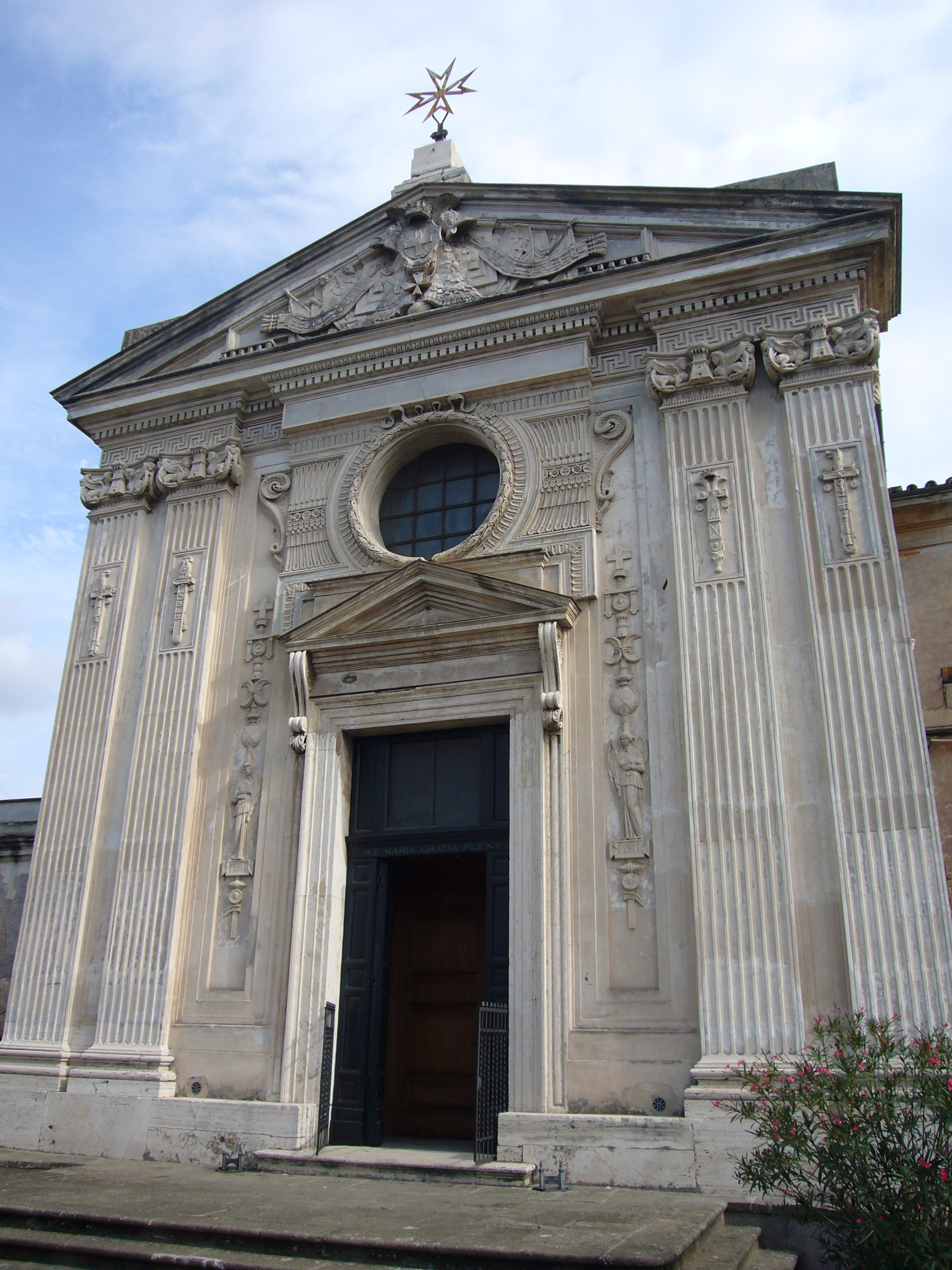
Santa Maria del Priorato, by Giovanni Battista Piranesi

The parterre garden links the villa with the Order's Church of Santa Maria del Priorato, an ancient church completely redesigned by Piranesi in 1765, affording perhaps the earliest example in Rome of Neoclassical architecture. Its facade is capped with a low pediment; paired pilasters on either side of the door have fanciful capitals each formed of a tower flanked by seated sphinxes; other elements of the classical vocabulary are also combined in fanciful and personal ways.
