= Palazzo Malta =

- Palazzo Magistrale
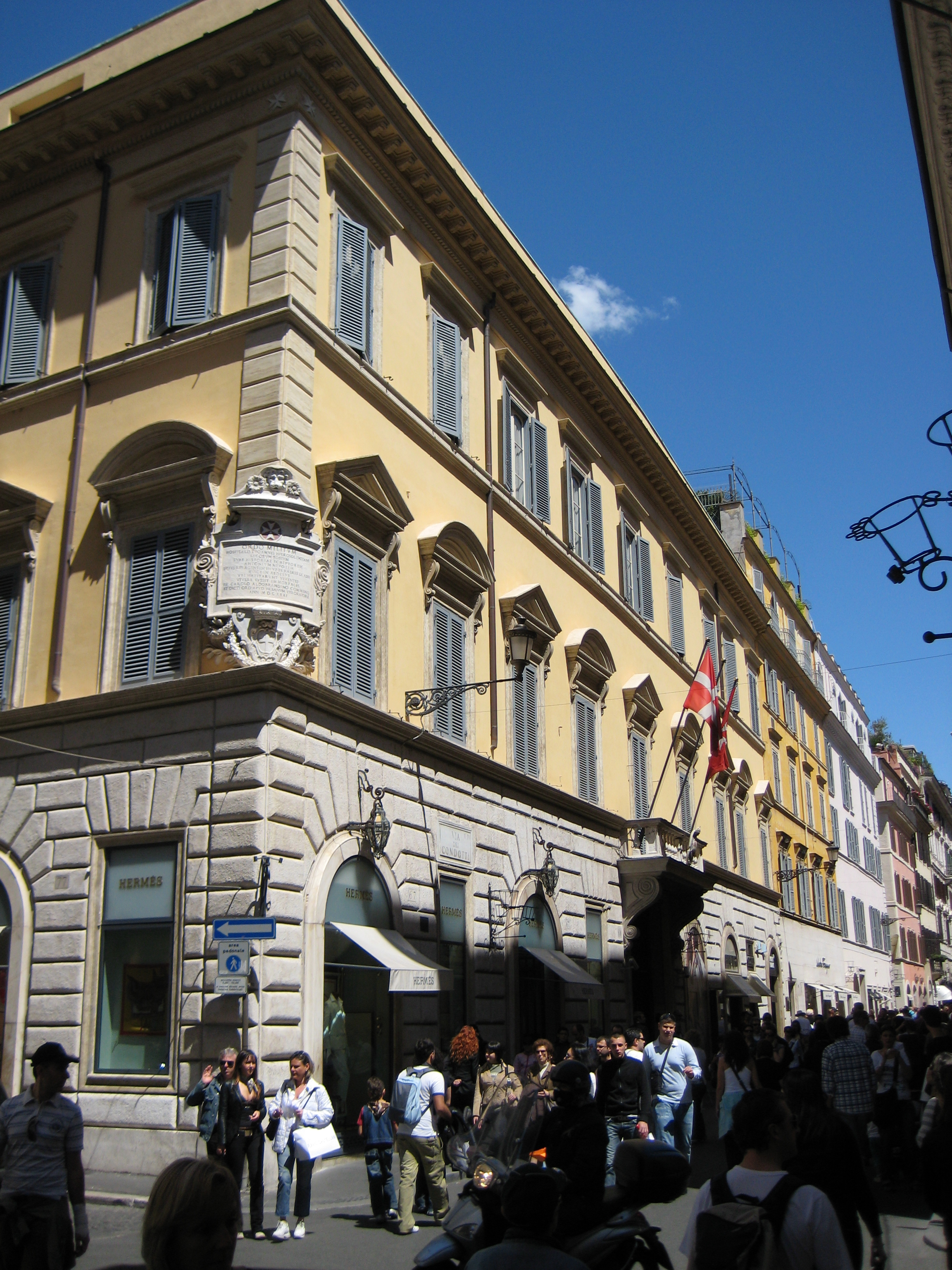
- View of Palazzo Malta
- Click on the map for a fullscreen view
- Alternative names: Magistral Palace; Palazzo di Malta; Palazzo dell'Ordine di Malta

General information
- Status: Completed
- Type: Palace
- Location: Rome, Italy, Via dei Condotti, 68
- Coordinates: 41°54′19″N 12°28′50″E
- Completed: 17th century
- Renovated: 18th century 1889–1894
- Owner: Sovereign Military Order of Malta

Palazzo Malta, officially named as the Magistral Palace (Italian: Palazzo Magistrale), and also known as Palazzo di Malta or Palazzo dell'Ordine di Malta, is the more important of the two headquarters of the Sovereign Military Order of Malta (the other being Villa Malta on Aventine Hill), a Roman Catholic lay religious order and a sovereign subject of international law. It is located in Via dei Condotti, 68 in Rome, Italy, a few minutes' walk from the Spanish Steps, and has been granted extraterritoriality by the Italian Government. The Palace has been a property of the Order of Malta since 1630.

== Context ==
On 12 June 1798, the French forces under Napoleon Bonaparte were seen over the horizon of the island of Malta, Malta had been the base of the Order of St. John of Jerusalem, also called the Order of Malta. The Order had been given the island by Charles V, Holy Roman Emperor in 1530. Napoleon left the island with a sizeable garrison and a handpicked administration. Following a Maltese uprising, the British Lord Nelson was asked and took over Malta on 5 September 1800. Malta was made a British colony on 30 March 1814 by the Treaty of Paris.

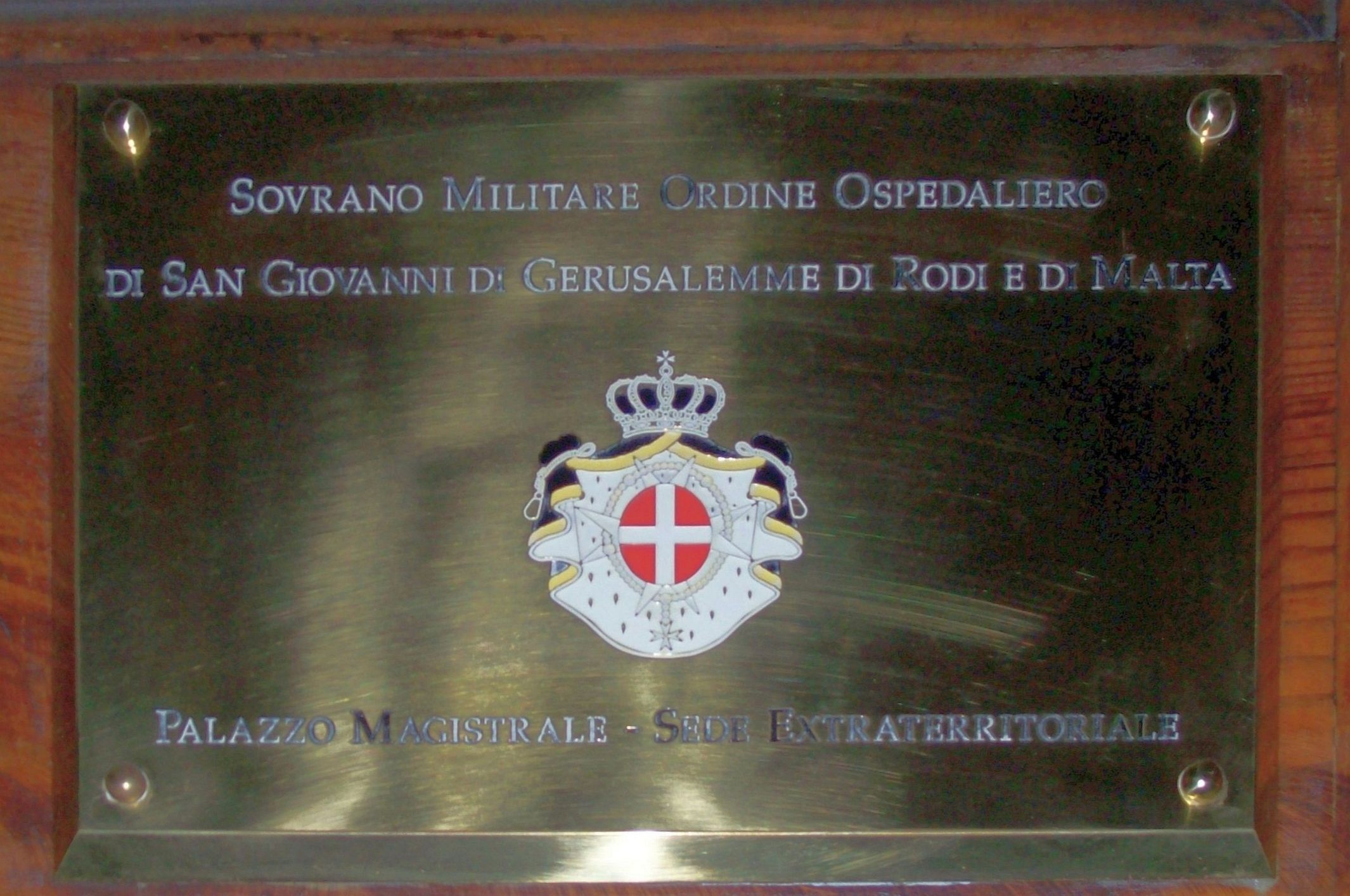
Plaque at the entrance

Thus, the Order of Malta was left without any territory, and it was effectively disbanded. It was restored, however, in 1834, under the new name "Sovereign Military Hospitaller Order of St. John of Jerusalem of Rhodes and of Malta", or simply the "Sovereign Military Order of Malta" (SMOM). New headquarters were set up at Palazzo Malta. In 1869, the Palazzo Malta, and the other headquarters of the Order, Villa Malta, were granted extraterritoriality. Today they are recognised by 110 countries as the independent headquarters of a sovereign entity, with mutual diplomatic relations established.

== History ==
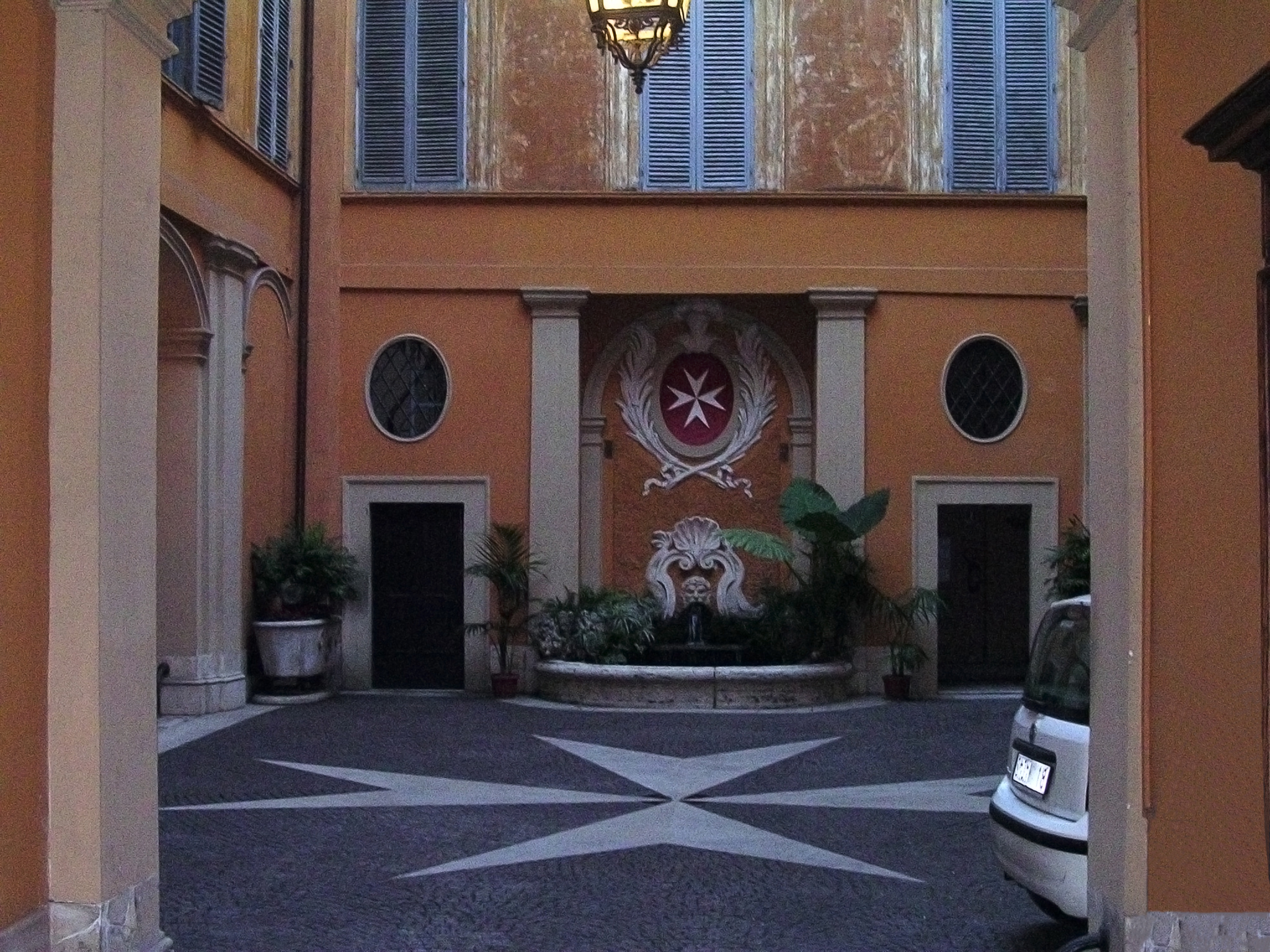
Courtyard of Palazzo di Malta

The building now called Palazzo Malta was purchased in the 16th century by the Maltese-born Italian archeologist Antonio Bosio, whose uncle was the representative of the Order of St. John to the Holy See. When Bosio died in 1629, he left the building to the Order, and it subsequently became the home of the Order's ambassador to the Holy See. When Carlo Aldobrandini became ambassador, he enlarged the building to its present size. The majority of governmental and administrative duties are also carried out in the building.

In the 1720s, Grand Master António Manoel de Vilhena entrusted Carlo Gimach with the restoration and additional decoration of the palace. This information is retrieved with the letters exchanged by the Grandmaster and the ambassador for the Order in Rome, Giambattista Spinola. Renovations included the addition of a grand fountain in the courtyard. The building remained an embassy until the entire Order moved its headquarters there in 1834.

The building was extensively renovated between 1889 and 1894, but most of the original characteristics were retained.

On 26 January 1938, Infante Juan Carlos (future King Juan Carlos I), was baptized in this palace in a ceremony officiated by Cardinal Pacelli, future Pope Pius XII.

Matthew Festing, who served as the Order's Prince and Grand Master, lived in the building from 2008 until his resignation in 2017, following a dispute with the Vatican.

== Architecture ==
The building is made of ashlar blocks, and it is crowned with a corbelled cornice.

== Post Office ==
The building contains a functioning post office operated by the Poste Magistrali, the official postal service of the Order of Malta distinct from the Italian postal service, Poste Italiane. Open on weekdays for regular commercial mail services, customers can buy unique Order of Malta stamps and send letters and postcards bearing the specific postmark of the Order. Because the Poste Magistrali is not a member of the Universal Postal Union, mail can only be sent to the more than 50 countries which have signed bilateral postal agreements with the Order.

Preceded by Palazzo Madama, Rome	Landmarks of Rome; Palazzo Malta	Succeeded by Palace of Justice, Rome
