= Order of Merit of the Italian Republic =

Senior order of merit

Order of Merit of the Italian Republic Ordine al merito della Repubblica Italiana
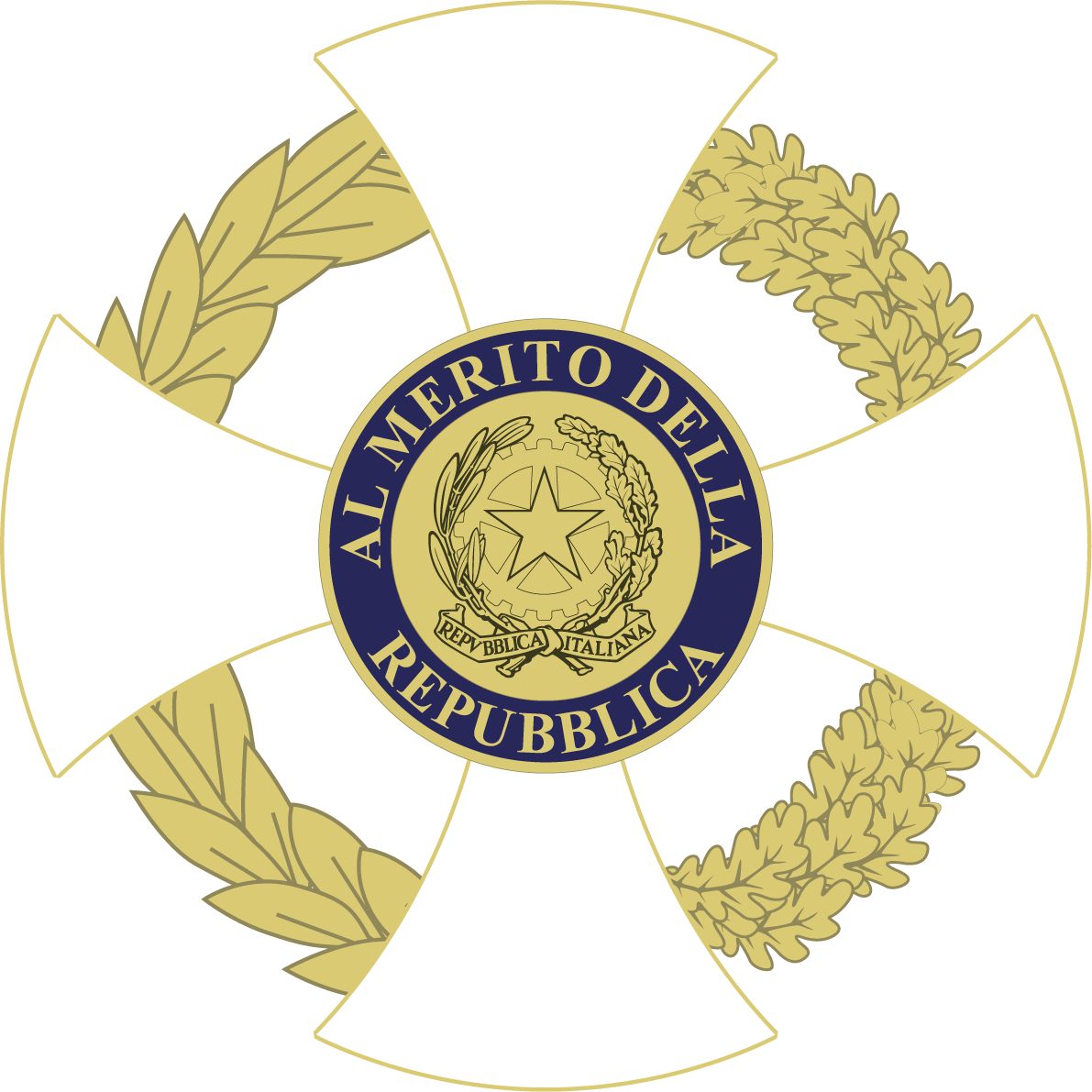
- Emblem of the order

Awarded by the Italian Republic
- Type: Order of merit
- Established: 3 March 1951; 75 years ago
- Country: Italy
- Eligibility: Civilian and military divisions
- Criteria: Meritorious service or achievement
- Status: Currently constituted
- Founder: Luigi Einaudi
- Grand Master: President of the Republic
- Grades: Knight Grand Cross with Collar; Knight Grand Cross; Grand Officer; Commander; Officer; Knight
- Website: www.quirinale.it/page/omri

Precedence
- Next (higher): None
- Next (lower): Military Order of Italy
- Ribbon of the order

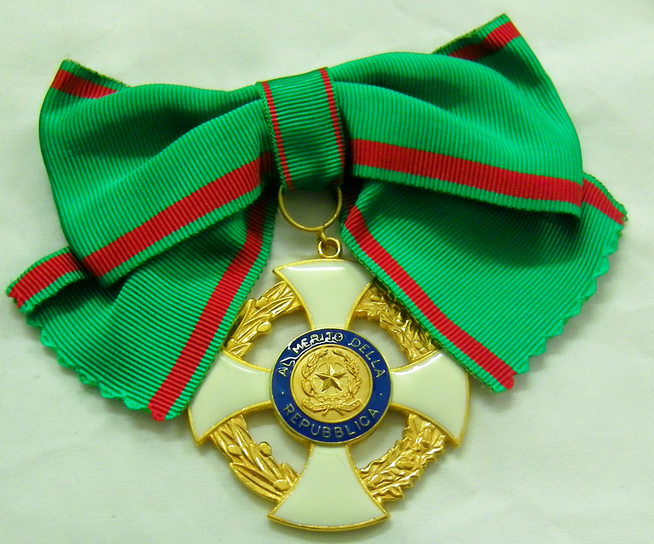
Commander's badge with a ribbon bow

The Order of Merit of the Italian Republic (Italian: Ordine al merito della Repubblica Italiana) is the most senior Italian order of merit. It was established in 1951 by the second president of the Italian Republic, Luigi Einaudi.

The highest-ranking honour of the Republic, it is awarded for "merit acquired by the nation" in the fields of science, literature, arts, economy, public service, and social, philanthropic and humanitarian activities and for long and conspicuous service in civilian and military careers.

The order effectively replaced national orders such as the Civil Order of Savoy (1831), the Order of the Crown of Italy (1868), the Order of Saints Maurice and Lazarus (1572) and the Supreme Order of the Most Holy Annunciation (1362). (Note: Today, these continue merely as dynastic orders of the former Royal House of Savoy. Whilst their bestowal is suppressed by law in Italy, the continued use of those decorations conferred prior to 1951 is permitted, exclusive of any right of precedence in official ceremonies.)

== Grades ==
Investiture takes place twice a year – on 2 June, the anniversary of the foundation of the Republic, and on 27 December, the anniversary of the promulgation of the Italian Constitution. However, those awards on Presidential motu proprio, related to termination of service or granted to foreigners, may be made at any time.

The badge, modified in 2001, bears the inscription Al Merito della Repubblica encircling the national coat of arms on the obverse and the Latin Patriæ Unitati (for the union of the country) and Civium Libertati (for the liberty of the citizens) encircling the head of Italia turrita on the reverse. The six degrees with corresponding ribbons are as follows (with numbers to 2 June 2020):

Ribbon (1951–2001)	Ribbon (since 2001)	Class (English)	Full title in Italian	Awards
		Knight Grand Cross with Collar	Cavaliere di Gran Croce Decorato di Gran Cordone Ordine al Merito della Repubblica Italiana	201
		1st Class / Knight Grand Cross	Cavaliere di Gran Croce Ordine al Merito della Repubblica Italiana	9,178
		2nd Class / Grand Officer	Grande Ufficiale Ordine al Merito della Repubblica Italiana	24,830
		3rd Class / Commander	Commendatore Ordine al Merito della Repubblica Italiana	48,184
		4th Class / Officer	Ufficiale Ordine al Merito della Repubblica Italiana	33,442
		5th Class / Knight	Cavaliere Ordine al Merito della Repubblica Italiana	146,390

The order is bestowed by decree of the President of the Italian Republic, as head of the orders of knighthood, on the recommendation of the President of the Council of Ministers. Except in exceptional circumstances, no one can be awarded for the first time a rank higher than Knight. The minimum age requirement is normally 35.

The Knight Grand Cross with Collar is awarded only to heads of state.

== Recipients ==
=== Grand Cross with Collar ===
- Presidency of Luigi Einaudi (12 May 1948 – 11 May 1955):

Date	Recipient
28 December 1952	Greece – King Paul I (1947–1964)
11 March 1953	Brazil – President Getúlio Vargas (1930–1945; 1951–1954)
30 May 1953	Monaco – Prince Rainier III (1949–2005)
16 July 1953	Lebanon – President Camille Chamoun (1952–1958)
6 October 1953	Venezuela – President Marcos Pérez Jiménez (1953–1958)
16 November 1953	Argentina – President Juan Domingo Perón (1946–1955; 1973–1974)
31 December 1953	Germany – President Theodor Heuss (1949–1959)
13 February 1954	Haiti – President Paul Magloire (1950–1956)
31 July 1954	Dominican Republic – President Rafael Trujillo (1930–1938; 1942–1952)
6 September 1954	Chile – President Carlos Ibanez del Campo (1927–1931; 1952–1958)
17 November 1954	Sovereign Order of Malta – Lieutenant Grand Master Fra' Antonio Hercolani Fava Simonetti (1951–1955)
6 December 1954	France – President René Coty (1954–1959)
12 February 1955	El Salvador – President Óscar Osorio (1950–1956)

- Presidency of Giovanni Gronchi (11 May 1955 – 11 May 1962):

Date	Recipient
11 May 1955	Italy – Former President Luigi Einaudi (1948–1955)
21 October 1955	Ethiopia – Emperor Haile Selassie (1930–1974)
16 January 1956	Brazil – President Juscelino Kubitschek (1956–1961)
5 June 1956	Italy – Former President Enrico De Nicola (1946–1948)
20 September 1956	Liberia – President William Tubman (1944–1971)
15 November 1956	Peru – President Manuel Prado Ugarteche (1939–1945; 1956–1962)
18 January 1957	Costa Rica – President José Figueres Ferrer (1948–1949; 1953–1958; 1970–1974)
6 March 1957	(Sovereign Military Order of Malta) Order of Malta – Lieutenant Grand Master Fra' Ernesto Paternò Castello di Carcaci (1955–1962)
11 March 1957	Ireland — President Seán T. O'Kelly (1945–1959)
13 May 1957	Turkey – President Celal Bayar (1950–1960)
11 June 1957	Panama – President Ernesto de la Guardia (1956–1960)
26 August 1957	Iran – Shah Mohammad Reza Pahlavi (1941–1979)
1 October 1957	El Salvador – President José María Lemus (1956–1960)
9 May 1958	United Kingdom – Queen Elizabeth II (1952–2022)
16 June 1959	France – President Charles De Gaulle (1959–1969)
11 June 1960	Argentina – President Arturo Frondizi (1958–1962)
8 September 1960	Finland – President Urho Kaleva Kekkonen (1956–1982)
22 September 1960	Thailand – King Bhumibol Adulyadej (1946–2016)
29 November 1960	Uruguay – President Benito Nardone (1960–1961)
6 April 1961	Uruguay – President Eduardo Víctor Haedo (1961–1962)

- Presidency of Antonio Segni (11 May 1962 – 6 December 1964):

Date	Recipient
25 May 1962	Tunisia – President Habib Bourguiba (1957–1987)
2 October 1962	Senegal – President Léopold Sédar Senghor (1960–1980)
8 October 1962	(Sovereign Military Order of Malta) Order of Malta – Prince and Grand Master Fra' Angelo de Mojana di Cologna (1962–1988)
27 November 1962	Greece – Crown Prince Constantine
25 September 1963	Ghana – President Kwame Nkrumah (1960–1966)
2 October 1963	Somalia – President Aden Adde (1960–1967)
20 April 1964	Denmark – King Frederik IX (1947–1972)
18 June 1964	Uruguay – President Luis Giannattasio (1964–1965)

- Presidency of Giuseppe Saragat (29 December 1964 – 29 December 1971):

Date	Recipient
16 June 1965	Peru – President Fernando Belaúnde Terry (1963–1968; 1980–1985)
20 June 1965	Mexico – President Gustavo Díaz Ordaz (1964–1970)
21 June 1965	Norway – King Olav V (1957–1991)
2 July 1965	Chile – President Eduardo Frei Montalva (1964–1970)
8 August 1965	Germany – President Heinrich Lübke (1959–1969)
8 September 1965	Venezuela – President Raúl Leoni (1964–1969)
8 September 1965	Argentina – President Arturo Umberto Illia (1963–1966)
8 September 1965	Brazil – President Humberto de Alencar Castelo Branco (1964–1967)
21 October 1965	Poland – Chairman of the Council of State Edward Ochab (1964–1968)
11 June 1966	Belgium – King Baudouin (1951–1993)
14 June 1966	Sweden – King Gustaf VI Adolf (1950–1973)
28 November 1966	El Salvador – President Julio Adalberto Rivera Carballo (1962–1967)
20 March 1968	Yemen – Former Vice President General Mohamed Kaid Saif Qubaty (1963–1964)
8 August 1969	Ivory Coast – President Félix Houphouët-Boigny (1960–1993)
2 October 1969	Yugoslavia – President Josip Broz Tito (1953–1980)

- Presidency of Giovanni Leone (29 December 1971 – 15 June 1978):

Date	Recipient
30 December 1971	Austria – President Franz Jonas (1965–1974)
23 November 1972	Indonesia – President Suharto (1968–1998)
21 March 1973	Germany – President Gustav Heinemann (1969–1974)
8 May 1973	Zaire – President Mobutu Sese Seko (1965–1997)
21 May 1973	Romania – President of the State Council Nicolae Ceaușescu (1967–1989)
8 June 1973	Saudi Arabia – King Faisal (1964–1975)
1 October 1973	France – President Georges Pompidou (1969–1974)
23 October 1973	Netherlands – Queen Juliana (1948–1980)
23 October 1973	Netherlands – Prince Bernhard (1948–1980)
26 October 1973	Luxembourg – Grand Duke Jean (1964–2000)
21 November 1973	Gabon – President Omar Bongo (1967–2009)
8 February 1974	Mexico – President Luis Echeverría (1970–1976)
22 April 1974	Oman – Sultan Qaboos bin Said al Said (1970–2020)
15 December 1974	Iran – Prince Reza Pahlavi
15 December 1974	Iran – Shahbanu Farah Pahlavi (1961–1979)
6 April 1976	– President Anwar Sadat (1970–1981)
17 November 1976	– President Carlos Andrés Pérez (1974–1979; 1989–1993)
8 November 1977	Denmark – Queen Margrethe II (1972–2024)
29 April 1978	Turkey – President Fahri Korutürk (1973–1980)

- Presidency of Sandro Pertini (9 July 1978 – 29 June 1985):

Date	Recipient
18 September 1979	Germany – President Karl Carstens (1979–1984)
14 May 1980	Portugal – President António Ramalho Eanes (1976–1986)
26 May 1980	Spain – King Juan Carlos I (1975–2014)
18 November 1980	Greece – President Konstantinos Karamanlis (1980–1985; 1990–1995)
17 December 1980	Yugoslavia – President Cvijetin Mijatović (1980–1981)
30 March 1981	Mexico – President José López Portillo (1976–1982)
30 March 1981	Costa Rica – President Rodrigo Carazo Odio (1978–1982)
1 April 1981	Colombia – President Julio César Turbay Ayala (1978–1982)
14 October 1981	Mozambique – President Samora Machel (1975–1986)
30 January 1982	Egypt – President Hosni Moubarak (1981–2011)
9 March 1982	Japan – Emperor Hirohito (1926–1989)
5 July 1982	France – President François Mitterrand (1981–1995)
26 November 1983	Jordan – King Hussein (1952–1999)
20 June 1984	Costa Rica – President Luis Alberto Monge (1982–1986)
11 March 1985	Argentina – President Raúl Alfonsín (1983–1989)
27 March 1985	Netherlands – Queen Beatrix (1980–2013)
27 March 1985	Netherlands – Prince Claus (1980–2002)

- Presidency of Francesco Cossiga (3 July 1985 – 28 April 1992):

Date	Recipient
24 April 1986	Germany – President Richard von Weizsäcker (1984–1994)
25 July 1986	Ireland – President Patrick John Hillery (1976–1990)
5 October 1987	Iceland – President Vigdís Finnbogadóttir (1980–1996)
6 June 1988	Venezuela – President Jaime Lusinchi (1984–1989)
16 June 1988	Philippines – President Corazon Aquino (1986–1992)
5 April 1989	Portugal – President Mario Soares (1986–1996)
12 May 1989	Poland – President Wojciech Jaruzelski (1989–1990)
22 May 1990	Order of Malta – Prince and Grand Master Fra' Andrew Bertie (1988–2008)
11 June 1990	San Marino – Captain Regent Ottaviano Rossi (1990)
11 June 1990	San Marino – Captain Regent Aldemiro Bartolini (1990)
8 April 1991	Sweden – King Carl XVI Gustav (1973–incumbent)
17 April 1991	Chile – President Patricio Aylwin (1990–1994)
15 July 1991	Hungary – President Árpád Göncz (1990–2000)
18 September 1991	Malta – President Censu Tabone (1989–1994)
19 December 1991	Russia – President Boris Yeltsin (1991–1999)
28 April 1992	Italy – President Francesco Cossiga (1985–1992) self-awarded

- Presidency of Oscar Luigi Scalfaro (25 May 1992 – 15 May 1999):

Date	Recipient
5 October 1992	Argentina – President Carlos Menem (1989–1999)
27 January 1993	Austria – President Thomas Klestil (1992–2004)
14 September 1993	Finland – President Mauno Koivisto (1982–1994)
3 May 1995	Ukraine – President Leonid Kuchma (1994–2005)
24 June 1995	Brazil – President Fernando Henrique Cardoso (1995–2002)
29 June 1995	Venezuela – President Rafael Caldera (1994–1999)
19 July 1995	Chile – President Eduardo Frei Ruiz-Tagle (1994–2000)
21 July 1995	Uruguay – President Julio María Sanguinetti (1985–1990; 1995–2000)
16 November 1995	Malta – President Ugo Mifsud Bonnici (1994–1999)
26 March 1996	Mexico – President Ernesto Zedillo (1994–2000)
23 April 1996	Albania – President Sali Berisha (1992–1997)
28 May 1996	Poland – President Aleksander Kwaśniewski (1995–2005)
7 October 1996	Turkey – President Süleyman Demirel (1993–2000)
28 January 1997	Finland – President Martti Ahtisaari (1994–2000)
20 April 1997	Germany – President Roman Herzog (1994–1999)
2 May 1997	Uzbekistan – President Islam Karimov (1991–2016)
4 May 1997	Kazakhstan – President Nursultan Nazarbayev (1990–2019)
20 May 1997	Lithuania – President Algirdas Brazauskas (1992–1998)
21 May 1997	Latvia – President Guntis Ulmanis (1993–1999)
22 May 1997	Estonia – President Lennart Meri (1992–2001)
19 July 1997	Saudi Arabia – King Fahd (1982–2005)
5 November 1997	Lebanon – President Elias Hrawi (1989–1998)
13 November 1997	Slovakia – President Michal Kovac (1993–1998)
3 March 1998	San Marino – Captain Regent Marino Zanotti (1998)
3 March 1998	San Marino – Captain Regent Luigi Mazza (1998)
12 April 1998	Japan – Emperor Akihito (1989–2019)
12 May 1998	Belgium – King Albert II (1993–2013)
19 January 1999	Dominican Republic – President Leonel Fernández (1996–2000; 2008–2012)
19 February 1999	Palestine – President Yasser Arafat (1994–2004)
23 February 1999	Lithuania – President Valdas Adamkus (1998–2003; 2004–2009)

- Presidency of Carlo Azeglio Ciampi (18 May 1999 – 15 May 2006):

Date	Recipient
21 October 1999	France – President Jacques Chirac (1995–2007)
15 November 1999	Algeria – President Abdelaziz Bouteflika (1999–2019)
2 March 2000	South Korea – President Kim Dae-Jung (1998–2003)
3 March 2000	Chile – President Ricardo Lagos (2000–2006)
11 April 2000	Morocco – King Mohammed VI (1999–incumbent)
26 April 2000	Qatar – Emir Hamad bin Khalifa Al Thani (1995–2013)
23 January 2001	Greece – President Konstantinos Stephanopoulos (1995–2005)
9 February 2001	Jordan – King Abdullah II (1999–incumbent)
7 March 2001	Argentina – President Fernando de la Rúa (1999–2001)
7 March 2001	Uruguay – President Jorge Batlle (2000–2005)
19 October 2001	Norway – King Harald V (1991–2026)
27 November 2001	Portugal – President Jorge Sampaio (1996–2006)
14 January 2002	Serbia and Montenegro – President Vojislav Koštunica (2000–2003)
6 March 2002	South Africa – President Thabo Mbeki (1999–2008)
11 March 2002	San Marino – Captain Regent Gino Giovagnoli (2002)
11 March 2002	San Marino – Captain Regent Alberto Cecchetti (2002)
22 March 2002	Germany – President Johannes Rau (1999–2004)
27 March 2002	Czech Republic – President Václav Havel (1993–2003)
17 June 2002	Hungary – President Ferenc Mádl (2000–2005)
28 June 2002	Slovakia – President Rudolf Schuster (1999–2004)
4 December 2002	Peru – President Alejandro Toledo (2001–2006)
14 March 2003	Luxembourg – Grand Duke Henri (2000–2025)
9 June 2003	Malaysia – King Sirajuddin of Perlis (2001–2006)
16 January 2004	Malta – President Guido de Marco (1999–2004)
8 April 2004	Latvia – President Vaira Vīķe-Freiberga (1999–2007)
8 April 2004	Estonia – President Arnold Rüütel (2001–2006)
5 April 2005	Bulgaria – President Georgi Parvanov (2002–2012)
11 May 2005	Malta – President Edward Fenech Adami (2004–2009)
12 December 2005	Monaco – Albert II, Prince of Monaco (2005–incumbent)
18 January 2006	Greece – President Karolos Papoulias (2005–2015)
15 March 2006	Germany – President Horst Köhler (2004–2010)

- Presidency of Giorgio Napolitano (15 May 2006 – 14 January 2015):

Date	Recipient
11 October 2006	Ghana – President John Agyekum Kufour (2001–2009)
20 February 2007	Slovakia – President Ivan Gašparovič (2004–2014)
8 June 2007	Austria – President Heinz Fischer (2004–2016)
9 October 2007	Chile – President Michelle Bachelet (2006–2010; 2014–2018)
30 October 2007	Saudi Arabia – King Abdullah bin Abdul-Aziz al Saud (2005–2015)
1 September 2008	Finland – President Tarja Halonen (2000–2012)
14 October 2008	Lebanon – President Michel Suleiman (2008–2014)
27 October 2008	(Sovereign Military Order of Malta) Order of Malta – Prince and Grand Master Fra' Matthew Festing (2008–2017)
2 September 2009	South Korea – President Lee Myung-bak (2008–2013)
30 October 2009	Turkey – President Abdullah Gül (2007–2014)
11 March 2010	(Ba'athist Syria) – ~~President Bashar al-Assad (2000–2024)~~; Revoked by the President of the Republic on 28 September 2012 for "indignity"
25 April 2010	Malta – President George Abela (2009–2014)
26 April 2010	Kuwait – Emir Sabah Al-Ahmad Al-Jaber Al-Sabah (2006–2020)
11 January 2011	Slovenia – President Danilo Türk (2007–2012)
6 July 2011	Croatia – President Ivo Josipović (2010–2015)
7 September 2011	Romania – President Traian Băsescu (2004–2014)
10 June 2012	Poland – President Bronisław Komorowski (2010–2015)
15 November 2012	France – President François Hollande (2012–2017)
20 February 2013	Germany – President Joachim Gauck (2012–2017)
4 March 2014	Albania – President Bujar Nishani (2012–2017)
5 May 2014	Slovenia – President Borut Pahor (2012–2022)
4 June 2014	San Marino – Captain Regent Luca Beccari (2014)
4 June 2014	San Marino – Captain Regent Valeria Ciavatta (2014)

- Presidency of Sergio Mattarella (3 February 2015–incumbent):

Date	Recipient
23 November 2015	Greece – President Prokopis Pavlopoulos (2015–2020)
11 March 2016	Cameroon – President Paul Biya (1982–incumbent)
30 May 2016	Romania – President Klaus Iohannis (2014–2025)
21 June 2016	Mexico – President Enrique Peña Nieto (2012–2018)
4 August 2016	Bulgaria – President Rosen Plevneliev (2012–2017)
23 January 2017	Tunisia – President Beji Caid Essebsi (2014–2019)
2 May 2017	Argentina – President Mauricio Macri (2015–2019)
19 June 2017	Netherlands – King Willem-Alexander (2013–incumbent)
7 September 2017	Malta – President Marie Louise Coleiro Preca (2014–2019)
18 September 2017	Finland – President Sauli Niinistö (2012–2024)
29 November 2017	Portugal – President Marcelo Rebelo de Sousa (2016–2026)
5 June 2018	Estonia – President Kersti Kaljulaid (2016–2021)
22 June 2018	Lithuania – President Dalia Grybauskaitė (2009–2019)
26 June 2018	Latvia – President Raimonds Vējonis (2015–2019)
12 July 2018	Azerbaijan – President Ilham Aliyev (2003–incumbent)
25 July 2018	Armenia – President Armen Sarkissian (2018–2022)
27 June 2019	Austria – President Alexander Van der Bellen (2017–incumbent)
17 September 2019	Germany – President Frank-Walter Steinmeier (2017–incumbent)
6 October 2020	Greece – President Katerina Sakellaropoulou (2020–2025)
16 June 2021	San Marino – Captain Regent Marco Nicolini (2021)
16 June 2021	San Marino – Captain Regent Gian Carlo Venturini (2021)
1 July 2021	France – President Emmanuel Macron (2017–incumbent)
25 October 2021	Spain – King Felipe VI (2014–incumbent)
25 October 2021	Belgium – King Philippe (2013–incumbent)
3 November 2021	Algeria – President Abdelmadjid Tebboune (2019–incumbent)
1 June 2022	Georgia – President Salome Zourabichvili (2018–Disputed)
12 January 2023	Paraguay – President Mario Abdo Benítez (2018–2023)
13 April 2023	Poland – President Andrzej Duda (2015–2025)
19 May 2023	Angola – President João Lourenço (2017–incumbent)
5 June 2023	Iraq – President Abdul Latif Rashid (2022–2026)
7 October 2023	South Korea – President Yoon Suk Yeol (2022–2025)
21 November 2023	(Sovereign Military Order of Malta) Order of Malta – Prince and Grand Master John Timothy Dunlap (2023–incumbent)
6 December 2023	San Marino – Captain Regent Filippo Tamagnini (2023–2024)
6 December 2023	San Marino – Captain Regent Gaetano Troina (2023–2024)
14 February 2024	Cyprus – President Nikos Christodoulides (2023–incumbent)
18 March 2024	Malta – President George William Vella (2019–2024)
10 April 2024	Bulgaria – President Rumen Radev (2017–2026)
16 October 2024	Qatar – Emir Tamim bin Hamad Al Thani (2013–incumbent)
7 February 2025	Slovenia – President Nataša Pirc Musar (2022–incumbent)
14 February 2025	Montenegro – President Jakov Milatović (2023–incumbent)
19 February 2025	United Arab Emirates – President Sheikh Mohamed bin Zayed Al Nahyan (2022–incumbent)
1 April 2025	Estonia – President Alar Karis (2021–incumbent)
4 April 2025	United Kingdom – King Charles III (2022–incumbent)
29 September 2025	Kazakhstan – President Kassym-Jomart Tokayev (2019–incumbent)
11 June 2026	South Korea – President Lee Jae Myung (2025–incumbent)
20 October 2026	Thailand – Princess Sirivannavari (2026–incumbent)

== Wearer's guide ==
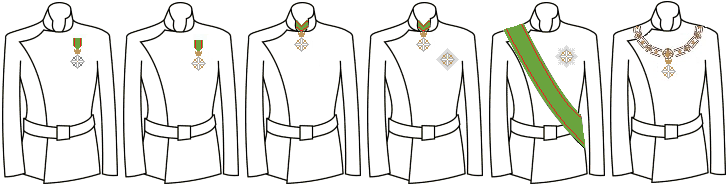
Wearer's guide for each grade (1951–2001)
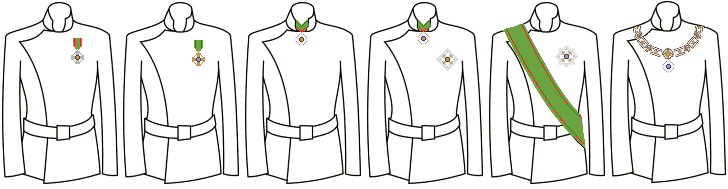
Wearer's guide for each grade (2001–present)

== Gallery ==
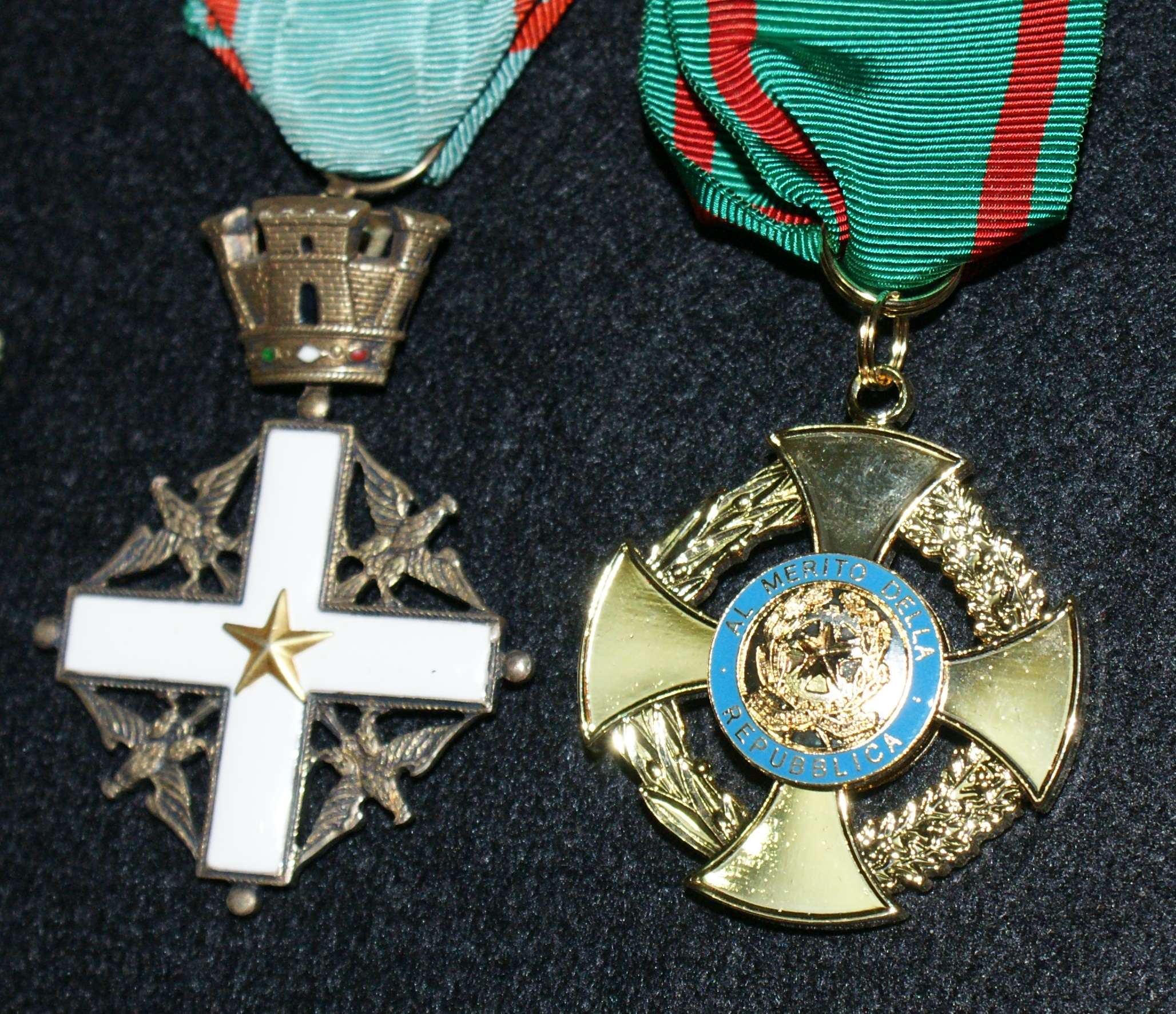
Comparison of the pre-2001 (at left) and the post-2001 (at right) badges of the Order

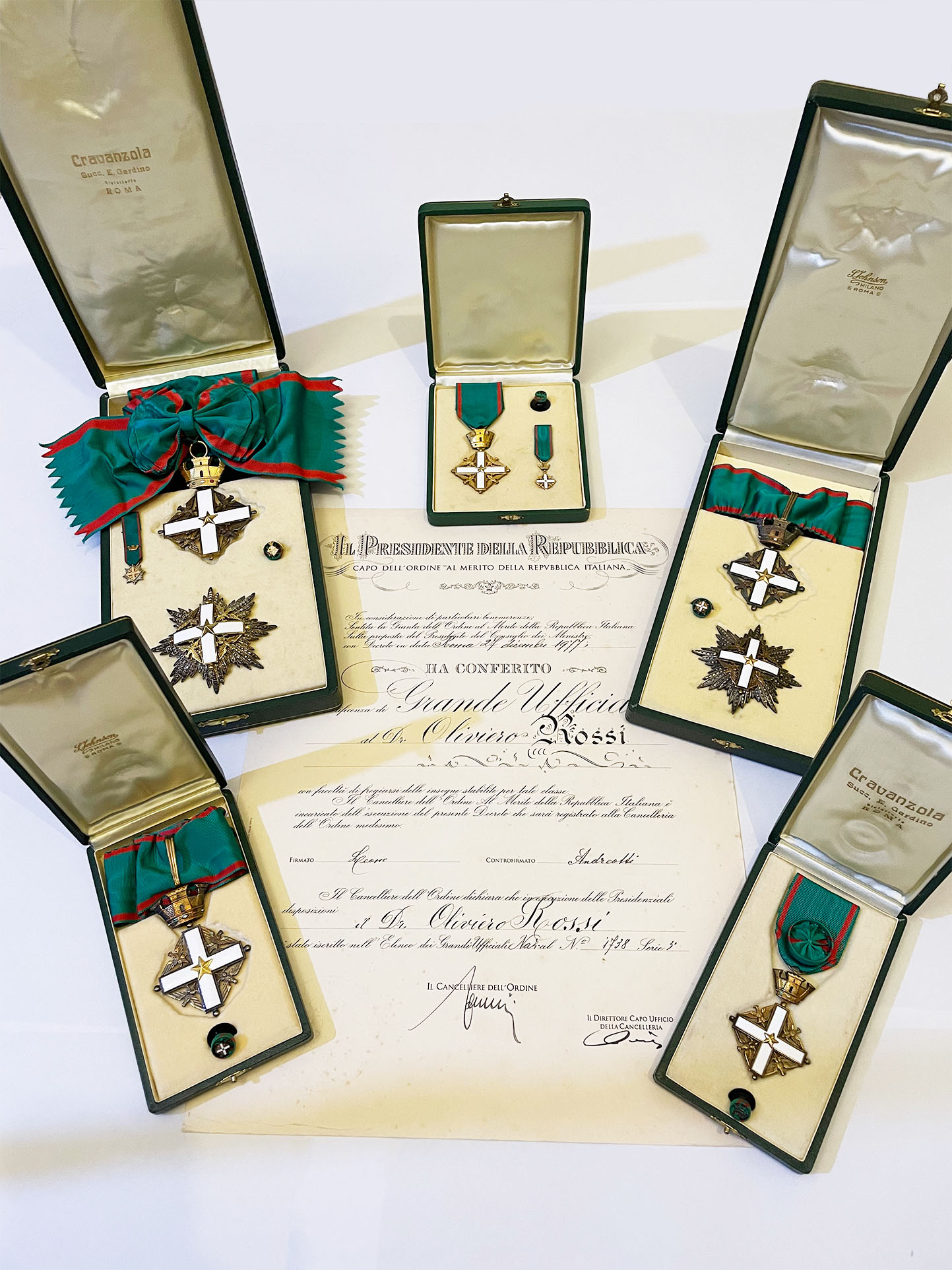
All grades of the Order (pre-2001)

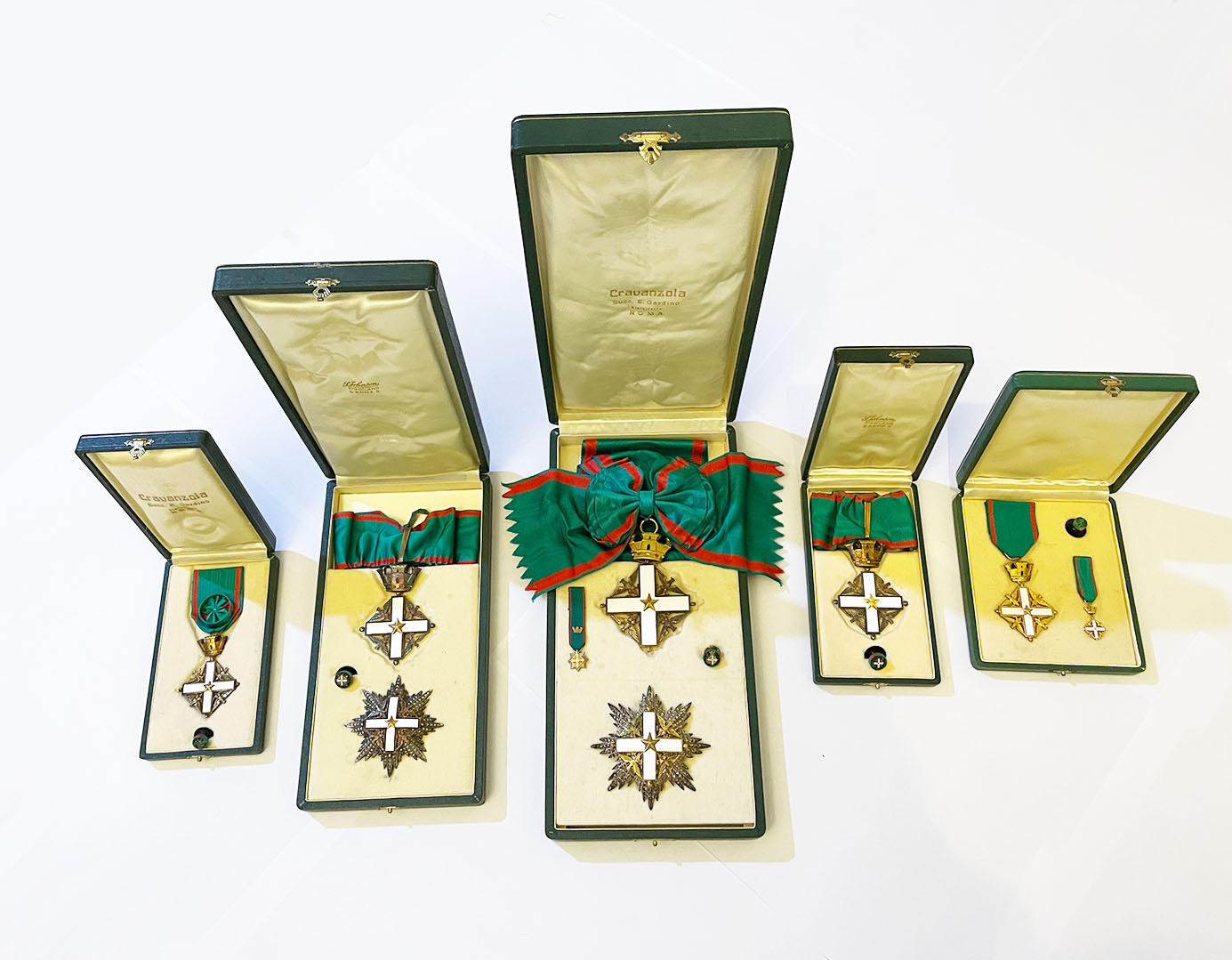
Five grades of the Order

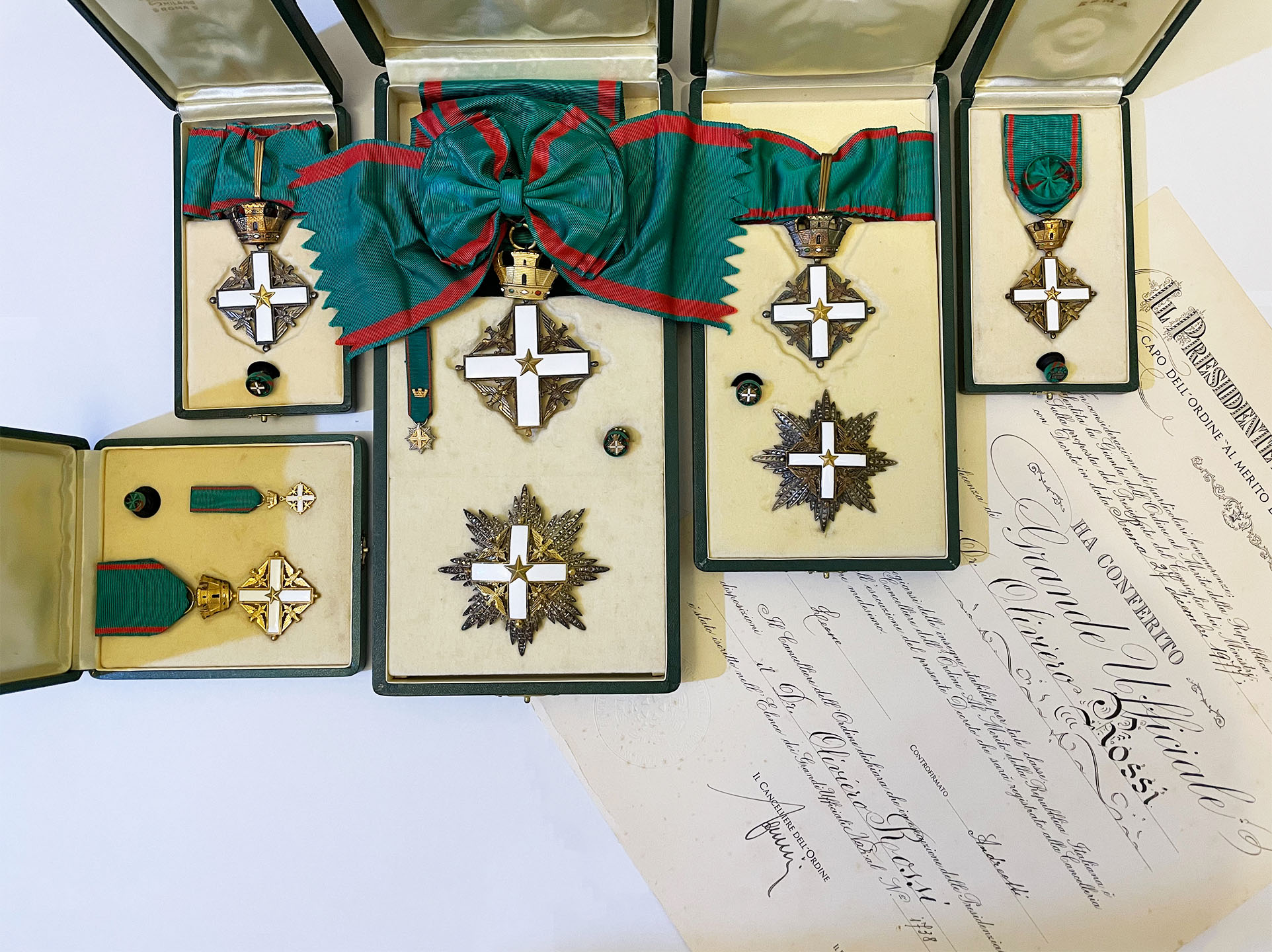
The pre-2001 grades of the Order

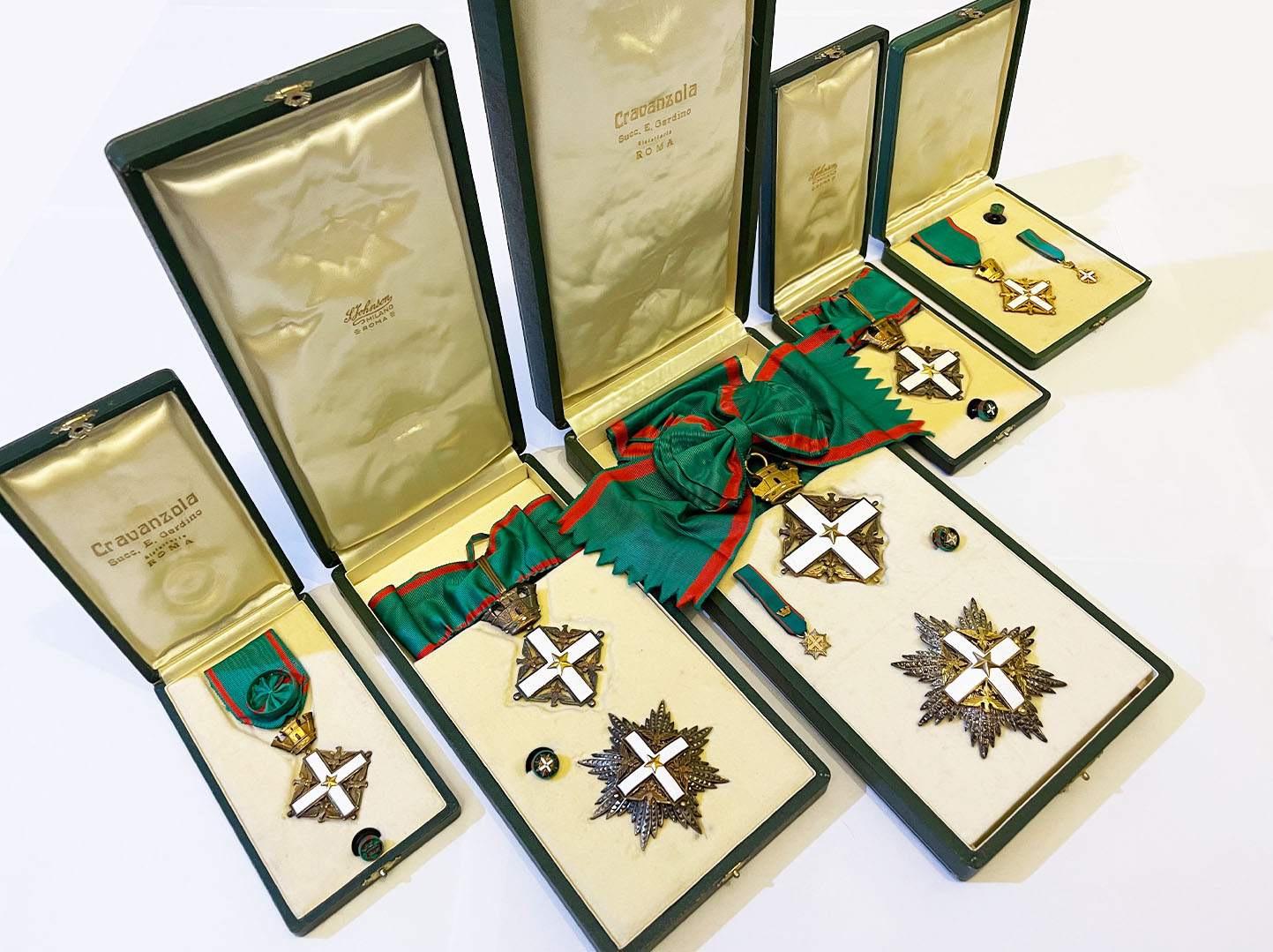
Knight, Officer, Commander, Grand Officer and Grand Cross grades

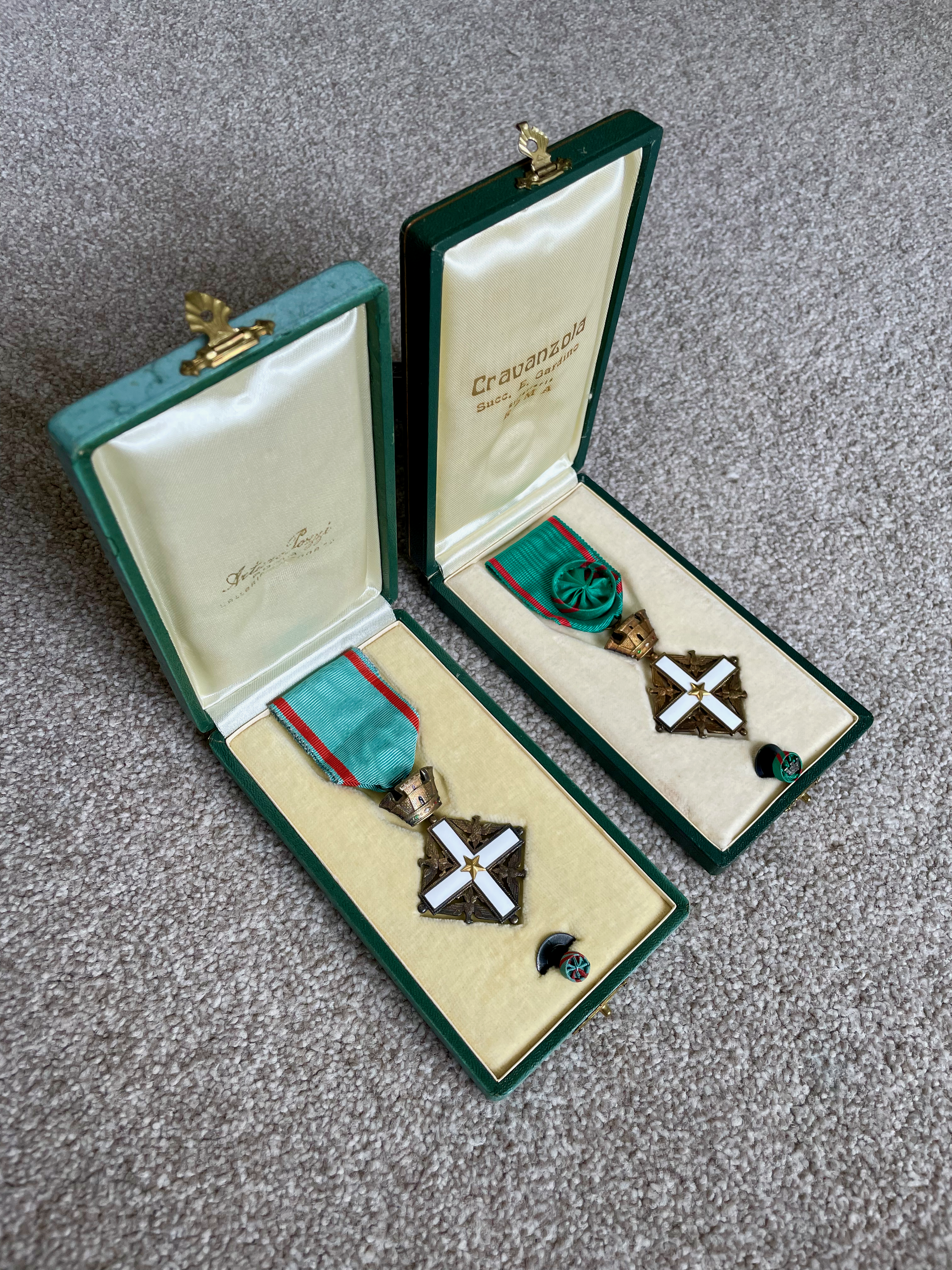
Knights and Officer Classes of the Order

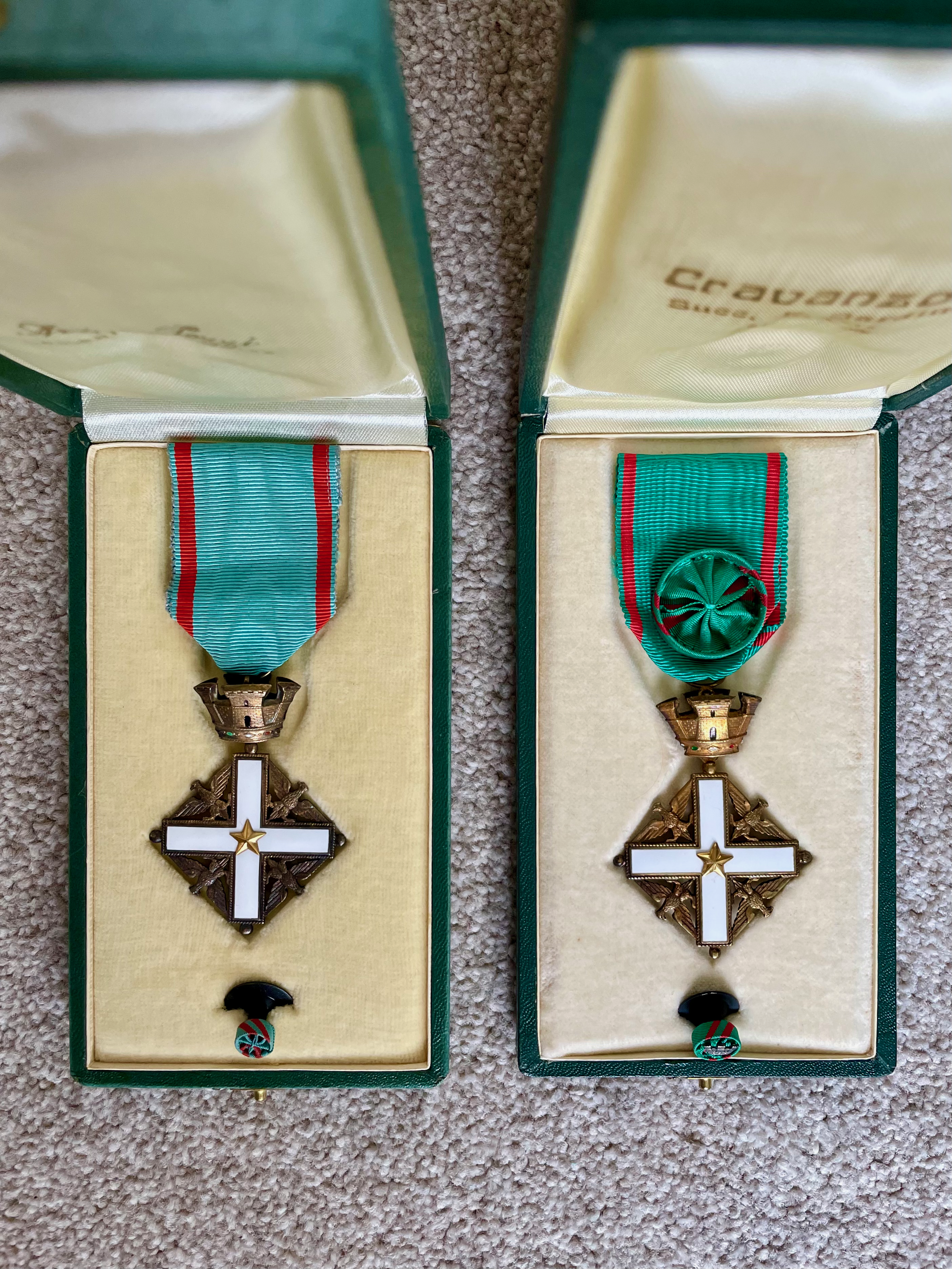
Knight 5th Class and Officer 4th Class grades

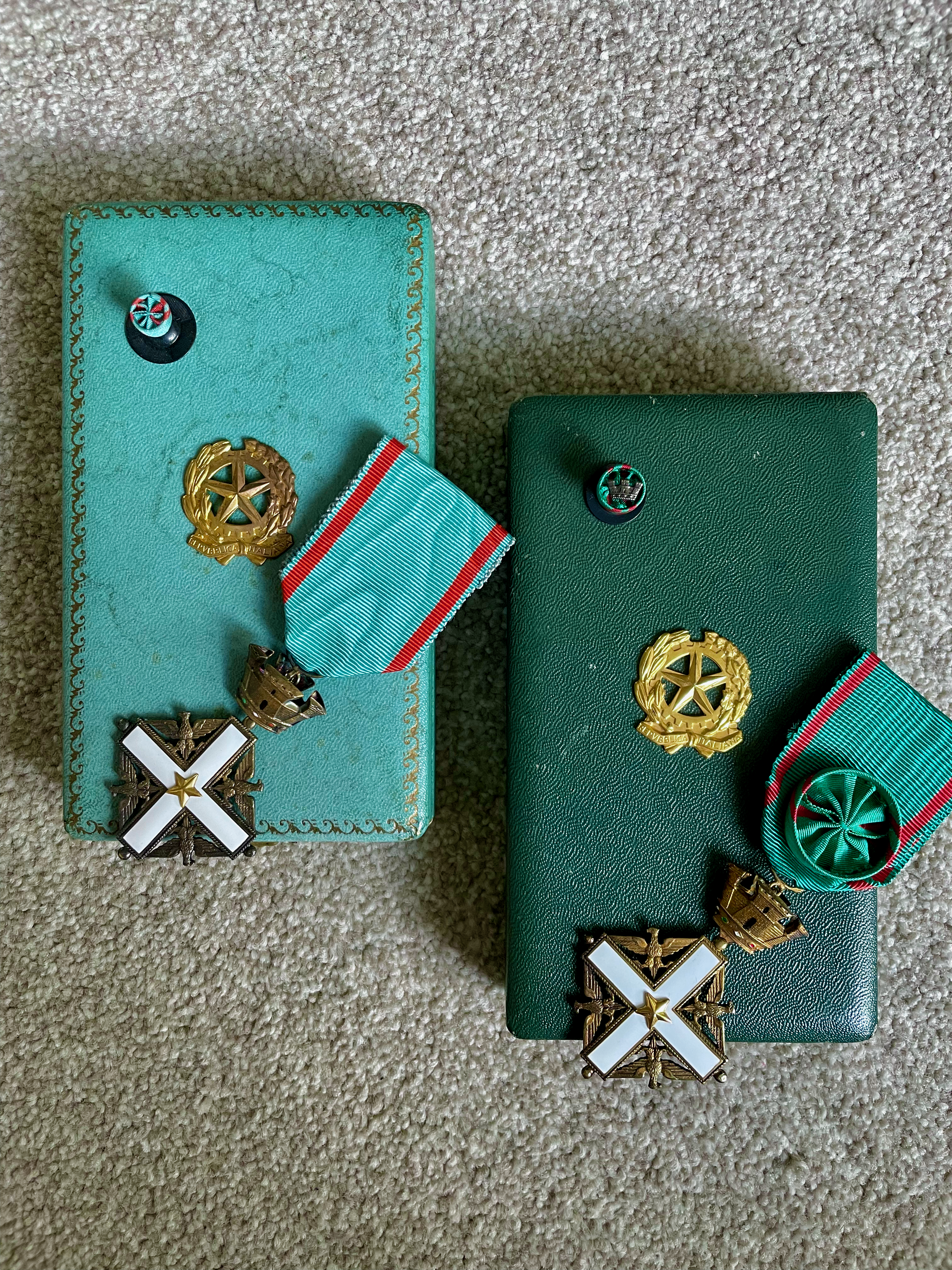
Sets of the Knight and Officer classes

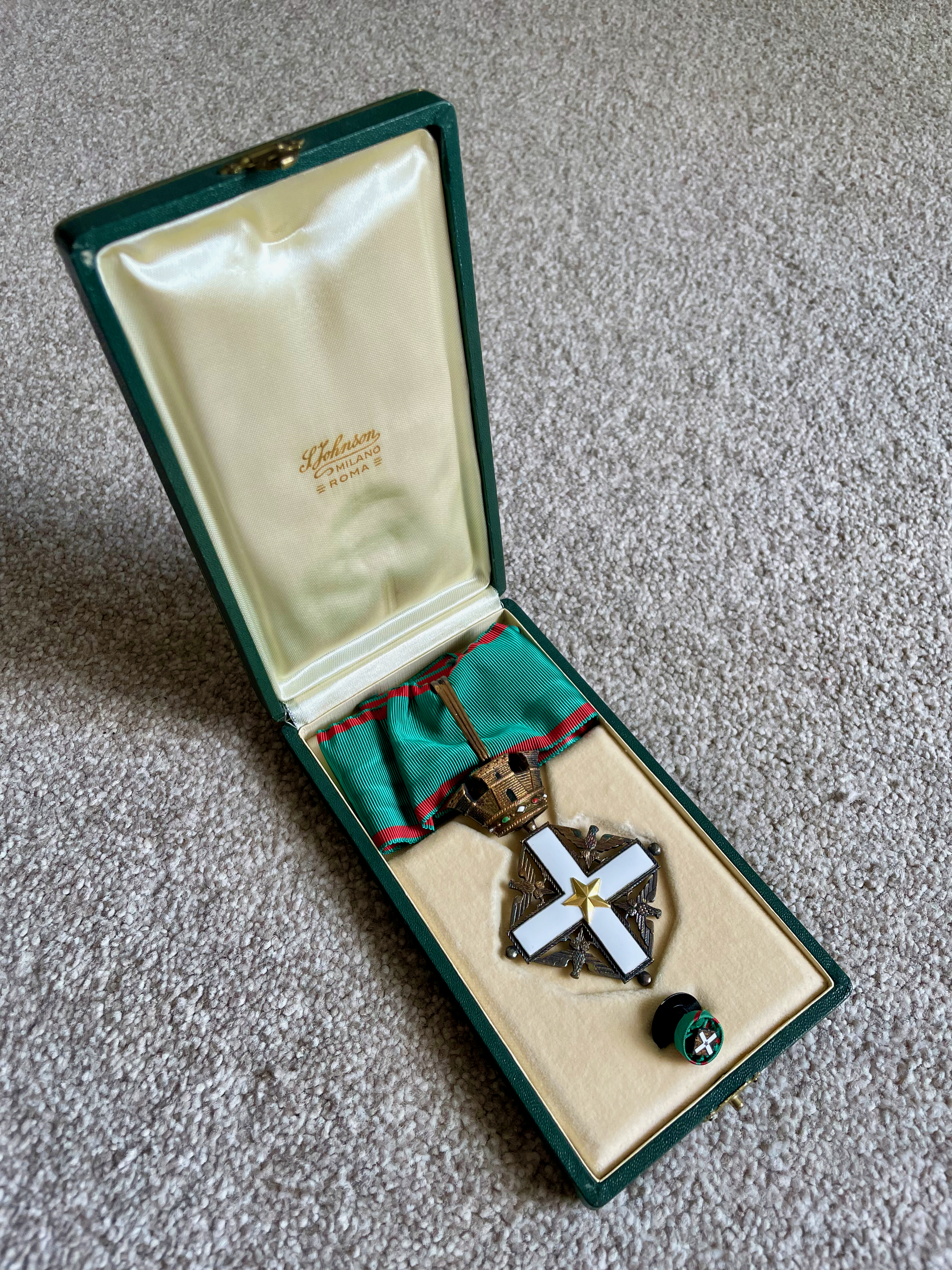
Commander 3rd Class of the Order

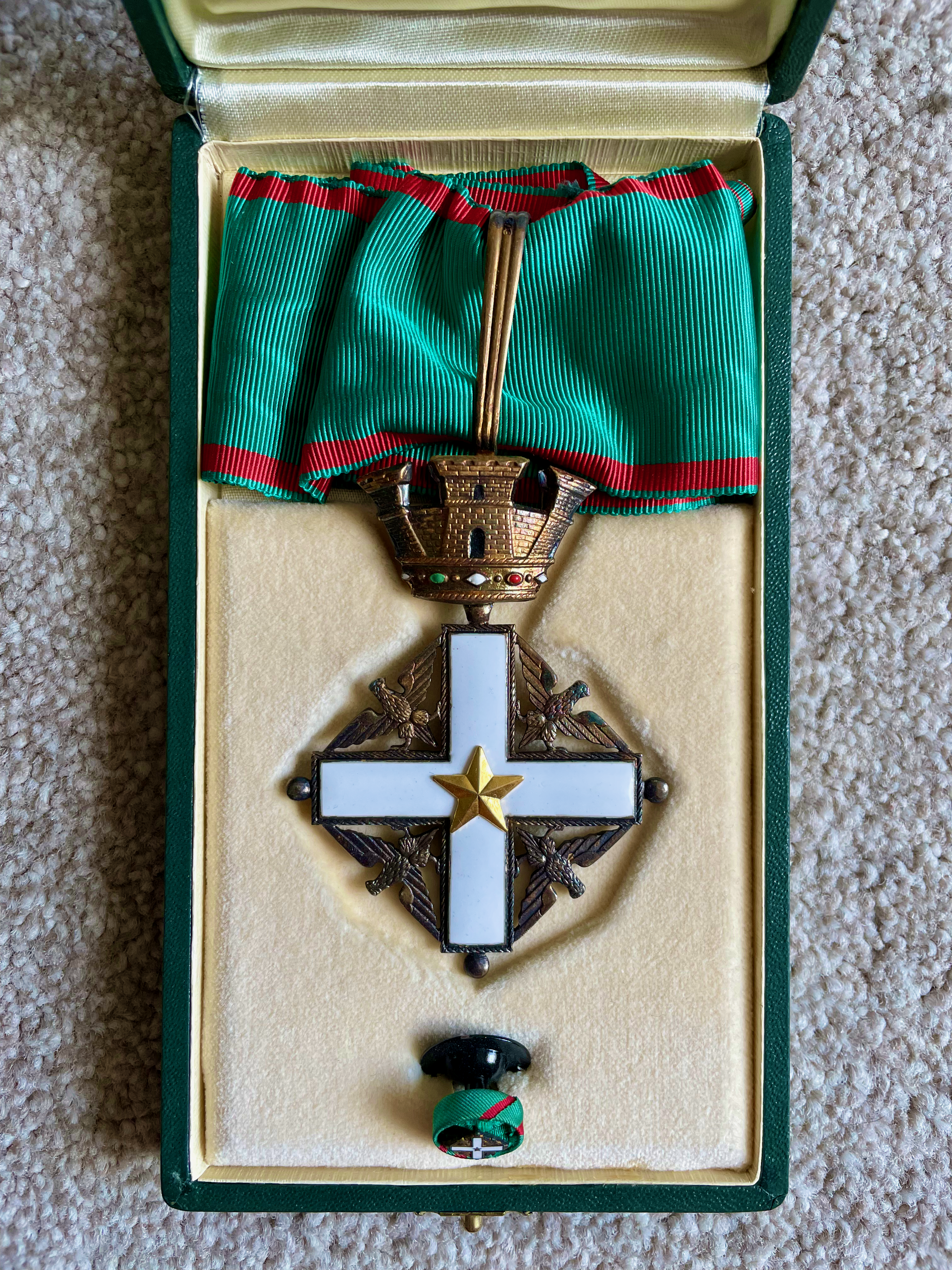
Commander set in case

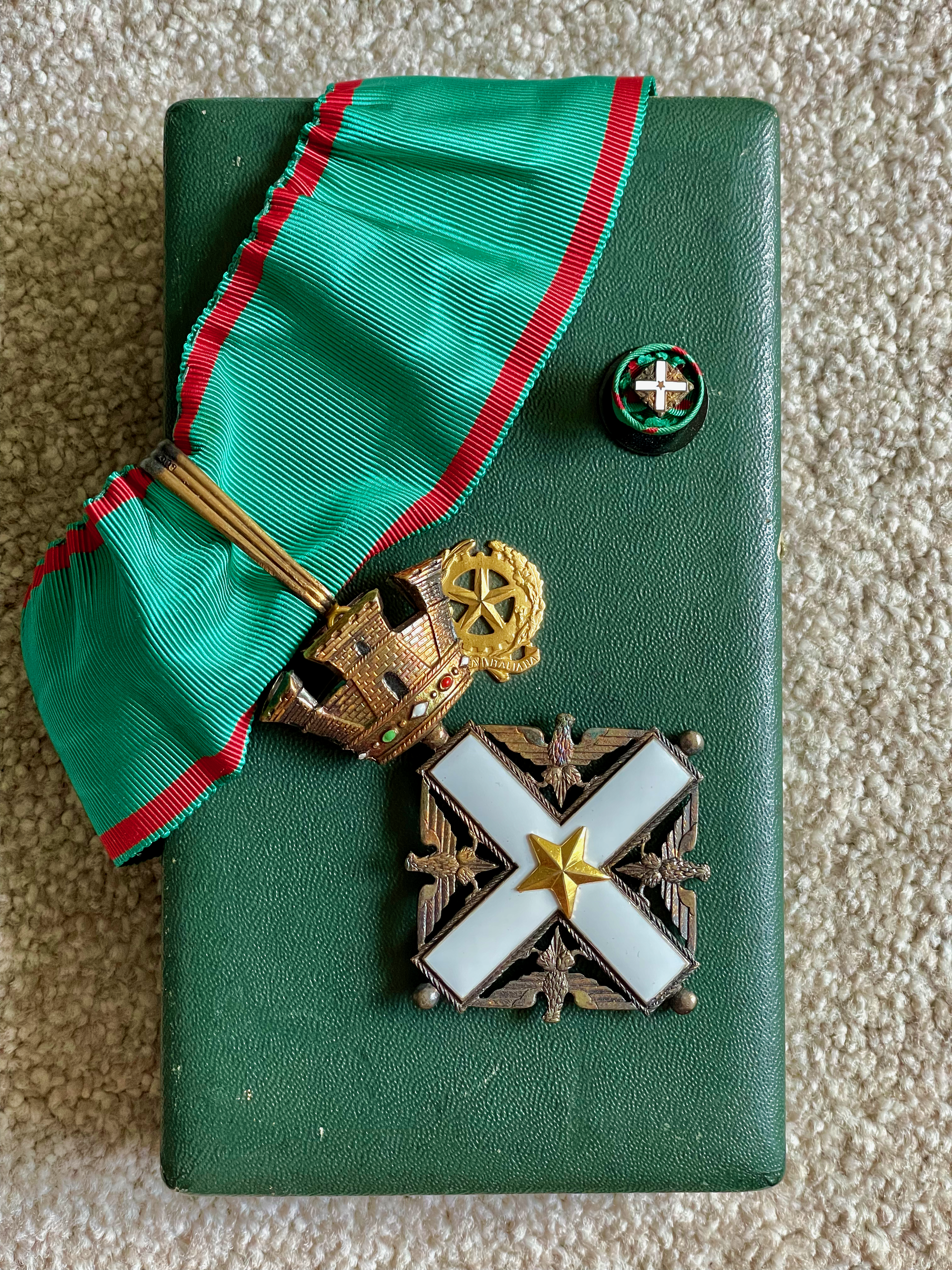
3rd Class set of the Order

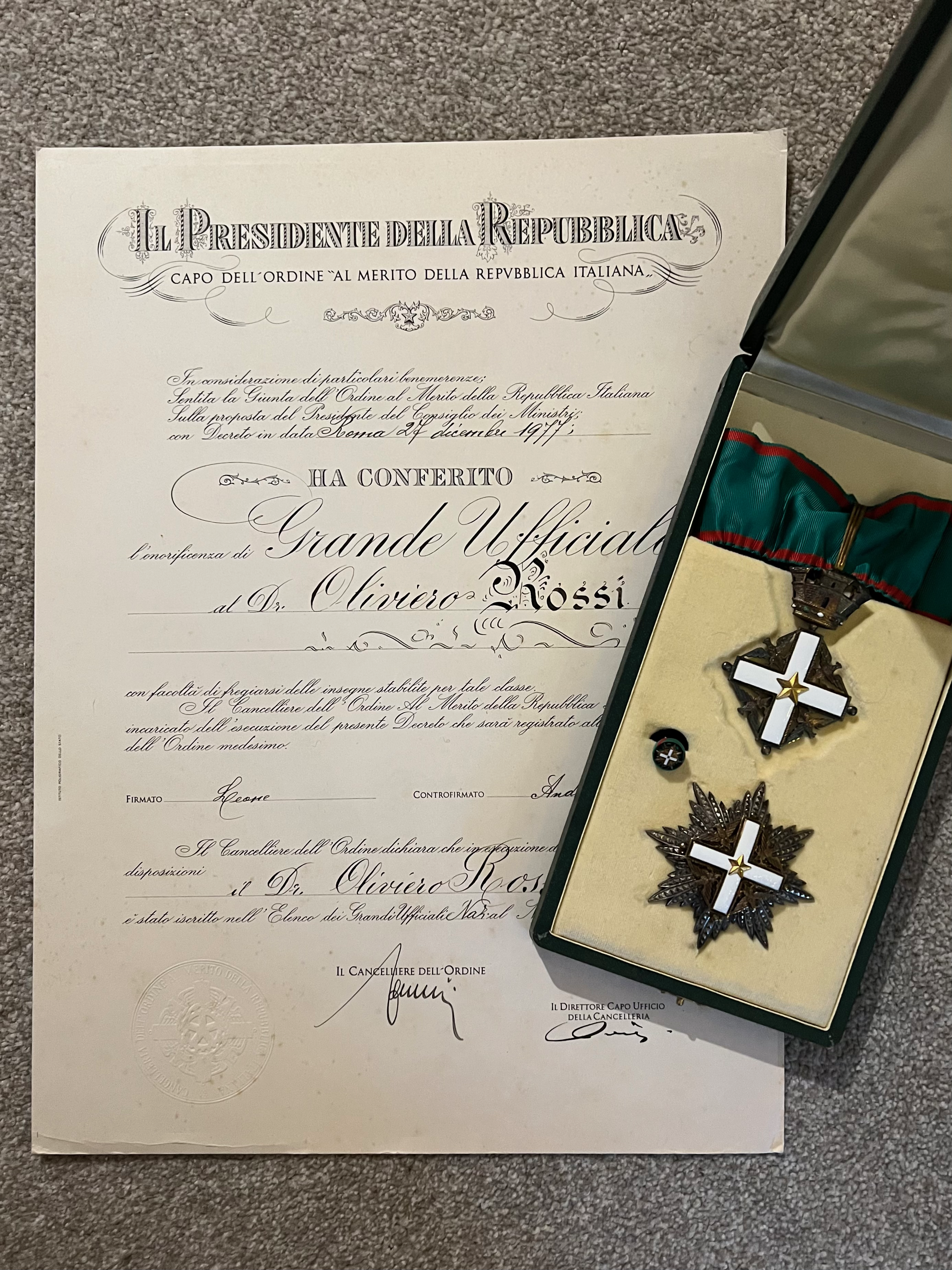
Bestowal document of a Grand Officer grade with the insignia

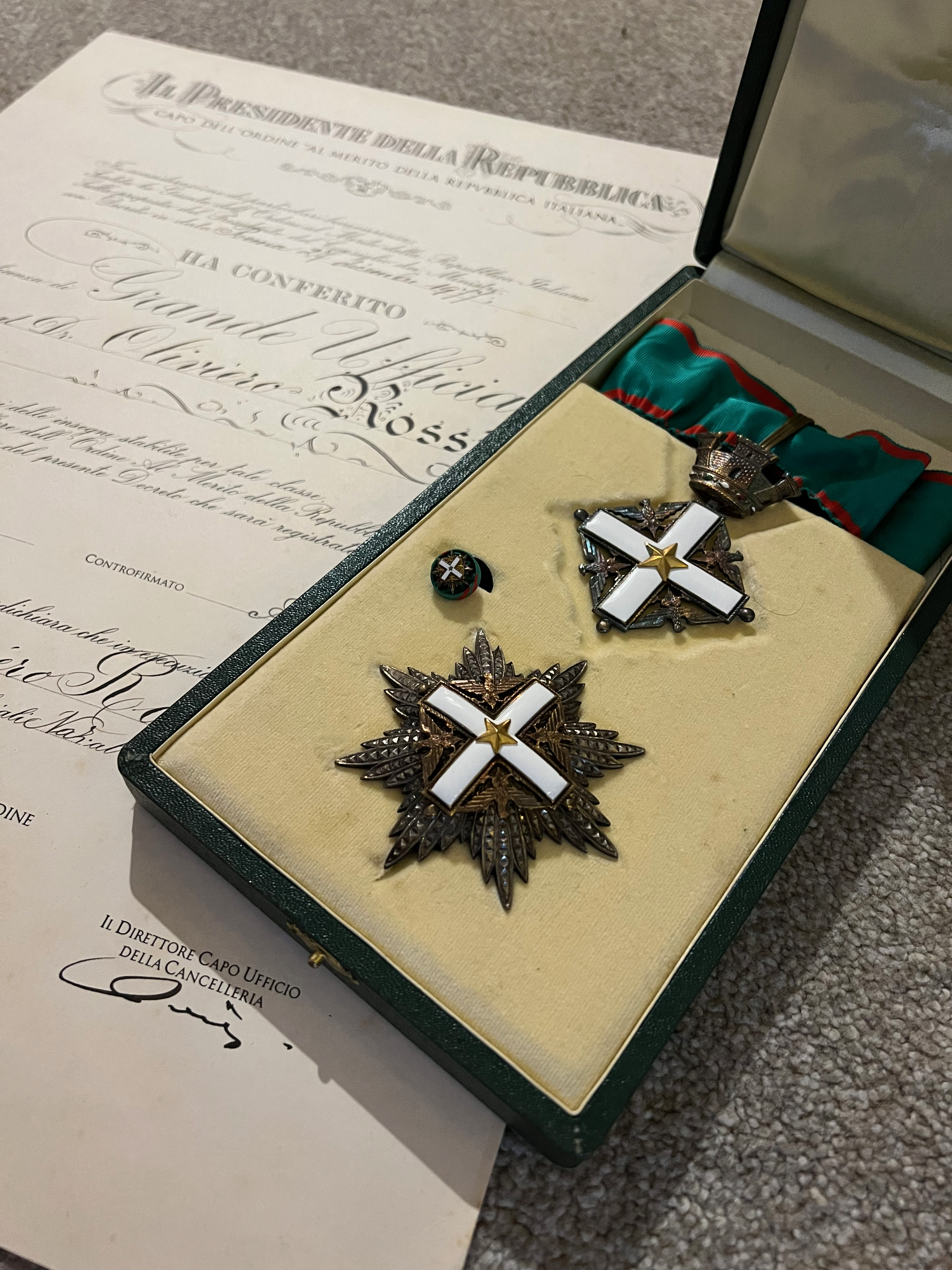
Grand Officer set of insignia with the bestowal document

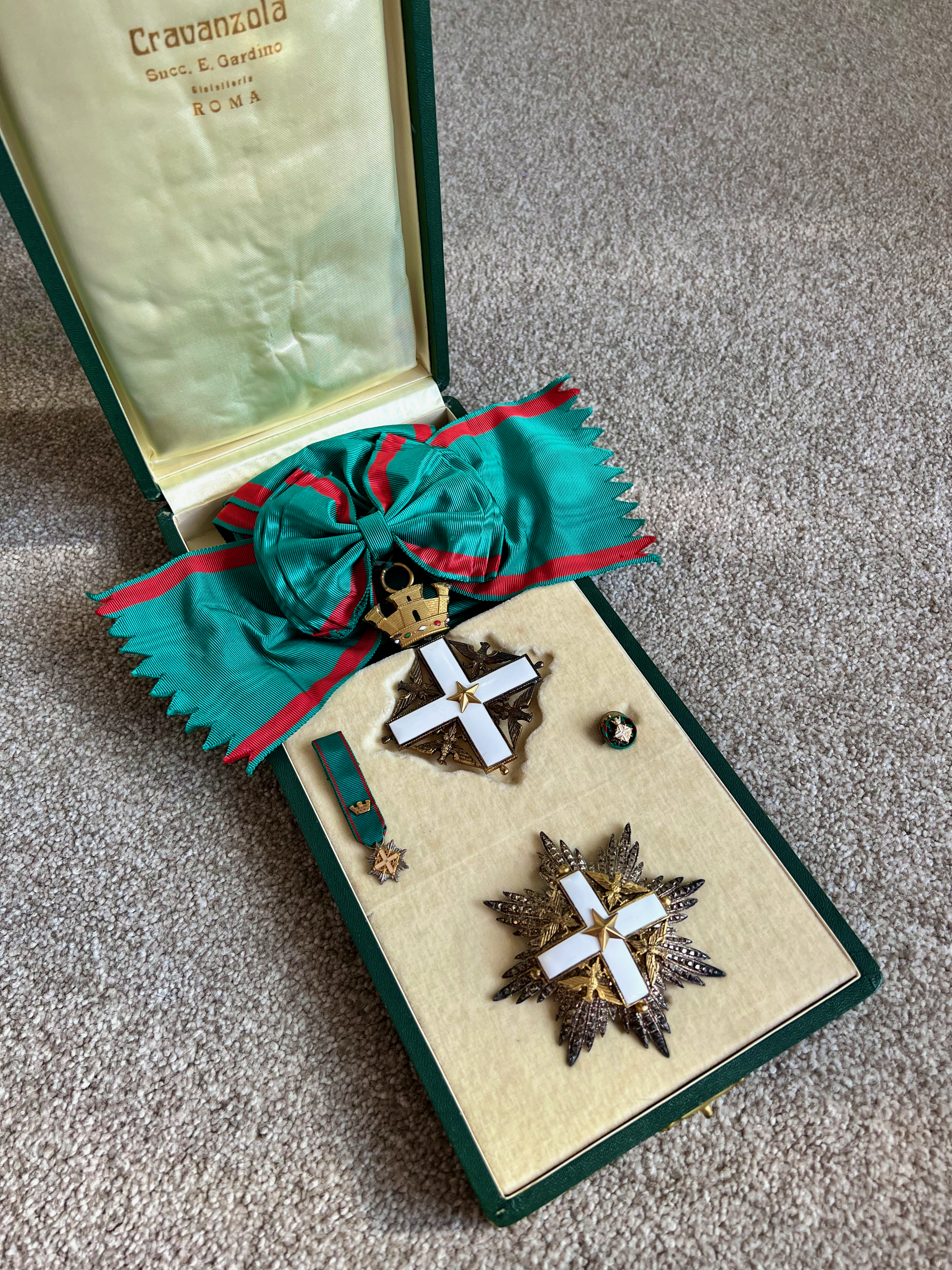
Grand Cross set of insignia

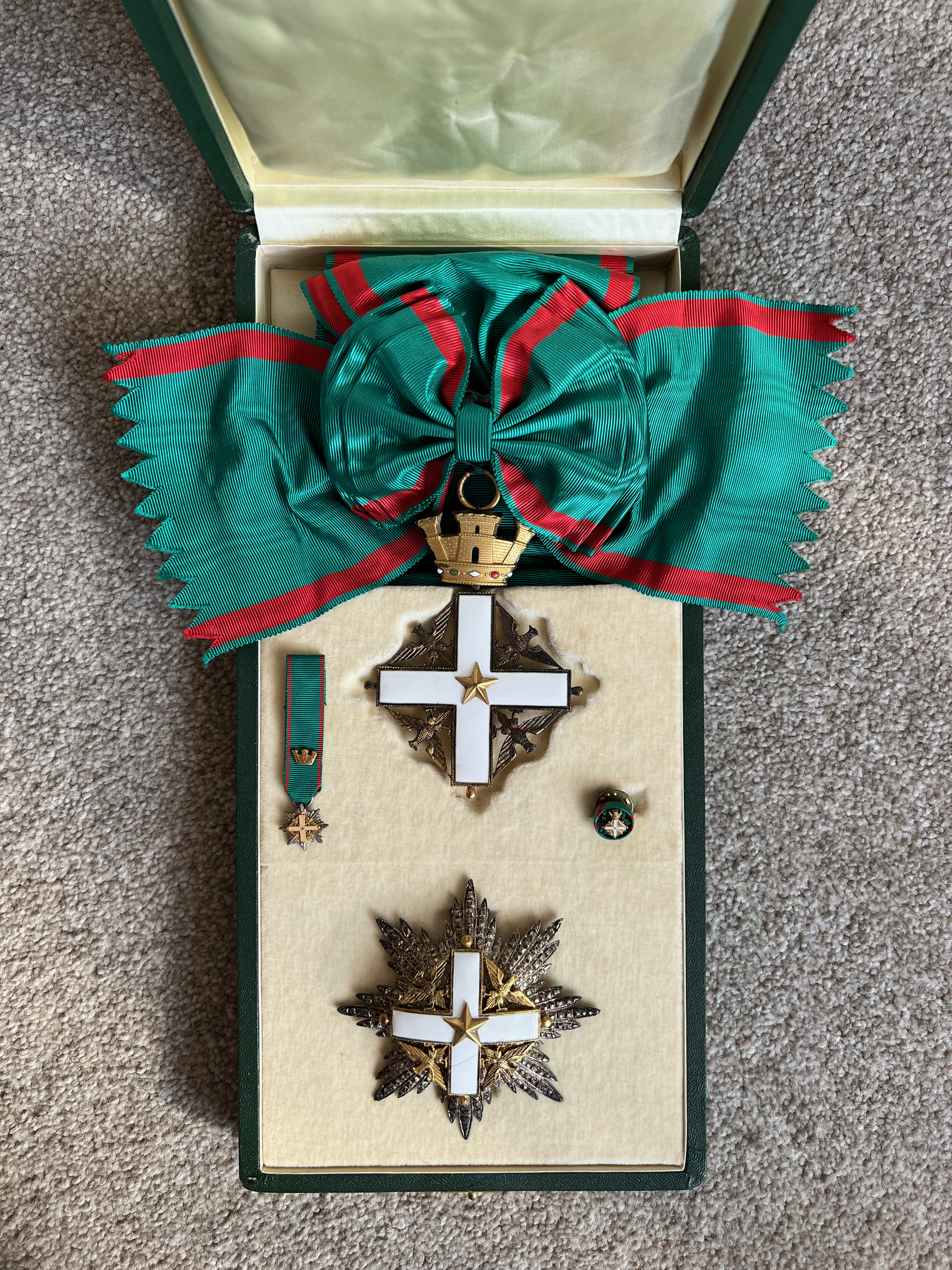
The Grand Cross grade of the Order in case of issue

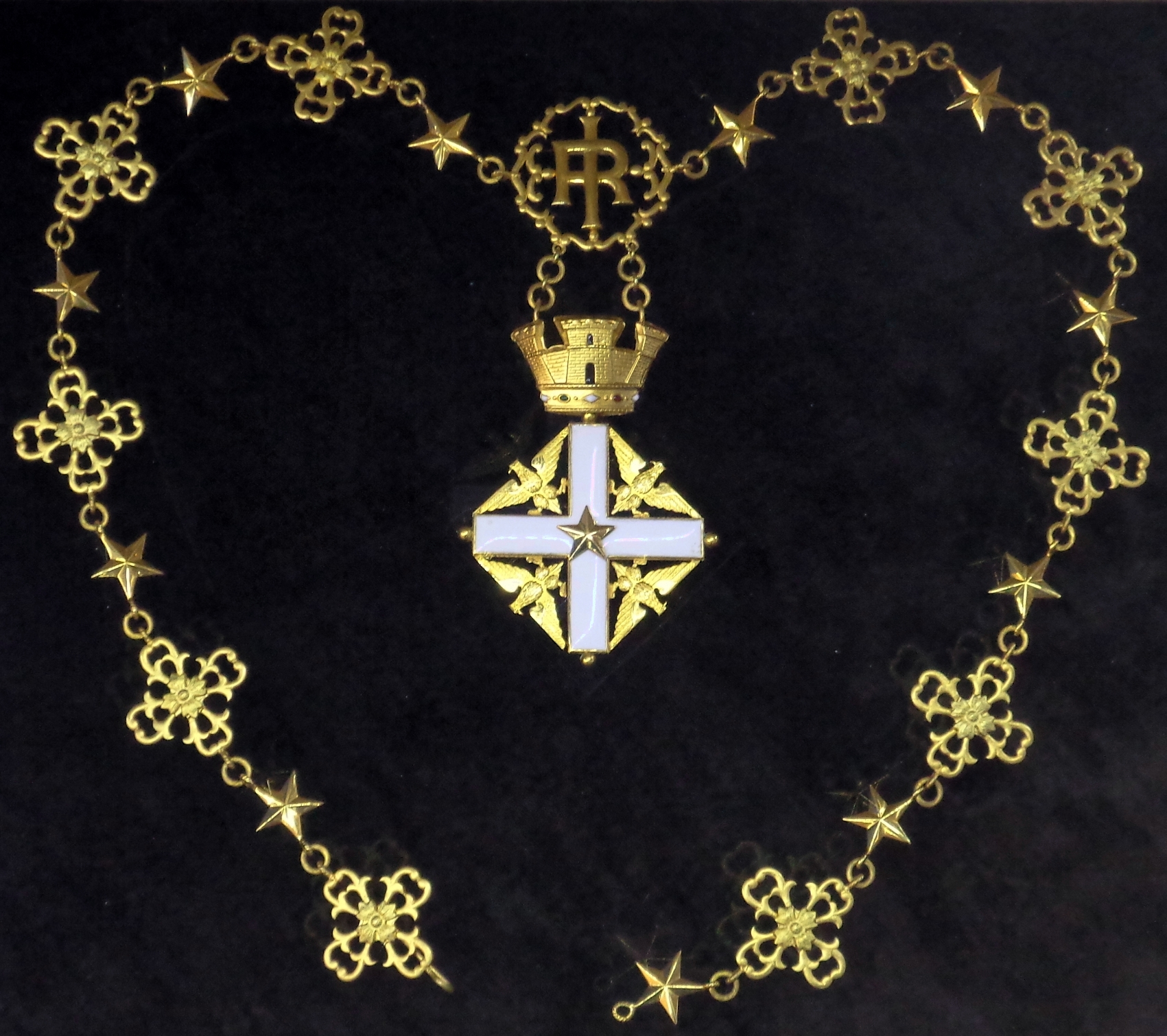
Collar of the Order (pre-2001)

== See also ==
- Orders, decorations, and medals of Italy
- Order of Saints Maurice and Lazarus
- Supreme Order of the Most Holy Annunciation
