= Alessandro Borgia (1783–1871) =

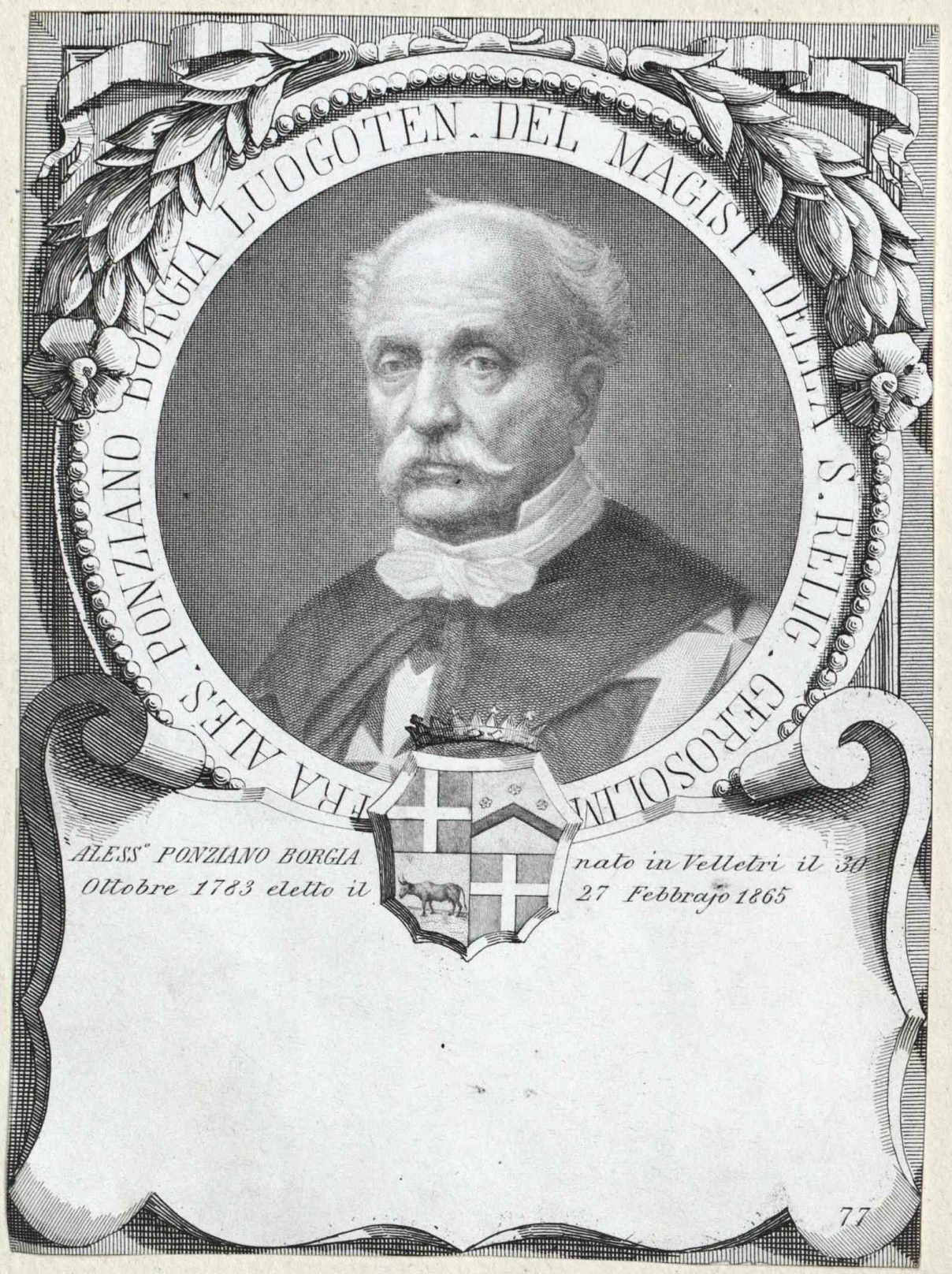

Lieutenant of the Grand Master of the Sovereign Military Order of Malta
- In office February 27, 1865 – January 13, 1872
- Preceded by: Filippo di Colloredo-Mels
- Succeeded by: Giovanni Battista Ceschi a Santa Croce

Personal details
- Born: October 30, 1783 Velletri
- Died: January 13, 1872 (aged 88) Rome

Fra' Alessandro Ponziano Borgia (October 30, 1783, Velletri, Papal States – January 13, 1872, Rome) was the leader of the Sovereign Military Order of Malta as Lieutenant of the Grand Master from 1865 to 1872.

Borgia was a younger son of Cavaliere Giampaolo Borgia, a member of a branch of the Borgia family from the city of Velletri who were distantly related to Pope Alexander VI. His mother was Countess Alcmena Baglioni-Malatesta, descended from the Baglioni family which formerly ruled the city of Perugia. His father's younger brother was Cardinal Stefano Borgia. His older brother Cesare was also a member of the Sovereign Military Order of Malta. His nephew Ettore Borgia was an Italian politician.

Borgia became a member of the Sovereign Military Order of Malta as a minor on February 18, 1787. He made his solemn profession as a Knight of Justice in 1802. In 1818 he took up residence at the Order's headquarters (called the "Convent") in Catania where he served as Procurator of the Langue of Italy. In 1824 he and the Order's other senior knights moved to Ferrara where he served as a member of the council. In 1834 he was responsible for the transfer of the Order's archives and other property from Ferrara to Rome. Under the Lieutenant Carlo Candida he was promoted to the rank of Venerable Bailiff Knight Grand Cross.

A day after the death of the Lieutenant of the Grand Master Fra' Filippo di Colloredo-Mels on October 9, 1864, Borgia received a letter from the Cardinal Secretary of State Giacomo Antonelli authorizing him to act as Lieutenant ad interim. He was elected Lieutenant of the Grand Master on February 27, 1865. His election was confirmed by Pope Pius IX in an apostolic letter of March 10, 1865.

Borgia died at the Palazzo Malta in Rome in 1872. He was succeeded as Lieutenant of the Grand Master by Fra' Giovanni Battista Ceschi a Santa Croce.
