= Ludovico Chigi Albani della Rovere =

- Prince and Grand Master of the Order of Malta

Prince and Grand Master of the Sovereign Military Order of Malta
- Reign: 30 May 1931 – 14 November 1951
- Predecessor: Fra' Galeas von Thun und Hohenstein, 75th Prince and Grand Master
- Successor: Fra' Angelo de Mojana, 77th Prince and Grand Master

Prince Chigi della Rovere-Albani
- Reign: 4 November 1914 – 10 June 1929
- Predecessor: Mario, 7th Prince Chigi della Rovere-Albani
- Successor: Sigismondo, 9th Prince Chigi della Rovere-Albani
- Born: 10 July 1866; Ariccia, Kingdom of Italy
- Died: 14 November 1951 (aged 85); Rome, Lazio, Italy
- Spouse: Donna Anna Aldobrandini (m. 1893; died 1898)
- Issue: Sigismondo, 9th Prince Chigi della Rovere-Albani; Princess Laura Maria Caterina Chigi della Rovere
Names
- Ludovico Chigi della Rovere-Albani
- House: House of Chigi della Rovere-Albani; Sovereign Military Hospitaller Order of St. John of Jerusalem, of Rhodes and of Malta (SMOM)
- Father: Prince Mario Chigi della Rovere-Albani
- Mother: Princess Antoinette zu Sayn-Wittgenstein-Sayn

Ludovico Chigi della Rovere-Albani (10 July 1866 – 14 November 1951) was Prince and Grand Master of the Sovereign Military Order of Malta from 1931 to 1951.

== Biography ==
=== Background ===
Chigi was born in Ariccia, the son of Imperial Prince Mario Chigi Albani della Rovere, VII principe di Farnese and Princess Antoinette zu Sayn-Wittgenstein-Sayn. The House of Chigi, his father's family, was among the oldest and most prominent noble families of Rome, to which had belonged Pope Alexander VII (1599–1667), who conferred upon his nephew Agostino Chigi (1634–1705) the hereditary princedoms of Farnese (1658) and Campagnano (1661), as well as the dukedoms of Arricia and Formello (1662), also procuring for all descendants of the Chigi male line the title of Imperial prince and princess from the Holy Roman Emperor Leopold I in 1659. In 1509 Pope Julius II had authorised the Chigi family to augment their name and arms with his own, della Rovere, and would become Ludovico's ancestor (in the 13th degree) through six lines of descent from that pope's illegitimate daughter, Felice della Rovere.

On 4 November 1914, Chigi's father died and he succeeded as 8th Prince di Farnese and di Campagnano, 4th Prince di Soriano, 8th Duke di Ariccia and di Formello, Marchese di Magliano Pecorareccio, Hereditary Marshall of the Holy Roman Church and Guardian of the Conclave. Chigi was responsible for three papal conclaves. He was an honorary member of the Pontifical Academy of Sciences.

=== Order of Malta ===
On 30 May 1931, Chigi was elected Grand Master of the Sovereign Military Order of Malta, Both of Chigi's parents had been members of the Order: his father was a Bailiff Knight Grand Cross of Devotion (since 21 June 1879) and his mother was a Dame decorated with the Cross of Devotion (since 10 June 1876).

Under Chigi's leadership the order engaged in large-scale hospitaller and charitable activities during World War II. In 1947, he was appointed president of an international committee to oversee the rebuilding of the Abbey of Monte Cassino.

Chigi died in Rome of a heart attack at the age of 85.

After Chigi's death, the Order spiralled into difficulties and Pope Pius XII forbade the immediate election of a new Grand Master which would have been usual. The Order was governed by a Lieutenant appointed by Rome (first Antonio Hercolani Fava Simonetti and then Ernesto Paternò Castello di Carcaci) and a Commission of Cardinals until the Constitutional Charter was approved by Apostolic Letter of Pope John XXIII in 1961 and Angelo de Mojana di Cologna was elected as new Grand Master. Cardinal Nicola Canali had attempted to become Grand Master after the death of Chigi in 1951 and a great controversy erupted about the status of the order as a religious and sovereign one. In addition to this, there was the controversy of Yves Marsaudon (a Freemason in Paris who had become a prominent member of the Order of Malta during the time of Chigi as Plenipotentiary to France and promoted ecumenism).

== Marriage and offspring ==
On 5 June 1893, in Rome, Chigi married Donna Anna Aldobrandini, daughter of Pietro, Prince Aldobrandini, Prince di Sarsina, and of his wife, Françoise de La Rochefoucauld. They had two children:

- Prince Sigismondo, 9th Prince Chigi della Rovere-Albani, (12 December 1894 – 24 December 1982), to whom his father ceded the princedom of Campagnano by an Italian writ of acceleration issued 10 June 1929. Married Marian Berry (9 September 1901), daughter of Jakob Berry and Aileen Freeman on 16 July 1926.
- Princess Laura Maria Caterina Chigi della Rovere (30 April 1898 – 4 November 1984) married Denis, Count Grisi della Piè. They have children.

Chigi's wife died on 17 September 1898.

== Footnotes ==
Catholic Church titles
Preceded by Galeazzo von Thun und Hohenstein	Grand Master of the Sovereign Military Order of Malta; 1931 - 1951	Succeeded by Angelo de Mojana di Cologna
