= Antonio Busca =

Antonio Busca may refer to:

- Antonio Busca (painter) (1625–1686), Italian painter
- Antonio Busca (lieutenant) (1767–1834), Italian nobleman, descendant of the above
