= Giovanni Battista Ceschi a Santa Croce =

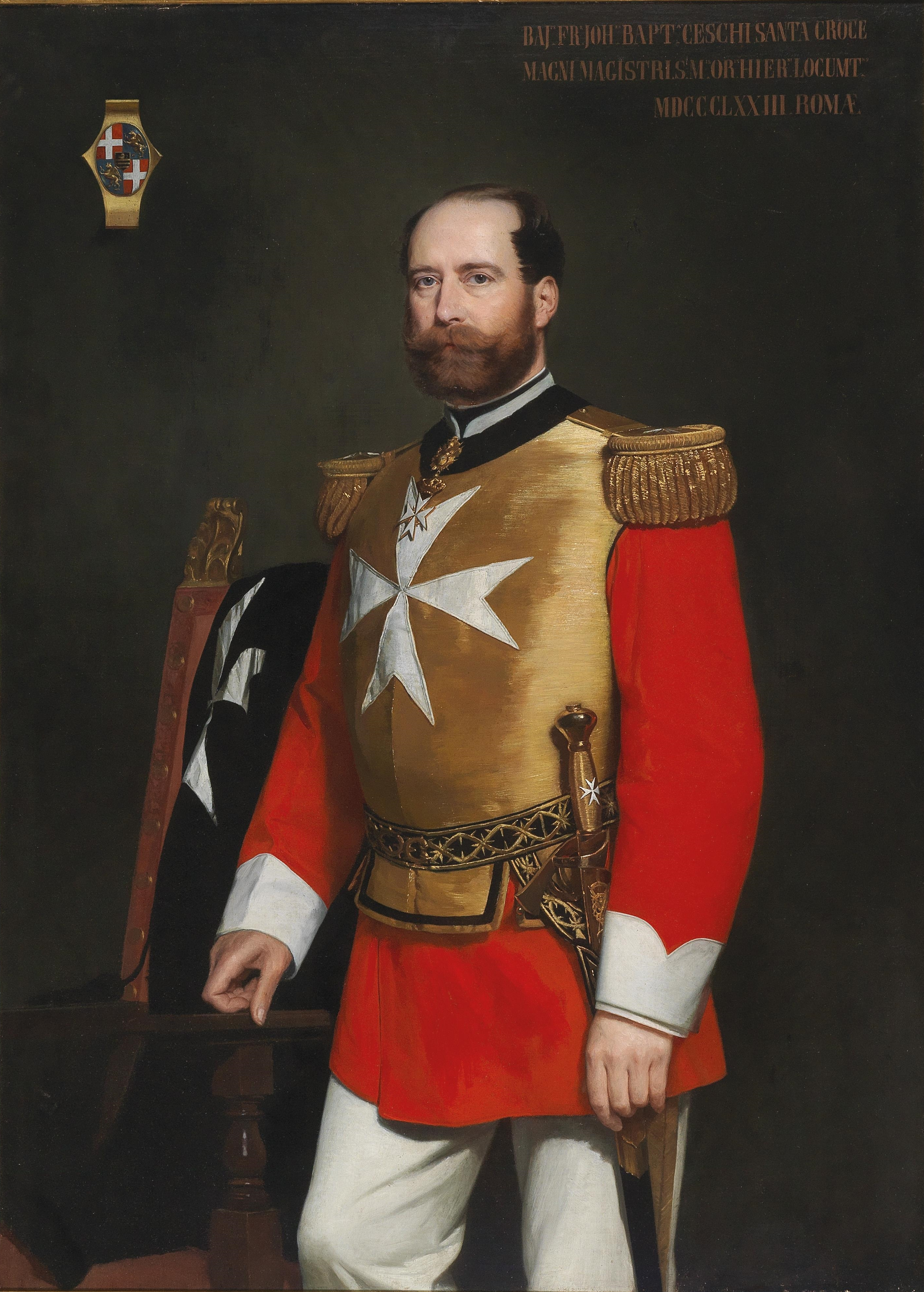
- Portrait of Ceschi a Santa Croce, by Franz Xaver Winterhalter

Prince and Grand Master of the Sovereign Military Order of Malta
- Reign: 28 March 1879 – 24 January 1905
- Predecessor: Himself (as Lieutenant of the Grand Master)
- Successor: Galeas von Thun und Hohenstein

Lieutenant of the Grand Master of the Sovereign Military Order of Malta
- Reign: 14 February 1872 – 28 March 1879
- Predecessor: Alessandro Borgia (1783–1871)
- Successor: Himself (as Grand Master)
- Born: 24 February 1827; Venice, Austrian Empire
- Died: 24 January 1905 (aged 77); Rome, Kingdom of Italy

Fra' Giovanni Battista Ceschi a Santa Croce (22 February 1827 – 24 January 1905) was an Italian Lieutenant of the Sovereign Military Order of Malta from 1872 to 1879 and then Prince and Grand Master from 1879 until his death in 1905.

== Early life ==
Ceschi was born on 22 February 1827 in Venice. He was the second son of Antonio Giuseppe Ceschi a Santa Croce (1777–1854) and Francesca Margarita a de Rosmini (1804–1875). His family worked in the government service of the Austrian Empire. In 1895 his older brother Alois, an imperial privy councillor and chamberlain and a life member of the Austrian House of Lords was made a count.

== Career ==
Ceschi joined the Order of Malta as a Knight of Justice 21 February 1856. In February 1868 he resigned from the Austrian government service. On 19 January 1871 he received the Commandery of Fiorucci di Pietralunga in Umbria. This commandery had formerly been held by Fra' Giovanni Battista Tommasi before he became Grand Master.

On 14 February 1872, Ceschi was elected Lieutenant of the Order in succession to Fra' Alessandro Borgia. On 28 March 1879, Pope Leo XIII appointed him Grand Master of the Order. He was the Order's first Grand Master in over seventy years.

Ceschi was responsible for restoring the good name of the Order by re-establishing its many works. He completed the organization of the Order's Hospice at Tantur near Jerusalem. He cooperated in the maintenance of the Order's hospital in Naples, the children's hospital in Milan, and the free dispensary for the poor in Paris. He organized the Association of the Italian Knights which provided medical service including hospital trains and barracks, thus receiving the support of the Italian government and royal family. He initiated the creation of national associations of the Order in Spain, Great Britain, France, and Portugal made up of knights who would remain lay people and not take religious vows.

== Personal life ==
Ceschi, who restored the Villa del Priorato di Malta, died in Rome on 24 January 1905.

Catholic Church titles
Preceded by Alessandro Borgia (1783–1871)	Lieutenant of the Grand Master of the Sovereign Military Order of Malta; 1871–1879	Succeeded by Himself (as Grand Master)
Preceded by Himself (as Lieutenant of the Grand Master)	Grand Master of the Sovereign Military Order of Malta; 1879–1905	Succeeded by Galeas von Thun und Hohenstein
