= Suardo =

Suardo is a surname. Notable people with the surname include:

- Giacomo Suardo (1883–1947), Italian lawyer
- Innico Maria Guevara-Suardo (1744–1814), Italian catholic religious
