= Nikolai Saltykov =

Russian aristocrat and Field Marshal

His Serene Highness Prince Nikolay Ivanovich Saltykov

Lieutenant Grand Master of the Order of Saint John
- In office 23 March 1801 – 1803
- Preceded by: Paul I of Russia
- Succeeded by: Giovanni Battista Tommasi

Personal details
- Born: 31 October 1736
- Died: 28 May 1816 (aged 79)
- Awards: Order of the White Eagle

Military service
- Allegiance: (Russia) Russian Empire (Sovereign Military Order of Malta) Order of Saint John
- Battles/wars: Seven Years' War; Russo-Turkish War (1768–1774); Siege of Giurgiu (1771)

Count, then Prince Nikolay Ivanovich Saltykov (Russian: Николай Иванович Салтыков, 31 October 1736 – 28 May 1816), a member of the Saltykov noble family, was a Russian Imperial Field Marshal and courtier best known as the tutor of the eventual Tsar Paul I of Russia and his two sons, Constantine and Alexander.

He was the head of the Russian Army as the president of the War Collegium in 1791–1802. He was also the interim head (Lieutenant Grand Master) of the Order of Malta between 1801 and 1803.

== Life ==
His parents were general Ivan Alexeyevich Saltykov (himself the nephew of Anna I of Russia) and countess Anastasia Petrovna Tolstoy. He spent a short time in the Semyonovsky Regiment, of which he became a permanent member in 1748. In 1747, he and his father took part in the Russian advance to the River Rhine. During the Seven Years' War he distinguished himself in several battles against Prussian forces. After the victory at Kunersdorf over Frederick II of Prussia, Nikolay was sent to Saint Petersburg to deliver news of the victory to the commander in chief - for that service, he was made a colonel.

In 1761, under the command of Pyotr Rumyantsev, he fought at Kolberg. Peter III of Russia made Saltykov a major general and in 1763 he was given command of the troops stationed in Poland, where he took part in the Russo-Turkish War (1768–1774). In 1769 he aided Prince Alexander Golitsyn in the siege and occupation of the city of Chotyn, which Russian troops entered on 10 September that year. For fighting with distinction in these battles he was made a lieutenant-general and a member of the Order of Alexander Nevsky, but due to ill health he was forced to leave the campaign in order to travel abroad in search of a cure. During this time, he spent three years visiting Europe, most notably visiting Berlin and Paris. After he returned to Russia, Catherine II of Russia made him vice-president of Russia's Military Council. Simultaneously, Catherine made him hofmeister of the court. He became tutor to Grand Duke Paul, with whom he again visited Berlin in 1776 before accompanying Paul on a grand tour across Europe in 1781 and 1782.

On 24 November 1782, Catherine made Saltykov a member of the Order of Saint Andrew, a senator and a member of the high court council. In the following years Catherine made Saltykov permanent tutor to her grandsons Alexander (the future Alexander I of Russia) and Konstantin. In June 1789, Saltykov introduced Catherine to the young Platon Zubov, in an effort to supplant Catherine's favourite (and Saltykov's rival) Prince Potemkin. Zubov would become the last of Catherine's favourites, accumulating an enormous fortune, despite becoming widely reviled for corruption and cruelty.

In 1790, during the celebrations of the peace with Sweden, Saltykov was made a Count of the Russian Empire, and granted 5,000 serfs in Russian Poland and an annual pension of 125 rubles. On Paul's accession to the throne, Saltykov was made field marshal general on 8 November 1796 and then president of the Military Council of State. Alexander I, during the celebrations of his coronation, gave Saltykov his portrait decorated with diamonds.

At the start of the Napoleonic Wars, Saltykov was instructed to look after military reports and to be head of state while Alexander was away leading the Russian army in 1813 and 1814. On Alexander's return to Saint Petersburg, Saltykov was promoted to Prince of the Russian Empire, with the title of Excellency. He was also made Lieutenant Grand Master of the Order of Malta from 1801 to 1803 on behalf of Alexander, who had been elected Grand Master but could not carry out his official duties.

Prince Saltykov and his family occupied a large Neoclassical townhouse at the crossing of the Millionnaya Street and the Palace Embankment in St Petersburg. His grandson Alexei Saltykov was known for his travels in India and Persia.

Preceded by Paul I of Russia de facto	Grand Master of the Knights Hospitaller; 1801–1803; Lieutenant de facto	Succeeded by Giovanni Battista Tommasi
Preceded by Nikolay Petrovich Rumyantsev	Chairman of the Committee of Ministers; 1812–1816	Succeeded by Pyotr Vasilyevich Lopukhin
