= Galeas von Thun und Hohenstein =

Maltese knight

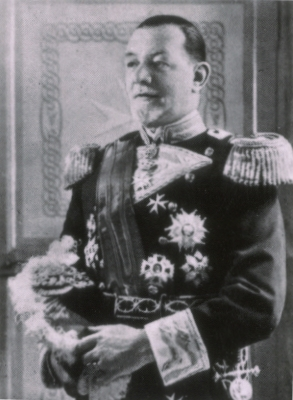

Prince and Grand Master of the Sovereign Military Order of Malta
- In office 6 March 1905 – 26 March 1931
- Preceded by: Giovanni Battista Ceschi a Santa Croce
- Succeeded by: Ludovico Chigi Albani della Rovere

Personal details
- Born: 24 September 1850 Trento
- Died: 26 March 1931 (aged 80) Rome

Fra' Galeas von Thun und Hohenstein (24 September 1850 – 26 March 1931) was the Prince and Grand Master of the Sovereign Military Order of Malta from 1905 to 1931. His first name was also known as Galeazzo.

== Biography ==
He was born in Trento (then in Austria, now in Italy), the youngest son of Count Guidobald Maria Thun und Hohenstein and of his wife, Teresa Guidi dei Marchesi di Bagno.

He studied law at the University of Innsbruck from 1869 to 1870 and at the University of Prague from 1870 to 1871, before returning to the University of Innsbruck from 1871 to 1873. Then he worked for thirteen years for the Austrian government in Trieste.

On 8 June 1875 Thun und Hohenstein was admitted to the Sovereign Military Order of Malta as a Knight of Justice. In 1885 he became the representative of the Grand Priory of Bohemia and Austria at the Order's headquarters in Rome; it was at this time that he gave up his position in the Austrian civil service. In 1886 he took solemn vows as a Knight of Justice.

In 1905 Thun und Hohenstein was elected Grand Master of the Sovereign Military Order of Malta. Under his leadership the order engaged in large-scale hospitaller and charitable activities during World War I. Since he had been born an Austrian subject, Thun und Hohenstein spent much of the war in Austria. He invested a large amount of the order's funds in Austrian war bonds, which became worthless when Austria was defeated.

For the last two years of his life, Thun und Hohenstein was physically incapacitated. He continued to be Grand Master, but a Lieutenant, Fra' Pio Franchi de' Cavalieri, acted on his behalf.

Thun und Hohenstein died in Rome.

== Honours ==
- Sovereign Military Order of Malta: Knight of Justice, 1886; Prince and Grand Master, 6 March 1905
- Kingdom of Bavaria: Knight of St. Hubert, 1907
- Austria-Hungary: Grand Cross of St. Stephen, 1909
- Spain:
  - Grand Cross of the Order of Charles III, 25 January 1908
  - Knight of the Golden Fleece, 13 July 1925
- Luxembourg: Knight of the Gold Lion of Nassau, 16 June 1930

== Notes ==
Catholic Church titles
Preceded by Giovanni Battista Ceschi a Santa Croce	Grand Master of the Sovereign Military Order of Malta; 1905–1931	Succeeded by Ludovico Chigi Albani della Rovere
