= Filippo di Colloredo-Mels =

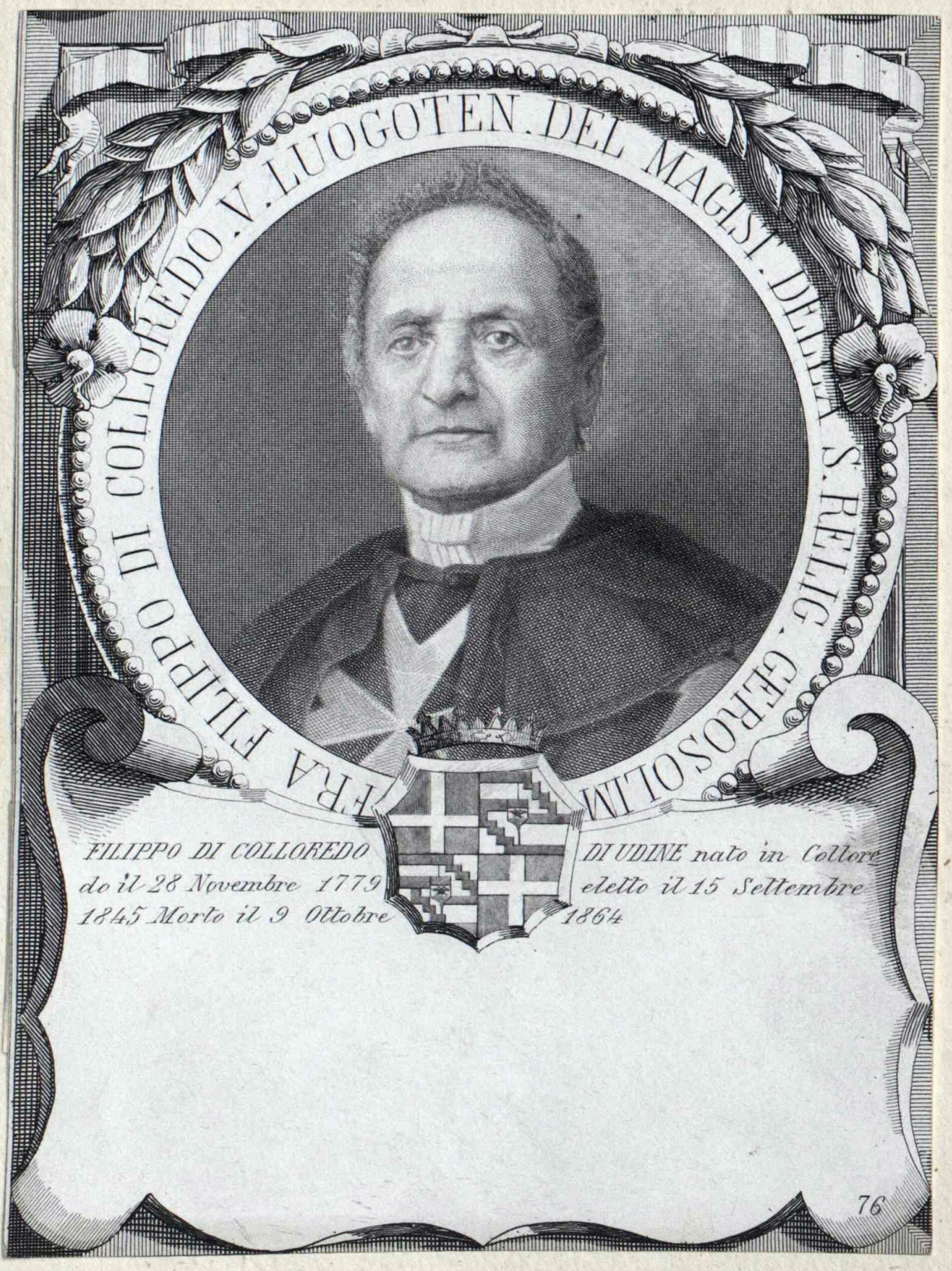

Lieutenant Grand Master of the Order of Saint John
- In office January 1845 – October 1864
- Preceded by: Carlo Candida
- Succeeded by: Alessandro Borgia

Personal details
- Born: 29 November 1779 Udine
- Died: 9 October 1864 (aged 84) Recanati

Filippo di Colloredo-Mels (29 November 1779 in Udine – 9 October 1864 in Recanati) was, from 1845 to 1864, the leader of the Sovereign Military Order of Malta.

From the Friulian noble family of the counts of Colloredo-Mels (a collateral branch of the Princely House of Colloredo-Mansfeld), his decision to join the Order was a sudden one – he was inscribed in it on 28 November 1779, when he was less than a year old. He made his adult profession to join it on 8 May 1840 and succeeded Carlo Candida as its lieutenant general in 1834, holding the post until his death, when he was succeeded by Alessandro Borgia.

== Sources ==
- (in Italian) Francesco Giuseppe Terrinoni Memorie storiche della resa di Malta ai francesi nel 1798, tip. delle Belle Arti, Roma, 1867.
