= Andrea Di Giovanni y Centellés =

Lieutenant Grand Master of the Order of Saint John
- In office 25 April 1814 – 10 June 1821
- Preceded by: Innico Maria Guevara-Suardo
- Succeeded by: Antonio Busca

Personal details
- Born: 3 February 1742 Messina, Kingdom of Sicily
- Died: 10 June 1821 (aged 79) Catania, Kingdom of the Two Sicilies

Andrea Di Giovanni y Centellés (Messina, 3 February 1742 – Catania, 10 June 1821) was an Italian nobleman and lieutenant of the Order of Saint John from 1814 until his death.

== Life ==
From a Spanish-origin noble family in Messina, Centellés officially entered the Order on 10 February 1750. Like his predecessor as lieutenant, Innico Maria Guevara-Suardo, his lieutenancy was marked by the problem of the sovereignty of Malta – on 30 May 1814 the Treaty of Paris between Russia, Britain, France and Prussia gave sovereignty over Malta to the British. Centellés immediately responded by sending delegates to the 1815 Congress of Vienna, where they presented the Order's reasons for claiming territorial possession over Malta but were unable to win over the delegates. He sent ambassadors again in 1818, to the signing of the Treaty of Aix-la-Chapelle, but once more to no avail. On his death in 1821 Antonio Busca succeeded him as lieutenant of the Order.

== Sources ==
- (in Italian) Francesco Giuseppe Terrinoni Memorie storiche della resa di Malta ai francesi nel 1798, tip. delle Belle Arti, Roma, 1867.
