= Carlo Candida =

Lieutenant of the Sovereign Order of Malta (1762–1845)

Lieutenant Grand Master of the Sovereign Military Order of Malta
- In office May 1834 – January 1845
- Preceded by: Antonio Busca
- Succeeded by: Filippo di Colloredo-Mels

Personal details
- Born: 7 October 1762 Lucera
- Died: January 1845 (aged 82) Rome

Carlo Candida (Lucera, 7 October 1762 – Rome, January 1845) was a lieutenant of the Sovereign Order of Malta from 1834 to his death, succeeding Antonio Busca.

== Life ==
Carlo Candida was from a noble family of Neapolitan origin. Before his election as lieutenant he was admiral of the Order's naval fleet then territorial commander of the Order's lands in Rome, Barletta and Capua, which had at that time been confiscated from the Order. During his time as lieutenant he succeeded in getting them returned to the Order and also implemented the move of the Order's base from Ferrara to Rome, completed on 2 June 1834, putting the Order under direct papal protection at the heart of Christendom. In Rome Candida began setting up a hospital in 1841 in the outbuildings of the church of San Francesco at Ponte Sisto, run by papal officials who were also knights of the Order, though this was not long-lasting and closed after a fire in 1844.

Under Candida's leadership, the Order finally rose from its 1798 fall and was even able to get help from the other European powers then in control of Italy - by a sovereign order of 15 January 1839, Ferdinand I of Austria re-established the Grand Priory of Lombardy and Venice, basing it in a palazzo in Venice next to the civic church of Saint John the Baptist, patron of the Order. Simultaneously Ferdinand I of the Two Sicilies re-established the Baliaggio di Napoli and the duchies of Modena, Lucca and Parma reintroduced the Order's commanderies into their territories. The Order also established itself in the Kingdom of Piedmont-Sardinia in 1844, under the protection of king Carlo Alberto. On his death in Rome in 1845 Candida was buried in the church of San Francesco and succeeded as lieutenant by Filippo di Colloredo-Mels.

== Sources ==
- (in Italian) Francesco Giuseppe Terrinoni Memorie storiche della resa di Malta ai francesi nel 1798, tip. delle Belle Arti, Roma, 1867.
