= Antonio Hercolani Fava Simonetti =

Count Antonio Hercolani Fava Simonetti (22 January 1883 – 18 June 1962), born Antonio Hercolani, was a member of the Sovereign Military Order of Malta.

Born into a noble family from Bologna, he never took the Order's vows but held several diplomatic and institutional posts within it. On 15 June 1912, in Bologna, he married Marianna Ghislieri Fava Simonetti, daughter of count Alessandro Fava Ghislieri and lady Isotta Simonetti of the principality of Musone. Thanks to this marriage Antonio Hercolani was allowed to add Fava Simonetti to his surname on 29 August 1921. They had one son, Filippo Rinaldo (1913–2002), who also had issue.

On the death of Ludovico Chigi Albani della Rovere in 1951, Simonetti temporarily held the post of lieutenant general of the order until the election of della Rovere's successor as grand master, but that election was long-delayed and so in 1955 Hercolani retired and Ernesto Paternò Castello di Carcaci was elected to replace him as lieutenant general.
