= Innico Maria Guevara-Suardo =

Innico Maria Guevara Suardo
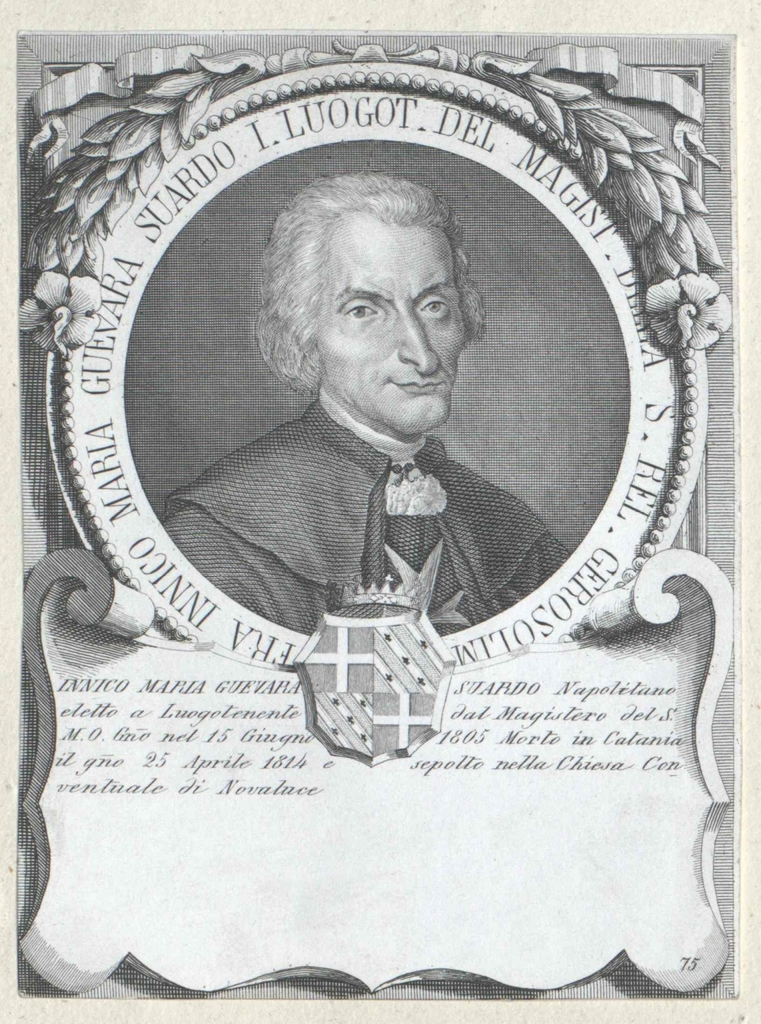

Lieutenant Grand Master of the Order of Saint John
- In office 13 June 1805 – 25 April 1814
- Preceded by: Giovanni Battista Tommasi
- Succeeded by: Andrea Di Giovanni y Centellés

Personal details
- Born: 4 June 1744 Naples, Kingdom of Naples
- Died: 25 April 1814 (aged 69) Catania, Kingdom of Sicily

Innico Maria Guevara Suardo (4 June 1744 in Naples – 25 April 1814 in Catania) was a member and leader of the Order of Saint John (also known as the Sovereign Military Order of Malta).

== Life ==
Born into a Neapolitan noble family of Spanish origin, he was made lieutenant of the Order on the death of Grand Master Giovanni Battista Tommasi in 1805, since the Order had been expelled from its traditional base on Malta and was now based in Catania. Guevara Suardo distinguished himself as an admiral of the Order's naval fleet, using all his authority and firmness to prevent the Order's lands in Sicily being sold, as was planned during the reign of Joachim Murat, the new king of Naples.

On 23 June 1811 he also had to accept the suppression of the Order of Saint John of the Bailiwick of Brandenburg, operated by Frederick William III of Prussia, who founded a new order with a view to nominating the new Grand Master, so as to completely remove the ancient Brandenburg institution from the Catholic Order of Malta. During his lieutenancy he also unsuccessfully attempted to get the British government to return control of Malta to the Order, which they were unwilling to do even after the end of the Napoleonic Wars. With a political and diplomatic commitment, in the same years in which the Order was attempting to reacquire control over Malta, Gustav IV Adolf of Sweden offered to transfer the Order's base to the island of Gotland, so as to have the prestigious order based on Swedish soil. Guevara-Suardo was grateful for the offer but refused it as soon as it was made, since accepting it would insinuate that the Order was giving up its claims on Malta. On his death in 1814 Guevara Suardo was buried in the convent church of Novaluce and succeeded as lieutenant by Andrea Di Giovanni y Centellés.

== Sources ==
- (in Italian) Francesco Giuseppe Terrinoni, Memorie storiche della resa di Malta ai francesi nel 1798, tip. delle Belle Arti, Roma, 1867.
