= Giovanni Battista Tommasi =

Italian nobleman and prince

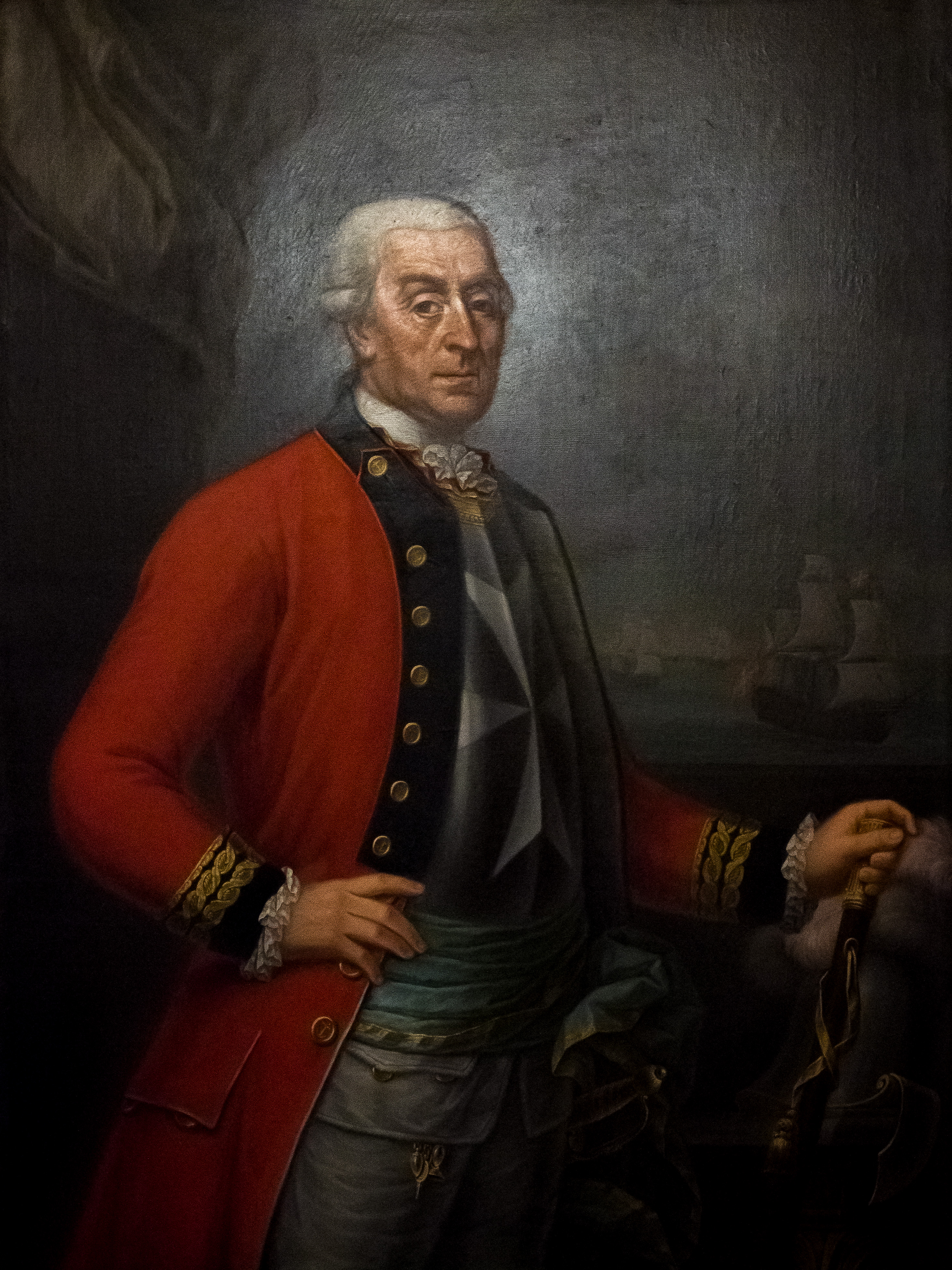

Grand Master of the Order of Saint John
- In office 11 March 1803 – 13 June 1805
- Preceded by: Nikolay Saltykov
- Succeeded by: Innico Maria Guevara-Suardo

Personal details
- Born: 6 October 1731 Cortona, Kingdom of Naples
- Died: June 13, 1805 (aged 73) Catania, Kingdom of Sicily
- Resting place: Catania

Military service
- Allegiance: (Sovereign Military Order of Malta) Order of Saint John

Frà Giovanni Battista Tommasi (Cortona, 6 October 1731 – Catania, 13 June 1805) was an Italian nobleman and 73rd Prince and Grand Master of the Order of Malta.

== Life ==
=== 1731–1798 ===
He was born in the Kingdom of Naples and entered the Knights Hospitaller whilst still young, being sent to Malta aged 12 as a page of honour to Grand Master Emmanuel Pinto. At the end of his time as a page, he was attached to the 'caravans on the sea', in which he was recognised as one of the Order's best sailors. He was later made commander in chief of the Order's navy. He was also a freemason, being the founder member of a lodge with seven other knights of the Order of Malta (two of those seven were later made Grand Cross of the Order - the count of Litta, Grand Master Rohan's close friend Abel de Loras). Tommasi was decorated with Order's grand cross, entered its grand council and was entrusted with one important administrative role in the order after another. After bailli Mazei's death, in 1784, Leopold, Grand Duke of Tuscany made Tommasi minister to the Grand Master.

=== 1798–1803 ===
In 1798, however, Bonaparte captured Malta and grand master Ferdinand von Hompesch zu Bolheim abdicated. Tommasi and the other knights were forced to leave the island and were scattered across Europe. An important section of the order regrouped in Russia and chose Paul I of Russia as Grand Master, but the pope did not recognise this election since he felt that the order could not be led by a married Russian Orthodox man who had never belonged to the order. On Paul's death, his son Alexander I of Russia decided to end this irregular situation and refused to be Grand Master. In the meantime the British had captured Malta and the Allied nations had agreed to re-establish the order, still dispersed across Europe and Russia and so unable to gather for a general assembly. The election of a new Grand Master was thus (for this instance only) deferred to the pope (then Pope Pius VII), with each priory presenting a candidate to him - Tommasi (then in exile in Messina) was one of these candidates.

In the meantime, in September 1802, Pius had offered the post to bailli Bartolomeo Ruspoli (born 1754), a Roman prince who had been general of the order's galleys for four years, but Ruspoli was then in Scotland and declined the post. A second consistory chose Tommasi as Grand Master on 9 February 1803, on the recommendation of Alexander I and Ferdinand IV & III, King of Naples and Sicily, and he was appointed on 11 March the same year.

=== 1803–1805 ===
Straight after his appointment Tommasi sent the commander de Bussy to Malta to demand the British evacuate the island in line with article 10 of the treaty of Amiens and hand over the government palace in the fort at Valletta. The British governor Alexander Ball replied on 2 March 1803 that some powers were still not recognising Malta's independence and so Britain was authorised to continue basing troops on the island and that the government palace (occupied by British civil servants) could not be vacated. Ball recognised that the Grand Master would be able to base himself at the Boschetta palace but that until this palace was furnished Tommasi should provisionally base himself on Sicily. In response Tommasi convoked a general assembly of the order in the order's church at Messina on 27 June 1803.

After reading the assembly the papal bull regarding his own election as Grand Master, Tommasi requested that the Order show unity in order to guarantee its continued existence and its historic statutes. He then set up residence in Catania on Sicily, where he gathered the Order's chancellery and archives. The Augustinian convent was put at their disposal while Tommasi himself lived in a neighbouring palace, where he died on 13 June 1805 aged 74, after having named bailli Innico Maria Guevara-Suardo lieutenant of the order in his place. He was buried at Catania Cathedral and also commemorated at Cortona Cathedral, with the latter holding a cenotaph in his memory (several of his possessions are in the museum in Cortona). Suardo's nomination was confirmed by the pope and the Order's holy council and he held it from then until his death on 15 April 1814. The Order was then governed by further lieutenants until a regular election could be approved by the pope in 1879.

Preceded by Paul I of Russia (de facto) / Count Nikolay Saltykov (lieutenant de facto)	Grand Master of the Knights Hospitaller; 1803–1805	Succeeded by Innico Maria Guevara-Suardo (lieutenant general)
