= Antonio Busca (lieutenant) =

Lieutenant of the Sovereign Military Order of Malta
- In office June 1821 – May 1834
- Preceded by: Andrea Di Giovanni y Centellés
- Succeeded by: Carlo Candida

Personal details
- Born: 17 February 1767 Milan, Duchy of Milan
- Died: 19 May 1834 (aged 67) Milan, Kingdom of Lombardy–Venetia

Antonio Busca (17 February 1767 in Milan – 19 May 1834 in Milan) was an Italian nobleman and Lieutenant of the Sovereign Military Order of Malta from 1821 to 1834.

== Life ==
Descended from the painter Antonio Busca, he belonged to a noble Milanese family. He officially entered the Order of Malta on 11 March 1779.

On 11 June 1820 Busca was unanimously elected Lieutenant of the Order by its Council; before the election three members of the Council had left because of their opposition to Busca's nomination. The Lieutenant was the head of the Order in the absence of a Grand Master (who would not be elected until 1879). In June 1821 Busca visited the Order's headquarters, the Convent, in Catania, Sicily. He was sworn in as Lieutenant and remained there two months before returning to Milan.

Like Andrea Di Giovanni y Centellés, his predecessor as Lieutenant, Busca unsuccessfully attempted to have the island of Malta returned to the Order's control. In 1822 he organised a volunteer contingent of knights from the Order to assist against the Ottoman Empire in the Greek War of Independence, reviving the Order's crusader ideals. The Order's administration was then based in Catania, too far from the centres of European power and exposed to foreign incursions, so in 1826 Busca moved it to Ferrara, then within the Papal States. He was succeeded as Lieutenant on his death by Carlo Candida.

== Sources ==
- (in Italian) Francesco Giuseppe Terrinoni Memorie storiche della resa di Malta ai francesi nel 1798, tip. delle Belle Arti, Roma, 1867.
