= Ernesto Paternò Castello di Carcaci =

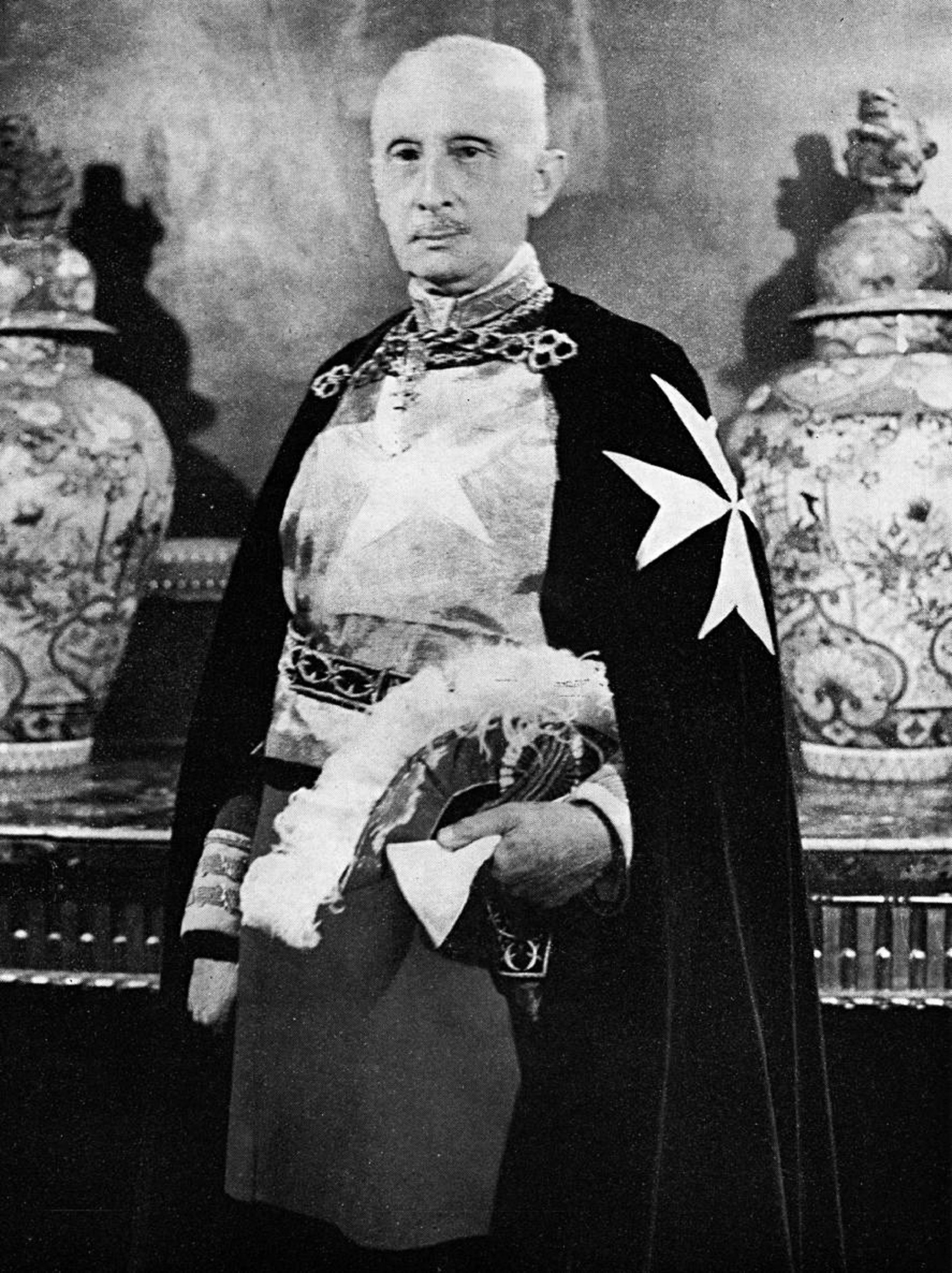
Ernesto Paternò Castello di Carcaci

Ernesto Paternò Castello di Carcaci (7 August 1882 – 9 April 1971) was Lieutenant of the Sovereign Military Order of Malta from 1955 to 1962 (succeeding Antonio Hercolani Fava Simonetti). In 1962 Paternò retired from the post on the election of Angelo de Mojana di Cologna as Grand Master.

== Biography ==
Don Ernesto Paternò Castello was born into the noble Sicilian family of Paternò, specifically the branch of the Dukes of Carcaci, which in turn descended from the Lords, Barons and Princes of Biscari. Ninth son of Don Francesco Maria Domenico, 9th Duke of Carcaci and 7th Baron of Placa and Bajana (1850-1912), and Donna Agata Artale, daughter of Filadelfo Marquis of Collalto, Baron of Colla Soprana and Sottana and Lord of Cannata. In 1914, he married Donna Maria Cantarella e Scammacca, with whom he had one daughter, Agata (1914-1958).

Widowed at a young age, he took his vows and became a Professed Knight of the Sovereign Military Order of Malta in 1935. He was awarded the title of Commendatore and Balì in 1952. Appointed representative in Sicily of the Grand Prior of Naples and Sicily and called to Rome to the Council of State, Fra Ernesto Paternò rose to the leadership of the Order as Lieutenant of the Grand Master on April 25, 1955, after the interim lieutenancy of Bailiff Fra Antonio Hercolani Fava Simonetti.
