= Boeselager =

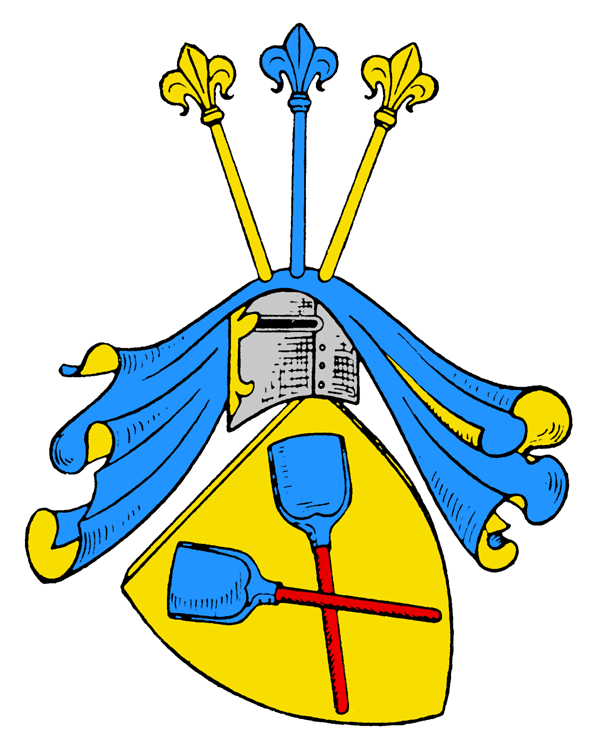
The coat of arms of the Boeselager family.

The Boeselager (or Böselager) family is an old German noble family that originated from Magdeburg.

== History ==
The members of this noble house whose line begins with one Squire Boeselager of Stemmern by Magdeburgon first appearing in the documents on April 12, 1363. The first fully documented member is Henning von Boeselager holding a knight's fief in Wolmirsleben from April 12, 1466. By decree of the Royal Prussian throne, members of the Heesen Line entered the ranks of the barons on December 20, 1823; the members of the Eggermühlen branch were thereafter styled "barons" according to customary law.

Notable members are active in the Order of Malta, amongst them Grand Chancellor, Albrecht von Boeselager and Csilla von Boeselager.

== Notable members ==
- Joachim von Boeselager (1608–1668), Diplomat
- Georg Freiherr von Boeselager (1915–1944), German officer, member of the 20 July Plot against Hitler
- Philipp Freiherr von Boeselager (1917–2008), German officer, member of the 20 July Plot against Hitler
- Csilla von Boeselager (1941–1994), founder of Hungarian Maltese Charity Organisation
- Albrecht von Boeselager (born 4 October 1949 in Burg Kreuzberg), Grand Chancellor of the Sovereign Military Order of Malta.
- Damian Freiherr von Boeselager (born 8 March 1988), an MEP for Volt Deutschland, the German chapter of Volt Europa, elected in 2019.
