= List of dignitaries at the funeral of Pope John Paul II =

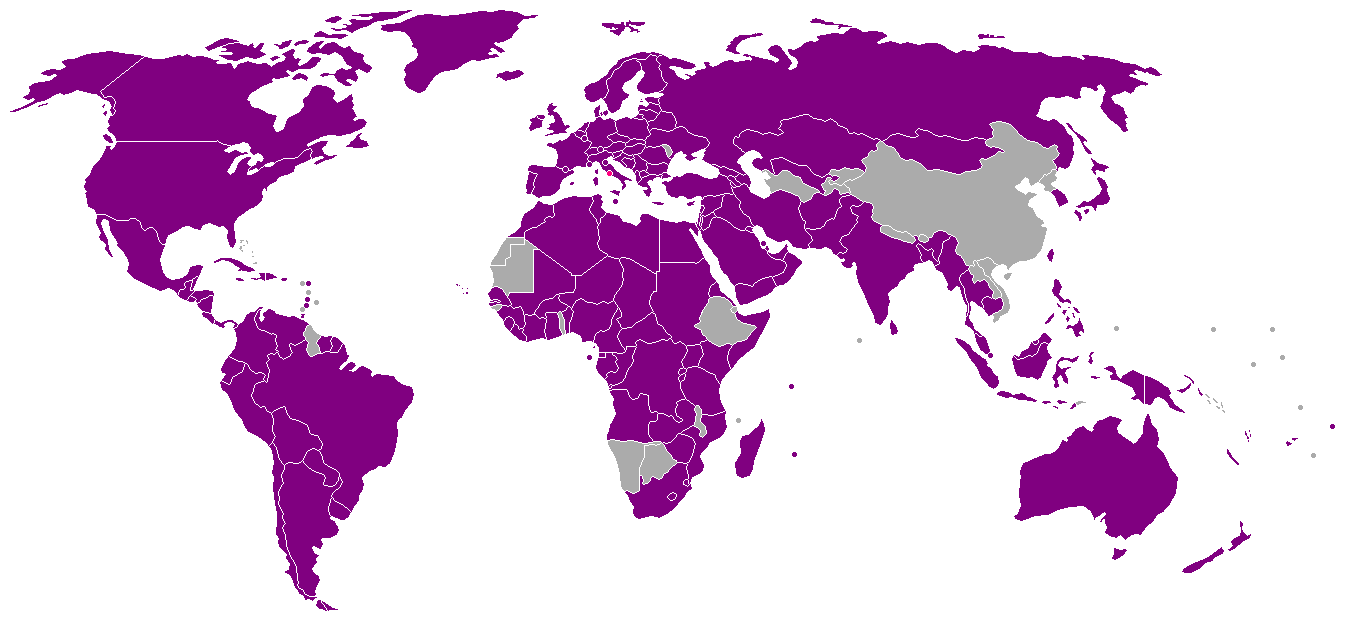
Map indicating countries that sent official dignitaries at the funeral of Pope John Paul II

After the death of Pope John Paul II on 2 April 2005, in Vatican City, and before official invitations were sent by the College of Cardinals, almost 200 countries expressed interest in sending representatives to his funeral. The funeral took place on 8 April 2005, and was one of the largest gatherings of statesmen and world leaders in history, with 10 sovereigns, 80 past and present elected heads of state, 75 heads of governments and numerous dignitaries from 18 multilateral organizations, 15 religions and 112 countries in attendance. Some of the dignitaries later attended the installation of Pope Benedict XVI on 24 April 2005.

At the funeral, the dignitaries were seated alphabetically according to the French spelling of their country's name and arranged according to diplomatic protocol. In order to accommodate all interested parties wishing to receive a seat during the Requiem Mass, the Holy See limited the number of members in each official diplomatic delegation to five people, except for the delegations from Italy and Poland, the latter of which, being John Paul II's homeland, was allowed ten people. The limit did not exclude other people of any nationality from attaining individual invitations, unrelated to their country's delegation: for example, the attendance of Fernando Henrique Cardoso, former president of Brazil, had no connection with the Brazilian delegation. In addition to a country's official delegation, any number of government officials were permitted to attend as pilgrim travellers, remaining outside the basilica during the Requiem Mass with the general public. For example, the United States delegation included the president and first lady, two former presidents, and the secretary of state, and they all had seats in the basilica during the Requiem Mass. Dozens of members of Congress attended the Requiem Mass, congregating among the general public outside the basilica.

== Members of official delegations ==
=== A ===
Country	Flag	Official delegation	Titles
Afghanistan		Hamid Karzai; Abdullah Abdullah; Zalmai Rassoul; Mostapha Zaher; Mohammad Nadir Hatami	President of the Republic; Minister of Foreign Affairs; National Security Advisor; Ambassador; First Secretary
Albania	Flag of Albania	Alfred Moisiu; Fatos Nano; Sali Berisha; Rexhep Meidani; Mirella Moisiu	President of the Republic; Prime Minister; Former President of the Republic; Former President of the Republic; Daughter of the President of the Republic
Algeria	Flag of Algeria	Abdelaziz Bouteflika; Bouabdalla Ghoulamallah; Mokhtar Reguieg	President of the Republic; Minister of Religious Affairs; Ambassador
Andorra	Flag of Andorre	Joan Enric Vives Sicília; Jacques Chirac; Marc Forné Molné; Maria Lluisa Gispert de Forné; Juli Minoves-Triquell; Josep Angel Mortès Pons	Co-Prince; Co-Prince; Head of Government; Consort of the Head of Government; Minister of Foreign Affairs; Vice-President of Parliament
Angola	Flag of Angola	José Eduardo dos Santos; Ana Paula dos Santos; João Bernardo de Miranda; Boaventura da Silva Cardoso; José Filipe	President of the Republic; First Lady; Minister of Foreign Affairs; Minister of Culture; Chief of Protocol of the Presidency
Antigua and Barbuda	Flag of Antigua and Barbuda	Carl Roberts	Ambassador
Argentina	Flag of Argentine	Daniel Scioli; Rafael Bielsa; Guillermo Rodolfo Oliveri	Vice-President of the Republic; Minister of Foreign Affairs, International Trade and Religious Affairs; Secretary of State for Religious Affairs
Armenia	Flag of Arménie	Andranik Markaryan; Edward Nalbandian; Rouben Shugarian; Armen Bayburtian; Gevorg Hakobian	Prime Minister; Ambassador to the Holy See; Ambassador; Vice-Minister of Foreign Affairs; First Assistant to the Prime Minister
Australia	Flag of Australie	Michael Jeffery; Marlena Jeffery; Maria Cicutto; Robert Hunter; Ted Knez	Governor-General of Australia; Wife of the Governor-General Embassy Counsellor
Austria	Flag of Austria	Heinz Fischer; Margit Fischer; Wolfgang Schüssel; Hubert Gorbach; Andreas Khol	Federal President; First Lady; Federal Chancellor; Vice-Chancellor; President of the Chamber of Deputies
Azerbaijan	Flag of Azerbaijan	Ilham Aliyev	President of the Republic

=== B ===
Country	Flag	Official delegation	Title
Bangladesh	Flag of Bangladesh	Chowdhury Kamal Ibne Yusuf	Food and Disaster Management Minister
Belarus	Flag of Belarus	Gennady Novitsky; Vladimir Korolev; Aleksei Skripko	President of the Council of the Republic of Belarus; Ambassador to the Vatican; Ambassador
Belgium	Flag of Belgium	King Albert II; Queen Paola; Guy Verhofstadt; Didier Reynders; Herman De Croo	King of the Belgians; Queen Consort; Prime Minister of Belgium; Deputy Prime Minister; President of the Lower House
Bolivia	Flag of Bolivia	Carlos Mesa; Elvira Salinas de Mesa; José Ignacio Siles	President of the Republic; First Lady; Ambassador
Bosnia and Herzegovina	Flag of Bosnia and Herzegovina	Borislav Paravac; Šefik Džaferović; Bariša Čolak	Chairman of the Presidency; President of Parliament; Deputy Prime Minister
Brazil	Flag of Brésil	Luiz Inácio Lula da Silva; Fernando Henrique Cardoso; Itamar Franco; José Sarney; Marisa Letícia da Silva; Renan Calheiros; Severino Cavalcanti; Nelson Jobim	President of the Republic; Former President; Former President; Former President; First Lady; President of the Senate; President of the Chamber of Deputies; President of the Supreme Federal Court
Bulgaria	Flag of Bulgaria	Georgi Parvanov	President of the Republic

=== C ===
Country	Flag	Official delegation	Title
Canada	Flag of Canada	Paul Martin; Sheila Martin; Stephen Harper; Phil Fontaine	Prime Minister of Canada; Wife of the Prime Minister; Leader of Her Majesty's Loyal Opposition; National Chief of the Assembly of First Nations
Chile	Flag of Chile	Ignacio Walker; Sergio Romero; José Antonio Viera Gallo; Gabriel Ascencio; Pablo Longueira	Minister of Foreign Affairs; President of the Senate; Socialist senator President of the Chamber of Deputies; UDI deputy
China	flag de Taïwan	Chen Shui-bian; Chen Tang-san	President; Minister of Foreign Affairs
Colombia	Flag of Colombia	Francisco Santos; María Victoria García	Vice President of Colombia; Second Lady of Colombia
Democratic Republic of the Congo	flag of the Democratic Republic of the Congo	Joseph Kabila; Jean-Pierre Bemba	President of the Republic; Vice-President of the Republic
Costa Rica	Flag of Costa Rica	Abel Pacheco; Roberto Tovar Faja	President of the Republic; Minister of Foreign Affairs
Croatia	Flag of Croatie	Stipe Mesić; Ivo Sanader	President of the Republic; Prime Minister
Cuba	flag de Cuba	Ricardo Alarcón; Caridad Diego; Raúl Roa Kourí	President of the National Assembly; Chief of Religious Affairs of the Communist Party of Cuba; Ambassador to the Holy See
Cyprus	Flag de Cypres	Tassos Papadopoulos; George Poulides; Tasos Tzionis	President of the Republic; Ambassador to the Holy See; Director of the Diplomatic Office of the President
Czech Republic	flag of the Republic tchèque	Václav Klaus; Cyril Svoboda	President of the Republic; Minister of Foreign Affairs

=== D ===
Country	Flag	Official delegation	Title
Denmark	Flag of Danemark	Queen Margrethe II; Prince Henrik; Anders Fogh Rasmussen	Queen of Denmark; Prince Consort; Prime Minister of Denmark
Dominican Republic		Margarita Cedeño de Fernández; Alejandrina Germán; Carlos Rafael Marión-Landais	First Lady; Secretary of Education; Ambassador to the Holy See

=== E ===
Country	Flag	Official delegation	Title
Ecuador	Flag of Équateur	Lucio Gutiérrez; Ximena Bohórquez; Patricio Zuquilanda	President of the Republic; First Lady; Minister of Foreign Affairs
Egypt	flag of Egypt	Farouk Hosni	Minister of Culture
El Salvador	Flag of Salvador	Francisco Laínez; Ana Ligia Mixco Sol de Saca; René Figueroa; Roberto Simán; María Eugenia Brizuela de Ávila	Minister of Foreign Affairs; First Lady; Minister of the Interior former Ambassador to the Holy See former Minister of Foreign Affairs
Equatorial Guinea	Flag of Equatorial Guinea	Teodoro Obiang Nguema Mbasogo	President of the Republic
Estonia	Flag of Estonia	Arnold Rüütel	President of the Republic

=== F ===
Country	Flag	Official delegation	Title
Fiji	Flag of Fiji	Ermital L. Boladuadua	Ambassador
Finland	Flag of Finland	Matti Vanhanen	Prime Minister of Finland
France	Flag of France	Jacques Chirac; Bernadette Chirac	President of the French Republic; Wife of the President of the French Republic

=== G ===
Country	Flag	Official delegation	Title
Germany	Flag of Allemagne	Horst Köhler; Wolfgang Thierse; Gerhard Schröder; Joschka Fischer; Dieter Althaus	President; President of the Bundestag; Chancellor; Minister of Foreign Affairs; Vice-President of the Bundesrat
Ghana	Flag of Ghana	John Kufuor	President of the Republic
Greece	Flag of Greece	Karolos Papoulias; Panagiotis Skandalakis; Konstantinos Georgiou	President of the Republic; Secretary of State for Foreign Affairs; General Secretary of the Presidency
Guatemala	Flag of Guatemala	Óscar Berger; Wendy de Berger; Jorge Briz Abularach; Rigoberta Menchú	President of the Republic; First Lady; Minister of Foreign Affairs; Nobel Peace Prize Laureate 1992
Guinea	Flag of Guinea	Sidibé Fatoumata Kaba	Minister of Foreign Affairs

=== H ===
Country	Flag	Official delegation	Title
Haiti	Flag of Haïti	Gérard Latortue	Prime Minister
Honduras	Flag of Honduras	Ricardo Maduro	President of the Republic
Hungary	Flag of Hungary	Ferenc Mádl; Dalma Mádl; Ferenc Gyurcsány; Viktor Orbán; Katalin Szili	President of the Republic; First Lady; Prime Minister; Former Prime Minister; President of Parliament

=== I ===
Country	Flag	Official delegation	Title
India	Flag of India	Bhairon Singh Shekhawat; Paty Ripple Kyndiah; Oscar Fernandes	Vice President of India; Minister of Tribal Issues and Minister Development of the North-East Region; Minister of Parliamentary Affairs
Indonesia	Flag of Indonesia	Alwi Shihab; Maftuh Basyuni; Freddy Numberi	Coordinating Minister for People's Welfare; Minister of Religious Affairs; Minister of Fisheries and Maritime Affairs, former Ambassador to Italy
Iran	Flag of Iran	Mohammad Khatami	President of Iran
Iraq	Flag of Iraq	Ayad Allawi	Prime Minister of Iraq
Ireland	Flag of Irlande	Mary McAleese; Bertie Ahern; Mary Harney	President of Ireland; Taoiseach (Prime Minister); Tánaiste (Deputy-Prime Minister)
Israel	Flag of Israël	Moshe Katsav; Silvan Shalom	President of Israel; Deputy Prime Minister and Minister of Foreign Affairs
Italy	Flag of Italie	Carlo Azeglio Ciampi; Franca Ciampi; Silvio Berlusconi; Gaetano Gifuni; Antonio Puri Purini; Gianfranco Mazzuoli; Marcello Pera; Pier Ferdinando Casini; Piero Alberto Capotosti; Gianfranco Fini	President of the Italian Republic; Wife of the President; Prime Minister of Italy; Counsellor of State, General Secretary of the Presidency; Diplomatic Counsellor to the Presidency; Counsellor Coordinator at the Presidency; President of the Senate; President of the Chamber of Deputies; President of the Constitutional Court; Minister of Foreign Affairs

=== J ===
Country	Flag	Official delegation	Title
Japan	flag of Japan	Yoriko Kawaguchi	Advisor to the Prime Minister
Jordan	Flag of Jordan	King Abdullah II; Queen Rania	King of Jordan; Queen of Jordan

=== K ===
Country	Flag	Official delegation	Title
Kenya	Flag of Kenya	Chirau Ali Mwakwere	Minister of foreign affairs
Kuwait		Jaber Al Abdullah Al Jaber Al Sabah	Member of the royal family

=== L ===
Country	Flag	Official delegation	Title
Latvia	Flag of Latvia	Vaira Vīķe-Freiberga	President of the Republic
Lebanon	Flag of Liban	Émile Lahoud; Omar Karami; Issam Fares; Nabih Berri	President of the Republic; Prime Minister; Deputy Prime Minister; Speaker of Parliament
Lesotho	Flag of Lesotho	King Letsie III; Monyane Moleleki	King of Lesotho; Minister of Foreign Affairs
Liechtenstein	Flag of Liechtenstein	Prince Hans-Adam II; Princess Marie; The Prince Nikolaus; Princess Margaretha	Sovereign Prince of Liechtenstein; Princess Consort; Ambassador to the Holy See wife of the ambassador to the Holy See
Lithuania	Flag of Lithuania	Valdas Adamkus	President of the Republic
Luxembourg	Flag of Luxembourg	Grand Duke Henri; Grand Duchess Maria Teresa; Jean-Claude Juncker	Grand Duke of Luxembourg; Grand Duchess of Luxembourg; Prime Minister of Luxembourg

=== M ===
Country	Flag	Official delegation	Title
Macedonia	Flag of Macédoine	Branko Crvenkovski	President
Madagascar	Flag of Madagascar	Marc Ravalomanana	President
Malaysia		Bernard Giluk Dompok Abdullah Md Zin Lily Zacharia	Minister in the Prime Minister's Department Minister in the Prime Minister's Department Ambassador to Italy
Malta	Flag of Malta	Eddie Fenech Adami; Mary Fenech Adami; Lawrence Gonzi; Kate Gonzi; Alfred Sant	President of Malta; First Lady of Malta; Prime Minister of Malta; Spouse of the Prime Minister; Leader of the Opposition
Mauritius	Flag of Mauritius	Paul Bérenger	Prime Minister
Mexico	Flag of Mexico	Vicente Fox; Marta Sahagún; Luis Ernesto Derbez	President of Mexico; First Lady of Mexico; Secretary of Foreign Affairs
Monaco	Flag of Monaco	Patrick Leclercq	Minister of State
Morocco	Flag of Morocco	Prince Moulay Rachid; Mohamed Benaissa; Mohamed Sbihi	Prince and brother of King Mohammed VI; Minister of Foreign Affairs; Ambassador

=== N ===
Country	Flag	Official delegation	Title
Netherlands	Flag of the Netherlands	Jan Peter Balkenende	Prime Minister of the Netherlands
New Zealand	Flag of New Zealand	Dame Silvia Cartwright; Peter Cartwright	Governor-General of New Zealand; Spouse of the Governor General
Nicaragua	Flag of Nicaragua	Enrique Bolaños; Norman José Caldera Cardenal; Armando Luna; José Cuadra	President of the Republic; Minister of Foreign Affairs; Ambassador to the Holy See; Ambassador to Italy
Niger	Flag of Niger	Mireille Fatouma Ausseil	Ambassador
Nigeria	Flag of Nigeria	Olusegun Obasanjo	President
Norway	Flag of Norway	Queen Sonja; Kjell Magne Bondevik	Queen Consort; Prime Minister of Norway

=== P ===
Country	Flag	Official delegation	Title
Pakistan	Flag of Pakistan	Muhammad Ijaz-ul-Haq	Minister of Religious Affairs
Palestine (Palestinian National Authority)	Flag of Palestine	Ahmed Qurei; Ghazi Hanania; Afif Safieh; Nimer Hammad; Mustafa Abu El-Rub	Prime Minister of Palestine; Spokesman for the Legislative Council; Director of the Diplomatic Representation to the Holy See; General Delegate in Italy; Assistant to the Prime Minister
Panama	Flag of Panama	Martín Torrijos; Vivian Fernández de Torrijos	President; First Lady
Paraguay	Flag of Paraguay	Luis Castiglioni; Leila Rachid de Cowles	Vice-President of the Republic; Minister of Foreign Affairs
Peru	Flag of Peru	Manuel Rodríguez Cuadros; Eliane Karp; Eduardo Salhuana; Antero Flores Aráoz	Minister of Foreign Affairs; First Lady; Minister of Justice; President of the Congress of the Republic
Philippines	flag of the Philippines	Gloria Macapagal Arroyo; Evangelina Lourdes Arroyo; Thelmo Cunanan; Georgina de Venecia; Howard Dee	President of the Philippines; Presidential Daughter; SS chairman (former ambassador to Cambodia) wife of House Speaker Jose de Venecia, Jr. former Ambassador to the Holy See
Poland	Flag of Poland	Aleksander Kwaśniewski; Jolanta Kwaśniewska; Lech Wałęsa; Danuta Wałęsa; Marek Belka; Włodzimierz Cimoszewicz; Longin Pastusiak; Hanna Suchocka; Tadeusz Mazowiecki; Wiesław Chrzanowski	President of the Republic; First Lady former President of the Republic former First Lady; Prime Minister; Marshal of the Sejm; Marshal of the Senate; Ambassador to the Holy See former Prime Minister former Marshal of the Sejm
Portugal	Flag of Portugal	Jorge Sampaio; Maria José Ritta; Diogo Freitas do Amaral; António dos Santos Ramalho Eanes	President of the Republic; First Lady; Minister of Foreign Affairs former President of the Republic

=== Q ===
Country	Flag	Official delegation	Title
Qatar		Sheikh Hamad Bin Khalifa Al Thani	Emir of Qatar

=== R ===
Country	Flag	Official delegation	Title
Romania	Flag of Roumanie	Traian Băsescu; Călin Popescu-Tăriceanu; King Michael I Emil Constantinescu; Ion Iliescu	President of the Republic; Prime Minister former King of Romania former President of the Republic former President of the Republic
Russia	Flag of Russie	Mikhail Fradkov	Prime Minister of Russia
Rwanda		Charles Murigande	Minister of Foreign Affairs

=== S ===
Country	Flag	Official delegation	Title
San Marino	Flag of San Marino	Fausta Morganti; Cesare Antonio Gasperoni; Fabio Berardi; Giovanni Galassi; Marcello Beccari	Captain Regent; Captain Regent; Secretary of State for Foreign and Political Affairs; Ambassador to the Holy See; Chief of State Protocol
Saudi Arabia	Flag of Saudi Arabia	Abdulmohsin bin Abdulaziz Al-Akkas; Hamad Al-Hajri; Ibrahim Al-Manie	Minister of Social Affairs
Senegal	Flag of Sénégal	Abdoulaye Wade	President of the Republic
Serbia and Montenegro	flag de Serbia and Montenegro	Svetozar Marović; Vuk Drašković; Boris Tadić; Filip Vujanović; Darko Tanasković	President of the Republic; Minister of Foreign Affairs; President of Serbia; President of Montenegro; Ambassador to the Holy See
Singapore	Flag of Singapore	Shunmugam Jayakumar; Walter Woon; Alexander Lim	Deputy Prime Minister, Minister of Law; Ambassador to the Holy See; First Secretary
Slovakia	Flag of Slovaquie	Ivan Gašparovič; Pavol Hrušovský; Eduard Kukan	President of the Republic; President of Parliament; Minister of Foreign Affairs
Slovenia	Flag of Slovenia	Janez Drnovšek; Janez Janša	President of the Republic; Prime Minister
South Africa	Flag of South Africa	Jacob Zuma; Lenin Shope; N.J. Baloyi	Vice President of the Republic; Ambassador; Vice President's advisor
South Korea	Flag of South Korea	Lee Hai-chan	Prime Minister
Spain	Flag of Spain	King Juan Carlos I Queen Sofía; José Luis Rodríguez Zapatero; Miguel Ángel Moratinos; Mariano Rajoy	King of Spain; Queen Consort; Prime Minister; Minister of Foreign Affairs; Leader of the Opposition
Sri Lanka	Flag of Sri Lanka	Mahinda Rajapakse; Milroy Fernando	Prime Minister; Minister of Christian Affairs
Sweden	Flag of Suède	King Carl XVI Gustaf; Queen Silvia; Göran Persson	King of Sweden; Queen Consort; Prime Minister of Sweden
Switzerland	Flag of Suisse	Samuel Schmid	President of the Confederation
Syria	Flag of Syrie	Bashar al-Assad; Asma al-Assad	President of the Republic; First Lady

=== T ===
Country	Flag	Official delegation	Title
Tanzania	Flag of Tanzanie	George Kahama	Minister for Cooperative Development
Thailand	Flag of Thaïlande	Surakiart Sathirathai	Deputy Prime Minister
Tunisia	Flag of Tunisie	Mohamed Ghannouchi	Prime Minister
Turkey	Flag of Turquie	Recep Tayyip Erdoğan; Mehmet Aydin	Prime Minister; Minister of State

=== U ===
Country	Flag	Official delegation	Title
Uganda	Flag of Ouganda	Gilbert Bukenya	Vice-President of the Republic
Ukraine		Viktor Yushchenko; Kateryna Yushchenko	President; First Lady
United Arab Emirates	flag of the United Arab Emirates	Sheikh Abdullah bin Zayed Al Nahyan	Minister of Information
United Kingdom	Flag of Royaume-Uni	Prince Charles; Tony Blair; Cherie Blair; Michael Howard; Charles Kennedy	Prince of Wales; Prime Minister of the United Kingdom; Spouse of the Prime Minister; Leader of Her Majesty's Opposition; Liberal Democrat leader
United States	flag des États-Unis d'Amérique	George W. Bush; Laura Bush; Condoleezza Rice; George H. W. Bush; Bill Clinton	President of the United States of America; First Lady; Secretary of State of the United States of America; Former President; Former President
Uruguay	Flag of Uruguay	María Auxiliadora Delgado	First Lady

=== V ===
Country	Flag	Official delegation	Title
Vanuatu	Flag of Vanuatu	Sato Kilman	Deputy Prime Minister and Minister of Foreign Affairs
Venezuela	Flag of Venezuela	Alí Rodríguez; Jorge Giordani; Rodrigo Chávez; Roy Chaderton	Minister of Foreign Affairs; Minister of Planning; Ambassador to Italy; Ambassador to France

=== Z ===
Country	Flag	Official delegation	Title
Zimbabwe	Flag of Zimbabwe	Robert Mugabe; Herbert Murerwa; Mr Bimha; Mr Chihuri; Mary Margaret Muchada	President; Minister of Advanced Education; Secretary to Foreign Affairs, Ambassador; Personal Assistant to the President; Ambassador

== International organizations ==
Organization	Flag	Official delegation	Title
Sovereign Military Order of the Knights of Malta	flag of Sovereign Military Order of the Knights of Malta	Fra' Andrew Bertie; Fra' Giacomo Dalla Torre del Tempio di Sanguinetto; Count Jacques de Liedekerke; Marquis Gian Luca Chiavari; Jean-Pierre Mazery	Prince and Grand Master; Grand Commander Grand Chancellor; Receiver of the Common Treasure; Member of the Sovereign Council
Council of Europe	flag of Europe	Terry Davis; Adam Daniel Rotfeld; Rene van der Linden; Giovanni di Stasi	Secretary-General; Président du Comité des ministres Président de l'Assemblée parlementaire Président du Congrès des pouvoirs locaux et régionaux
Arab League	flag of the Arab League	Amr Moussa; Mohamed Ali Nasser; Hala Gad	Secretary-General; Chief of Protocol, Ambassador; Member of the Office of the Secretary General
United Nations	flag of the UN	Kofi Annan; Nane Annan; Donald Patterson	Secretary-General; Spouse of the Secretary General
European Union	flag of Europe	José Manuel Barroso; Jean-Claude Juncker; Josep Borrell; Danuta Hübner; Franco Frattini; Benita Ferrero-Waldner	President of the European Commission; President of the European Council; President of the European Parliament; Commissioner in charge of Regional Policy; Commissioner in charge of Justice; Commissioner in charge of external relations
NATO		Jaap de Hoop Scheffer; Jeannine de Hoop Scheffer; Alessandro Minuto-Rizzo	Secretary-General; Consort of the Secretary General; Vice-Secretary General, Ambassador
OSCE		Dimitrij Rupel; Ján Kubis; Tatjana Pirc	Foreign minister of Slovenia, acting president of the OSCE; Secretary-General of the OSCE; Second Secretary of the Ministry of Foreign Affairs of Slovenia
ILO		Juan Somavia; Dominique Peccoud; Maria Angelica Ducci	Director General; Coordinator for Relations with the Holy See; Office Head
FAO		Jacques Diouf; David Harsharik; Michel Savini	Director General; Adjunct Director General; Head of the Office of the Director General
UNESCO	flag of UNESCO	Koïchiro Matsuura; Krista Pikkat	Director General; Office Member
IFAD		Lennart Båge; Ewa Westman Båge; Cyril Enweze	President; Consort of the President; Vice-President
Office of the U.N. High Commissioner for Refugees		Kamel Morjane; Walter Irvine; Michele Manca di Nissa	Assistant to the High Commissioner; Delegate for Italy, Malta, San Marino and the Holy See; Vice-Delegate for Italy, Malta, San Marino and the Holy See
World Food Programme		James T. Morris; John Powell; Susana Malcorra	Executive Director; Adjunct Executive Director; Adjunct Executive Director
U.N. Office on Drugs and Crime		Antonio Maria Costa	Executive Director of UNODC

== Religious leaders ==
Eastern Christian churches

- Bartholomew I, Ecumenical Patriarch of Constantinople, primus inter pares of the Eastern Orthodox Church
- Karekin II, Catholicos of the Armenian Apostolic Church
- Abune Paulos, Patriarch of the Ethiopian Orthodox Tewahedo Church
- Mesrob II Mutafyan, Armenian Patriarch of Istanbul and Turkey
- Christodoulos, Archbishop of Athens
- Anastasios, Archbishop of Tirana, Durrës, and all Albania
- Jovan, Metropolitan of Zagreb-Ljubljana and All-Italy of the Serbian Orthodox Church
- Kirill, Metropolitan of Smolensk-Kaliningrad, head of the Department of Interchurch relations of the Russian Orthodox Church
- Lavrentije, Bishop of Šabac and Valjevo of the Serbian Orthodox Church
- Leo, Archbishop of Karelia and All Finland
- Seraphim, Bishop of Ottawa, of the Orthodox Church in America

Anglican Communion

- Rowan Williams, Lord Archbishop of Canterbury and Primate of All England, spiritual leader of the Church of England and primus inter pares of the Anglican Communion

Protestant churches

- Dr Alison Elliot, Moderator of the General Assembly of the Church of Scotland
- K. G. Hammar, Archbishop of Uppsala, Head of the Church of Sweden
- Jukka Paarma, Archbishop of Turku, Head of the Church of Finland
- Finn Wagle, Bishop of Nidaros and Primus of the Norwegian Lutheran State Church (part of Norwegian official delegation)

Jewish religious leaders

- Oded Viener, representing the Chief Rabbis of Israel
- Shear-Yishuv Cohen, Chief Rabbi of Haifa
- Riccardo Di Segni, Chief Rabbi of Rome

Druze religious leaders

- Mowafaq Tarif, spiritual leader of the Druze community in Israel

== Unofficial delegations ==
A selection of dignitaries not seated in the section for official national delegations during the funeral:

Brazil

Individually invited (by the Holy See):

- Fernando Henrique Cardoso, former president of Brazil
- Itamar Franco, Brazilian Ambassador to Italy; former president of Brazil
- Bishop Odilo Scherer, secretary-general of the CNBB (Assembly of the Brazilian Bishops)

Presidential delegation (invited by the President, but did not seat for Requiem Mass):

- José Sarney, Brazilian senator; former president of Brazil and former president of the Brazilian Senate
- Henry Sobel, leading Rabbi of the Brazilian Jewish community
- Sheik Armando Hussein Saleh, of the "Brazilian Mosque" (representing the Muslims of Brazil)
- Rolf Schunemann, of the Brazilian Lutheran Church (representing the Protestants of Brazil)
- Father João Áviz, Archbishop of Brasília
- Father José Ernanne, representing the Brazilian clergy

Canada

All representing Quebec

- Gérald Tremblay, Mayor of Montreal
- Louise Harel, Representative of the Parti Québécois
- Mario Dumont, Member of the National Assembly of Quebec

Germany

- Angela Merkel, Party leader of the CDU
- Edmund Stoiber, Minister-President of Bavaria

Philippines

- Leonida Vera, ambassador to the Holy See
- Hermilando Mandanas, Batangas congressman

United States

Members of Congress and other dignitaries (not part of the official delegation, thus no VIP treatment):

- John Kerry, Senator from Massachusetts
- Bill Frist, Senate Majority Leader, Republican, from Tennessee
- Ted Kennedy, Senator from Massachusetts, last living brother of John F. Kennedy (the first Catholic to serve as U.S. President).
- White House Chief of Staff Andrew Card
- New York Governor George Pataki
- New York City Mayor Michael Bloomberg

== Notes ==
1. "China" used here refers to the Republic of China (ROC) and commonly known as Taiwan, rather than the People's Republic of China (PRC), which does not have diplomatic relations with the Holy See and did not receive any invitations to the funeral. Although the ROC Government lost control of Mainland China at the end of the Chinese Civil War, the Holy See still recognizes the ROC, but not the PRC, as the legitimate representative for the government of "China".
2. The low representation of Monaco is due to the death of Rainier III, Prince of Monaco. Monaco's head of state died two days before the funeral of the Pope.
