= Zámolyi Channel =

Location
- Country: Hungary
- County: Györ-Moson-Soprn

Physical characteristics
- Source
  - location: Győrzámoly, Plain of Moson, Little Hungarian Plain, Hungary
- Mouth
  - location: Szavai Channel, North-East from Győrzámoly
  - coordinates: 47°44′24″N 17°34′09″E

Zámolyi Channel originates on the Mosoni Plain, Little Hungarian Plain, in the county of Györ-Moson-Soprn, Hungary. It flows southwestward to Győrzámoly, where it joins the Mosoni-Duna.

== Settlements at the banks ==
- Győrzámoly
- Győrladamér
