= Imre Kozma =

Hungarian Roman Catholic priest (1940–2024)

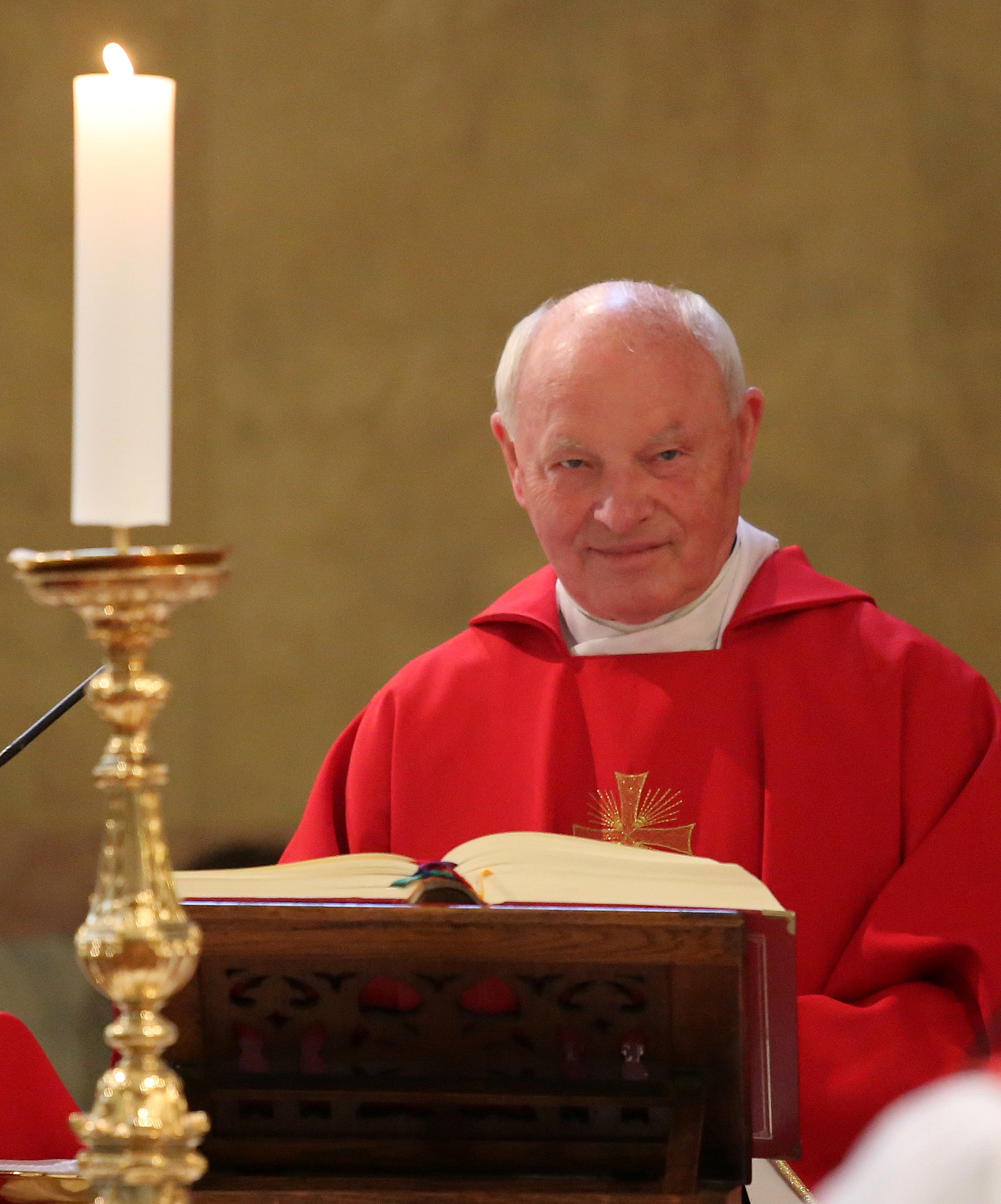
Imre Kozma in 2013

Imre Kozma (4 June 1940 – 17 October 2024) was a Hungarian Roman Catholic priest, the founder of the Hungarian Charity Service of the Sovereign Military Order of Malta, patron of East German refugees arriving to Hungary in 1988–89.

== Biography ==
Imre Kozma was born in 1940 in Győrzámoly. His father died in a train accident in 1941 and he was raised by his mother and grandmother. He completed his secondary education in 1958 at Czuczor Gergely Benedictine Secondary School. Subsequently, he studied theology at the Esztergom Seminary. He was ordained as a priest in 1963; first he became the curate of Tát and Dorog, then he served at the Holy Family Parish in Zugliget (Budapest) from 1966 to 1968. He served at the Church of Saint Peter of Alcantara, better known as the Franciscan Church of Pest, from 1968 until 1977. Subsequently he returned to Zugliget, where he arranged a regular youth and family pastoral care. He organized a system of charitable activities in the parish, manned chiefly by his youth group. He served in Zugliget until 1997.

In 1987 he was approached by the Hungarian association-in-exile of the Sovereign Military Order of Malta, then operating mostly from West Germany, which was looking for ways to start charitable activities openly inside Hungary. He thus came into contact with Baroness Csilla von Boeselager, who was the leading organiser of humanitarian shipments sent by the Order of Malta from West Germany to Hungary. Together, they quickly built up a powerful network of distribution of aid to needy persons within Hungary and to refugees from Romania. The need for a dedicated civil society organisation quickly became apparent. Due to the fact that organisations of that kind were not allowed in Hungary in the 1980s, von Boeselager established the charity service in Germany as Ungarischer Malteser Caritas-Dienst. In 1989, as legal obstacles ceased to exist, the Hungarian Charity Service of the Order of Malta was founded, and Father Kozma became a member of the Sovereign Military Order of Malta.

On 13 August 1989, after celebrating his Sunday Mass, he was asked by the consul of West Germany in Budapest to help accommodate and take care of the East German refugees, who were flooding into Hungary and thus, paralysing the embassy’s work. Kozma agreed to that without the slightest hesitation. He later stated: "A medieval interpretation of the church has come to life again: Shelter". Refugees from East Germany were accommodated by the Parish in Zugliget from 14 August. That very evening nearly a thousand people were sheltered but the following months a series of new sanctuaries provided for almost 48,600 people altogether. The consulate of West Germany even moved to the garden of the parish for a time, to issue West German travel documents to the refugees – a politically highly delicate and dangerous act, made possible only by the chaotic situation in mid-1989. These events captured the attention of the leadership of East Germany as well; a list of 101 people was compiled, to be taken to the International Court of Justice, with Imre Kozma in the lead, for helping those who violated the laws of "Sovereign East Germany".

The Hungarian Charity Service of the Order of Malta was facing another humanitarian crisis in December, at the time of the Romanian revolution; then they gathered twenty-two truckloads of donations and transported them to Transylvania. At the time of the Yugoslav Wars in the 1990s Father Kozma managed to convince the Serbian commander of Vukovar to let the elderly and young, who were trapped in the city, to flee to Hungary. Since then, the charity service has built a countrywide network and is one of the biggest charity services of Hungary. Kozma joined the Order of Brothers Hospitallers of Saint John of God ("Barmherzige Brüder"), taking his vows in 1999; later he became the preceptor in Budapest. He arranged the reintroduction of the Order in Hungary and successfully reclaimed their hospitals in Vác and Budapest in 2000.

Acknowledgements: He was acknowledged in many ways for his humanitarian efforts in Hungary and abroad as well.

- 1992 – Protonotary apostolic (an honorary prelate of the Pope with the style Monsignor)
- 1992 – Széchenyi Prize
- 1995 – prize for supporting the minorities (Kisebbségekért díj)
- 1999 – Grand Cross of Merit of the Order of Malta
- 2003 – Order of Merit of the Republic of Hungary, Commander's Cross,
- 2005 – Prima Primissima Prize
- 2007 – Mindszenty medal
- 2010 – Chevalier of the Legion of Honour (France)
- 2013 – Sándor Giesswein medal

Kozma died on 17 October 2024, at the age of 84.
