= Heimerzheim =

Coordinates: 50°43′N 6°55′E

Map
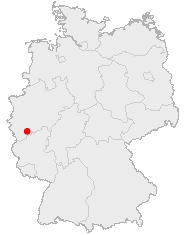

Heimerzheim is the largest local part of the municipality Swisttal in the North-Rhine/Westphalian (North Rhine Westphalia) Rhein-Sieg district. It is situated approximately 20 km west of Bonn. In 2015 the local part had 6,199 inhabitants.

== History ==
Heimerzheim was mentioned for the first time documentary in the year 1074, its goods and land belonged to the St. Kunibert abbey in Cologne.

== Buildings and culture ==
The place has two castles, in the north Kriegshoven Castle and in the south Heimerzheim Castle; both are in noble family estate. Heimerzheim has two schools and an active association life; one of the village highlights is annual the contactor celebration on the first weekend in July. The branch office FH federation (specialist area public security) Heimerzheim serves among other things the Federal Intelligence Service (Bundesnachrichtendienst), the Federal Criminal Police Office (Germany) (Bundeskriminalamt) as well as the Federal Office for the Protection of the Constitution (Verfassungsschutz) as training centre. It is placed there in the range resident of the German Federal Police (Bundespolizei).

== Famous people connected with Heimerzheim ==
- Freiherr Philipp von Boeselager, Officer of the Wehrmacht, member of the 20 July Plot
- Freiherr Georg von Boeselager, Officer of the Wehrmacht, member of the 20 July Plot
