= Albrecht von Boeselager =

German lawyer and forester

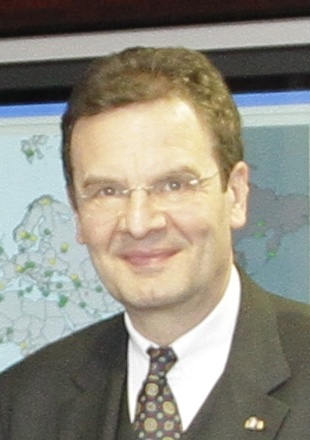

Grand Chancellor of the Sovereign Military Order of Malta
- In office 28 January 2017 – 4 September 2022
- Monarchs: Ludwig von Rumerstein (Acting); Giacomo dalla Torre; Ruy Gonçalo do Valle Peixoto de Villas Boas (Acting); Marco Luzzago (Acting); Ruy Gonçalo do Valle Peixoto de Villas Boas (Acting); John T. Dunlap
- Preceded by: John Edward Critien
- Succeeded by: Riccardo Paternò di Montecupo
- In office 31 May 2014 – 8 December 2016
- Monarch: Matthew Festing
- Preceded by: Jean-Pierre Mazery
- Succeeded by: John Edward Critien

Grand Hospitaller of the Sovereign Military Order of Malta
- In office 1989–2014
- Monarchs: Andrew Bertie; Giacomo dalla Torre (Acting); Matthew Festing
- Preceded by: ???
- Succeeded by: Dominique de La Rochefoucauld-Montbel

Personal details
- Born: Albrecht Freiherr von Boeselager; 4 October 1949 (age 77) Altenahr, Rhineland-Palatinate, West Germany (now Germany)
- Spouse: Praxedis zu Guttenberg
- Relatives: Philipp von Boeselager (father); Georg von Boeselager (uncle); Enoch zu Guttenberg (brother-in-law)
- Education: University of Bonn; University of Geneva; University of Freiburg

Albrecht Freiherr von Boeselager (born 4 October 1949) is a German lawyer and forester, and was formerly a member of the Sovereign Council of the Sovereign Military Order of Malta. He served as Grand Hospitaller from 1989 to 2014, and from 2014 until 3 September 2022 as its grand chancellor. Boeselager was at the centre of a leadership controversy within the Order of Malta in late 2016 and early 2017. After Boeslager was suspended as grand chancellor, Pope Francis intervened to restore him to office and require the resignation of the prince and grand master of the order, Matthew Festing. Pope Francis dissolved the Sovereign Council on 3 September 2022, and appointed Ricardo Paternò di Montecupo as grand chancellor.

== Biography ==
Boeselager was born on 4 October 1949 in Altenahr, Rhineland-Palatinate, West Germany. He is descended from the Boeselager family, an old German Catholic noble family from Magdeburg. His father was Philipp von Boeselager, an officer in the Wehrmacht who took part in the 20 July plot to assassinate Adolf Hitler in 1944. His mother was Rosa Maria von Westphalen zu Fürstenberg. His uncle was Georg von Boeselager; he also has a brother called Georg who is a banker. Boeselager married Praxedis zu Guttenberg, sister of Enoch zu Guttenberg.

After graduating from the Jesuit Aloisiuskolleg in Bonn-Bad Godesberg, he studied law at the University of Bonn, the University of Geneva and the University of Freiburg. From 1968 to 1970, following in the footsteps of much of the Boeselager family, he served in the military and retired as a lieutenant of the reserve forces of West Germany. From 1976 to 1990 he worked as a lawyer, and in 1987 took over his father's agriculture and forestry operation. He is the owner of Burg Kreuzberg an der Ahr. As a local forest owner, he is in the succession of his father, the chairman of the forestry association of his hometown Ahrweiler.

== Order of Malta ==
In 1976, Boeselager was admitted to the Sovereign Military Order of Malta as a Knight of Honour and Devotion. He was raised to the rank of a Knight of Honour and Devotion in Obedience in 1985. From 1982 to 2015 he was Chancellor of the German Association of the Order. From 1 January 1982 to 31 March 31, 1985, he was managing director and from 14 January 1985 to 30 April 1990 honorary director of the Malteser Hilfsdienst (an ambulance service associated with the order) in the Archdiocese of Cologne. He now holds the rank of a Bailiff Knight Grand Cross of Honour and Devotion in Obedience.

In addition to his work in the presidium of Malteser Hilfsdienst e.V., he has been a member of the Order Government in Rome since 1989, first as a Grand Hospitaller and since 2014 as a Grand Chancellor (the equivalent rank of Head of Government or Prime Minister). After his election in 1989, he was re-elected by the General Chapter in 1994, 1999, 2004 and on 8 June 2009 for a five-year term. In addition Albrecht von Boeselager has been a member of the Pontifical Council for the Pastoral Care of Health Care Workers since 1990 and since 1994 a member of the Pontifical Council Cor Unum. On 31 May 2014, he was elected Grand Chancellor of the Order by the General Chapter in Rome.

Boeselager was at the center of a constitutional crisis within the Sovereign Military Order of Malta at the turn of the year between 2016 and 2017. Boeselager was dismissed from his positions and expelled from the Order of Malta by Grand Master Matthew Festing for alleged involvement in distributing condoms (considered "instrinsically evil" in Catholic teachings) in Myanmar through the Malteser International. The impeachment was only withdrawn, at the request of Pope Francis, in January 2017.

On 8 December 2016, Grand Master Matthew Festing told the leaders of the National Institutions of the Sovereign Military Order of Malta that the Grand Chancellor Albrecht Freiherr von Boeselager would be leaving office. According to media reports, Festing and Cardinal Patron of the Order of Malta, Raymond Leo Burke, demanded Boeselager's resignation, which he refused, whereupon Festing declared him deposed and provisionally expelled from the Order of Malta; the main reason cited was for the distribution of condoms by Malteser in Myanmar.

Boeselager appealed against his removal to Pope Francis, who appointed a five-member commission of inquiry of the State Secretariat under Cardinal Pietro Parolin to investigate. Festing disputed the legitimacy of this intervention of the Pope in what he regarded as the internal affairs of the Order, a sovereign entity.

The UK-based liberal Catholic magazine The Tablet interpreted the dispute as evidence of a power struggle between Cardinal Raymond Burke and Pope Francis. On 25 January 2017, the Holy See Press Office announced that Grand Master Festing had submitted his resignation during an audience with Pope Francis. Boeselager had meanwhile complained to a religious court against his dismissal. At its meeting of 28 January 2017, the Sovereign Council of the Order of Malta accepted Festing's resignation and the reinstatement of Boeselager.

The leadership of the German Association of the Order of Malta praised the role of Bergoglio and Parolin in the dispute over the Order of Malta. The chancellor of the German branch, Stephan Freiherr Spies von Büllesheim, thanked the Pope for helping the German members so quickly and confidently.

The General Chapter meeting in Rome confirmed von Büllesheim as Grand Chancellor for another five years in 2019.

Sources inside the order indicated that the row was a pretext, that Cardinal Burke wanted the knights to promote his traditionalist vision of Catholicism and that when von Boeselager was sacked he had told friends that he had been labelled as a "a liberal Catholic". Von Boeselager, in an interview said, "I think it [the condoms] was a pretext." The Grand Chancellor, meanwhile, told The Tablet during an interview at the Knights' headquarters in the Via dei Condotti, Rome, "The root cause was an increasing difference of opinions between the former Grand Master and the government of the order. It was less a difference in fundamental visions about the order but more on quite concrete matters of governance".

== Honours and awards ==
- Austria: Grand Decoration of Honour in Gold with Sash of the Decoration of Honour for Services to the Republic of Austria (1999)
- Hungary: Grand Cross of the Order of Merit of the Republic of Hungary (2009)
- Italy: Knight Grand Cross of the Order of Merit of the Italian Republic (1989)
- Lithuania: Grand Cross of the Order of the Lithuanian Grand Duke Gediminas (1999)
- Malta: Honorary Companion with Breast Star of the National Order of Merit (2000)
- Portugal:
  - Grand Cross of the Portuguese Order of Christ (2010)
  - Grand Cross of the Order of Infante Dom Henrique (1990)
- Romania: Grand Officer of the Order of the Star of Romania (2012)
- Slovakia: Second Class of the Order of the White Double Cross (1998)
- Spain:
  - Knight Grand Cross of the Order of Isabella the Catholic (31 July 2015)
  - Knight Grand Cross of the Order of Civil Merit (21 May 1999)

== See also ==
- Boeselager
- Catholic theology of sexuality

Political offices
Preceded by Jean-Pierre Mazery	Grand Chancellor of the Sovereign Military Order of Malta; 2014–2016	Succeeded by John Edward Critien
Preceded by John Edward Critien	Grand Chancellor of the Sovereign Military Order of Malta; 2017–2022	Succeeded by Riccardo Paternò di Montecupo
