= John Edward Critien =

Maltese Roman Catholic official (1949–2022)

John Critien

Grand Chancellor of the Sovereign Military Order of Malta
- In office 8 December 2016 – 28 January 2017; Acting: 8 December 2016 – 14 December 2016
- Monarch: Matthew Festing
- Preceded by: Albrecht von Boeselager
- Succeeded by: Albrecht von Boeselager

Personal details
- Born: John Edward Critien; 29 September 1949 Sliema, Malta
- Died: 3 December 2022 (aged 73) Magistral Palace, Rome, Italy
- Education: University of Malta; University for Foreigners of Perugia; University of Pisa

John Edward Critien (29 September 1949 – 3 December 2022) was a Maltese Roman Catholic official. He served as Bailiff Grand Cross of Justice of the Sovereign Military Order of Malta and as a member of the Chapter of the Grand Priory of Rome. From 2014 to 2019 he was a member of the Order's Sovereign Council.

== Early life and career ==
Critien was born in Sliema, Malta on 29 September 1949, the younger son of Major Frank Edward Critien and of his wife May Grech. He received the degree Bachelor of Arts from the Royal University of Malta and then pursued further studies in Italy at the University for Foreigners Perugia and at the University of Pisa. He lived in Pisa for 22 years and taught English language and literature at a private school, the Scuola Mondolingue.

== Order of Malta ==
Critien was involved in the development of volunteer youth groups for the Order of Malta in Pisa and in Florence. In 1983 he was admitted as a knight of the third class in the Grand Priory of Rome. In 1993 he made perpetual religious vows as a Knight of Justice.

Critien was elected to a five-year term as a member of the Sovereign Council in 1994. From 1994 to 2000 he lived at the Order's headquarters in Rome, Palazzo Malta, and was responsible for the Order's library, archives, and art collections. In 1999 he organised an exhibition in Malta of fine bookbindings from the Order's collection in Rome and from the National Library of Malta. In July 2000 Critien was appointed Knight Resident at Fort St. Angelo, Malta.

In September 2001 Critien was promoted to the rank of Knight Grand Cross of Justice and in 2012 to the rank of Bailiff Grand Cross of Justice, the first ever Maltese to hold this grade in the Order. He was elected to a second five-year term as a member of the Sovereign Council in 2014.

In December 2016 the Prince and Grand Master Fra’ Matthew Festing appointed Critien Grand Chancellor ad interim after removing Albrecht von Boeselager from that office. On 14 December the Sovereign Council confirmed Critien's appointment. On 28 January 2017 the Sovereign Council, after accepting the resignation of Fra' Matthew Festing as Prince and Grand Master, annulled Critien's appointment as Grand Chancellor ad interim and restored Boeselager as Grand Chancellor. Critien remained a member of the Sovereign Council until the end of his five-year term in 2019.

Critien was appointed Grand Prior of Rome on 28 August 2022; he was the first Maltese and the first non-noble to hold this office. He died at Palazzo Malta in Rome on 3 December of the same year, at the age of 73.

== Decorations ==
- Grand Cross, Order pro Merito Melitensi
- Knight Grand Cross of Merit, Order of Merit of the Italian Republic
- Knight Grand Cross, Order of St. Gregory the Great
- Knight Grand Cross of Justice, Sacred Military Constantinian Order of Saint George (House of Bourbon-Two Sicilies), 1994
- Knight Grand Cross, Order of Saints Maurice and Lazarus
- Knight Grand Cross, Order of the Yugoslav Crown

== Notes ==
Political offices
Preceded by Albrecht von Boeselager	Grand Chancellor of the Sovereign Military Order of Malta; 2016–2017	Succeeded by Albrecht von Boeselager
