= Kriegshoven Castle =

- Burg Kriegshoven
- Heimerzheim, North Rhine-Westphalia
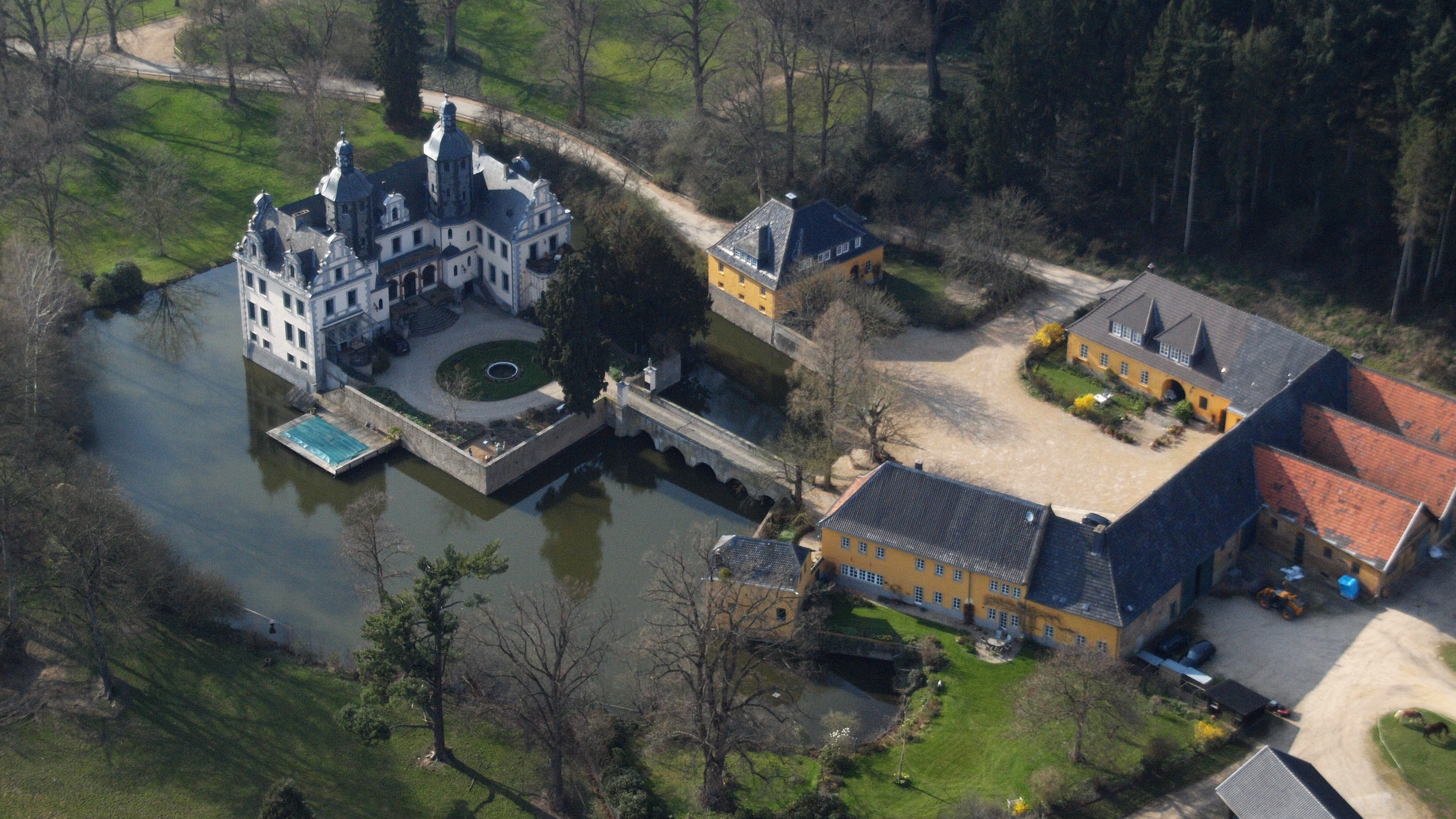
- Kriegshoven Castle

Location
- Location in Germany
- Coordinates: 50.726389°N 6.906667°E

Kriegshoven Castle (German: Burg Kriegshoven) is a castle in Heimerzheim, Swisttal municipality, Germany.

== History ==
The castle dates from at least the middle of the 13th century and was rebuilt in the 16th century. Its present appearance dates from another rebuilding scheme 1869. The castle is not open to the public.
