= Philipp von Boeselager =

German Wehrmacht officer, failed assassin of Adolf Hitler (1917–2008)

Philipp Freiherr von Boeselager
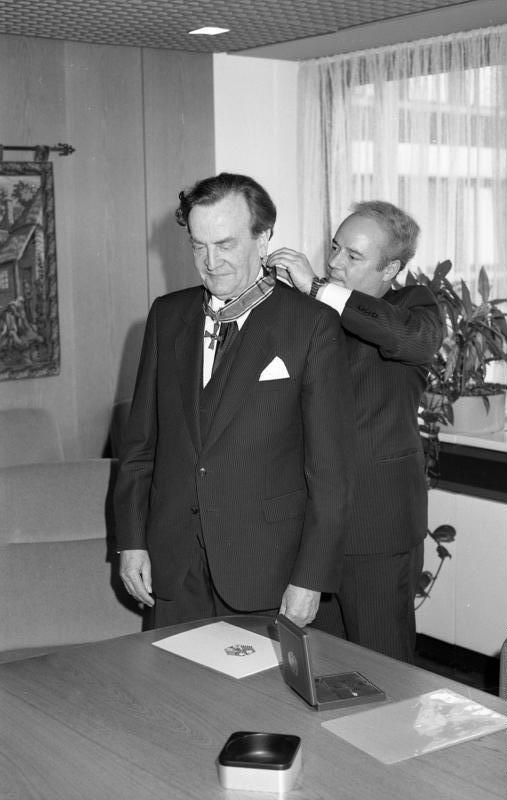
- Boeselager receiving the Order of Merit of the Federal Republic of Germany from Parliament Secretary Wolfgang von Geldern in 1989
- Born: 6 September 1917; Burg Heimerzheim, German Empire
- Died: 1 May 2008 (aged 90); Burg Kreuzberg, Altenahr, Germany
- Relatives: Georg von Boeselager (brother); Albrecht von Boeselager (son); Damian Boeselager (grandson)
- Military career
- Allegiance: Germany
- Rank: Major (Wehrmacht); Oberstleutnant (Bundeswehr)
- Unit: Cavalry Regiment Centre 3. Kavalleriebrigade
- Conflicts: Eastern Front (World War II)
- Awards: Knight's Cross of the Iron Cross
- Other work: economist, forester

Philipp Freiherr von Boeselager (6 September 1917 – 1 May 2008) was the second-last surviving member of the 20 July Plot, a conspiracy of Wehrmacht officers to assassinate the German dictator Adolf Hitler in 1944.

== Early life ==
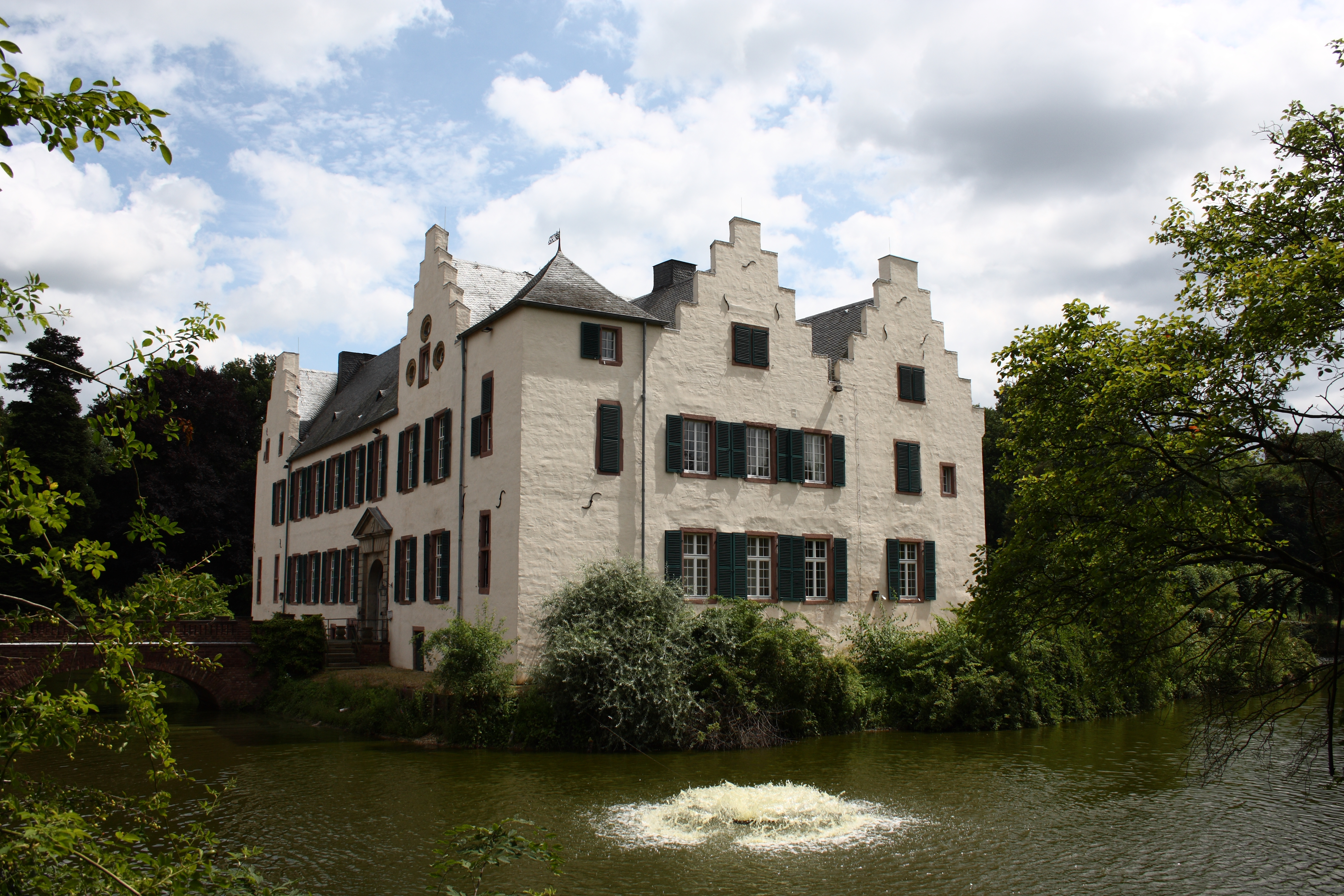
Burg Heimerzheim.

Born on 6 September 1917 at Burg Heimerzheim, near Bonn, he was the fifth and the second surviving son of the nine children of Albert Dominikus Hyacinthus Antonius Johannes Hubertus Vitus Joseph Maria Freiherr von Boeselager (Bonn 15 June 1883-Heimerzheim, Kr. Euskirchen 20 May 1956), by his wife (they married in Kassel on 22 September 1910), Maria-Theresia Ferdinandine Antonie Alonsia Freiin von Salis-Soglio (1890–1968), daughter of Anton Joseph Alonsius Nepomuk Stanislaus Maria Freiherr v. Salis-Soglio (1860–1939), of Gemünden and Mandel, Kreuznach, by Maria Adelheid Theresia Gräfin von Bissingen und Nippenburg (daughter of Ernst Maria Ferdinand Adam Johann Nepomuk Joseph Graf von Bissingen-Nippenburg). He attended Aloisius Jesuit secondary school Aloisiuskolleg in Godesberg.

== Role in conspiracy against Hitler ==
When Boeselager was a 25-year-old field lieutenant, he was part of Operation Walküre, a plan developed to take control of Germany once Hitler had been assassinated. Boeselager's role in the plan was to order his troops, who were unaware of the plot, to leave the front lines in Eastern Europe and to head west, where they would be airlifted to Berlin to seize crucial parts of the city in a full-scale coup d'état after Hitler had been killed.

Boeselager's opinion turned against the Nazi government in June 1942, after he received news that five Roma people had been shot in cold blood solely because of their ethnicity. Together with his commanding officer, Field Marshal Günther von Kluge, he joined a conspiracy to assassinate Hitler. The first attempt was in March 1943, when both Hitler and Heinrich Himmler were coming to the front to participate in a strategy meeting with Kluge's troops.

Boeselager was given a Walther PP with which he was to shoot both Hitler and Himmler at a dinner table in the officers' mess. However, nothing ever came of this plan because at the last minute, Himmler left Hitler's company, and the risk of leaving him alive to succeed Hitler was too great.

The second assassination attempt was in summer 1944. No longer caring about Himmler, the conspiracy planned to kill Hitler with a bomb when he was attending another strategy meeting in a wooden barracks. When the assassin's bomb failed to kill the Führer, Boeselager was informed in time to turn his unexplained cavalry retreat around and return to the front before suspicions could be aroused. Because of Boeselager's fortunate timing, his involvement in the operation went undetected, and he was not executed, unlike the majority of the conspirators. Philipp's brother Georg was also a participant in the plot, and likewise remained undetected, but was later killed in action on the Eastern Front.

Shortly before the end of the war, Boeselager overheard General Wilhelm Burgdorf saying, "When the war is over, we will have to purge, after the Jews, the Catholic officers in the army". The devoutly-Catholic Boeselager noisily objected, citing his own decorations for heroism in combat. Boeselager then left before Burgdorf could respond.

== Postwar life ==
After the war, Boeselager's part in the failed attempt on Hitler's life became known. He was regarded as a hero by many in Germany and France; in 1989 and 2004 respectively, he received the highest military medals that both countries could provide. He studied economics and became a forestry expert. Even in his old age, Boeselager still had nightmares about the conspiracy and the friends whom he lost during the war. He urged young people to become more involved in politics, as he felt apathy and the political inexperience of the German masses had been two of the key reasons why Hitler was able to come to power. The entrance to his residence in Kreuzberg bears the Latin motto Et si omnes ego non ("even if all, not I").

Boeselager was a member of K.D.St.V. Ripuaria Bonn, a Roman Catholic student fraternity at the University of Bonn that now belongs to the Cartellverband der katholischen deutschen Studentenverbindungen. Until his death on 1 May 2008, he still had the Walther PP pistol he was given to use to shoot Hitler.

In 2003 and 2007, Boeselager gave two interviews to the influential right-wing weekly newspaper Junge Freiheit. In the 2003 interview, he criticised re-united Germany's failure to restore property collectivised in East Germany after World War II (and privatised 1990–1994) to former owners and the widespread corruption of contemporary politicians on behalf of the 20 July plotters, whom he presented as selfless idealists fighting to restore the rule of law. He defined the political aim of the 1944 plotters as "saving the Reich" and denied that they would have sought peace with the Western Allies. Boeselager claimed that Germany invaded Poland in self-defence and that Soviet citizens and soldiers overwhelmingly welcomed the alleged Nazi liberation from Communist rule during the initial stage of Operation Barbarossa. He drew a firm line between the Wehrmacht and the SS with regard to supporting Hitler's policies, which he denounced as "criminal".

On 18 April 2008, just two weeks before his death on 1 May 2008, Philipp von Boeselager gave his last videotaped interview, which was conducted by Zora Wolter for the feature documentary The Valkyrie Legacy. It was televised on The History Channel in spring 2009 to coincide with the release of the film Valkyrie, starring Tom Cruise and directed by Bryan Singer. The documentary was produced by Singer and directed by Kevin Burns.

Ewald-Heinrich von Kleist-Schmenzin was the last survivor of the 20 July plot until his death on 8 March 2013.

== Marriage ==
Boeselager married Rosa Maria, born Gräfin von Westphalen zu Fürstenberg (1924 - 2014). Albrecht von Boeselager (born 4 October 1949, Altenahr), former Grand Chancellor of the Sovereign Military Order of Malta, is their child.

== Honours ==
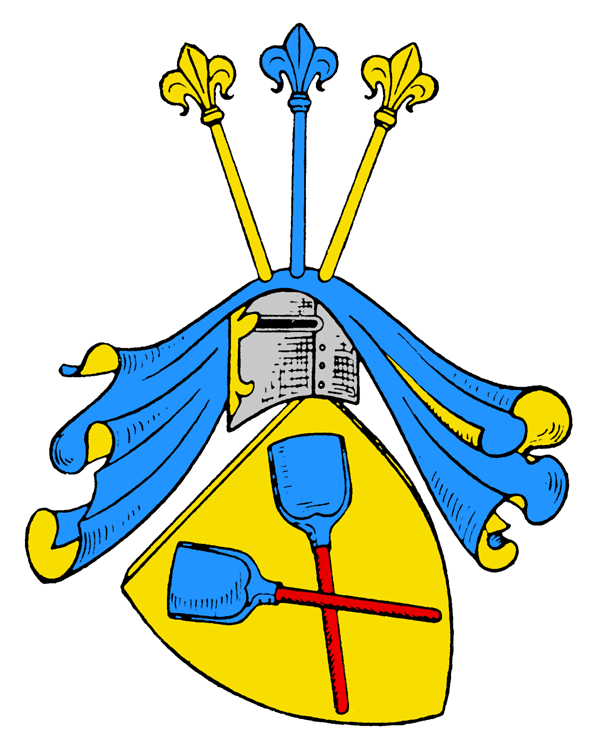
Boeselager arms

- Iron Cross (1939) 1st (1941) and 2nd class (1940)
- Knight's Cross of the Iron Cross on 20 July 1944 as Major and commander of the I./Kavallerie-Regiment Mitte
- Eastern Front Medal
- Wound Badge in Silver (1944)
- General Assault Badge
- Close Combat Clasp in Bronze
- Honour Roll Clasp of the Army (1944)
- Grand Cross of the Order of Merit of the Federal Republic of Germany (Großes Bundesverdienstkreuz des Verdienstordens der Bundesrepublik Deutschland, 1989)
- Officier de la Légion d'honneur (2004)

== See also ==
- Assassination attempts on Adolf Hitler
