= Győrzámoly =

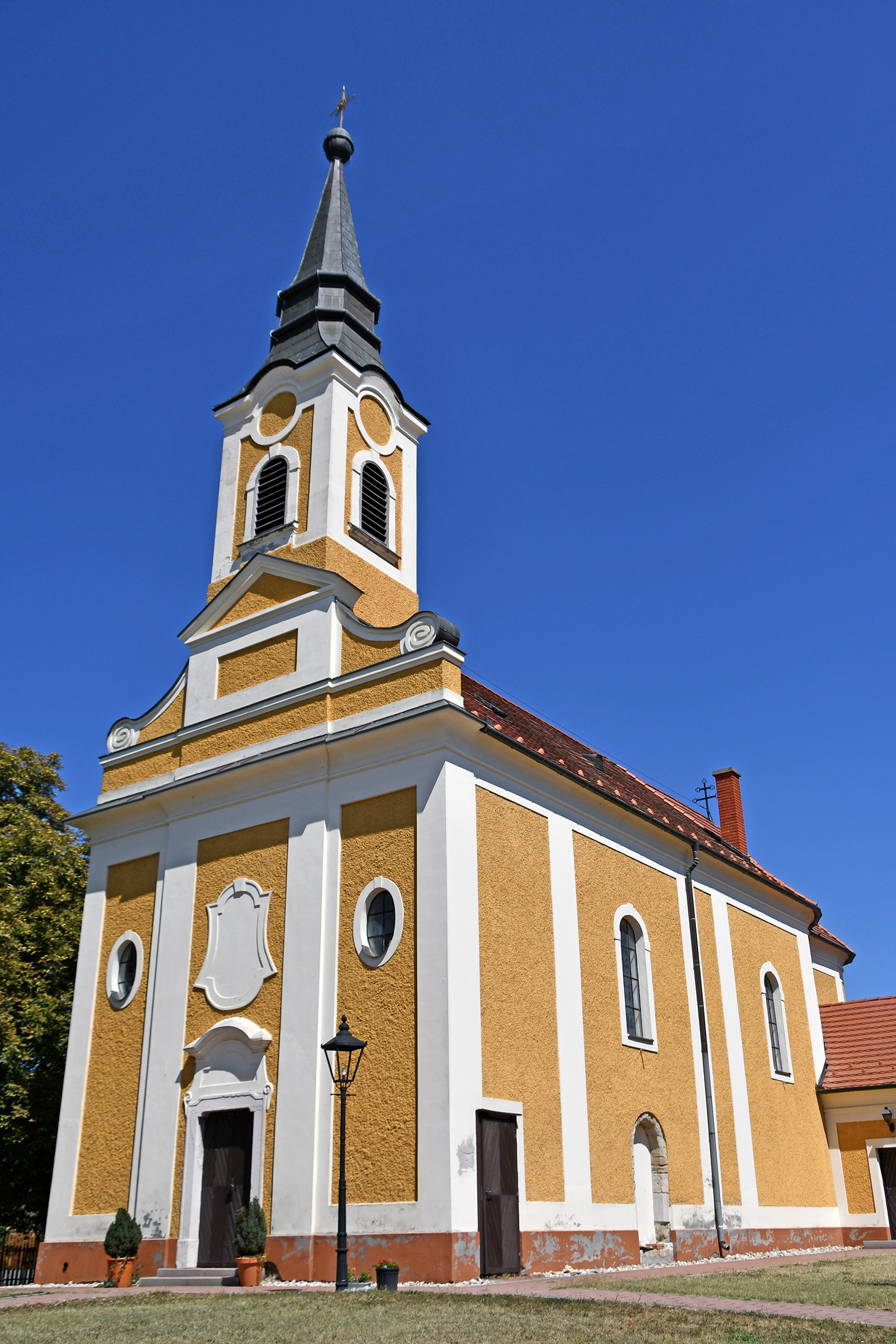
- Church of Saint Ladislaus

- Coat of arms

- Location of Győrzámoly
- Coordinates: 47.742°N 17.578°E
- Country: Hungary
- County: Győr-Moson-Sopron

Area
  - Total: 26.8 km^{2} (10.3 sq mi)

Population (2025)
  - Total: 3,994
  - Density: 149/km^{2} (386/sq mi)
- Time zone: UTC+1 (CET)
  - Summer (DST): UTC+2 (CEST)
- Postal code: 9172
- Area code: 96
- Website: https://www.gyorzamoly.hu/

Győrzámoly is a village in Győr-Moson-Sopron county, Hungary.

== Notable people ==
- Imre Kozma, Roman Catholic priest
