= Jean-Pierre Mazery =

French economist (born 1942)

His Excellency Bailiff Jean-Pierre Mazery
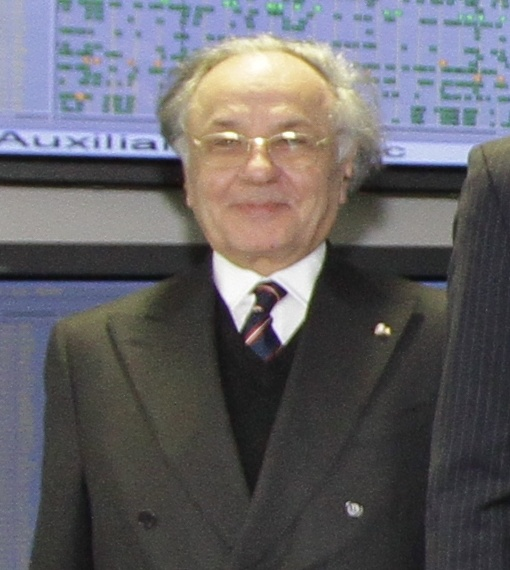
- Born: 5 December 1942 (age 83); Paris (16th arrondissement), France
- Occupations: Grand Chancellor and Minister (SMOM)
- Known for: Order of Malta
- Awards: Ribbon bars

Jean-Pierre Mazery (born 5 December 1942) is a French economist and was the Grand Chancellor (and Foreign Minister) of the Sovereign Military Order of Malta (SMOM) from 2005 - 2014.

== Career ==
Mazery studied at the University of Paris and Harvard Business School before becoming an economist. He has been a Knight of Malta since 1975, as Knight of Magistral Grace. On 16 April 2005, he was elected Grand Chancellor of the Order, following the resignation of H.E. Bailiff Count Jacques de Liedekerke and was re-elected to this office in 2009.

He first served under Prince and Grand Master Fra' Andrew Bertie and, since 2008, under Prince and Grand Master Fra' Matthew Festing at the Palazzo Malta in Rome. In recognition of his high office in the Order, he was promoted Bailiff Grand Cross of Honour and Devotion in Obedience. On 30 May 2014, Mazery was not re-elected as Grand Chancellor, the holder of the office now Albrecht Freiherr von Boeselager. The Grand Commander elect d'Ippolito was Fra' Ludwig Hoffmann von Rumerstein, thus reconfirming the traditional attribution of these positions to members of the nobility. This custom is not always respected.

== Personal life ==
Mazery is the son of Pierre Mazery, an architect, and his wife Mathilde d'Ornellas.

Mazery was married in 1973 to Christiane de Nicolay-Mazery, a writer.

They have two sons and a daughter.

== Honours and awards ==
- SMOM: Bailiff Grand Cross of Honour and Devotion in Obedience of the Sovereign Military Order of Malta
- SMOM: Grand Cross of the Order pro merito Melitensi
- France: Officer of the Legion of Honour (31 December 2009)
- France: Officer of the Order of Arts and Letters
- France: Knight of the National Order of Merit
- Monaco : Grand Officer of the Order of Saint-Charles (14 October 2009)
- Italy: Knight Grand Cross of the Order of Merit of the Italian Republic
- Holy See: Knight Grand Cross of the Order of Pius IX
- House of Romanov: Knight Grand Cross of the Order of St. Anna

== See also ==
- List of current foreign ministers

Catholic Church titles
Preceded by Count Jacques de Liedekerke	Grand Chancellor of Sovereign Military Order of Malta (SMOM); 2005 – 2014	Succeeded by Albrecht Freiherr von Boeselager
