= Csilla von Boeselager =

German baroness (1941–1994)

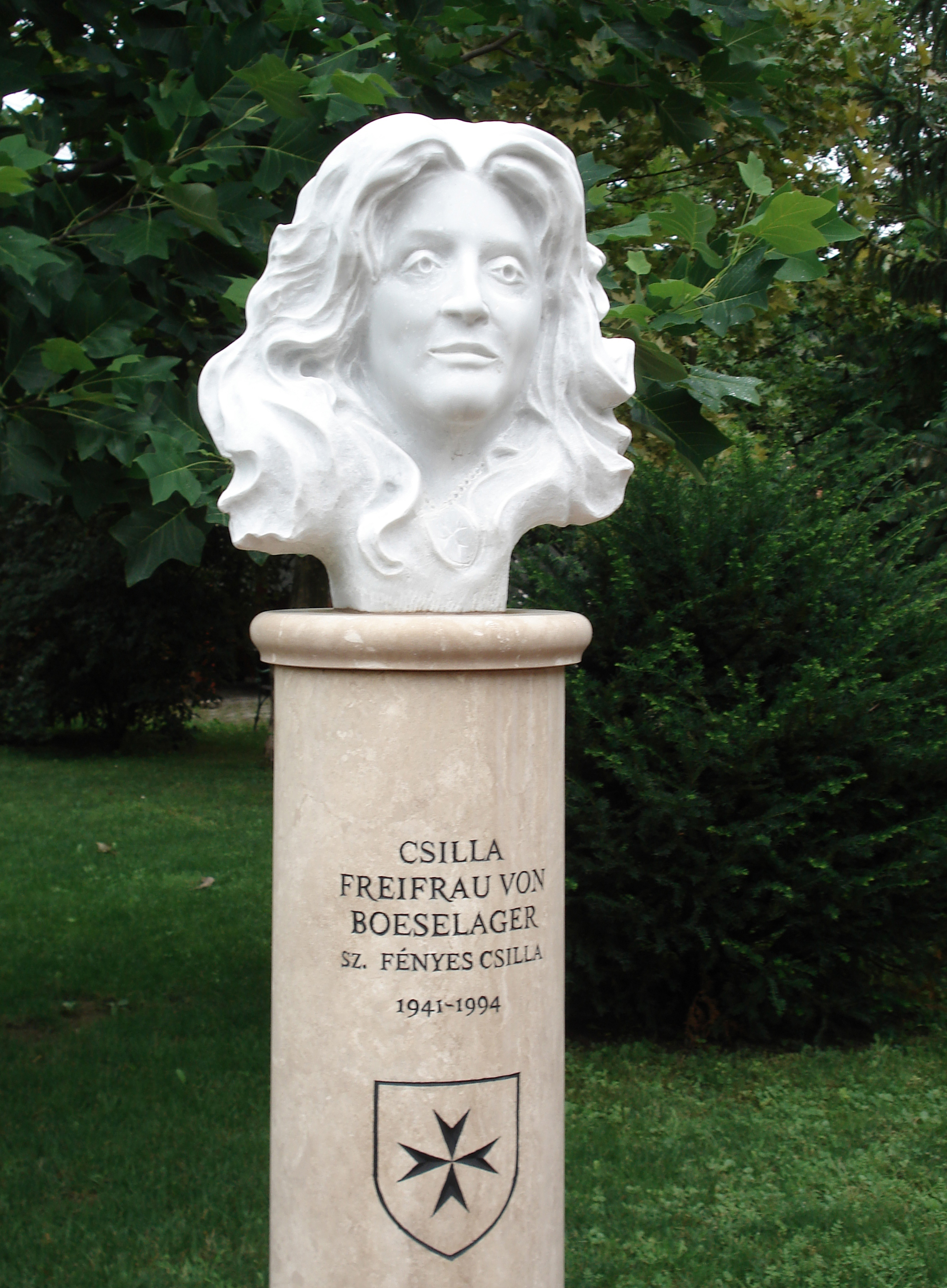
Csilla von Boeselager

Csilla Freifrau von Boeselager (May 17, 1941 in Budapest, Kingdom of Hungary – February 23, 1994, in Arnsberg-Voßwinkel North Rhine-Westphalia, Germany) was a Baroness who founded the Hungarian Maltese Charity Organisation in Germany (German: Ungarischer Malteser Caritas Dienst), and initiated the foundation of the Magyar Máltai Szeretetszolgálat (MMSz) in Hungary. She was a Dame of Malta.

== Biography ==
She was born Csilla Fényes de Dengelegh, in a Hungarian noble family. Her father was the engineer Ivan Fényes de Dengelegh, and her mother was Marianna Zrobay de Zboró. After World War II, she and her family escaped to Venezuela from Hungary.

She graduated from Vassar College, Poughkeepsie, New York, USA, in 1961, with a major in chemistry. Following graduation, she worked at American Cyanamid in Connecticut, marketing for a German chemical company.

After moving to Germany, she married Baron Wolfhard von Boeselager.

In August 1989, Csilla von Boeselager spontaneously proposed that the German Government care for thousands of refugees from the German Democratic Republic (GDR) in Budapest. The refugee camps were in Zugliget and Csillebérc.

She was active in the Malteser Hilfsdienst (MHD) from 1982 until her death at the age of 52 in 1994. Since her death, her work has been continued by the foundation "Csilla von Boeselager Stiftung - Osteuropahilfe", which brings help to six countries in Eastern Europe (Hungary, Serbia, Romania, Poland and Ukraine). www.boeselager-osteuropahilfe.de

Her sister, Ildikó Fényes is the president of the Federation of Latin American Hungarian Organizations (Latin-amerikai Magyar Szervezetek Országos Szövetsége), and has lived in Venezuela since the end of the Second World War.
