= Georg von Boeselager =

German noble and army officer (1915–1944)

- Born: 25 August 1915; Kassel, Kingdom of Prussia
- Died: 27 August 1944 (aged 29); Łomża, German-occupied Poland
- Relatives: Philipp von Boeselager
- Military career
- Allegiance: Nazi Germany
- Service years: 1934–1944
- Rank: Oberst
- Conflicts: Invasion of Poland; Battle of France; Eastern Front; Nazi security warfare
- Awards: Knight's Cross of the Iron Cross with Oak Leaves and Swords

Georg von Boeselager (25 August 1915 – 27 August 1944) was a German nobleman and an officer in the Wehrmacht of Nazi Germany, who led the Nazi security warfare operations in the Army Group Centre Rear Area on the Eastern Front, calling for extreme measures, including deporting all males in "gang-infested areas" and shooting those who remained.

Along with his younger brother Philipp von Boeselager, he was a co-conspirator in the 1944 20 July Plot to assassinate Adolf Hitler. Soon after the plot failed, Boeselager was killed in action and was posthumously awarded the Knight's Cross of the Iron Cross with Oak Leaves and Swords.

== Early life ==
Boeselager was born near Kassel into the noble Boeselager family. After enlisting in the army in 1934, he trained with a cavalry regiment. He became an officer in 1936 and in March 1939, was promoted to First Lieutenant. Boeselager took part in the Invasion of Poland and was awarded the Iron Cross 2nd Class. For his actions in the Battle of France (the bridging of the Seine near Les Andelys on 13 June 1940), he was awarded the Iron Cross 1st Class. The following January, he won the Knight's Cross of the Iron Cross. By July, he had been promoted to captain.

In Operation Barbarossa, Boeselager's company performed reconnaissance for the double-pronged sweep around Brest-Litovsk to take Białystok and Minsk, seized bridgeheads over the Neman and Daugava rivers, and participated in the Battle of Moscow. He was awarded the Knight's Cross with Oak leaves on 31 December 1941. He was then posted as instructor at the "School for Shock Troops" in Krampnitz. While there, Boeselager became acquainted with members of the military resistance to Hitler's regime, who realised the war was not going well.

== Nazi security warfare in Soviet Union ==
Boeselager took part in Nazi security warfare (Bandenbekämpfung, "bandit fighting") operations conducted within the territory of the Soviet Union under the control of the Army Group Centre Rear Area. On 23 June 1943, as commander of Cavalry Regiment Mitte (Centre) he sent a report to Henning von Tresckow regarding tactics of partisans and ways to reduce "risk of gangs", including his ideas on the subject; in the report he wrote:

It is impossible for a German soldier to distinguish between partisans and non-partisans... The regiment's view is that the area must be subdivided into a) pacified areas, b) areas threatened by gangs, c) gang infested areas. In areas threatened by gangs the men should be permitted to leave town and work only in groups; all males passing through such areas alone or in small groups must be shot or imprisoned at once... The bandit infested area must be swept clean of all males. Up to specific point in time, males up to the age of 50 will be seized and turned over to the economic office as laborers. After the deadline, men in this area will be shot.

Tresckow received Boeselager's proposals and on 27 June he personally sent copies of Boeselager's ideas to all the armies within Army Group Centre, High Command of the Army and the Commanding Officer of the Eastern Troops. These ideas were eventually implemented and far exceeded in the directive from Heinrich Himmler (as chief of Bandenkampf, literally: "bandit fighting") of 10 July 1943: "Gang-infested areas of northern Ukraine and the middle region of Russia are to be cleansed of all of its inhabitants".

== The plot to kill Hitler ==
After an audience with Field Marshal Günther von Kluge, commander of Army Group Centre, Boeselager was assigned as Deputy Commander, Cavalry Regiments Centre, a freestanding cavalry force fighting on the Eastern Front. Boeselager made frequent trips to confer with Kluge, sometimes flying along with the field marshal's staff on his transport plane.

According to a post-war account by Fabian von Schlabrendorff, at a 1943 field conference, the feasibility of an assassination of German dictator Adolf Hitler was discussed among some of the officers present, including Henning von Tresckow and Boeselager. After being wounded in February 1944, Boeselager was assigned in June to a rear echelon squadron.

Boeselager was dispatched by Tresckow to urge his old commander, Kluge, to change his strategy and to join the conspiracy against Hitler. Kluge was now Commander-in-Chief in the West. Tresckow wanted Kluge to open the front in the West, begin negotiations for peace with the British and the Americans, and transfer units to the Eastern Front to fight the Soviets. Hitler would be eliminated. As Tresckow envisioned it, Kluge would arrange for the former's transfer so that he could help consolidate the coup. However, Kluge declined to participate in the plot or any planning. Boeselager continued to work with Tresckow and helped Wessel von Freytag-Loringhoven in procuring the British Hexogen plastic explosive and other parts used in the bomb meant to kill Hitler (a fact that his friends who were tortured by Hitler's security services never revealed).

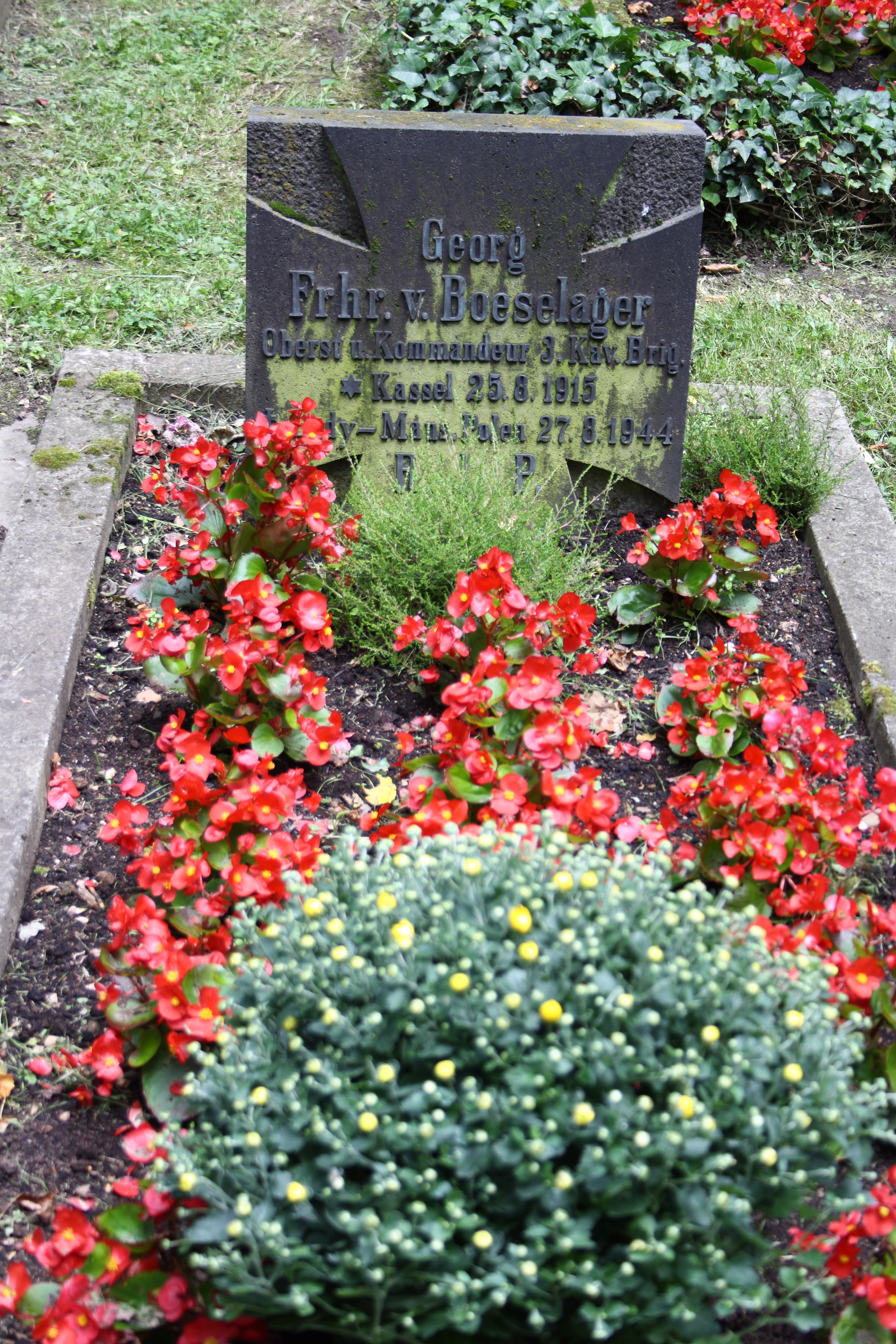

Boeselager's younger brother, Philipp von Boeselager, later claimed that he and his brother began marching their columns on Berlin on 20 July, in support of the plot, but hearing of the plot failure, turned around and thus were not implicated in the plot. In a review of the book written by Philipp about their experiences in the resistance to Hitler, the historian István Deák expressed doubts whether Philipp's claimed cavalry ride west actually took place, but concluded of Georg and the other co-conspirators involved in the plot:

And so they conspired to save Germany from its leaders and its population. They sensed that the cause of their caste was hopeless, but they wanted to go down in dignity. In this, they succeeded. When they died, Germany lost some of its more admirable sons.

Boeselager was killed in action leading an assault against a heavily fortified Soviet position near Łomża on the Narew River on 27 August 1944. Two days later, he was posthumously promoted to Oberst and awarded the Knight's Cross with Oak Leaves and Swords.

== Awards ==
- Iron Cross (1939) 2nd Class (15 October 1939) & 1st Class (13 June 1940)
- Knight's Cross of the Iron Cross with Oak Leaves and Swords
  - Knight's Cross on 18 January 1941 as Oberleutnant and chief of the 1./Divisions-Aufklärungs-Abteilung 6
  - Oak Leaves on 31 December 1941 as Rittmeister and chief of the 1./Divisions-Aufklärungs-Abteilung 6
  - Swords on 28 November 1944 (posthumously) as Oberstleutnant and leader of the 3. Kavallerie-Brigade
