= Outline of San Marino =

Overview of and topical guide to San Marino

The Flag of San Marino

The Coat of arms of San Marino

The location of San Marino

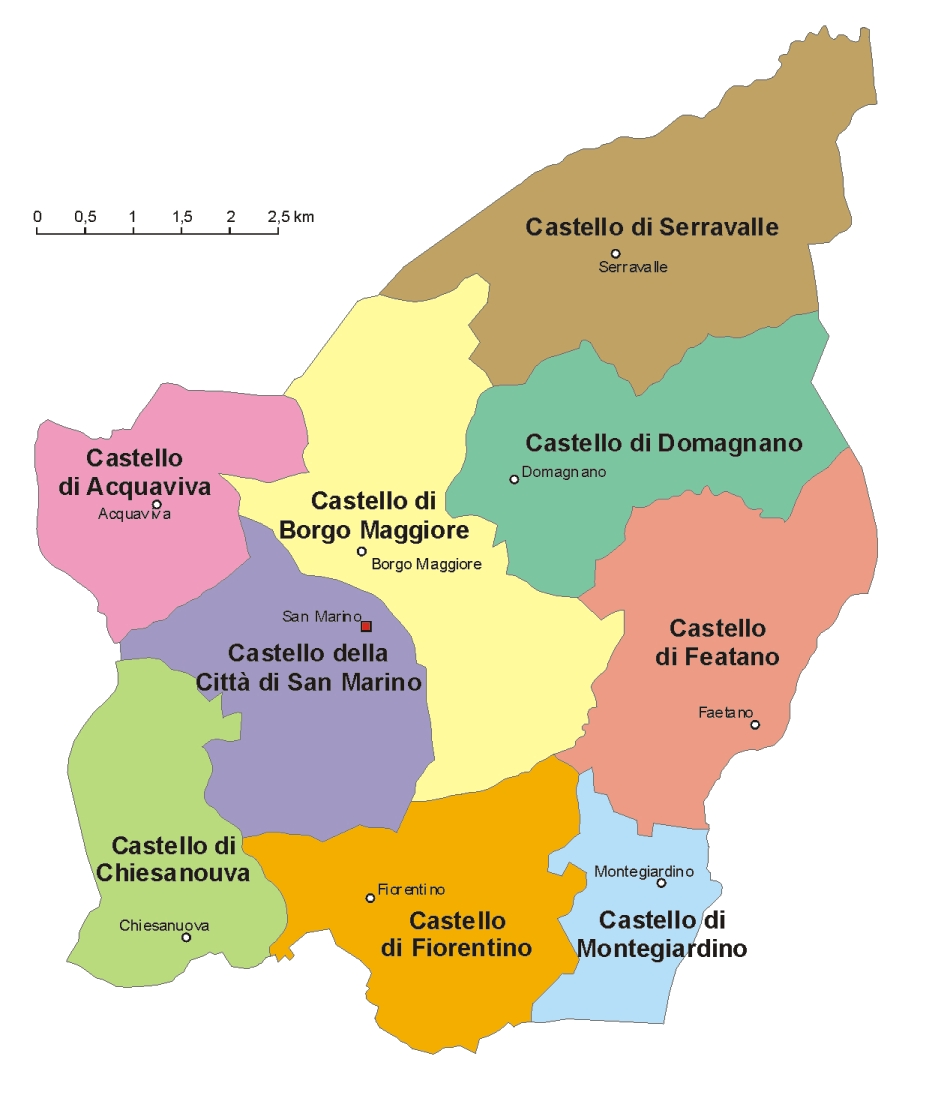
An enlargeable map of the Most Serene Republic of San Marino

The following outline is provided as an overview of and topical guide to San Marino:

San Marino – small sovereign country located in the Apennine Mountains on the Italian Peninsula in Southern Europe. San Marino is a landlocked enclave, surrounded by Italy. One of the European microstates, San Marino has the smallest population of all the members of the Council of Europe and the 12th highest GDP per capita in the world.

San Marino claims to be the oldest constitutional republic in the world, founded on 3 September 301, by Marinus, a Christian stonemason fleeing the religious persecution of Roman Emperor Diocletian. San Marino's constitution, dating back to 1600, is the world's oldest written constitution still in effect.

== General reference ==
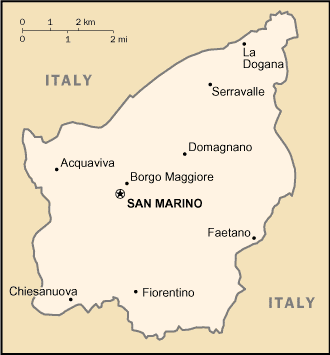
An enlargeable basic map of San Marino

- Pronunciation:
- Common English country name: San Marino
- Official English country name: The Republic of San Marino
- Common endonym(s):
- Official endonym(s):
- Adjectival(s): Sammarinese
- Demonym(s): Sammarinese
- Etymology: Name of San Marino
- ISO country codes: SM, SMR, 674
- ISO region codes: See ISO 3166-2:SM
- Internet country code top-level domain: .sm

== Geography of San Marino ==
Geography of San Marino

- San Marino is: a landlocked country and a European microstate
- Location:
  - Eastern Hemisphere
  - Northern Hemisphere
    - Eurasia
      - Europe (outline)
        - Southern Europe
          - Italian Peninsula
            - Surrounded by Italy
  - Time zone: Central European Time (UTC+01), Central European Summer Time (UTC+02)
  - Extreme points of San Marino
    - High: Monte Titano 755 m (2,477 ft)
    - Low: Ausa River 55 m (180 ft)
  - Land boundaries: Italy 39 km (Italy-San Marino border)
  - Coastline: none
- Population of San Marino: 30,800 (January 1, 2008) - 206th most populous country
  - Sammarinese
- Area of San Marino: 61 km^{2}
- Atlas of San Marino

=== Environment of San Marino ===
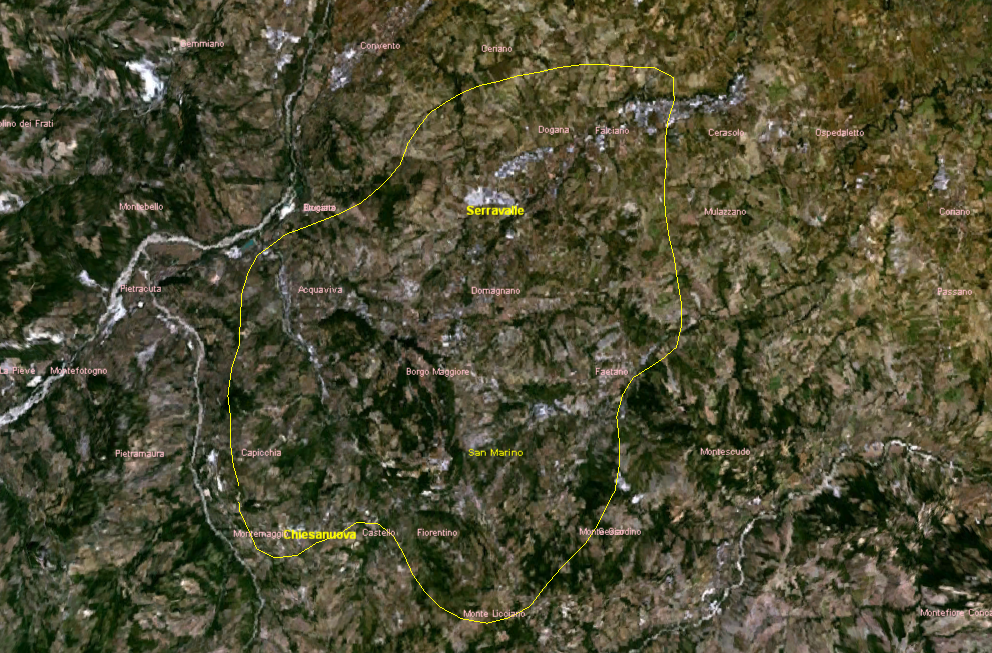
An enlargeable satellite image of San Marino

- Climate of San Marino
- Geology of San Marino
- Protected areas of San Marino
- Wildlife of San Marino
  - Fauna of San Marino
    - Birds of San Marino
    - Mammals of San Marino

==== Natural geographic features of San Marino ====
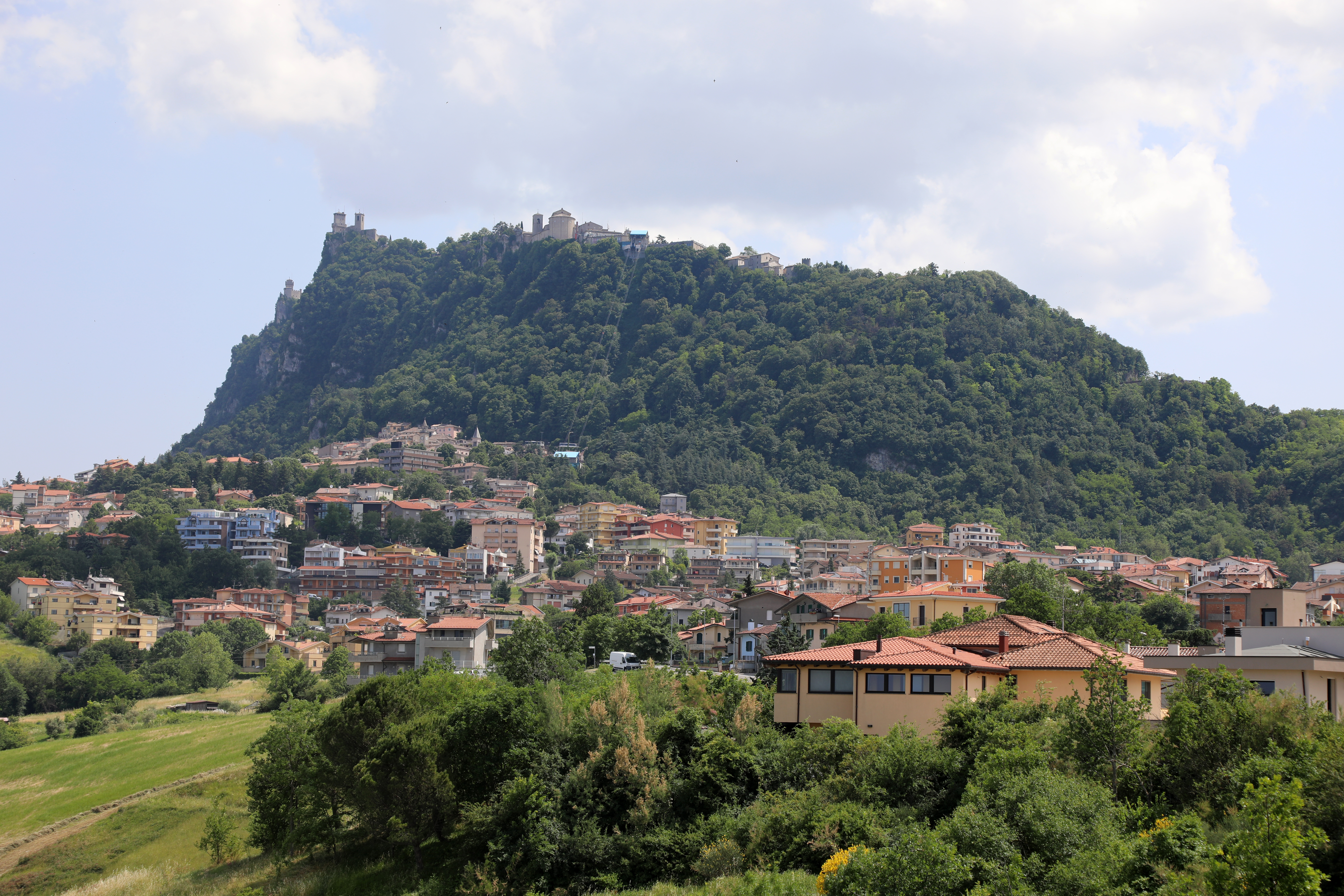
Monte Titano and the three fortresses on top of it can be seen from many kilometers away

- Mountains of San Marino
  - Monte Titano
- Rivers of San Marino
  - Ausa (river)
  - Cando (river)
  - Fiumicello (river)
  - San Marino (river)
- World Heritage Sites in San Marino: None

=== Demography of San Marino ===
Demographics of San Marino

== Government and politics of San Marino ==
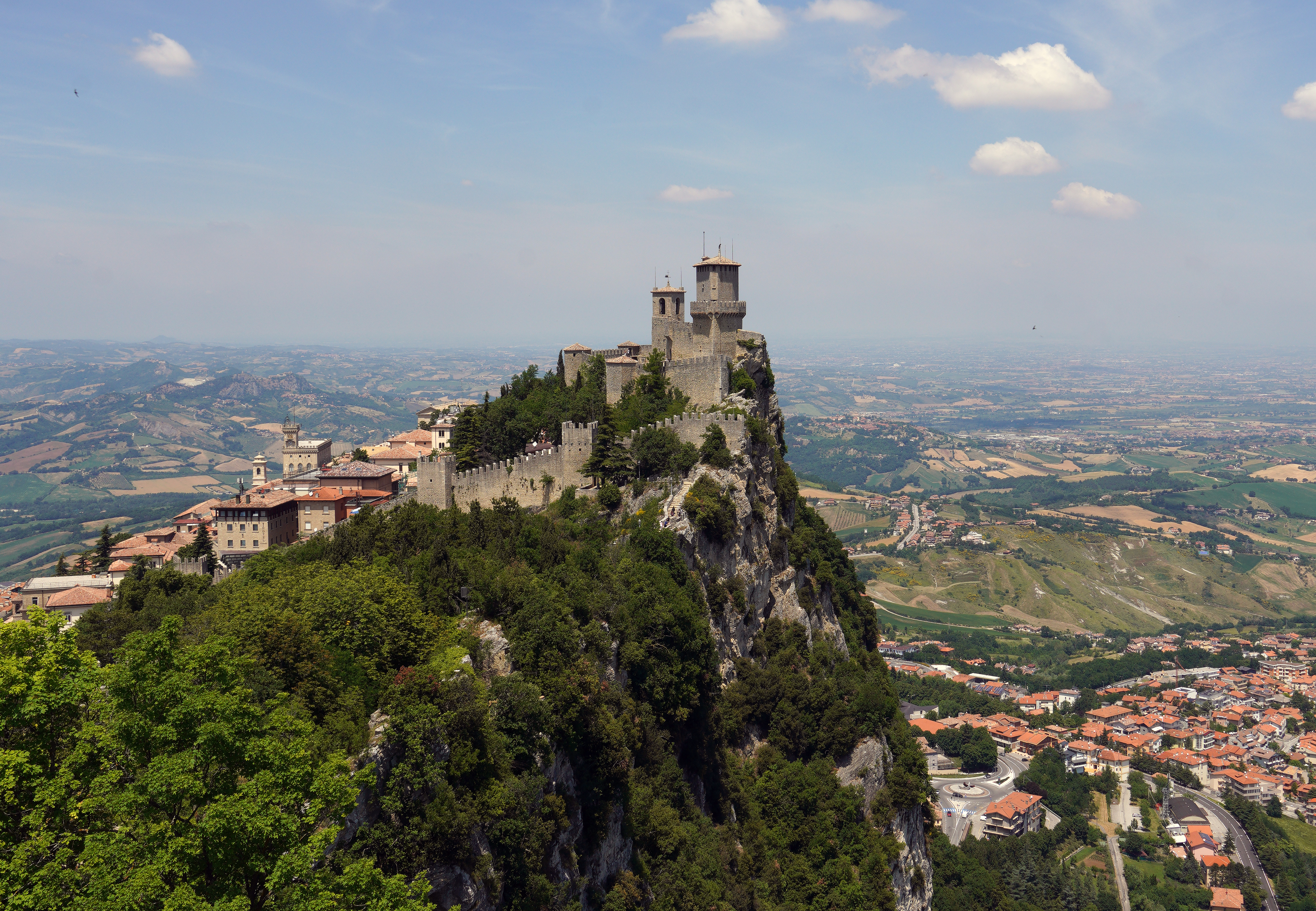
Fortress of Guaita, the oldest and the most famous of the three towers constructed on Monte Titano

Politics of San Marino

- Form of government:
- Capital of San Marino: San Marino
- Elections in San Marino
- Political parties in San Marino

=== Branches of the government of San Marino ===
Government of San Marino

==== Executive branch of the government of San Marino ====
- Captains Regent
- Congress of State

==== Legislative branch of the government of San Marino ====
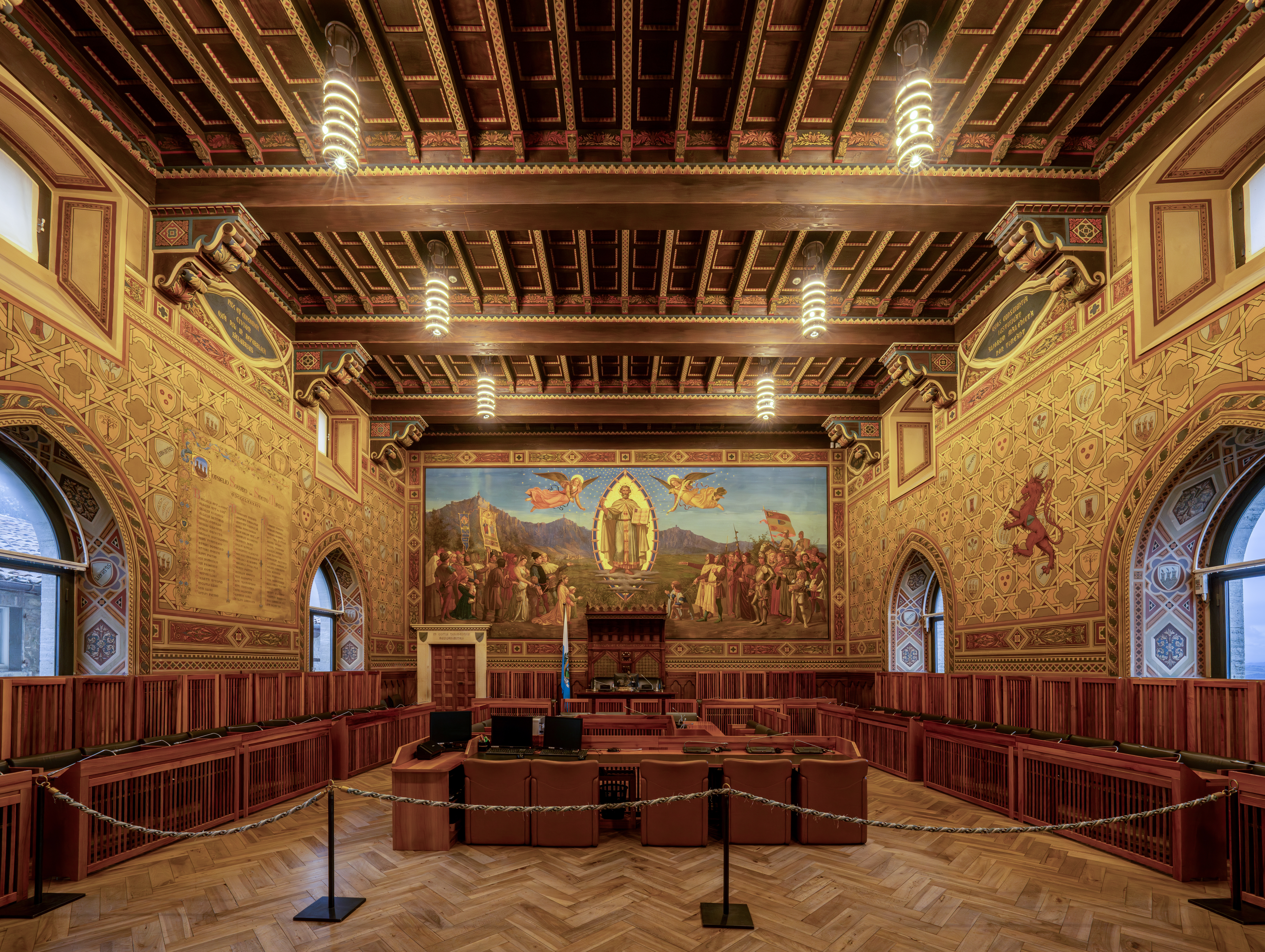
Chamber of the Grand and General Council

Grand and General Council

==== Judicial branch of the government of San Marino ====
Judiciary of San Marino

=== Foreign relations of San Marino ===
Foreign relations of San Marino

- Diplomatic missions in San Marino
- Diplomatic missions of San Marino
- Italy–San Marino relations
- San Marino–Serbia relations
- San Marino–United Kingdom relations
- San Marino–United States relations

==== International organization membership ====
The Most Serene Republic of San Marino is a member of:

- Council of Europe (CE)
- Food and Agriculture Organization (FAO)
- International Bank for Reconstruction and Development (IBRD)
- International Civil Aviation Organization (ICAO)
- International Criminal Court (ICCt)
- International Criminal Police Organization (Interpol)
- International Federation of Red Cross and Red Crescent Societies (IFRCS)
- International Labour Organization (ILO)
- International Maritime Organization (IMO)
- International Monetary Fund (IMF)
- International Olympic Committee (IOC)
- International Organization for Migration (IOM) (observer)
- International Red Cross and Red Crescent Movement (ICRM)
- International Telecommunication Union (ITU)
- International Trade Union Confederation (ITUC)
- Inter-Parliamentary Union (IPU)
- Organization for Security and Cooperation in Europe (OSCE)
- Organisation for the Prohibition of Chemical Weapons (OPCW)
- Unione Latina
- United Nations (UN)
- United Nations Conference on Trade and Development (UNCTAD)
- United Nations Educational, Scientific, and Cultural Organization (UNESCO)
- Universal Postal Union (UPU)
- World Federation of Trade Unions (WFTU)
- World Health Organization (WHO)
- World Intellectual Property Organization (WIPO)
- World Tourism Organization (UNWTO)

=== Law and order in San Marino ===
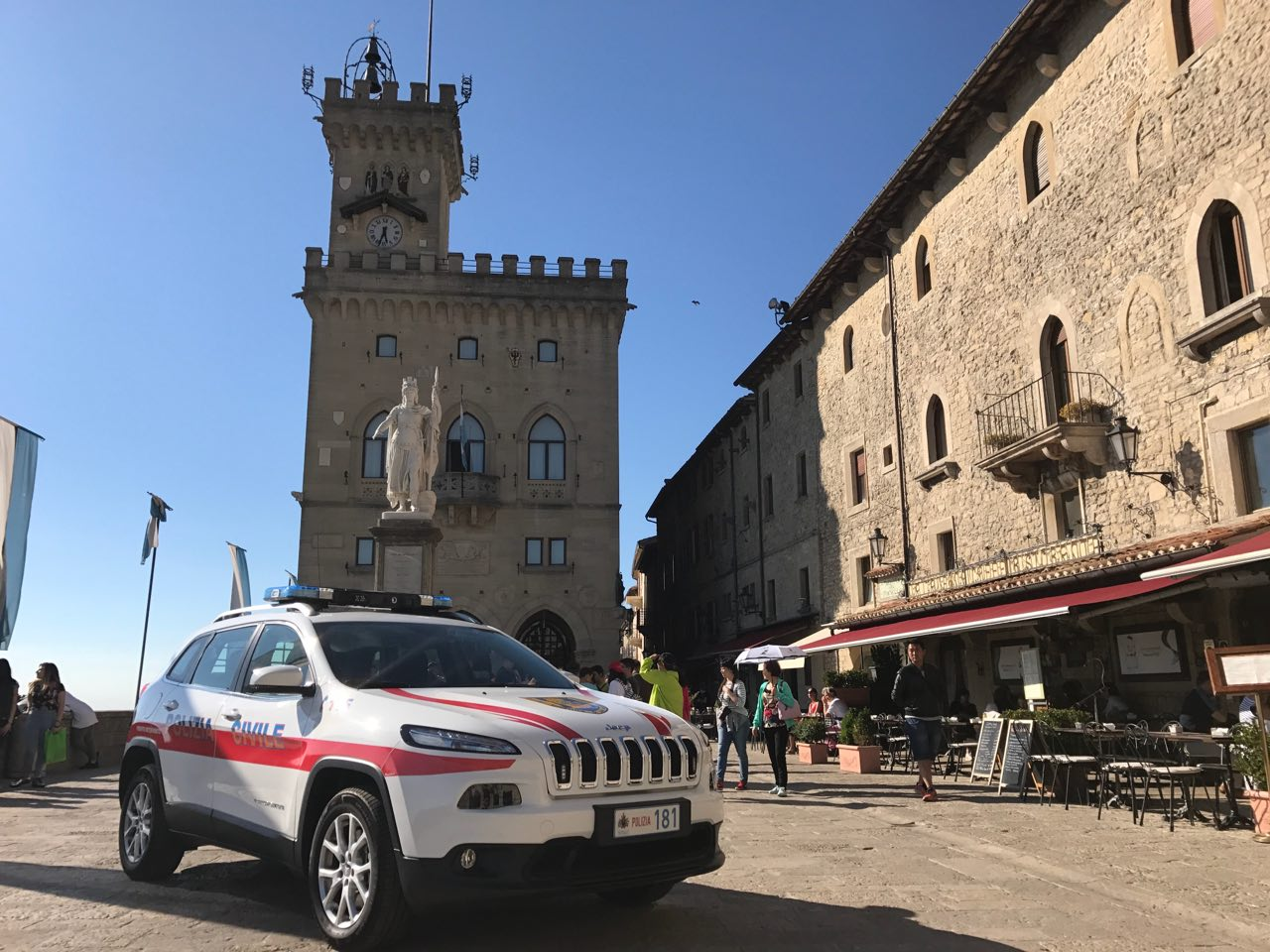
Vehicle of the Civil Police

Law of San Marino

- Capital punishment in San Marino
- Constitution of San Marino
- Human rights in San Marino
  - Abortion in San Marino
  - LGBT rights in San Marino
  - Freedom of religion in San Marino
- Law enforcement in San Marino
  - Carcere dei Cappuccini
  - Civil Police

=== Military of San Marino ===
Military of San Marino

- Military ranks of San Marino

== History of San Marino ==
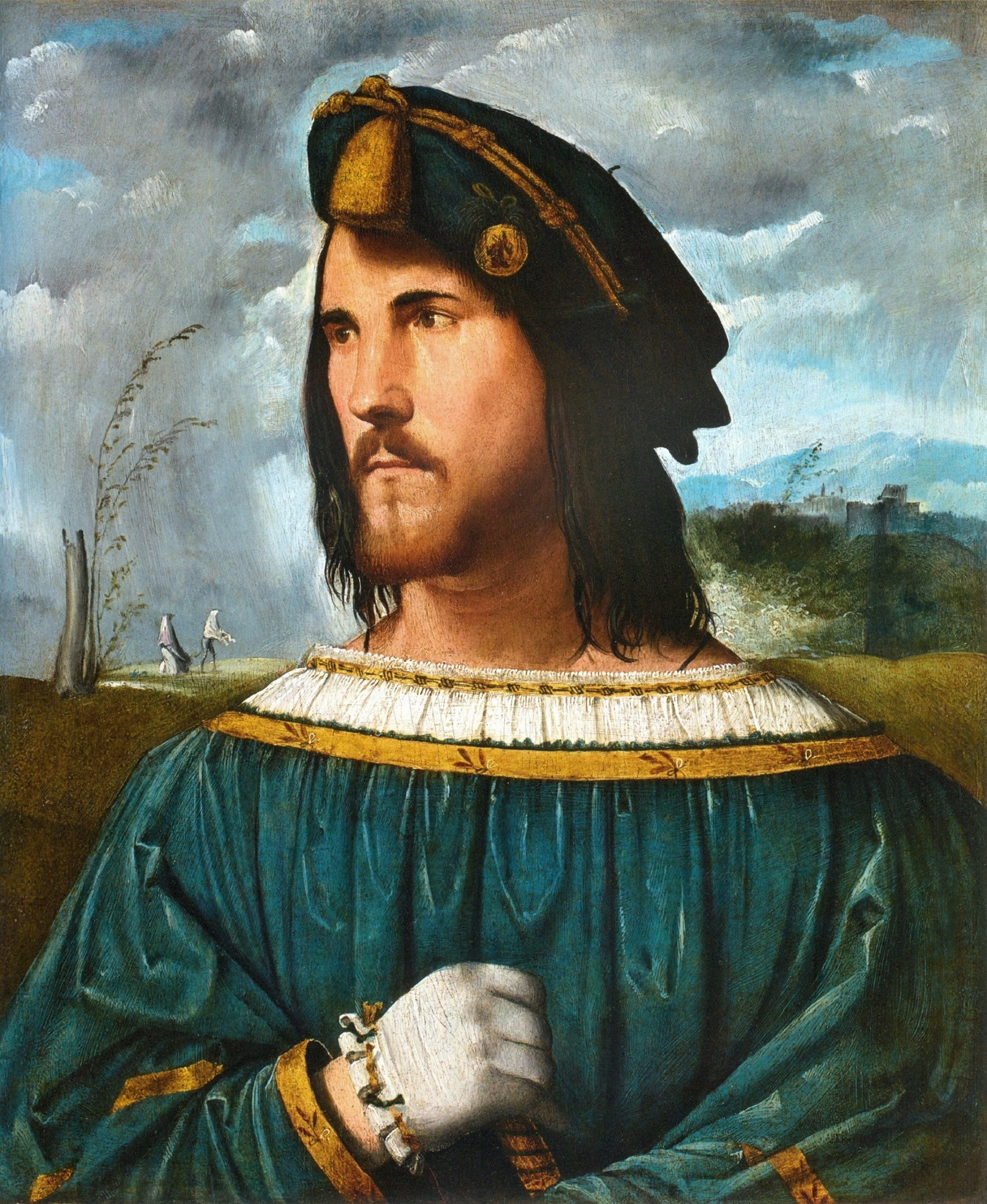
Cesare Borgia briefly took control of San Marino in 1503

History of San Marino

- Battle of San Marino

== Culture of San Marino ==
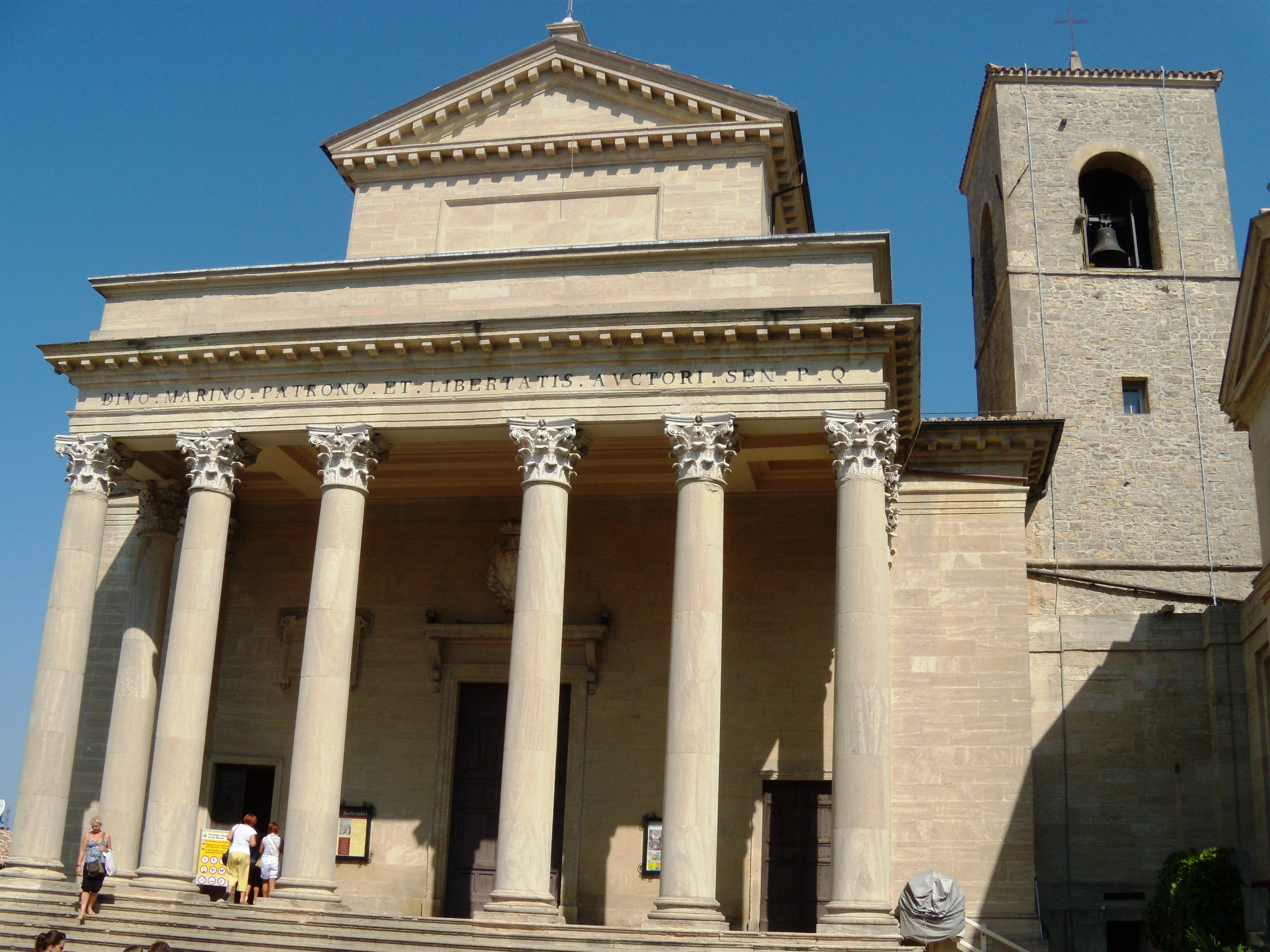
Basilica di San Marino, the main church of the capital city

Culture of San Marino

- Architecture of San Marino
- Art in San Marino
  - Art in San Marino
  - Cinema of San Marino
  - Literature of San Marino
  - Music of San Marino
  - Theatre in San Marino
- Cuisine of San Marino
  - Sammarinese wine
  - Torta Tre Monti
- Festivals in San Marino
- Languages of San Marino
- Media in San Marino
  - Newspapers in San Marino
  - Television in San Marino
- National symbols of San Marino
  - Coat of arms of San Marino
  - Flag of San Marino
  - National anthem of San Marino
- People of San Marino
- Public holidays in San Marino
- Religion in San Marino
  - Christianity in San Marino
  - Islam in San Marino
  - Judaism in San Marino
- World Heritage Sites in San Marino: None

=== Sports in San Marino ===
Sports in San Marino

- Football in San Marino
- San Marino at the Olympics

== Economy and infrastructure of San Marino ==
Economy of San Marino

- Economic rank, by nominal GDP (2007): 166th (one hundred and sixty sixth)
- Agriculture in San Marino
- Banking in San Marino
  - Central Bank of San Marino
  - National Bank of San Marino
- Communications in San Marino
  - Internet in San Marino
  - Poste San Marino
  - Telecom Italia San Marino

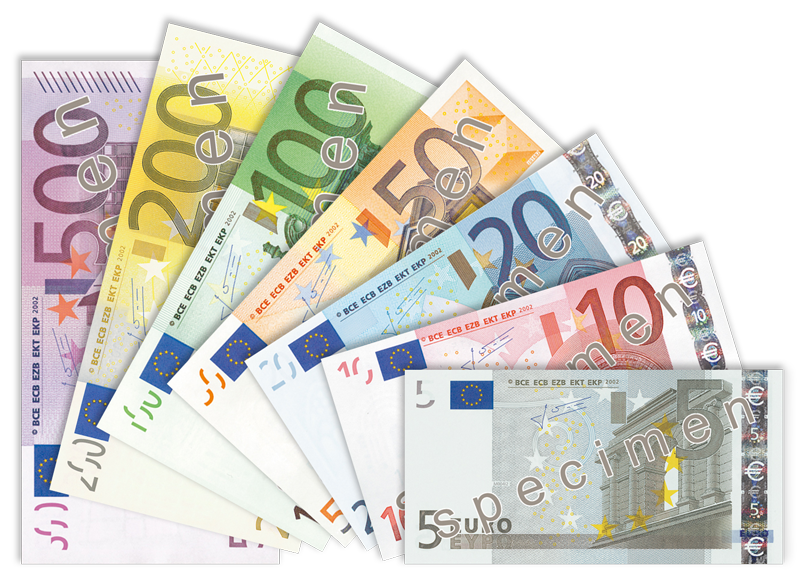
Euro banknotes

- Currency of San Marino: Euro (see also: Euro topics)
- Sammarinese euro coins
- Previous currency: Sammarinese lira
  - ISO 4217: EUR
- Energy in San Marino
- Health care in San Marino
- Tourism in San Marino
  - Museums in San Marino
  - Visa policy of San Marino
- Transport in San Marino
  - Aerial cable car
  - Airports in San Marino
  - Rail transport in San Marino
  - Roads in San Marino

== Education in San Marino ==
Education in San Marino

- Scuola Superiore di Studi Storici di San Marino

== See also ==
- List of international rankings
- Member state of the United Nations
- Outline of geography
