= Tourism in San Marino =

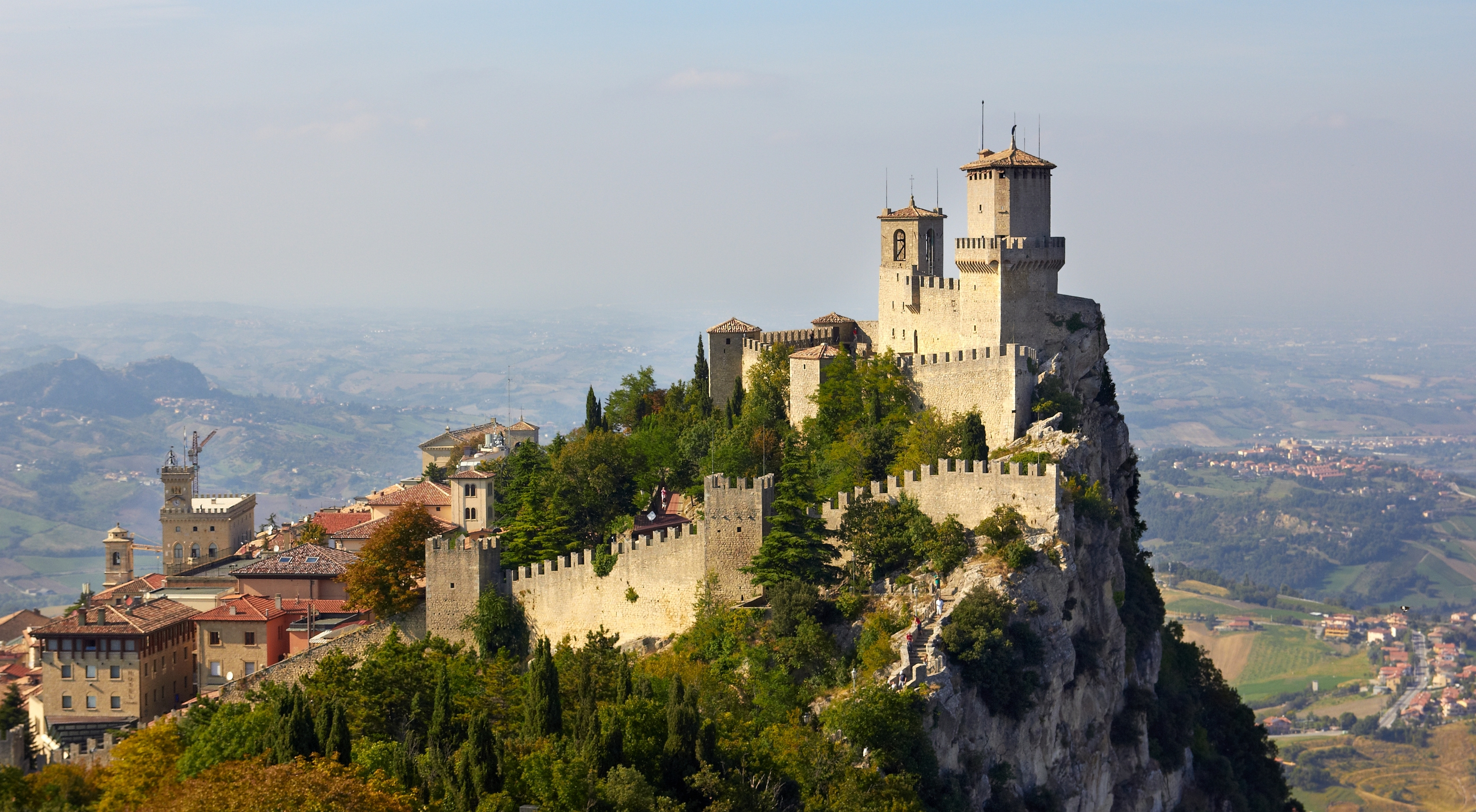
Fortress of Guaita, located on Monte Titano, San Marino.

Tourism in San Marino, known also as the Most Serene Republic of San Marino (Italian: Serenissima Repubblica di San Marino) is an integral element of the economy within the microstate. The tourism sector contributes a large part of San Marino's GDP, with approximately 2 million tourists visiting per year.

Tourism is among the republic's most important sectors due to its significant contribution to the GDP. The rate of tourists has increased in recent years, as visitors are drawn to the landscape, cuisine and architectural sights of the mountainous microstate. San Marino attracts approximately two million tourists a year, of which 1,822,000 derived from Europe in 2018. In comparison with other European microstates (Andorra, Malta, Monaco and Vatican City), as of 2018 San Marino attracts the fewest tourists.

Geographically, San Marino is an independent microstate surrounded by the Italian Republic. The enclave state is situated in central Italy on the northeastern edge of the Apennine Mountains, and is completely landlocked. However it is in close proximity to the Adriatic coastline, accessed through the Emilia-Romagna region. In the summer season, many tourists flock to San Marino for its vicinity to the beaches of the Adriatic coastline. Additionally people visit the republic to encounter the culture and cuisine, as well as to visit the many historical monuments, churches, and castles.

Most tourists who visit San Marino are Italian, usually consisting of people who come to spend holidays in the Romagna riviera and decide to spend a half-day or at most a night in the country. Even though there are only a small number of non-Italian foreigners who visit the country, they still are vital to the Sammarinese economy. There are no border formalities with Italy. However, at the tourist office visitors can purchase souvenir stamps which are officially canceled inside their passports.

The City of San Marino itself contains most attractions. The city is perched on a hill with regular parking areas for cars and buses. The City historic centre itself is only a pedestrian zone that has mostly gift shops and food venues on both sides.

== Land and climate ==
San Marino is located on the Italian peninsula and consequently experiences the same weather patterns as the Italian state. San Marino has a Mediterranean climate of hot, dry summers and wet winters. However, as it is located in the vicinity of the Tuscan-Emilian Apennines the climate is often more harsh, with very hot, especially humid summers and very cold winters.

== History ==
The commercial tourism sector in the Republic of San Marino originates primarily from the early nineteenth century onwards. Prior to the infrastructure improvements of the nineteenth century, the region never aroused great interest for a number of reasons. These included the fact that the state was quite impoverished and lacked the infrastructure to develop accessible connections with Italy. During the late nineteenth century, the microstate embarked on a process of modernisation through the restructuring of the City of San Marino’s historic centre. This was marked by the construction of a new seat of government (Italian: Palazzo Pubblico) that was inaugurated in 1894. Although the construction caused a fiscal strain on the Republic, the Palazzo Pubblico remains a major tourist attraction within the microstate.

The rates of tourists gradually increased in the successive years, facilitated by improvements to transportation and infrastructure in San Marino during the nineteenth and early twentieth centuries. The tourism industry in the region developed in great part following World War II, as the Italian economic “boom” brought developments to infrastructure that allowed for increased commercial tourism.

== Visitor attractions ==
The main tourist attractions in the most popular destination in the country, the City of San Marino, and the rest of the nation are:

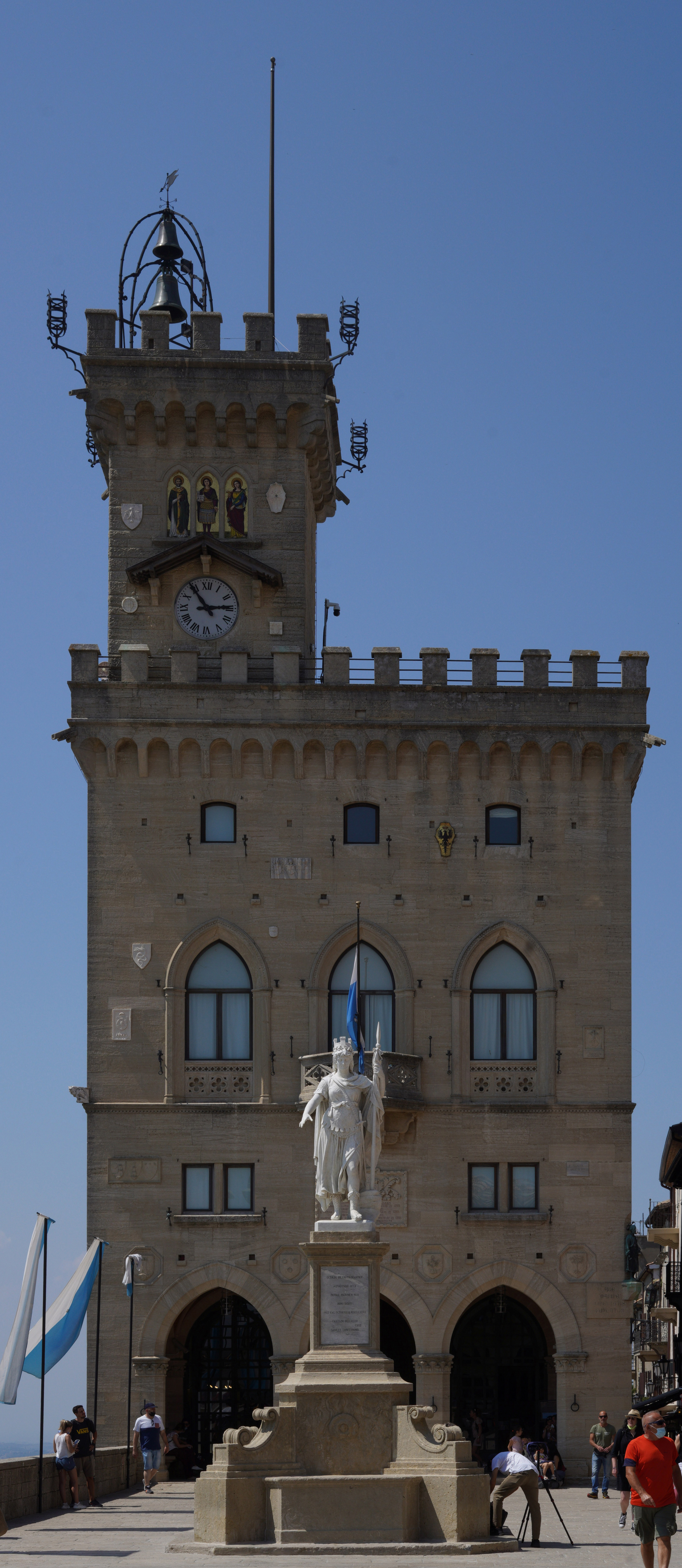
The Palazzo Pubblico at daytime

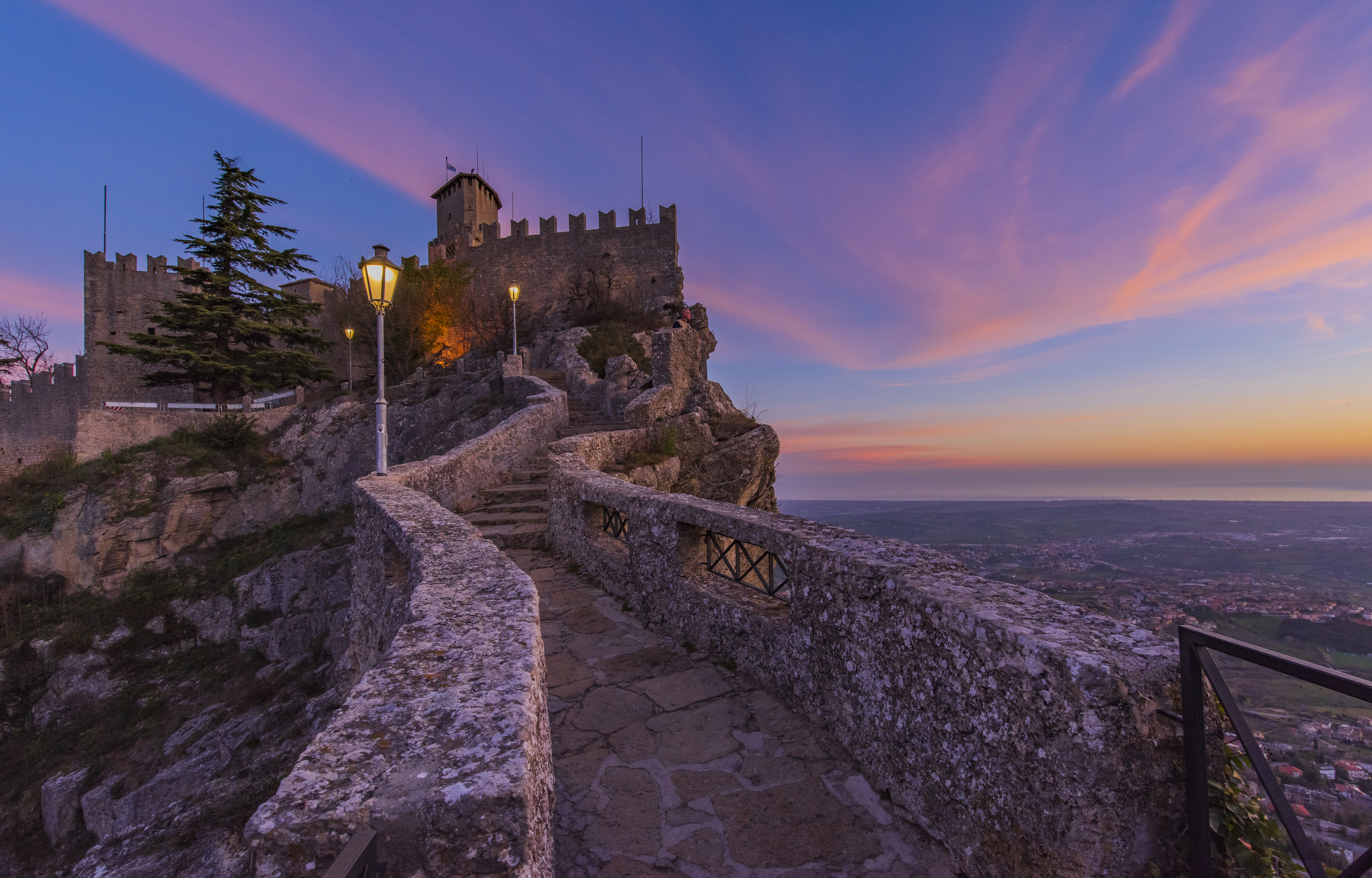
The Fortress of Guaita, San Marino

=== Palazzo Pubblico/Piazza della Libertà ===
The Palazzo Pubblico (alternatively, the town hall) is located in Piazza della Libertà in San Marino's historic city centre. The present building stands where the old town hall, named Domus Magna Comunis, built at the close of the fourteenth century, once stood. Following centuries of continued restorations, the original building was demolished in 1884 and inaugurated one decade later. The Roman architect Francesco Azzurri, who designed the Palazzo Pubblico, developed a design that resembled the simple, severe style of thirteenth and fourteenth century municipal halls. The modern Palazzo Pubblico encompasses the parliament of San Marino, including the Great and General Council, as well as the government and parliamentary committees. The Palazzo Pubblico is situated in the Piazza della Libertà, named for the Statue of Liberty found at the centre of the piazza. The neoclassical architecture attracts many tourists, especially the white carrara marble “Statua della Libertà”.

=== Basilica di San Marino ===
The Basilica di San Marino is a Catholic church located on Piazza Domus Plebis on the northeastern side of the city of San Marino. The basilica is dedicated to Saint Marinus, the patron and founder of the microstate. The current basilica was reconstructed in the neoclassical style in 1836, replacing an earlier basilica from the 7th century. The relics of Saint Marinus are enshrined in the current basilica.

=== Museo di Stato ===
The state museum of San Marino holds artistic, archeological and numismatic artefacts. From 2001, the state museum has been housed within San Marino’s historic Palazzo Pergami-Belluzzi. It is divided into four floors and holds a combination of permanent and temporary exhibitions.

=== Monte Titano and The Three Towers of San Marino (Guaita, Cesta, and Montale) ===
The historic centre of San Marino is situated on Mount Titano. Many of the original Medieval elements of the historic centre on Mount Titano have been preserved and the site is on the UNESCO World Heritage list. The historical centre of San Marino dates back to the thirteenth century and includes many Medieval architectural features such as fortification towers, bastions, gates and walls. The city centre also comprises the Titano Theatre (dating back to the eighteenth century), the neoclassical San Marino Basilica, and convents dating from the fourteenth and sixteenth century respectively. Monte Titano covers fifty five hectares and features three Medieval towers built on its three peaks; Guaita, De La Fratta (alternatively, Cesta) and Montale.

== Visitors ==
Tourist arrivals of 2024 in %

In recent years, tourism to the region of San Marino has risen by 5.6%, with an increase from 1,888,000 tourists in 2015 to 2,000,000 in 2016. The primary visitors to the microstate come from the nation surrounding it; Italy. In 2018, tourism from Italy held the majority of the tourism market at 66.84%, a decrease of 3.16% from 2017.

In 2015, 37% of tourists to the region visited for leisure and holiday-making, while 38% visited for personal purposes. The remaining 25% of visitors travelled for the purpose of business. Although data from 2014 to 2018 conveys that all visitors to the republic arrived on land (via roads/driving), this is because San Marino is inaccessible to any other mode of transport. Between 2017 and 2018, the average overnight stay in a commercial hotel or equivalent increased from 1.69 to 1.81 nights.

== Economic impact ==
The economic impact of tourism on San Marino is visible through the significant increase in infrastructure amenable to commercial tourism. From 2015 to 2018, the number of hotels and equivalent accommodation increased from 35 to 43 establishments. In 2014, the available capacity of beds per 1,000 inhabitants peaked at 47.1.

Employment in the commercial tourism industry has remained steady at 3,500 employed individuals from 2014 to 2018. Within the industry, a recorded 700 are employed in accommodation services for hotels, while travel agencies and reservation services employ approximately 100 people. The majority work in miscellaneous tourism sectors, with the figure standing at 2,500.

== Cuisine ==
The Sammarinese cuisine boasts strong similarities to Italian cuisine, particularly that of the regions it borders; Le Marche and Emilia-Romagna. There are a number of traditional dishes that attract visitors to the microstate. The Christmas cake of honey, nuts and dried fruit, known as bustrengo in San Marino, draws visitors to the region for festive celebrations. The dessert the region is most renowned for is named the ‘torta tre monti’ (or ‘cake of the three towers’). This traditional Sammarinese cake is made from thin layers of wafer held together by a hazelnut paste and covered in dark chocolate fondant. The name of the cake derives from the three towers of Monte Titano (Guaita, Cesta and Montale) which are depicted on the flag of the microstate.

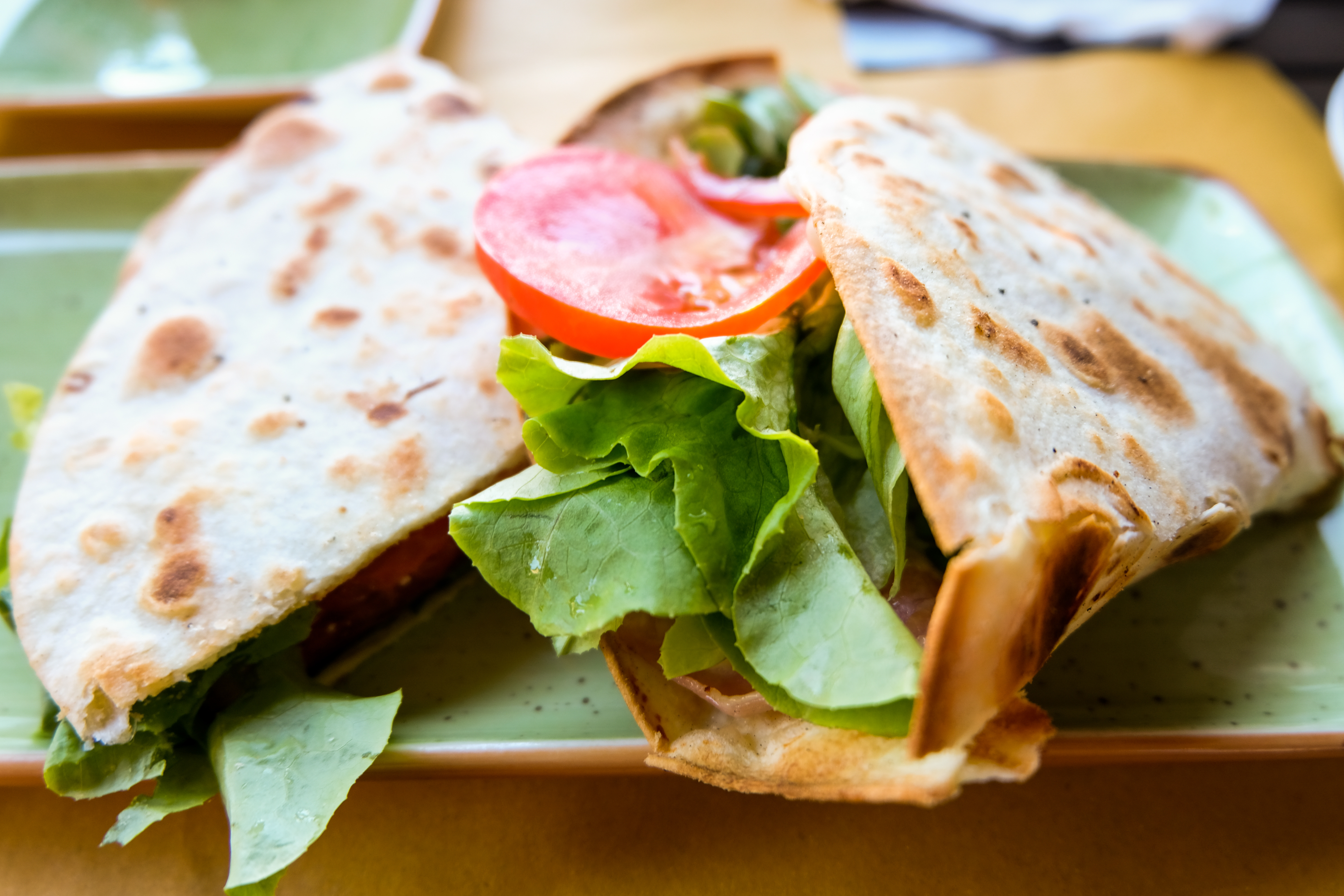
A traditional chickpea flour piadina served with salad and tomatoes, a common meal in northern Italy.

In terms of savoury dishes, the Sammarinesi are known for their traditional northeastern Apennine fare of roast rabbit with fennel, piadina (a chickpea flour flatbread) and ‘nidi di rondine’ (a handmade pasta with a name meaning ‘swallow’s nests’). The region upholds a tradition of manufacturing cheese, a major facet of northern Italian cuisine adopted from its neighbours. Much like the bordering region of Emilia-Romagna, pasta and meat dishes play a significant role in Sammarinese cuisine. Typical savoury dishes of this category include tagliatelle, lasagna, ravioli, pasta e ceci (chickpea soup), passatelli in brodo (dumplings in broth) and cotoletta alla bolognese (cutlets bolognese style). Locally produced wine is also a major part of Sammarinese cuisine. San Marino has produced wine locally for nearly two thousand years, through a unique aging process in the caves of the Apennine ranges which allows the wine to mature at an ideal temperature.

=== List of traditional savoury dishes ===
- Roast rabbit with fennel
- Piadina (chickpea flour flatbread)
- Nidi di rondine (traditional Sammarinese pasta)
- Passatelli in brodo (dumplings in broth)
- Pasta e ceci (pasta with chickpeas)
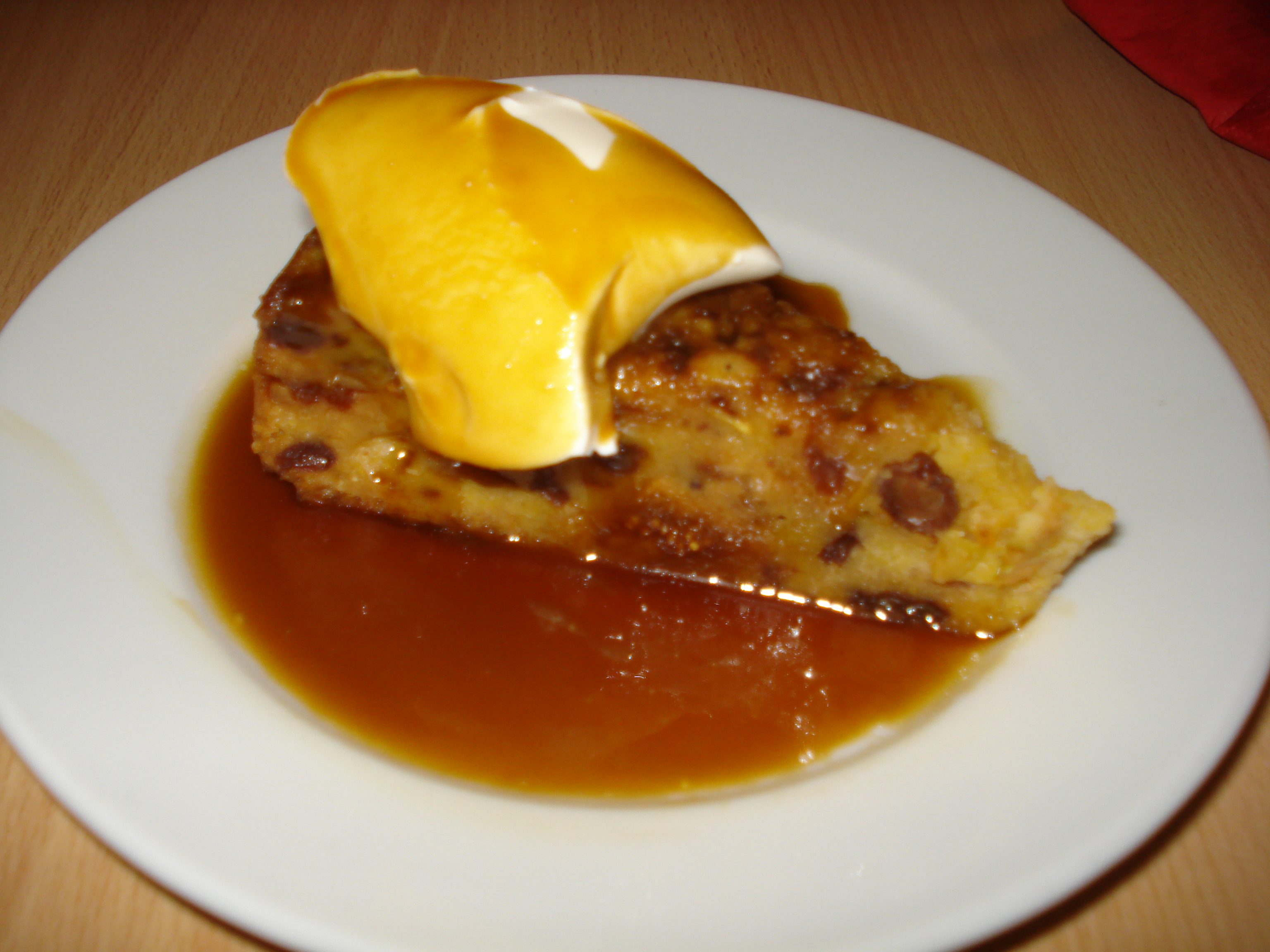
  The traditional Sammarinese Christmas cake 'Bustrengo' prepared with polenta, honey, nuts and dried fruit.
- Lasagna al forno (lasagne)
- Cappelletti in brodo (ravioli in broth)
- Cotolette alla bolognese (veal cutlets bolognese style)
- Fagioli con le cotiche (bean soup)

=== List of traditional desserts ===
- Bustrengo (Christmas cake with honey, nuts, and dried fruit)
- Cacciatello (crème caramel)
- Torta di Titano (chocolate-covered torte with liqueur)
- Zuppa di ciliege (cherries stewed in mulled wine)
- Torta Tre Monti (layered wafer cake with hazelnut paste and dark chocolate)

=== List of local Sammarinese wine ===
- Brugneto di San Marino (a fruity red wine made from Sangiovese grapes)
- Sangiovese di San Marino (a savoury red wine made from Sangiovese grapes)
- Biancale di San Marino (a dry white wine made from Biancale grapes)
- Moscato di San Marino (a sweet white wine made from Moscato grapes)
- Roncale di San Marino (a dry white wine from Ribolla grapes)
- Moscato Spumante di San Marino (a sweet, aromatic sparkling white wine made from Moscato grapes)
- Riserva Titano Vino Spumante Brut (a dry white wine made of Chardonnay grapes)
- Grilet di San Marino (a sparkling white wine of Chardonnay and Biancale grapes)

== Language ==
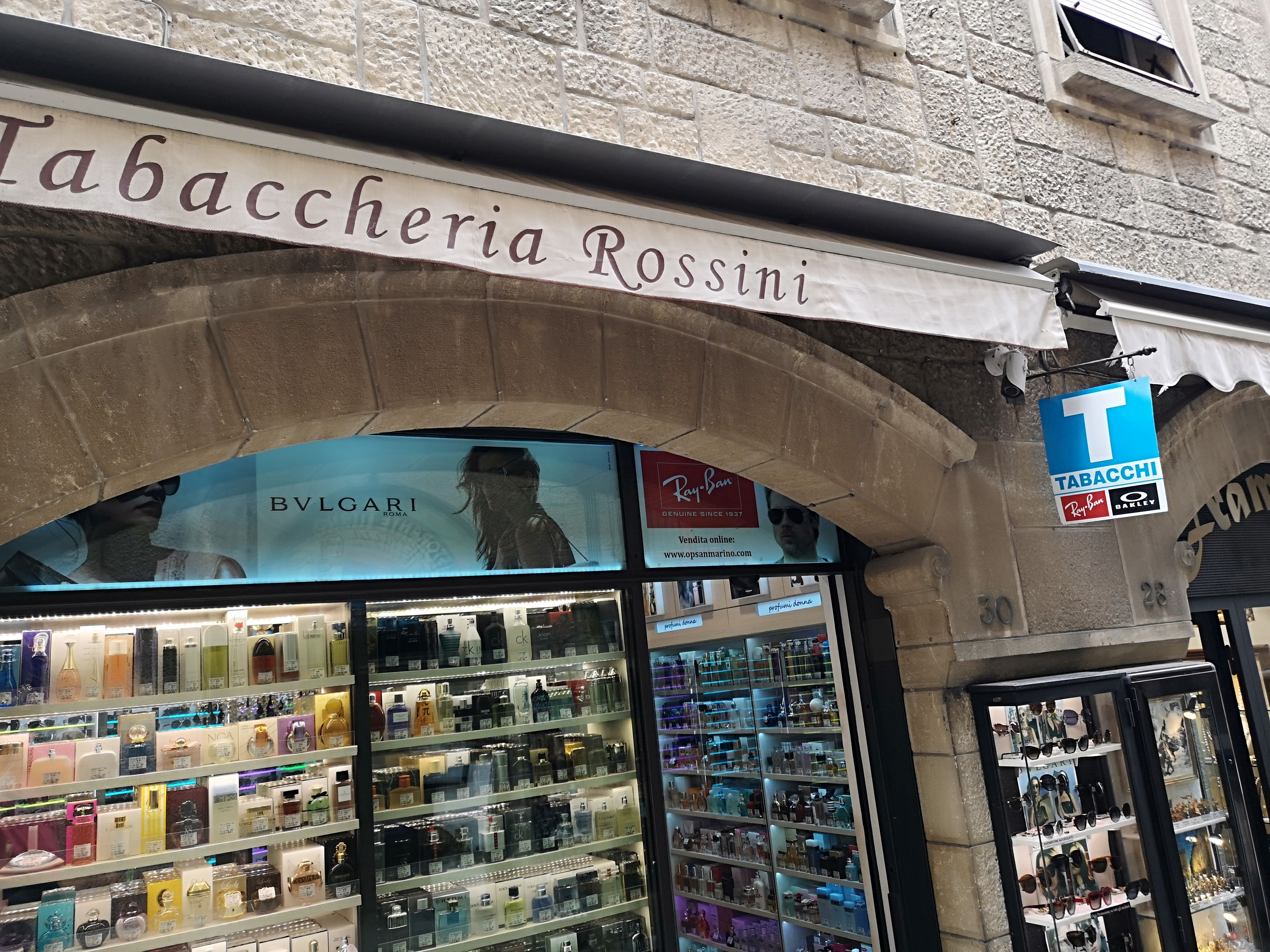
A typical tobacco shop in San Marino.

The primary language spoken in the Republic of San Marino is Italian. Common second languages of citizens include English, French, and Sammarinese (the local dialect, a distant relative of the Romagnol dialect).

== Shopping ==
Tourists are drawn to San Marino for its promise of tax-free shopping. The microstate features many stores offering luxury products, such as jewellery, perfume, and clothing. Handmade leather goods (including bags, shoes, and wallets) are also popular purchases due to the many artisan leather goods available for purchase without the 20% VAT imposed in the principality. Other items popular with visiting tourists include local wine and cigarettes.

=== Currency ===
Shopping in the state of San Marino is facilitated by the fact that the nation maintains a currency union with Italy, meaning that they use the euro like the vast majority of their European neighbours.

== Promoting tourism in San Marino ==
The government of San Marino intends to promote further tourism to the microstate through the Republic of San Marino’s Economic Development Agency Chamber of Commerce. The primary objectives of the agency are to support the Tourist Office and the Ministry of Tourism in order to attract tourists and manage incoming tourist flows, and also to further pursue diplomatic networks and consular connections, in order to develop a profile for the state of San Marino as a unique destination renowned for hospitality, history and landscape.

The Ministry of Tourism in San Marino is reforming its tourism strategy in order to increase the microstate's rate of foreign visitors. This reformed strategy is being implemented through the development of the Internationalization Division within San Marino's Chamber of Commerce. This division seeks to attract arrivals to the region based on three categories; visit San Marino, study in San Marino, and invest in San Marino. The diversification of San Marino's Ministry of Tourism comes as a result of their newly implemented marketing of a “culture of "barrier-free" hospitality... offering tailor-made services according to needs.”

The San Marino Ministry of Tourism has further expanded its capacity for tourists through the development of the Republic of San Marino Conventions & Visitors Bureau. The establishment of the bureau as a directory for services available in the region has occurred to further promote tourism to San Marino by encouraging the conduct of business in the microstate.

The current slogan for tourism in San Marino is as follows; “Imagining It Is Not Enough. Come and experience it.” The new campaign is being implemented to further revenue from tourism, as currently San Marino is the least visited microstate in Europe.

== Events in San Marino ==
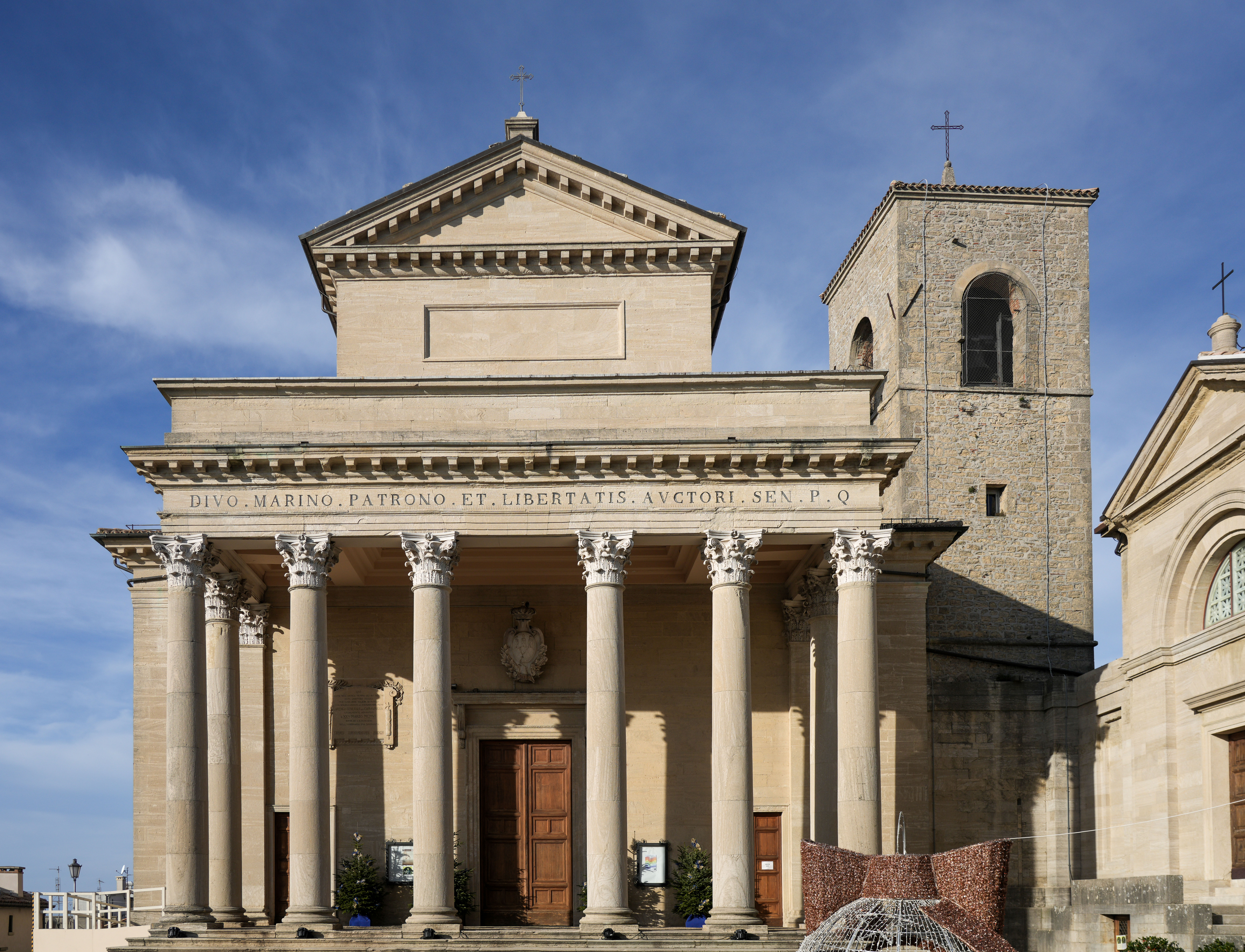
Basilica of San Marino, where the relics of San Marino's patron, Saint Marinus, are held.

San Marino attracts tourists at all times of the year. The principality holds many ceremonies intended to display the millenary history of San Marino as well as its religious heritage.

For example, each year on the 3rd of September, San Marino celebrates the Feast of Saint Marinus (the founder of the Republic) with mass at the Basilica of Saint Marinus. This is followed by a procession throughout the city in which the relics of Saint Marinus are carried. The procession is succeeded by the famous “Palio delle Balestre Gradi” (“crossbow competition”) and a concert by the San Marino military band with a firework display.

Once a year, the world's smallest Republic revives its history when it turns into a theatrical spectacle of the Medieval Days festival. Every July, San Marino entices people within its ancient walls to experience the microstate's centuries-old stories in its medieval village.

Another annual celebration in San Marino is the Catholic religious festivity of the Corpus Domini, held on June 11 each year. This festivity begins with mass at the Basilica of Saint Marinus, followed by a procession around Piazza della Liberta accompanied by the military band.

Additionally, the San Marino and Rimini Coast Motorcycle Grand Prix is an annual event that occurs each September, the first having taken place in 1980.

== See also ==
- Economy of San Marino
