= Lago di Faetano =

- Location within San Marino
- Location: Faetano
- Coordinates: 43°56′26″N 12°30′57″E
- Type: artificial lake
- Primary inflows: Marano
- Primary outflows: Marano
- Basin countries: San Marino
- Built: 1968
- Surface area: 0.0036 km^{2} (0.0014 sq mi)
- Surface elevation: 37 m (121 ft)

Lago di Faetano is a small artificial lake opened in 1968 used for trout fishing near the border with Italy in the castello of Faetano near the road that connects Faetano with Rimini and not far from the Marano stream which also borders to the east the border with Italy.
