= Sammarinese cuisine =

Food in San Marino

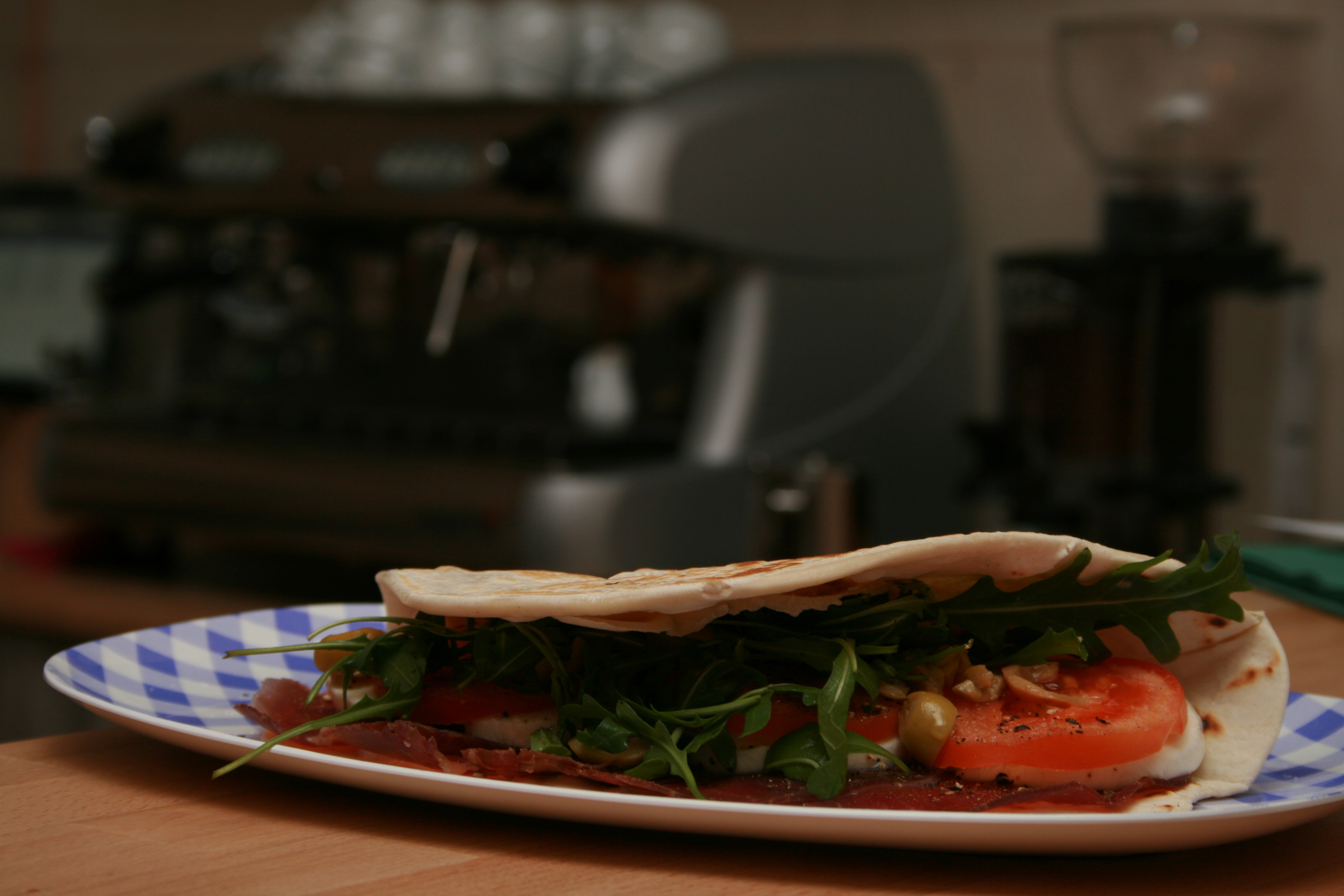
A piada or a piadina with bresaola. Piadine are not only Sammarinese dishes but are also common in the surrounding region, Emilia-Romagna.

As San Marino is a microstate completely landlocked by Italy, Sammarinese cuisine is very similar to Italian cuisine, especially that of the adjoining Emilia-Romagna and Marche regions. San Marino's primary agricultural products are cheese, wine and livestock, and cheesemaking is a primary economic activity in San Marino.

== Dishes ==
Local savoury dishes include fagioli con le cotiche, a Christmas bean and bacon soup; pasta e ceci, a chickpea and noodle soup with garlic and rosemary; nidi di rondine, a baked pasta dish with smoked ham, beef, cheese, and a tomato sauce; and roast rabbit with fennel. Erbazzone is a spinach-based dish that includes cheese and onions. There is a dish found mostly in Borgo Maggiore called piada, which consists of flatbread with various fillings and is somewhat similar to the piadina from Emilia-Romagna.

== Desserts and sweets ==
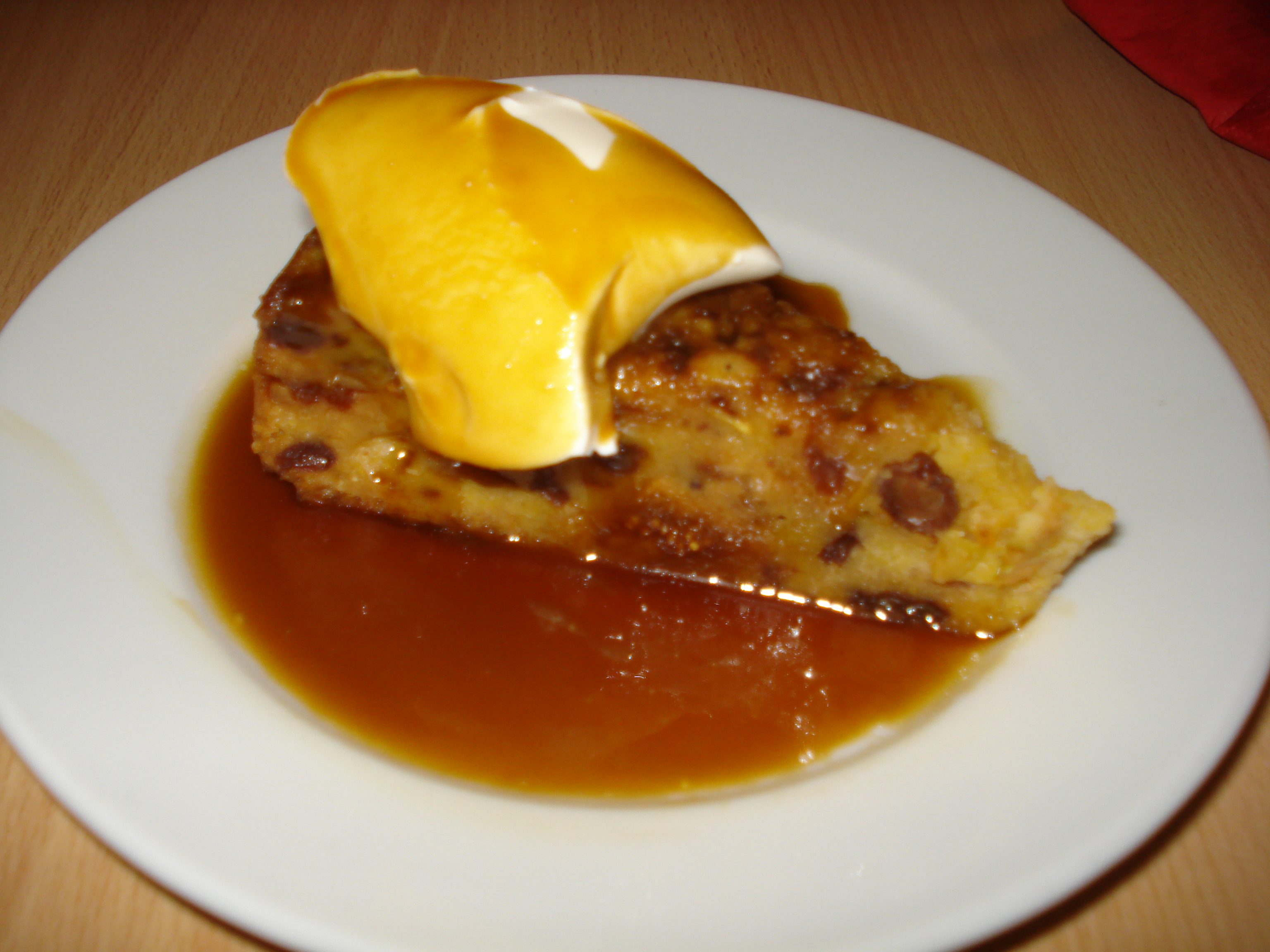
Bustrengo

Sweets include a cake known as Torta Tre Monti, based on the Three Towers of San Marino and similar to a layered wafer cake covered in chocolate; Torta Titano, a layered dessert made with biscuit, hazelnuts, chocolate, cream and coffee, inspired by San Marino's central mountain, Monte Titano; bustrengo, a traditional Christmas cake made with honey, nuts and dried fruit; Verretta, a dessert made of hazelnuts, praline and chocolate wafers; Cacciatello, a dessert made with milk, sugar and eggs, similar to crème caramel; and zuppa di ciliegie, cherries stewed in sweetened red wine and served on white bread.

== Alcoholic beverages ==
=== Wine ===
The region produces a number of wines such as Brugneto and Tessano (cask-aged red wines) and Biancale and Roncale (still white wines). Wine in San Marino is regulated by the San Marino Wine Association, which is also a large-scale wine producer.

=== Spirits ===
Liqueurs include the aniseed-flavoured Mistrà, the truffle-flavoured Tilus and the herbal Tamir Shachar.

== Outside of San Marino ==
San Marino participated in The Exposition Universelle of 1889, a world's fair held in Paris, France, with three exhibits of oils and cheese.
