= List of banks in San Marino =

This article is a list of banks in San Marino. Banks are to be listed alphabetically in order of name, its official website, if a bank has one, and its 8-letter SWIFT code. The list is based on information from the Central Bank of San Marino, which is responsible for financial supervision in San Marino.

== Central Bank ==
Name	Established	Website
Central Bank of San Marino	2005	www.bcsm.sm/en/

== Commercial Banks ==
Name	Website	SWIFT code
Banca Agricola Commerciale Istituto Bancario Sammarinese	www.bac.sm	BASMSMSM
Banca di San Marino	www.bsm.sm	MAOISMS1
Banca Sammarinese di Investimento	www.bsi.sm	BSDISMSD
Cassa di Risparmio della Repubblica di San Marino	www.carisp.sm	CSSMSMSM

== See also ==
- List of banks in the euro area
- List of banks in Europe
