= Central Bank of San Marino =

Financial supervisory authority of San Marino

Central Bank of San Marino Banca Centrale della Repubblica di San Marino
- Central bank of: San Marino
- Headquarters: Via del Voltone, 120 RSM 47890 - Città di San Marino
- Established: 2005
- Ownership: 72% state ownership 28% banks and insurance companies
- President: Catia Tomasetti
- Currency: Euro
- Website: www.bcsm.sm

The Central Bank of the Republic of San Marino (CBSM) (Italian: Banca Centrale della Repubblica di San Marino; Romagnol: Bánca Centrâl dla Repóblica ed San Maréin), is the financial supervisory authority of San Marino. Despite its name, it is not a fully-fledged central bank given San Marino's use of the euro.

The CBSM was established through a merger between the Istituto di Credito Sammarinese (San Marino Credit Institute, a body with public and private shareholders acting as the central bank of the Republic of San Marino) and the Ispettorato per il Credito e le Valute (Inspectorate for Credit and Currencies, a public administration office charged with supervisory and combating money-laundering activities).

The central bank's endowment fund is currently €12.9 million divided into 2,500 indivisible registered shares worth €5,164.57 each. The possessory title of these shares is reserved to the state, as majority shareholder, and to San Marino undertakings engaged in credit, financial and insurance activities.

Pursuant to art. 3 of its statutes the Central Bank of the Republic of San Marino will exercise its powers for the purpose of:

- promoting the stability of the financial system and protecting savings, whose substantial social value is recognised by the republic, through supervision of the credit, financial and insurance activities in which authorised intermediaries are engaged;
- providing banking and financial services to the state and to the public administration, one purpose being to coordinate the management of liquidity and the choice of forms of financing;
- providing adequate support to the financial system of the Republic, to include performing the functions of incentive and guidance;
- facilitating economic and financial activity, setting up and maintaining efficient and reliable payment systems for the republic.

The central bank is answerable for the attainment of its objectives to the Grand and General Council (parliament).

== Powers of the CBSM ==
In order to achieve the objectives and carry out the functions assigned by law, the central bank, through its organs and in its respective areas of competence, may adopt measures, to include those in the form of regulations, orders, circulars, standard letters, recommendations and instructions, which will, besides being of a cogent nature in dealings with supervised parties, also perform the function of explaining and interpreting the tasks assigned to the central bank by Law. The central bank will, adopting the methods regarded as most appropriate, make public the measures referred to in the previous paragraph if they are of general relevance and addressed to the public.

== Relations with state institutions and international banking and financial bodies ==
The central bank will be entitled to assist and inform the Congress of State, through the Department of the State Secretary for Finance, on economic matters and measures which, in the opinion of the central bank, can be associated with and influence the pursuit of the central bank's institutional objectives. The central bank will put forward resolutions and comments on proposed laws and on normative instruments referring directly to the objectives and functions reserved by the law to the central bank, and also draft proposed bills and normative instruments on matters within its sphere of competence, to be submitted to the Congress of State through the Committee for Credit and Savings. The central bank, through the Committee for Credit and Savings, will forward information to the Congress of State on the more significant facts noted or obtained in the exercise of its institutional functions. Jointly with the representatives of the Congress of State, the central bank will represent the Republic of San Marino in all the international financial institutions in which the republic takes part.

== Shareholders ==
- State (Republic of San Marino – Eccellentissima Camera): 72%
- Cassa di Risparmio della Repubblica di San Marino: 16%
- Banca di San Marino: 6%
- Banca Agricola Commerciale Istituto Bancario Sammarinese: 5%
- Banca Sammarinese di Investimento: 1%

== Governing bodies ==
=== Shareholders meeting ===
During the annual meeting, shareholders approve the financial statement and the annual report, which are prepared and presented by the Governing Council, and decide on the admission of new members to the capital of the institution. The state is represented by the Secretary of State for Finance and Budget and by another representative of the government.

=== Governing Council ===
The governing council is made up by the chairman and by five councillors, which are appointed by the Grand and General Council (parliament), for a five-year mandate with the possibility of being re-elected for one additional term. The law assigns to the governing council the powers of policymaking and management of the central bank. The governing council is responsible for preparing the financial statement and submitting it to the shareholders' assembly for approval, accompanied by an explanatory Annual Report. The council is also vested with the power of appointing the director-general, the Supervision Committee, the deputy director, the officers and the general hiring of new staff members.

- Catia Tomasetti - chairman, since May 2018
- Francesco Mancini - Vice Chairman
- Walter Guidi - Member
- Francesco Ielpo - Member

=== Director General ===
The director-general is appointed by the governing council for a six-year term. He attends the meetings of the shareholders and of the Governing Council without voting rights and acts as the chair of the Supervision Committee. The director-general is responsible for managing human resources, coordinating and supervising the work to be carried out.

- Andrea Vivoli – managing director

=== Supervision Committee ===
The Supervision Committee is vested by law with the power of carrying out the supervisory functions on the banking, financial and insurance industry of San Marino, through inspections, reporting activity and regulation.

- Andrea Vivoli – chairman
- Giuliano Battistini – internal inspector
- Marco Giulianelli – internal inspector
- Fabio Mazza – internal inspector
- Maurizio Pappalardo – internal inspector

=== Board of Statutory Auditors ===
Auditors are responsible for supervising the management of the central bank, especially for what regards the compliance of financial statements with the provision of law.

- Pier Angela Gasperoni – chairman
- Monica Zafferani – statutory auditor
- Valentina Di Francesco – statutory auditor

== Headquarters ==
Via del Voltone, 120
RSM 47890 - Città di San Marino
LRepubblica di San Marino

== See also ==
- Economy of San Marino
- Sammarinese Lira
- Sammarinese euro coins
- List of central banks
- List of financial supervisory authorities by country
