= Marano (river) =

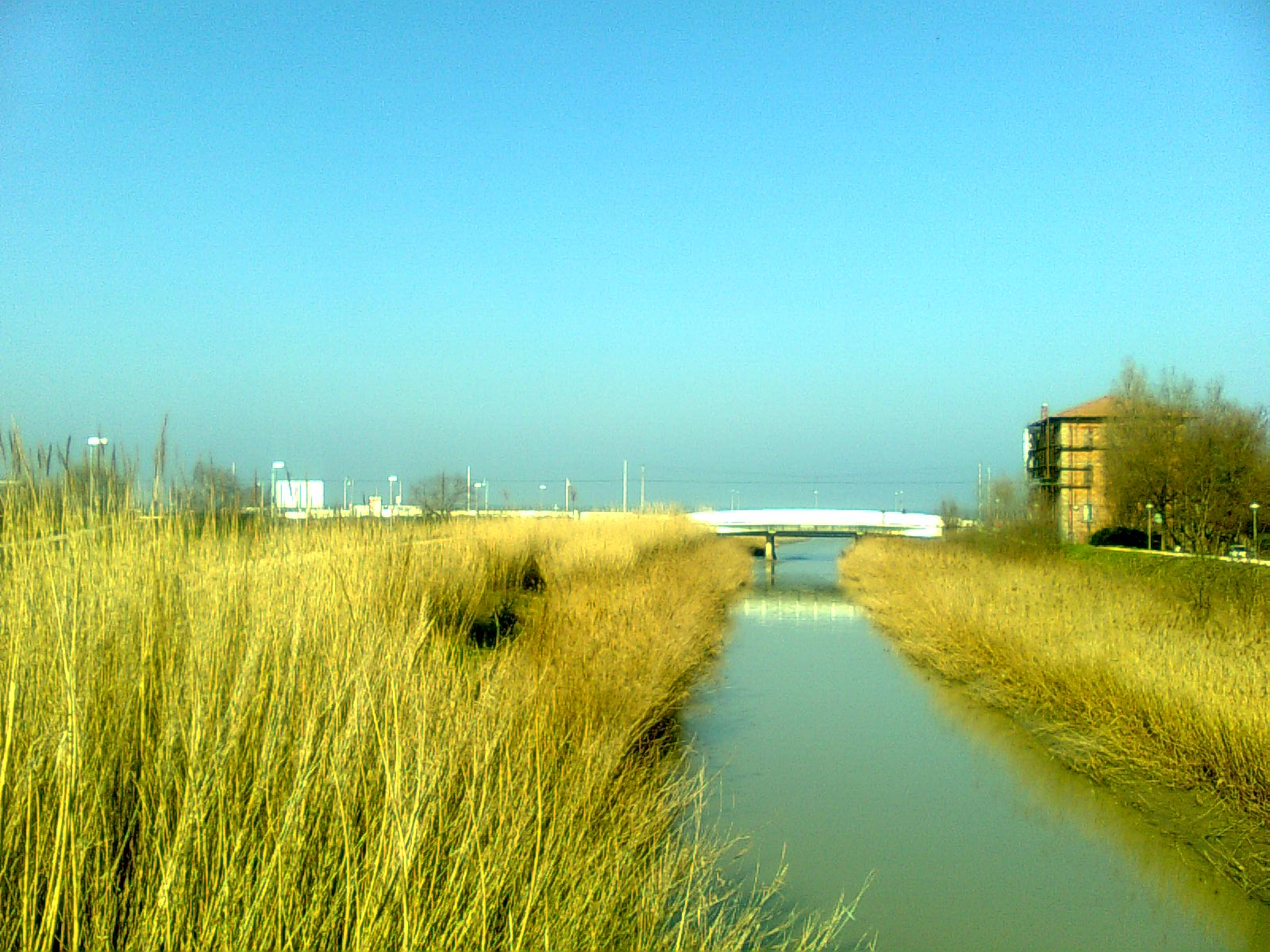

Location
- Country: San Marino and Italy

Physical characteristics
- Source
  - location: Southeast of Domagnano
- Mouth: Adriatic Sea
  - location: near Riccione
  - coordinates: 44.0211°N 12.6374°E

The Marano is a river in San Marino and Emilia-Romagna in Italy. The source of the river is southeast of Domagnano in San Marino. The river flows east and forms part of the eastern border between the province of Rimini in Italy and San Marino. The river joins with the Fiumicello close to the easternmost point of San Marino. The river flows northeast past Ospedaletto and into the Adriatic Sea northwest of Riccione and southeast of Miramare. The Marano's tributaries include the Cando.
