= Geology of San Marino =

The geology of San Marino reflects a complex and chaotic arrangement of allochthon formations, shifted into the region from the west as Liguride nappes during the Miocene Tortonian uplift. Olistostrome slump layers are exposed throughout the south of the country. Tortonian sandstone and limestone form the San Marino Series, where the town of San Marino is built. In 1977, two geologists, Bartolini and Gittoni, published research on argillite sediment in the country. Nardi and Nardi, a similar pair of geologists published their findings in 1975 of gypsum and sulfide formations related to the Messinian salinity crisis—a massive desiccation of the Mediterranean which left thick salt deposits. In the north, San Marino is overlain by Pliocene marine sediments.
