= Cando (river) =

Location
- Country: San Marino

Physical characteristics
- Mouth: Marano
  - coordinates: 43.9248°N 12.4878°E

Basin features
- Progression: Marano→ Adriatic Sea

The Cando is a river of eastern San Marino. It rises to the east of Monte San Cristoforo, flowing northeast to join with the Marano near the town of Faetano.
