= List of birds of San Marino =

This is a list of the bird species recorded in San Marino. The avifauna of San Marino include a total of 130 species, none of which are introduced or endemic.

This list's taxonomic treatment (designation and sequence of orders, families and species) and nomenclature (common and scientific names) follow the conventions of The Clements Checklist of Birds of the World, 2022 edition. The family accounts at the beginning of each heading reflect this taxonomy, as do the species counts found in each family account. Accidental species are included in the total species count for San Marino.

The following tags highlight several categories of occurrence other than regular migrants and residents. The commonly occurring native species are untagged.

- (A) Accidental - a species that rarely or accidentally occurs in San Marino

== Ducks, geese, and waterfowl ==
Order: Anseriformes Family: Anatidae

Anatidae includes the ducks and most duck-like waterfowl, such as geese and swans. These birds are adapted to an aquatic existence with webbed feet, flattened bills, and feathers that are excellent at shedding water due to an oily coating.

- Mallard, Anas platyrhynchos

== Pheasants, grouse, and allies ==
Order: Galliformes Family: Phasianidae

The Phasianidae are a family of terrestrial birds which consists of quails, partridges, snowcocks, francolins, spurfowls, tragopans, monals, pheasants, peafowls and jungle fowls. In general, they are plump (although they vary in size) and have broad, relatively short wings.

- Ring-necked pheasant, Phasianus colchicus
- Common quail, Coturnix coturnix
- Red-legged partridge, Alectoris rufa

== Grebes ==
Order: Podicipediformes Family: Podicipedidae

Grebes are small to medium-large freshwater diving birds. They have lobed toes and are excellent swimmers and divers. However, they have their feet placed far back on the body, making them quite ungainly on land.

- Little grebe, Tachybaptus ruficollis
- Great crested grebe, Podiceps cristatus

== Pigeons and doves ==
Order: Columbiformes Family: Columbidae

Pigeons and doves are stout-bodied birds with short necks and short slender bills with a fleshy cere.

- Rock pigeon, Columba livia
- Stock dove, Columba oenas
- Common wood-pigeon, Columba palumbus
- European turtle-dove, Streptopelia turtur
- Eurasian collared-dove, Streptopelia decaocto

== Cuckoos ==
Order: Cuculiformes Family: Cuculidae

The family Cuculidae includes cuckoos, roadrunners and anis. These birds are of variable size with slender bodies, long tails and strong legs.

- Common cuckoo, Cuculus canorus

== Nightjars and allies ==
Order: Caprimulgiformes Family: Caprimulgidae

Nightjars are medium-sized nocturnal birds that usually nest on the ground. They have long wings, short legs and very short bills. Most have small feet, of little use for walking, and long pointed wings. Their soft plumage is camouflaged to resemble bark or leaves.

- Eurasian nightjar, Caprimulgus europaeus

== Swifts ==
Order: Caprimulgiformes Family: Apodidae

Swifts are small birds which spend the majority of their lives flying. These birds have very short legs and never settle voluntarily on the ground, perching instead only on vertical surfaces. Many swifts have long swept-back wings which resemble a crescent or boomerang.

- Alpine swift, Apus melba
- Common swift, Apus apus
- Pallid swift, Apus pallidus

== Rails, gallinules, and coots ==
Order: Gruiformes Family: Rallidae

Rallidae is a large family of small to medium-sized birds which includes the rails, crakes, coots and gallinules. Typically they inhabit dense vegetation in damp environments near lakes, swamps or rivers. In general they are shy and secretive birds, making them difficult to observe. Most species have strong legs and long toes which are well adapted to soft uneven surfaces. They tend to have short, rounded wings and to be weak fliers.

- Water rail, Rallus aquaticus
- Eurasian moorhen, Gallinula chloropus
- Eurasian coot, Fulica atra

== Plovers and lapwings ==
Order: Charadriiformes Family: Charadriidae

The family Charadriidae includes the plovers, dotterels and lapwings. They are small to medium-sized birds with compact bodies, short, thick necks and long, usually pointed, wings. They are found in open country worldwide, mostly in habitats near water.

- Little ringed plover, Charadrius dubius

== Sandpipers and allies ==
Order: Charadriiformes Family: Scolopacidae

Scolopacidae is a large diverse family of small to medium-sized shorebirds including the sandpipers, curlews, godwits, shanks, tattlers, woodcocks, snipes, dowitchers and phalaropes. The majority of these species eat small invertebrates picked out of the mud or soil. Variation in length of legs and bills enables multiple species to feed in the same habitat, particularly on the coast, without direct competition for food.

- Common sandpiper, Actitis hypoleucos

== Gulls, terns, and skimmers ==
Order: Charadriiformes Family: Laridae

Laridae is a family of medium to large seabirds, the gulls, terns, and skimmers. Gulls are typically grey or white, often with black markings on the head or wings. They have stout, longish bills and webbed feet. Terns are a group of generally medium to large seabirds typically with grey or white plumage, often with black markings on the head. Most terns hunt fish by diving but some pick insects off the surface of fresh water. Terns are generally long-lived birds, with several species known to live in excess of 30 years.

- Black-headed gull, Chroicocephalus ridibundus
- Yellow-legged gull, Larus michahellis

== Herons, egrets, and bitterns ==
Order: Pelecaniformes Family: Ardeidae

The family Ardeidae contains the bitterns, herons, and egrets. Herons and egrets are medium to large wading birds with long necks and legs. Bitterns tend to be shorter necked and more wary. Members of Ardeidae fly with their necks retracted, unlike other long-necked birds such as storks, ibises and spoonbills.

- Little bittern, Ixobrychus minutus
- Gray heron, Ardea cinerea
- Cattle egret, Bubulcus ibis (A)

== Osprey ==
Order: Accipitriformes Family: Pandionidae

The family Pandionidae contains only one species, the osprey. The osprey is a medium-large raptor which is a specialist fish-eater with a worldwide distribution.

- Osprey, Pandion haliaetus

== Hawks, eagles, and kites ==
Order: Accipitriformes Family: Accipitridae

Accipitridae is a family of birds of prey, which includes hawks, eagles, kites, harriers and Old World vultures. These birds have powerful hooked beaks for tearing flesh from their prey, strong legs, powerful talons and keen eyesight.

- European honey-buzzard, Pernis apivorus
- Golden eagle, Aquila chrysaetos (A)
- Montagu's harrier, Circus pygargus
- Eurasian sparrowhawk, Accipiter nisus
- Red kite, Milvus milvus
- Black kite, Milvus migrans
- Common buzzard, Buteo buteo

== Barn-owls ==
Order: Strigiformes Family: Tytonidae

Barn-owls are medium to large owls with large heads and characteristic heart-shaped faces. They have long strong legs with powerful talons.

- Western barn owl, Tyto alba

== Owls ==
Order: Strigiformes Family: Strigidae

The typical owls are small to large solitary nocturnal birds of prey. They have large forward-facing eyes and ears, a hawk-like beak and a conspicuous circle of feathers around each eye called a facial disk.

- Eurasian scops-owl, Otus scops
- Little owl, Athene noctua
- Tawny owl, Strix aluco
- Long-eared owl, Asio otus

== Hoopoes ==
Order: Bucerotiformes Family: Upupidae

Hoopoes have black, white and orangey-pink colouring with a large erectile crest on their head.

- Eurasian hoopoe, Upupa epops

== Kingfishers ==
Order: Coraciiformes Family: Alcedinidae

Kingfishers are medium-sized birds with large heads, long, pointed bills, short legs and stubby tails.

- Common kingfisher, Alcedo atthis

== Bee-eaters ==
Order: Coraciiformes Family: Meropidae

The bee-eaters are a group of coraciiform birds in the family Meropidae. Most species are found in Africa but others occur in southern Europe, Madagascar, Australia and New Guinea. They are characterised by richly coloured plumage, slender bodies and usually elongated central tail feathers. All are colourful and have long downturned bills and pointed wings, which give them a swallow-like appearance when seen from afar.

- European bee-eater, Merops apiaster

== Woodpeckers ==
Order: Piciformes Family: Picidae

Woodpeckers are small to medium-sized birds with chisel-like beaks, short legs, stiff tails and long tongues used for capturing insects. Some species have feet with two toes pointing forward and two backward, while several species have only three toes. Many woodpeckers have the habit of tapping noisily on tree trunks with their beaks.

- Eurasian wryneck, Jynx torquilla
- Great spotted woodpecker, Dendrocopos major
- Lesser spotted woodpecker, Dryobates minor
- Eurasian green woodpecker, Picus viridis
- Black woodpecker, Dryocopus martius

== Falcons and caracaras ==
Order: Falconiformes Family: Falconidae

Falconidae is a family of diurnal birds of prey. They differ from hawks, eagles and kites in that they kill with their beaks instead of their talons.

- Eurasian kestrel, Falco tinnunculus
- Eurasian hobby, Falco subbuteo
- Peregrine falcon, Falco peregrinus

== Old World orioles ==
Order: Passeriformes Family: Oriolidae

The Old World orioles are colourful passerine birds. They are not related to the New World orioles.

- Eurasian golden oriole, Oriolus oriolus

== Shrikes ==
Order: Passeriformes Family: Laniidae

Shrikes are passerine birds known for their habit of catching other birds and small animals and impaling the uneaten portions of their bodies on thorns. A typical shrike's beak is hooked, like a bird of prey.

- Red-backed shrike, Lanius collurio
- Lesser gray shrike, Lanius minor (A)

== Crows, jays, and magpies ==
Order: Passeriformes Family: Corvidae

The family Corvidae includes crows, ravens, jays, choughs, magpies, treepies, nutcrackers and ground jays. Corvids are above average in size among the Passeriformes, and some of the larger species show high levels of intelligence.

- Eurasian jay, Garrulus glandarius
- Eurasian magpie, Pica pica
- Eurasian jackdaw, Corvus monedula
- Rook, Corvus frugilegus
- Carrion crow, Corvus corone
- Hooded crow, Corvus cornix
- Common raven, Corvus corax

== Tits, chickadees, and titmice ==
Order: Passeriformes Family: Paridae

The Paridae are mainly small stocky woodland species with short stout bills. Some have crests. They are adaptable birds, with a mixed diet including seeds and insects.

- Coal tit, Periparus ater
- Marsh tit, Poecile palustris
- Willow tit, Poecile montanus (A)
- Eurasian blue tit, Cyanistes caeruleus
- Great tit, Parus major

== Penduline-tits ==
Order: Passeriformes Family: Remizidae

The penduline-tits are a group of small passerine birds related to the true tits. They are insectivores.

- Eurasian penduline-tit, Remiz pendulinus

== Larks ==
Order: Passeriformes Family: Alaudidae

Larks are small terrestrial birds with often extravagant songs and display flights. Most larks are fairly dull in appearance. Their food is insects and seeds

- Wood lark, Lullula arborea
- Eurasian skylark, Alauda arvensis

== Cisticolas and allies ==
Order: Passeriformes Family: Cisticolidae

The Cisticolidae are warblers found mainly in warmer southern regions of the Old World. They are generally very small birds of drab brown or grey appearance found in open country such as grassland or scrub.

- Zitting cisticola, Cisticola juncidis

== Reed warblers and allies ==
Order: Passeriformes Family: Acrocephalidae

The members of this family are usually rather large for "warblers". Most are rather plain olivaceous brown above with much yellow to beige below. They are usually found in open woodland, reedbeds, or tall grass. The family occurs mostly in southern to western Eurasia and surroundings, but it also ranges far into the Pacific, with some species in Africa.

- Melodious warbler, Hippolais polyglotta
- Eurasian reed warbler, Acrocephalus scirpaceus

== Swallows ==
Order: Passeriformes Family: Hirundinidae

The family Hirundinidae is adapted to aerial feeding. They have a slender streamlined body, long pointed wings and a short bill with a wide gape. The feet are adapted to perching rather than walking, and the front toes are partially joined at the base.

- Bank swallow, Riparia riparia
- Barn swallow, Hirundo rustica
- Common house-martin, Delichon urbicum

== Leaf warblers ==
Order: Passeriformes Family: Phylloscopidae

Leaf warblers are a family of small insectivorous birds found mostly in Eurasia and ranging into Wallacea and Africa. The species are of various sizes, often green-plumaged above and yellow below, or more subdued with greyish-green to greyish-brown colors.

- Western Bonelli's warbler, Phylloscopus bonelli
- Common chiffchaff, Phylloscopus collybita

== Bush warblers and allies ==
Order: Passeriformes Family: Scotocercidae

The members of this family are found throughout Africa, Asia, and Polynesia. Their taxonomy is in flux, and some authorities place some genera in other families.

- Cetti's warbler, Cettia cetti

== Long-tailed tits ==
Order: Passeriformes Family: Aegithalidae

Long-tailed tits are a group of small passerine birds with medium to long tails. They make woven bag nests in trees. Most eat a mixed diet which includes insects.

- Long-tailed tit, Aegithalos caudatus

== Sylviid warblers, parrotbills, and allies ==
Order: Passeriformes Family: Sylviidae

The family Sylviidae is a group of small insectivorous passerine birds. They mainly occur as breeding species, as the common name implies, in Europe, Asia and, to a lesser extent, Africa. Most are of generally undistinguished appearance, but many have distinctive songs.

- Eurasian blackcap, Sylvia atricapilla
- Garden warbler, Sylvia borin
- Lesser whitethroat, Curruca curruca
- Sardinian warbler, Curruca melanocephala
- Moltoni's warbler, Curruca subalpina
- Eastern subalpine warbler, Curruca cantillans
- Greater whitethroat, Curruca communis

== Kinglets ==
Order: Passeriformes Family: Regulidae

The kinglets, also called crests, are a small group of birds often included in the Old World warblers, but frequently given family status because they also resemble the titmice.

- Goldcrest, Regulus regulus
- Common firecrest, Regulus ignicapillus

== Wallcreeper ==
Order: Passeriformes Family: Tichodromidae

The wallcreeper is a small bird related to the nuthatch family, which has stunning crimson, grey and black plumage.

- Wallcreeper, Tichodroma muraria

== Nuthatches ==
Order: Passeriformes Family: Sittidae

Nuthatches are small woodland birds. They have the unusual ability to climb down trees head first, unlike other birds which can only go upwards. Nuthatches have big heads, short tails and powerful bills and feet.

- Eurasian nuthatch, Sitta europaea

== Treecreepers ==
Order: Passeriformes Family: Certhiidae

Treecreepers are small woodland birds, brown above and white below. They have thin pointed down-curved bills, which they use to extricate insects from bark. They have stiff tail feathers, like woodpeckers, which they use to support themselves on vertical trees.

- Short-toed treecreeper, Certhia brachydactyla

== Wrens ==
Order: Passeriformes Family: Troglodytidae

The wrens are mainly small and inconspicuous except for their loud songs. These birds have short wings and thin down-turned bills. Several species often hold their tails upright. All are insectivorous.

- Eurasian wren, Troglodytes troglodytes

== Dippers ==
Order: Passeriformes Family: Cinclidae

Dippers are a group of perching birds whose habitat includes aquatic environments in the Americas, Europe and Asia. They are named for their bobbing or dipping movements.

- White-throated dipper, Cinclus cinclus

== Starlings ==
Order: Passeriformes Family: Sturnidae

Starlings are small to medium-sized passerine birds. Their flight is strong and direct and they are very gregarious. Their preferred habitat is fairly open country. They eat insects and fruit. Plumage is typically dark with a metallic sheen.

- European starling, Sturnus vulgaris

== Thrushes and allies ==
Order: Passeriformes Family: Turdidae

The thrushes are a group of passerine birds that occur mainly in the Old World. They are plump, soft plumaged, small to medium-sized insectivores or sometimes omnivores, often feeding on the ground. Many have attractive songs.

- Mistle thrush, Turdus viscivorus
- Song thrush, Turdus philomelos
- Redwing, Turdus iliacus
- Eurasian blackbird, Turdus merula
- Fieldfare, Turdus pilaris

== Old World flycatchers ==
Order: Passeriformes Family: Muscicapidae

Old World flycatchers are a large group of small passerine birds native to the Old World. They are mainly small arboreal insectivores. The appearance of these birds is highly varied, but they mostly have weak songs and harsh calls.

- Spotted flycatcher, Muscicapa striata
- European robin, Erithacus rubecula
- Common nightingale, Luscinia megarhynchos
- Common redstart, Phoenicurus phoenicurus
- Black redstart, Phoenicurus ochruros
- Blue rock-thrush, Monticola solitarius
- Whinchat, Saxicola rubetra
- European stonechat, Saxicola rubicola
- Northern wheatear, Oenanthe oenanthe

== Accentors ==
Order: Passeriformes Family: Prunellidae

The accentors are in the only bird family, Prunellidae, which is completely endemic to the Palearctic. They are small, fairly drab species superficially similar to sparrows.

- Alpine accentor, Prunella collaris (A)
- Dunnock, Prunella modularis

== Old World sparrows ==
Order: Passeriformes Family: Passeridae

Old World sparrows are small passerine birds. In general, sparrows tend to be small, plump, brown or grey birds with short tails and short powerful beaks. Sparrows are seed eaters, but they also consume small insects.

- Italian sparrow, Passer italiae
- Eurasian tree sparrow, Passer montanus

== Wagtails and pipits ==
Order: Passeriformes Family: Motacillidae

Motacillidae is a family of small passerine birds with medium to long tails. They include the wagtails, longclaws and pipits. They are slender, ground feeding insectivores of open country.

- Gray wagtail, Motacilla cinerea
- Western yellow wagtail, Motacilla flava
- White wagtail, Motacilla alba
- Tawny pipit, Anthus campestris
- Meadow pipit, Anthus pratensis

== Finches, euphonias, and allies ==
Order: Passeriformes Family: Fringillidae

Finches are seed-eating passerine birds, that are small to moderately large and have a strong beak, usually conical and in some species very large. All have twelve tail feathers and nine primaries. These birds have a bouncing flight with alternating bouts of flapping and gliding on closed wings, and most sing well.

- Common chaffinch, Fringilla coelebs
- Brambling, Fringilla montifringilla
- Hawfinch, Coccothraustes coccothraustes
- European greenfinch, Chloris chloris
- Eurasian linnet, Linaria cannabina
- European goldfinch, Carduelis carduelis
- European serin, Serinus serinus
- Eurasian siskin, Spinus spinus

== Old World buntings ==
Order: Passeriformes Family: Emberizidae

The emberizids are a large family of passerine birds. They are seed-eating birds with distinctively shaped bills. Many emberizid species have distinctive head patterns.

- Corn bunting, Emberiza calandra
- Rock bunting, Emberiza cia
- Cirl bunting, Emberiza cirlus
- Yellowhammer, Emberiza citrinella
- Ortolan bunting, Emberiza hortulana
- Reed bunting, Emberiza schoeniclus

== See also ==
- List of birds
- Lists of birds by region
