= Telecommunications in San Marino =

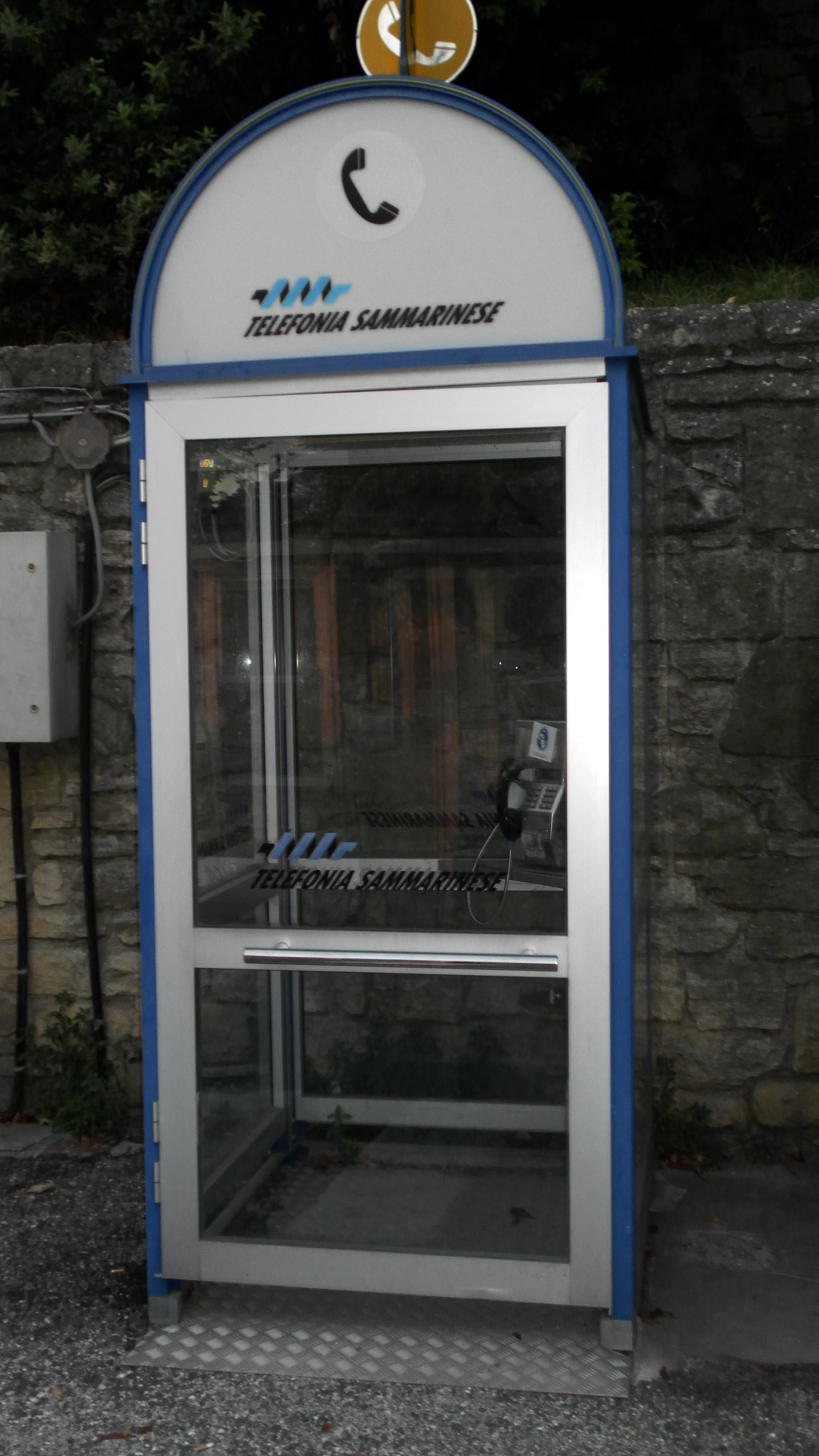
Phone booth in the City of San Marino

This article provides an outline of the telecommunications infrastructure in the country of San Marino.

== Postal system ==
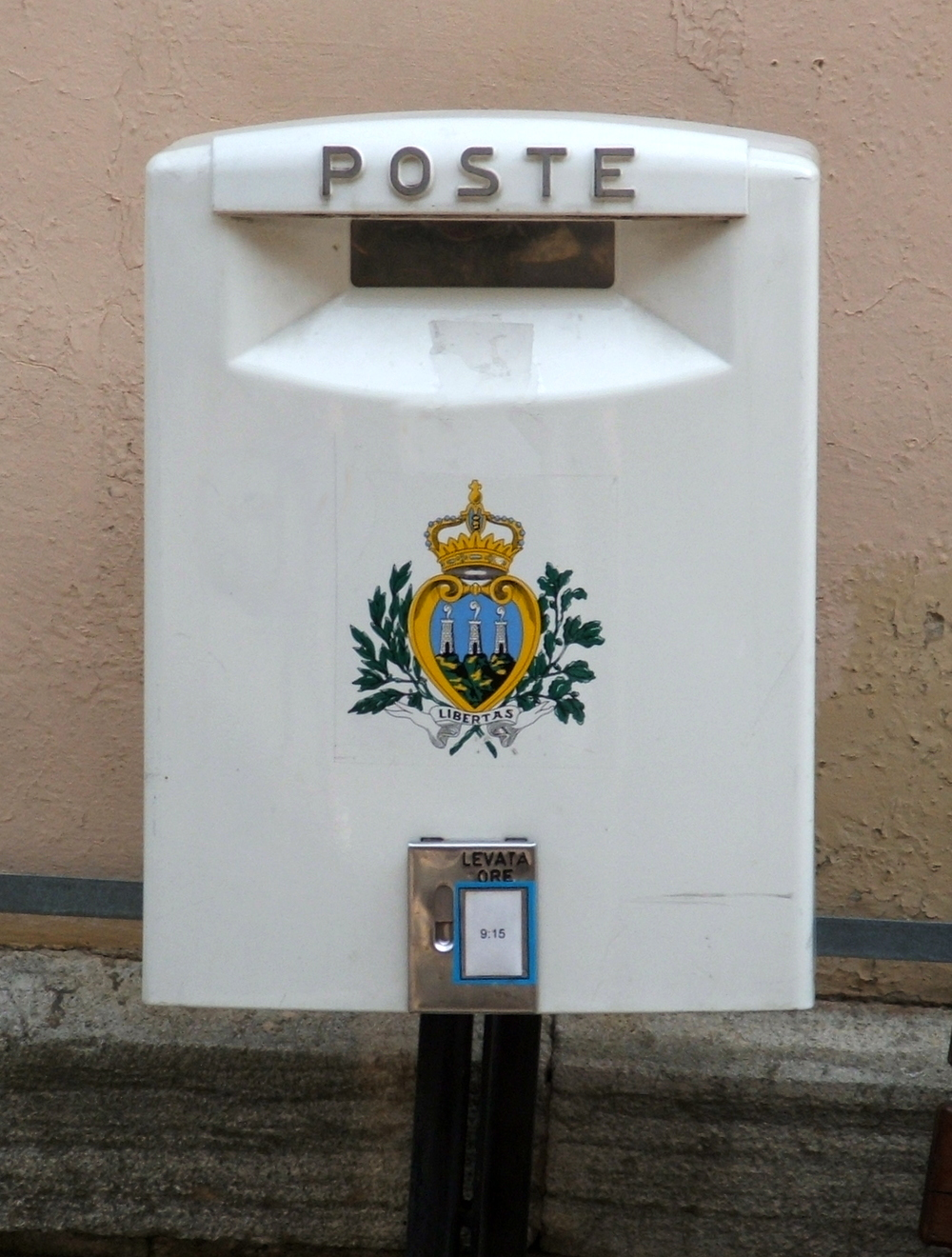
Postbox of the Sammarinese postal service

Poste San Marino is the public agency responsible for managing postal services in San Marino.

=== Post offices ===
- Acquaviva – Via Federico da Montebello, 5
- Borgo Maggiore – Piazza Grande, 25
- Chiesanuova – Via Corrado Forti, 64
- City of San Marino – Via Gino Giacomini, 69
- Dogana – Piazza Marino Tini, 3
- Domagnano – Via Ugolino Leonardi, 25
- Fiorentino – Via la Rena, 19
- Faetano – Strada della Croce, 48
- Montegiardino – Strada del Dragone, 17
- Serravalle – Via Coluccio Salutati, 3
- Arrivals and departures (non-public office) – Strada degli Angariari, 13 – Rovereta (postal locality: Dogana)

== Telephone ==
=== Telecom Italia San Marino (TISM) ===
It is the main telecommunications company in San Marino, founded in 1992 as Intelcom and former monopolist of the Sammarinese telephony market. It offers mobile and fixed-line telephony services, Internet data center services and top-level domain registration authority (.sm).

=== Telefonia Mobile Sammarinese (TMS) ===
Created in 1999, it is 51% controlled by Telecom Italia San Marino, from which it uses the infrastructure for its mobile telephony services.

== Television and radio ==
San Marino has only one television station, San Marino RTV, which is owned by a company with the same name.

San Marino has two radio networks, Radio San Marino and Radio San Marino Classic, also owned by San Marino RTV. In 1997, there were approximately 16,000 radios in San Marino.

== Broadcasting system ==
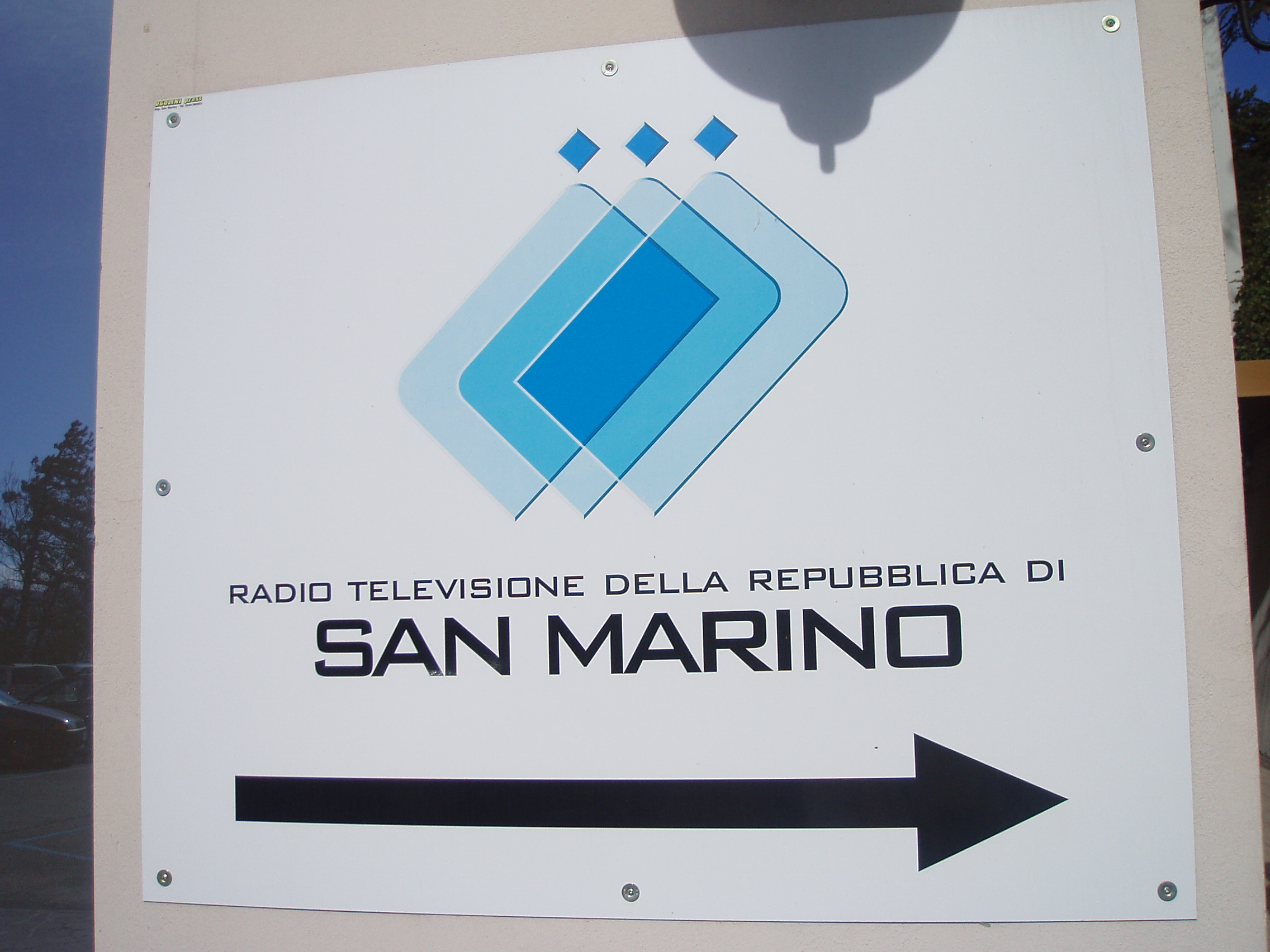
The logo of San Marino RTV until 2011.

San Marino RTV, the public broadcasting concessionaire, operates one television channel, which is also receivable in Italy in the area between Venice, Bologna, Romagna and part of the Marche region on digital terrestrial television (DTT) multiplex channel 51. Since October 2021, the channel has been available throughout Italy at LCN 831.

== Internet ==
In 2010 there were 17,000 Internet users in San Marino. San Marino's Internet domain is .sm.

San Marino became the first country to achieve full 5G coverage, achieving this in 2018.
