= Banca di San Marino =

- Company type: Società per azioni
- Industry: Financial services
- Founded: 1920
- Founder: Don Eugenio Fabbri
- Headquarters: Faetano, San Marino
- Products: Private banking, Corporate, retail, wealth management, asset management
- Number of employees: 110 (FTE, June 2024 in Banca di San Marino Group)
- Website: http://www.bsm.sm/

The Bank of San Marino is an institution created on December 20, 1920, in Faetano, Republic of San Marino. It was don Eugenio Fabbri, then parish priest in Faetano, who, together with some parishioners, founded the first cooperative association in general partnership of that territory. Until 2001 it was called Rural Bank of Loans and Deposits in Faetano (Cassa Rurale di Depositi e Prestiti di Faetano), then its name was changed to Bank of San Marino (Banca di San Marino SpA ).

A first branch was opened in the capital of San Marino in 1974. Today there are 8 branches, with more than 100 employees.

The Foundation Ente Cassa di Faetano is the main shareholder of the Bank of San Marino. The Foundation Ente Cassa di Faetano is a non-profit organization which reinvests its profits with the purpose of development in all of the Republic of San Marino.

== See also ==
- List of banks in San Marino
