= Fiumicello (river) =

Location
- Country: San Marino, Italy

Physical characteristics
- Mouth: Marano
  - coordinates: 43.9398°N 12.5153°E

Basin features
- Progression: Marano→ Adriatic Sea

The Fiumicello is a river in the Italian Peninsula. It rises in San Marino, flowing east to the Italian border. It is a left tributary of the Marano.
