= Sammarinese wine =

Wine making in San Marino

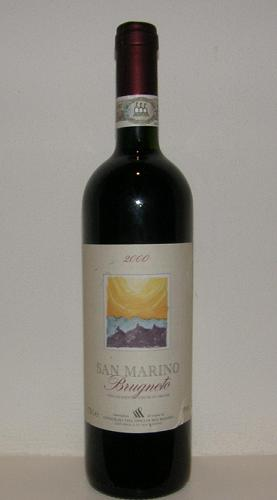
A Bottle of wine from San Marino

Sammarinese wine is wine from San Marino, which is home to a small but profitable wine industry. Being a small enclave within Italy, its wine industry is often overshadowed by its larger neighbour. The country produces a number of wines such as Brugneto and Tessano (cask-aged red wines) and Biancale and Roncale (still white wines).

== History ==
Grapevines have been cultivated on slopes of San Marino for nearly 2000 years. The oldest known records of winemaking in San Marino stem from the 13th century, however remains of viticulture related objects dating back to 1st century A.D. have been discovered by archeologists.

In 1979, Cantina di San Marino (a.k.a. Consorzio Vini Tipici di San Marino) was established. It is the only entity producing wine in San Marino.

== Grape varieties ==
The leading grape varieties are Sangiovese for red wines, Biancale and Ribolla for white wines, and Moscato for sweeter white wines. Chardonnay, Cabernet Sauvignon, and Merlot grapes are also used in San Marino.

== Production ==
San Marino winemakier produce about 6500 hectoliters which equates to a volume of more than 866,000 standard 750 ml bottles of wine per year. Approximately 85 percent of the intense, ruby red wines or crispy whites like Biancale produced in San Marino are sold within the country.

The wines are being exported to Germany, Japan, United States, Switzerland, and England.

== See also ==
- Winemaking
