= Bustrengo =

Traditional Italian moist cake

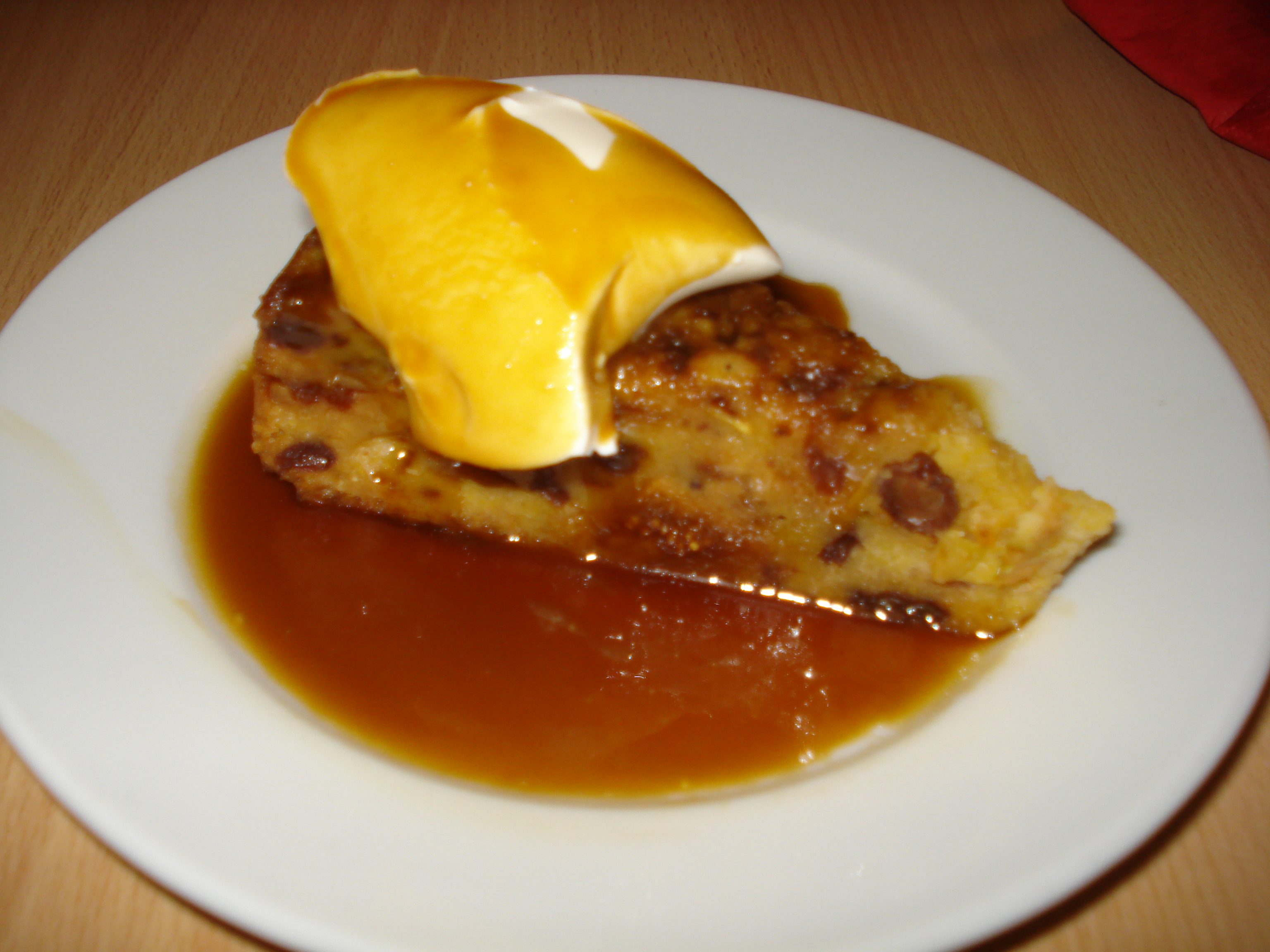
- Alternative names: Bustrèng
- Type: Cake
- Place of origin: Italy; San Marino

Bustrengo, also called bustrèng, is a cake in Romagnol and Sammarinese cuisine. It is a traditional Christmas dish in the Italian provinces of Forlì-Cesena and Rimini, Emilia-Romagna, and in the Republic of San Marino. Ingredients include standard cake ingredients, such as flour, leavening, olive oil or shortening, sugar or honey, etc., along with cornmeal, breadcrumbs or stale bread, figs, raisins, diced apples, lemon rind and orange rind. Bustrengo is typically a dense and moist cake.

Traditional preparation of bustrengo involves cooking it in a fireplace in a copper pot with the lid covered in hot coals.

== See also ==
Media related to Bustrengo at Wikimedia Commons

- List of Italian desserts and pastries
- List of cakes
- List of Christmas dishes
