= Torta Tre Monti =

Traditional Sammarinese cake

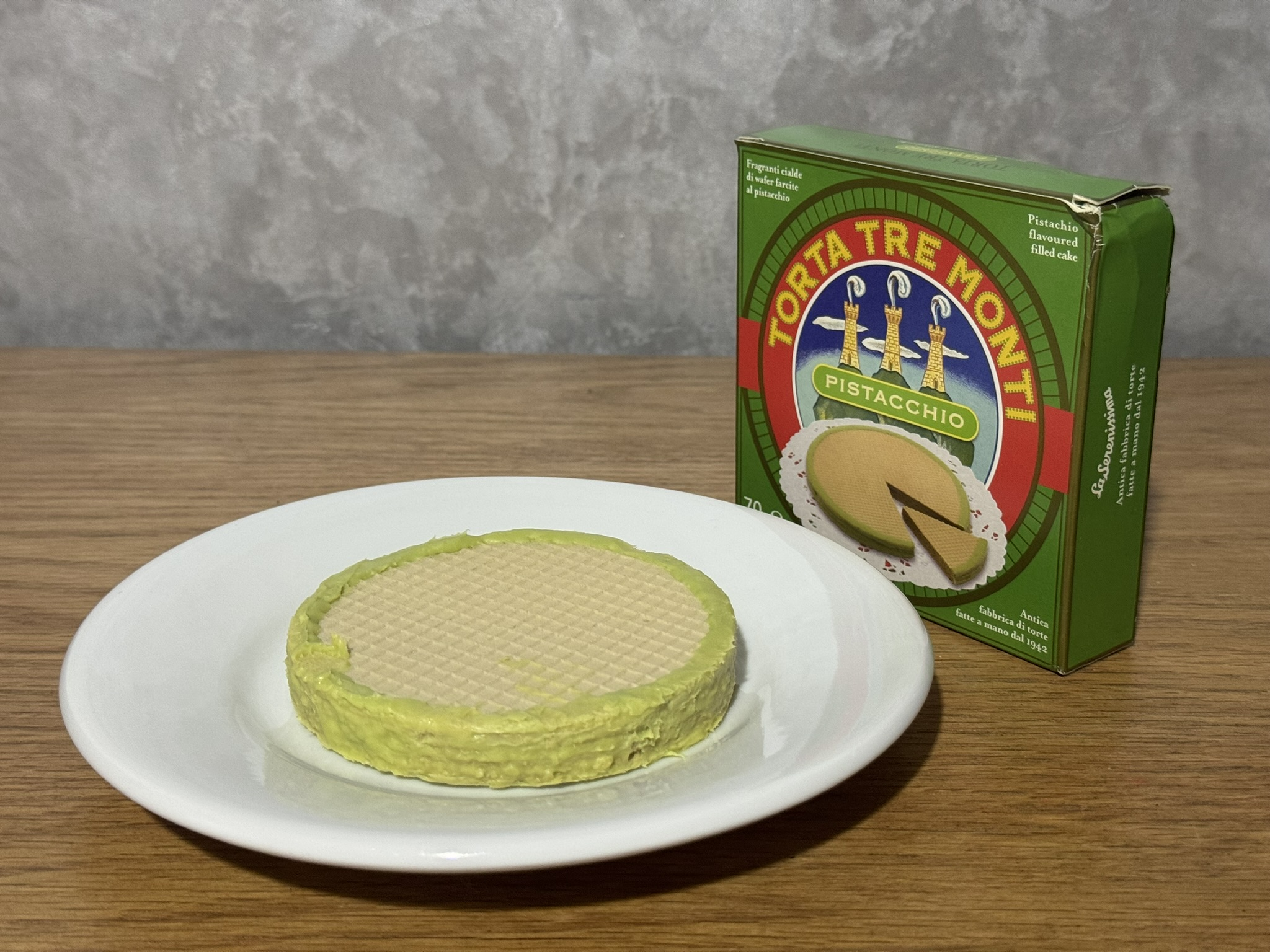
- Snack-size, pistachio-flavored torta produced by La Serenissima
- Type: Cake
- Place of origin: San Marino
- Main ingredients: Wafers, chocolate or hazelnut creme, chocolate fondant

Torta Tre Monti (lit. 'Three Mountains Cake') is a traditional Sammarinese cake made of layers of thin waffled wafers adhered together by chocolate or hazelnut crème. The final product is covered in chocolate fondant. It is similar to other layered desserts common to San Marino, this one being representative of the Three Towers of San Marino.

In San Marino, the torta has been commercially produced by La Serenissima since 1942. The bakery markets both a full-size cake and snack-size version, in addition to a variation that includes coffee.

== See also ==
- List of cakes
