= Economy of San Marino =

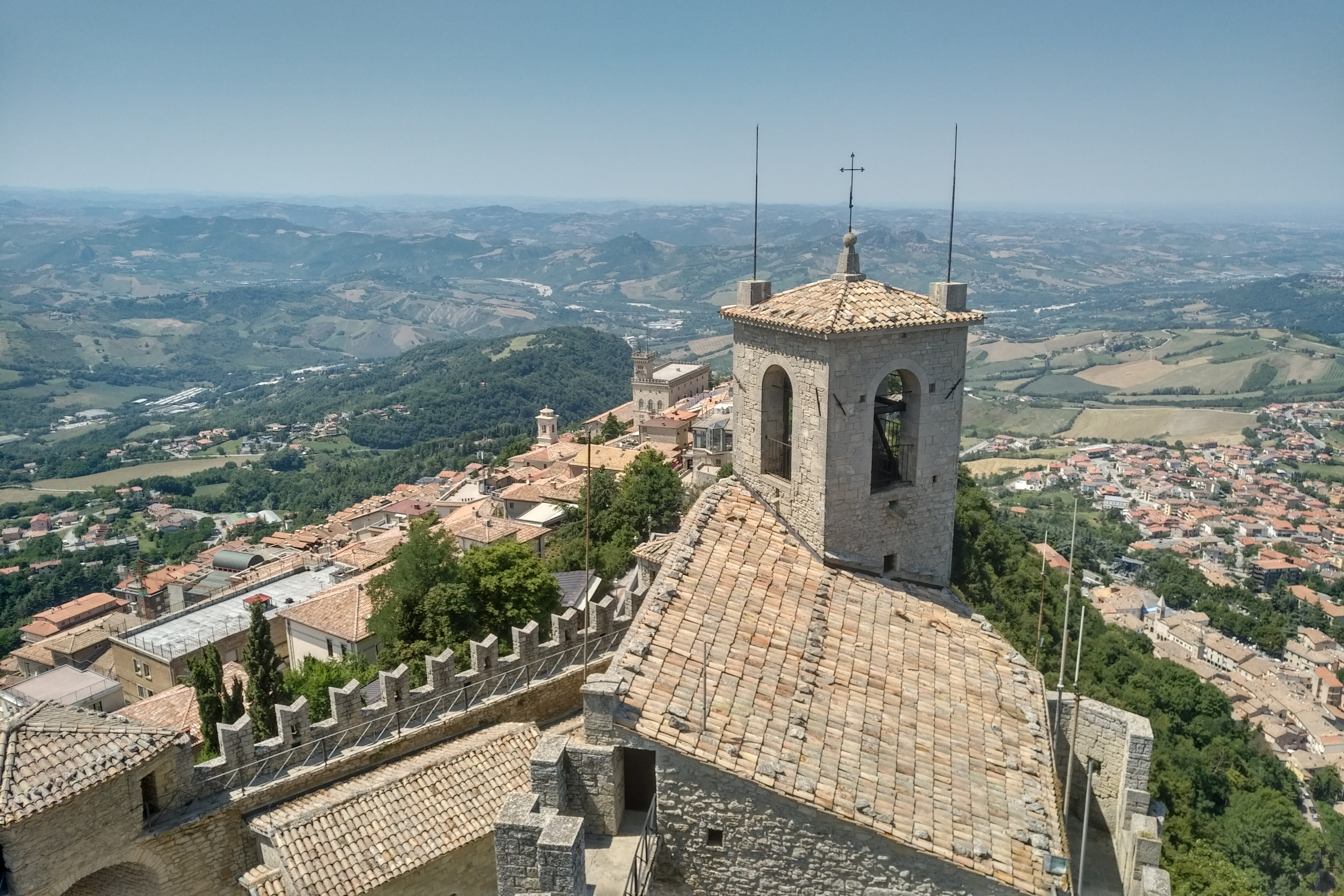
- Currency: Euro (EUR, €)
- Trade organisations: EU Customs Union
- Country group: Developed/Advanced; High-income economy

Statistics
- Population: ▲34,735 (1 January 2020)
- GDP: ▲$2.840 billion (nominal, 2025); ▲$2.978 billion (PPP, 2025)
- GDP rank: 171st (nominal; 2024); 176th (PPP; 2024)
- GDP growth: ▲4.6% (2022); ▲1.2% (2023f); ▲1.0% (2024f)
- GDP per capita: ▲$61,520 (nominal, 2025); ▼$82,589 (PPP, 2025)
- GDP per capita rank: 12th (nominal; 2024); 7th (PPP; 2024)
- GDP by sector: Agriculture: 0.1%; Industry: 39.2%; Services: 60.7%; (2017)
- Inflation (CPI): 1.95% (2020 est.)
- Human Development Index: ▲0.867 very high (2022) (43rd)
- Labour force: 23,963 (2019)
- Labour force by occupation: Agriculture: 0.2%; Industry: 33.5%; Services: 66.3%; (2013)
- Unemployment: ▼7.66% (2019)

External
- Exports: €1,638.7 million (2018 est.)
- Main export partners: Italy, France, Germany
- Imports: €1,496.3 million (2018 est.)
- Main import partners: Italy, China, Germany
- Current account: ▼ −€22.2 million (2018)

Public finance
- Government debt: ▲30.3% of GDP (2018, official); ▲78.8% of GDP (2018, IMF)
- Revenue: ▲23% of GDP (2018)
- Spending: ▼24.5% of GDP (2018)
- Credit rating: Standard & Poor's: BBB+ (Foreign); A-2 (Domestic); AAA (T&C Assessment); Outlook: Stable (2025); Fitch: BB+; Outlook: Positive (2025); DBRS: BBB (low); Outlook: Positive (2025)
- All values, unless otherwise stated, are in US dollars.

The economy of San Marino is a developed free-market economy focused on industries such as tourism, banking, and the manufacture of ceramics, clothing, fabrics, furniture, paints, spirits, tiles, and wine. Taken together, the manufacturing and financial sector make up more than half of the national GDP. The primary sector contribution to the GDP of the country is marginal, with the main agricultural products being wine and cheeses. In addition, San Marino sells collectible postage stamps to philatelists.

== Overview ==
San Marino's per-capita GDP stands at almost $62,000 in 2025, placing the country 12th in the world. Overall, the per capita level of output and standard of living is comparable to the richest regions of Italy. Most of the food, water, and other raw resources are imported from Italy, including also the totality of electricity and natural gas. Taxes, especially on labor and capital income, are generally much lower than in Italy, therefore, there are extremely strict requirements to obtain citizenship.

Following the global recession of 2007–2008, San Marino's economy contracted considerably, especially in the finance and banking sector. As a result, GDP decreased by 40% between 2008 and 2019, and unemployment, which was practically nonexistent until 2007, rose to around 5–8% in the years following the great recession. During the same period, banks' deposits plummeted, going from almost 14 billion euros in 2008 to 5.2 billion. An important liquidity crisis followed suit, also made worse by the absence of a lender of last resort, as San Marino is not part of the European Union. As a consequence of these events, several banks have been bailed-out by the government, including Cassa di Risparmio, the main bank of the country. Still, the banking system remains weak, with balance sheets that are impaired by non-Performing Loans, which amount to 114% of the country's GDP.

The country is shifting away from an economic model typical of tax havens, reliant on banks and tax secrecy. Major steps in this direction were taken in 2010 with the abolition of anonymous companies and in 2017 with the abolition of banking secrecy. Currently, San Marino actively cooperates with international organizations, especially the Council of Europe and the European Union, for what regards fighting against money laundering and terrorism financing. As a result, San Marino was removed from the Italian blacklist of tax havens in 2014, and from that of Ecofin in 2017.

== Public finances ==
In the years preceding the great recession, San Marino's public finances were in very good shape, with a central government budget surplus and no national debt. During the global downturn, the government adopted measures to dampen the shock on the real economy and to bail out financial institutions, which came at a high price for the soundness of public finances. The official estimates place government debt at 32% of GDP in 2020, however, the actual value is equal to 86% according to the International Monetary Fund, which takes a broader view in considering government's liabilities.

While San Marino does not issue public debt securities that are traded on financial markets, its creditworthiness is monitored by the rating agency Fitch. The current rating of BB+ is the result of several downgrades that occurred during and after the great recession: from AA to A in 2009 and to BBB in 2016.

== Economic relations with Italy and the EU ==
In the years following the Italian unification of 1861, several treaties were signed between San Marino and the newborn Kingdom of Italy. The first such treaty addressing economic issues was signed in 1865 for the introduction of the Sammarinese lira, which was equivalent to the Italian lira and fully recognized as a legal tender in both countries. Probably the most important agreement is the convention of friendship and good neighborhood that was signed in 1939, during fascism. This treaty establishes a customs union with Italy and sets out some limitations on the carrying out of certain economic activities, like tobacco cultivation, gambling, and radio broadcasting.

While San Marino is not part of the European Union, it had a customs union with it since 1991, and there is an open border between the two areas. San Marino also uses the Euro as its currency since 2000, when an agreement was signed with Italy, on behalf of the EU. A new monetary convention was signed in 2012 directly with the EU, covering a wider range of financial and monetary issues. San Marino is also allowed to mint Sammarinese Euro coins, which are printed by the Italian mint in Rome but feature a different national design than Italian Euro coins. Since they are minted in a very limited amount, they are rare and highly appreciated by coin collectors.

The main commercial partner of San Marino is Italy, with which around 88% of exports and 78% of imports take place (2017). Other important partners are the other countries of the EU, especially France and Germany.

== Companies ==
In 2022, the sector with the highest number of companies registered in San Marino is Retail Trade with 756 companies followed by Wholesale Trade and Services with 753 and 752 companies respectively.

== Coins and stamps ==
One of the sources of income from tourism comes from the sale of historic coins and stamps. In 1894, San Marino issued the first commemorative stamps and since then that has been part of a large livelihood in the republic. All 10 of the Post Offices of San Marino sell these stamps and collectible coins, including "Legal Gold Tender Coins".

Traditional economic activities in San Marino were food crops, sheep farming, and stone quarrying. Today farming activities focus on grain, vines, and orchards, as well as animal husbandry (cattle and swine).
