= List of Euro coin series =

This is a list of series of designs on the national sides of Euro coins.

== Reasons for changes ==
Changes to the design of the national sides are generally not permitted until 15 years has elapsed. As the euro came into circulation in 2002, some countries became eligible to change their designs in 2017. San Marino was the first to do so, in 2017. A 2017 change was also made in the Vatican City coin, changing from Pope Francis' portrait to his coat of arms. France revised the design of their €1 and €2 coins in 2022, the 10c, 20c, and 50c coins in 2024, and the 1c, 2c, and 5c coins in 2027. Monaco revised the design of their €1 and €2 coins in 2025. On the other hand, Belgium had violated this rule by using a new portrait of King Albert II as part of their 2008 design change, and was forced to revert to the original portrait the following year.

One major exception is for coins that depict a head of state, usually a monarch, which may change when the head of state changes. New coins for these reasons were introduced in Monaco in 2006, Belgium and the Netherlands in 2014, Spain in 2015, and Vatican City in 2005, 2006, and 2014. The 2005 Vatican City coins featured the symbols of the interregnum period, known as sede vacante, leading to a regulation banning any future design representing a vacancy or provisional occupant in regular coinage. In July 2026 new design of Vatican City coinage was issued, due to the death of Pope Francis in April 2025, with his successor Pope Leo XIV. A new design of Luxembourgish coinage was also issued following the enthronment of Grand Duke Guillaume V in October 2025, with the new monarch's likeness on coins starting in 2026.

In some cases, national sides were changed exclusively to conform to new regulations. A 2007 change in Finland was in response to the requirement for the country's name or abbreviation to appear on the coin. Changes in Belgium in 2008 were in response to the requirement for the country's name or abbreviation to appear on the coin as well as in response to a new regulation that national elements could not appear in the ring of twelve stars on the outside of the design. Finally, a change in Spain in 2010 was in response to a new regulation that national elements could not appear in the ring of twelve stars on the outside of the design.

== List ==
National designs of Euro coins
| State | Ser-ies | Years | Subject | | | | | | | | Common side |
| State | Ser-ies | Years | 1c | 2c | 5c | 10c | 20c | 50c | €1 | €2 | Common side |
|---|---|---|---|---|---|---|---|---|---|---|---|
| Andorra | 1 | 2014–present | Pyrenean chamois | | | Church of Santa Coloma | | | Casa de la Vall | Coat of arms of Andorra | revised only |
| Austria | 1 | 2002–present | Gentian | Edelweiss | Alpine primrose | St. Stephen's Cathedral | Belvedere Palace | Secession hall | Wolfgang Amadeus Mozart | Bertha von Suttner | both |
| Belgium | 1 | 1999–2007 | King Albert II | | | | | | | | both |
| Belgium | 2 | 2008 | King Albert II (revised design, new portrait) | | | | | | | | revised only |
| Belgium | 2a | 2009–2013 | King Albert II (revised design, original portrait) | | | | | | | | revised only |
| Belgium | 3 | 2014–present | King Philippe | | | | | | | | revised only |
| Bulgaria | 1 | 2026 | Madara Rider | | | | | | Saint John of Rila | Saint Paisius of Hilendar | revised only |
| Croatia | 1 | 2023–present | Motif of the letters "HR" in the Glagolitic script (ⰘⰓ) | | | Nikola Tesla | | | Marten | Map of Croatia | revised only |
| Cyprus | 1 | 2008–present | Mouflon | | | Kyrenia ship | | | Idol of Pomos | | revised only |
| Estonia | 1 | 2011–present | Map of Estonia | | | | | | | | revised only |
| Finland | 1 | 1999–2006 | Heraldic lion of Finland | | | | | | Two swans flying | Cloudberry | original only |
| Finland | 1a | 2007–present | Heraldic lion of Finland (revised) | | | | | | Two swans flying (revised) | Cloudberry (revised) | revised only |
| France | 1 | 1999–2021 | Marianne | | | La Semeuse | | | Tree in a hexagon | | both |
| France | 2 | 2022–2023 | Marianne | | | La Semeuse | | | Tree in a hexagon (revised) | | revised only |
| France | 2 | 2024–2026 | Marianne | | | Simone Veil and La Semeuse | Josephine Baker and La Semeuse | Marie Curie and La Semeuse | Tree in a hexagon (revised) | | revised only |
| France | 2 | 2027 (presumptive) | Victor Hugo | | | Simone Veil and La Semeuse | Josephine Baker and La Semeuse | Marie Curie and La Semeuse | Tree in a hexagon (revised) | | revised only |
| Germany | 1 | 2002–present | Oak twig | | | Brandenburg Gate | | | Bundesadler | | both |
| Greece | 1 | 2002–present | Athenian trireme | Corvette | Modern tanker | Rigas Feraios | Ioannis Kapodistrias | Eleftherios Venizelos | Drachma coin of Athens | Abduction of Europa | both |
| (Republic of Ireland) Ireland | 1 | 2002–present | Celtic harp | | | | | | | | both |
| Italy | 1 | 2002–present | Castel del Monte | Mole Antonelliana | Colosseum | Face of Venus from The Birth of Venus | Unique Forms of Continuity in Space | Statue of Marcus Aurelius | Vitruvian Man | Dante Alighieri | both |
| Latvia | 1 | 2014–present | Lesser coat of arms of Latvia | | | Greater coat of arms of Latvia | | | Latvian maiden | | revised only |
| Lithuania | 1 | 2015–present | Vytis | | | | | | | | revised only |
| Luxembourg | 1 | 2002–2025 | Grand Duke Henri | | | | | | | | both |
| Luxembourg | 2 | 2026 | Grand Duke Guillaume V | | | | | | | | revised only |
| Malta | 1 | 2008–present | Mnajdra temple altar | | | Coat of arms of Malta | | | Maltese cross | | revised only |
| Monaco | 1 | 2001–2005 | Coat of arms of Monaco | | | Seal of Monaco | | | Prince Rainier III and Prince Albert II | Prince Rainier III | original only |
| Monaco | 2 | 2006–2024 | Coat of arms of Monaco (revised) | | | Monogram of Prince Albert II | | | Prince Albert II | | both |
| Monaco | 3 | 2025–present | Coat of arms of Monaco (revised) | | | Monogram of Prince Albert II | | | Prince Albert II (revised) | | revised only |
| Netherlands | 1 | 1999–2013 | Queen Beatrix | | | | | | | | both |
| Netherlands | 2 | 2014–present | King Willem-Alexander | | | | | | | | revised only |
| Portugal | 1 | 2002–present | Royal seal of 1134 | | | Royal seal of 1142 | | | Royal seal of 1144 | | both |
| San Marino | 1 | 2002–2016 | Montale | Statua della Libertà | Guaita | Basilica of Saint Marinus | Saint Marinus | Three Towers of San Marino | Coat of arms of San Marino | Palazzo Pubblico | both |
| San Marino | 2 | 2017–present | Coat of arms of San Marino | San Marino's city gate | Church of Saint Quirinus | Church of San Francesco | Monte Titano and the three towers | Portrait of San Marinus by Emilio Retrosi | Cesta | The Portrait of San Marinus | revised only |
| Slovakia | 1 | 2009–present | Kriváň | | | Bratislava Castle | | | Double cross on three hills | | revised only |
| Slovenia | 1 | 2007–present | Stork | Prince's stone | The Sower | Jože Plečnik's idea for the national parliament building | Pair of Lipizzaner horses | Triglav, Cancer, and song "Oj Triglav moj dom" | Primož Trubar | France Prešeren | both |
| Spain | 1 | 1999–2009 | Cathedral of Santiago de Compostela | | | Miguel de Cervantes | | | King Juan Carlos I | | both |
| Spain | 2 | 2010–2014 | Cathedral of Santiago de Compostela (revised) | | | Miguel de Cervantes (revised) | | | King Juan Carlos I (revised) | | revised only |
| Spain | 3 | 2015–present | Cathedral of Santiago de Compostela (revised) | | | Miguel de Cervantes (revised) | | | King Felipe VI | | revised only |
| Vatican City | 1 | 2002–2005 | Pope John Paul II | | | | | | | | original only |
| Vatican City | 2 | 2005 | Coat of arms of the camerlengo of the Holy Roman Church Eduardo Martínez Somalo | | | | | | | | original only |
| Vatican City | 3 | 2006–2013 | Pope Benedict XVI | | | | | | | | both |
| Vatican City | 4 | 2014–2016 | Pope Francis | | | | | | | | revised only |
| Vatican City | 5 | 2017–2025 | Coat of arms of Pope Francis | | | | | | | | revised only |
| Vatican City | 6 | 2026 | Coat of arms of Pope Leo XIV | | | Pope Leo XIV | | | | | revised only |
