= 50 euro cent coin =

Coin with value of one-half of a euro

50 euro cent
- Eurozone (mainly) and other countries
- Value: 0.50 euro
- Mass: 7.80 g
- Diameter: 24.25 mm
- Thickness: 2.38 mm
- Edge: regular, fine indentations, 50 reeds
- Composition: Nordic gold
- Years of minting: 1999–present

Obverse
- Design: Numerous variations, see below.
- Designer: Various
- Design date: Various

Reverse
- Design: Map of Europe with the denomination shown in Latin characters
- Designer: Luc Luycx
- Design date: 2007
- Design: Map of the 15 EU countries of 1999 with the denomination shown in Latin characters
- Designer: Luc Luycx
- Design date: 1999
- Design discontinued: 2007 (still in circulation as of 2025)

The 50 euro cent coin (€0.50) has a value of half a euro and is composed of an alloy called nordic gold. All euro coins have a common reverse side and country-specific national sides. The coin has been used since 2002, with the present common-side design dating from 2007.

== History ==
The coin dates from 2002, when euro coins and banknotes were introduced in the then 12-member eurozone and its related territories. Despite this, the coins of some countries were issued beginning in 1999. The common side was designed by Luc Luycx, a Belgian artist who won a Europe-wide competition to design the new coins. The designs of the 10 to 50-cent coins were intended to show separate states of the European Union (EU), as opposed to the one and two-euro coins showing the 15 states as one and the 1 to 5-cent coins showing the EU's place in the world.

The national sides, then 15 (eurozone and Monaco, San Marino and the Vatican who could mint their own), were each designed according to national competitions, though to specifications which applied to all coins such as the requirement of including twelve stars (see euro coins for more). National designs were not allowed to change until the end of 2008, unless a monarch (whose portrait usually appears on the coins) died or abdicated. This happened in Monaco and the Vatican City resulting in three new designs in circulation (the Vatican had an interim sede vacante design until the new Pope was elected). However, starting in 2007, some national designs underwent minor changes due to regulations requiring national designs to meet a series of specifications.

As the EU's membership has since expanded in 2004 and 2007, with further expansions envisaged, the common faces of all euro coins from the value of 10 cent and above were redesigned in 2007 to show a new map. This map showed Europe, not just the EU, as one continuous landmass; however, Cyprus was moved west as the map cut off after the Bosporus (which was seen as excluding Turkey for political reasons). The redesign in 2007, rather than in 2004, was because 2007 saw the first enlargement of the eurozone: the entry of Slovenia. Hence, the Slovenian design was added to the designs in circulation. Two more designs were added in 2008 with the entry of Cyprus and Malta and another one in 2009 with Slovakia. Four more were added in 2011, 2014, 2015, and 2023, for Estonia, Latvia, Lithuania, and Croatia, respectively. Andorra began minting its own designs in 2014 after winning the right to do so.

== Design ==
Edge of all 50 euro cent coins

The coins are composed of an alloy called Nordic gold, with a diameter of 24.25 mm, a 2.38 mm thickness and a mass of 7.80 grams. The coins' edges have regular indentations. The coins have been used from 2002, though some are dated 1999 which is the year the euro was created as a currency, but not put into general circulation.

=== Reverse (common) side ===
The reverse (used from 2007 onwards) was designed by Luc Luycx and displays a map of Europe on the left. The map does not include Iceland and cuts off on the right through Russia (exactly, at a line from the Kandalaksha Gulf to the Bosphorus (Cyprus is moved westward under Crete in order to include it and Malta is shown as disproportionally large so that it shows up). The map is flat and level with most of the coin and the sea is shown as an indentation. Six fine lines cut through the sea, breaking when passing through the map, and at their ends at the top and bottom are twelve stars (reflective of the flag of Europe). To the right, in raised lettering, is "50 Euro Cent" with the '50' being shown much larger than the words. The designer's initials, LL, appear next to the 0 in 50.

Luc Luycx designed the original coin, which was much the same except the design was only of the then 15 members and shown with gaps between the states and raised rather than with an indented sea.

Starting in 2025 coins from individual member states have started adjusting their common side design to a new version, identified by smaller and more rounded numeral "5" and longer lines outside of the stars at the coin's circumference.

=== Obverse (national) sides ===
The obverse side of the coin depends on the issuing country. All have to include the name or an abbreviation of the issuing country. The national side of circulation coins shall bear a circle of 12 stars that shall fully surround the national design, including the year mark and the indication of the issuing Member State’s name. The side cannot repeat the denomination of the coin unless the issuing country uses an alphabet other than Latin. Currently, Greece, Cyprus and Bulgaria are the only such countries. Greece engraves "50 ΛΕΠΤΑ" (50 lepta) on its coins and Bulgaria engraves "СТОТИНКИ" (stotinki). Austria ignores this rule, engraving "50 EURO CENT" on its coins, hence will have to change its design to comply this rule.

Belgium, Finland, France, the Netherlands and Spain minted coins dated 1999, 2000 and 2001 although these entered circulation in 2002. Monaco minted coins dated 2001 although these entered circulation in 2002 too.

State	Details	Years of minting (years shown)	Image
(Andorra) Andorran euro coins	The Church of Santa Coloma d'Andorra. It features the word "Andorra" and the year of minting written vertically on the right-hand side.	2014 onwards	
(Austria) Austrian euro coins	The Secession Building within a circle, symbolising the birth of Art Nouveau and a new age in the country. The denomination, followed by a hatched Austrian flag and the date, appears above but within the circle.	2002 onwards	
(Belgium) Belgian euro coins	FIRST SERIES: An effigy of King Albert II. To the right hand side among the stars was the King's monogram, a letter "A", underneath a crown. The year is lower down, also among the stars.	1999–2007	
(Belgium) Belgian euro coins	SECOND SERIES: A redesign to include the letters BE (standing for Belgium) beneath the monogram, which was moved out of the stars into the centre circle but still to the right of the King's renewed portrait. The date was also moved out and placed beneath the effigy and included two symbols either side (left: signature mark of the master of the mint, right: mint mark). This portrait did not comply with previous decisions by the ECOFIN in 2005 and 2008. Therefore, an amendment was made in 2009, which reverted to the portrait of Albert II found in the first series. Mint marks, year and stars remained the same.	2008–2013	
(Belgium) Belgian euro coins	THIRD SERIES: In 2013, Albert II abdicated with Philippe of Belgium becoming King. He subsequently replaced Albert on Belgian coins.	2014 onwards	
(Bulgaria) Bulgarian euro coins	A relief image of the Madara Horseman. The design also includes the year of issuance, the inscription “БЪЛГАРИЯ” (the country’s name in Bulgarian) and the word “СТОТИНКИ” (“CENT”) in Cyrillic script.	2026 onwards	
(Croatia) Croatian euro coins	Silhouette portrait of Nikola Tesla encircled by magnetic field lines and a checkerboard in the background.	2023 onwards	
(Cyprus) Cypriot euro coins	A Kyrenia ship, a 4th-century BCE trading vessel symbolising the seafaring and trading history of Cyprus. It includes, in a semicircle to the top right, the name of Cyprus in Greek and Turkish (ΚΥΠΡΟΣ and KIBRIS) each side of the date.	2008 onwards	
(Estonia) Estonian euro coins	A geographical image of Estonia and the word “Eesti” (“Estonia”).	2011 onwards	
(Finland) Finnish euro coins	The heraldic lion of Finland found on the Coat of arms of Finland. It is a reproduction of a design by the sculptor Heikki Häiväoja and has been used by previous Finnish coins such as the 1 markka between 1964 and 2001. The first series included the initial of the mint master of the Mint of Finland, Raimo Makkonen (an M), on the bottom left side of the lion and the date to the left. In 2007, the initial was replaced by the mint's mint mark and the letters FI (for Finland) were included on the right hand side of the horizon. Finland again amended the design of its coins in the 2008 issue, repositioning the mint mark and putting it on the inside of the coin.	1999 onwards	
(France) French euro coins	FIRST SERIES: A sower in a field with a rising sun behind her. The image is taken from the previous one French franc coin designed by Louis Oscar Roty. Oscar Roty's Art Nouveau design reset the global trend, breaking from traditional static portraits to a full body, strident figure sowing the seeds of good fortune. For the euro coins, Jorio added hatching each side representing the French flag with the year to the left and the letters RF (République française) to the right.	1999–2023	
(France) French euro coins	SECOND SERIES: The coin features a portrait of Nobel Prize-winning scientist Marie Curie, known for her pioneering work on radioactivity. The sower also appears, depicted in a smaller size.	2024 onwards	
(Germany) German euro coins	The Brandenburg Gate as a symbol of the reunification of Germany and Europe. The year and mint mark is shown at the bottom.	2002 onwards	
(Greece) Greek euro coins	A portrait of Eleftherios Venizelos (1864–1936), a major Greek politician and who pioneered social reform, modernisation of Greece and the liberation of northern Greece and the Aegean. His name in Greek is shown to the bottom right of the portrait and to the left is the denomination in Greek with the year.	2002 onwards	
(Republic of Ireland) Irish euro coins	The national emblem of Ireland, an Irish harp (the Cláirseach, see Clàrsach). Vertically on the left hand side is the word "Éire" (Ireland in the Irish language) and on the right hand side is the date. The harp motif was designed by Jarlath Hayes.	2002 onwards	
(Italy) Italian euro coins	A depiction of the Equestrian Statue of Marcus Aurelius, one of the "Five Good Emperors", in Rome. It includes the interconnected letters IR (Repubblica Italiana), the year is shown centered on the bottom and the mint mark are shown to the bottom right of the statue.	2002 onwards	
(Latvia) Latvian euro coins	The coat of arms of the Republic of Latvia above the word LATVIJA (Latvia).	2014 onwards	
(Lithuania) Lithuanian euro coins	The Vytis (symbol of the coat-of-arms) and the word “Lietuva”, which means “Lithuania”. The twelve stars, symbols of the EU, surrounds the Vytis.	2015 onwards	
(Luxembourg) Luxembourgish euro coins	FIRST SERIES: A stylised effigy of Grand Duke Henri of Luxembourg. The name "LËTZEBUERG" (Luxembourg in Luxembourgish) and the year is written round the outer left side of the coin.	2002–2025	
(Luxembourg) Luxembourgish euro coins	SECOND SERIES: On the right, the effigy of Grand Duke Guillaume looking towards the left. Facing the effigy, a stylised version of the Luxembourg flag is depicted on the left side of the coin. The word "LËTZEBUERG" indicates the issuing country in a semi-circular upward direction to the left of the flag. The year-date appears at the bottom right of the effigy in a diagonal upward reading.	2026 onwards	
(Malta) Maltese euro coins	The Coat of arms of Malta, which includes the Maltese flag and a mural crown of fortifications symbolising a city state. Shield of the arms is bound by an olive branch and a palm branch as Maltese symbols of peace, tied at their base by a ribbon reading “Repubblika ta’ Malta” (Republic of Malta). The name Malta sits round the upper left inner edge and the year in a similar fashion on the right.	2008 onwards	
(Monaco) Monégasque euro coins	FIRST SERIES: The seal of Monaco with the name MONACO was written across the top of the coin's outer circle and the year across the bottom of the outer circle with the mint marks.	2001–2005	
(Monaco) Monégasque euro coins	SECOND SERIES: Upon the death of Prince Rainier III in 2005, and the accession of Prince Albert II the seal was replaced with the monogram of Prince Albert II and the name Monaco and the year were brought within the inner circle.	2006 onwards	
(Netherlands) Dutch euro coins	FIRST SERIES: A stylised profile of Queen Beatrix of the Netherlands surrounded by the twelve stars and other dots, with the inscription “Beatrix Queen of The Netherlands” in Dutch around the edge. The date and mint marks are located at the bottom.	1999–2013	
(Netherlands) Dutch euro coins	SECOND SERIES: Following the accession to the throne of King Willem-Alexander, a new series of euro coins was issued depicting the effigy of the new Dutch King.	2014 onwards	
(Portugal) Portuguese euro coins	The royal seal of 1142 surrounded by the country's castles and five escutcheona with silver bezants set in relation to the surrounding European stars which is supposed to symbolise dialogue, exchange of values and dynamics in the building of Europe. Between the castles are the numbers of the year towards the bottom and the letters of the name Portugal between the upper icons. The stars are inset on a ridge.	2002 onwards	
(San Marino) Sammarinese euro coins	FIRST SERIES: The Three Towers of San Marino: La Guaita, La Cesta, Il Montale. In a semicircle over the towers is the date, the words San Marino and the mint marks.	2002–2016	
(San Marino) Sammarinese euro coins	SECOND SERIES: A portrait of Saint Marino from a detail of a painting by Emilio Retrosi.	2017 onwards	
(Slovakia) Slovak euro coins	Bratislava Castle, with the national emblem in the bottom left of the picture. Below the image is the date and curving just above the circling stars is the name SLOVENSKO (Slovakia).	2009 onwards	
(Slovenia) Slovenian euro coins	Triglav mountain below the constellation of Cancer (Slovenia achieved independence under the zodiac sign of Cancer). In a semicircle above that are two lines of text, the outer one reading SLOVENIJA (Slovenia) between the twelve stars and the inner one reading "Oj Triglav moj dom" (O Triglav, My Home) from the patriotic song by Jakob Aljaž, a Slovene priest, composer and mountaineer.	2007 onwards	
(Spain) Spanish euro coins	FIRST SERIES: An effigy of Miguel de Cervantes, the father of Spanish literature. His name and a quill is shown to the left, the name España (Spain) above it and the mint mark below. The date is shown at the bottom of the coin. The top right four stars are indented on a raised area, inverting the effect of the rest of the coin.	1999–2009	
(Spain) Spanish euro coins	SECOND SERIES: In 2010 the raised area around the stars was removed.	2010 onwards	
(Vatican City) Vatican euro coins	FIRST SERIES: An effigy of Pope John Paul II. The name CITTA DEL VATICANO (Vatican City), followed by the year and mint mark, was written in a break between the stars below.	2002–2005	
(Vatican City) Vatican euro coins	SECOND SERIES: Following the death of Pope John Paul II in 2005, a new coin was issued during the Sede vacante until a new Pope was chosen. This contained the insignia of the Apostolic Chamber and the coat of arms of the Cardinal Chamberlain.	2005	
(Vatican City) Vatican euro coins	THIRD SERIES: When Pope Benedict XVI was elected, his effigy appeared on the coins, with the name of the city now broken to his top right with the year and mint mark in the middle to his right.	2006–2013	
(Vatican City) Vatican euro coins	FOURTH SERIES: In 2014, the coins were updated with the election of Pope Francis. CITTA DEL VATICANO is written around the top, broken by Pope Francis' head, with the date below the O in Vaticano.	2014–2016	
(Vatican City) Vatican euro coins	FIFTH SERIES: After the announcement that Pope Francis would not appear on any coins issued by the Vatican City, a new series of euro coins were issued to depict the papal coat of arms of Pope Francis.	2017–2025	
(Vatican City) Vatican euro coins	SIXTH SERIES: Effigy of Leo XIV.	2026 onwards	

==== Potential designs ====
Austria, Germany and Greece will also at some point need to update their designs to comply with guidelines stating they must include the issuing state's name or initial, and not repeat the denomination of the coin (Austria only). On the other hand, Slovenia and Greece have to comply with the star rule.

In addition, there are several EU states that have not yet adopted the euro, some of them have already agreed upon their coin designs however it is not yet known exactly when they will adopt the currency, and hence these are not yet minted. See enlargement of the Eurozone for expected entry dates of these countries.
