= San Marino euro coins =

Overview of Sammarinese coin designs

Eurozone participation European Union member states (special territories not shown) 21 in the eurozone 1 in ERM II, with an opt-out (Denmark) 5 not in ERM II, but committed to join the eurozone after meeting the convergence criteria (Czech Republic, Hungary, Poland, Romania, and Sweden) Non–EU member states 4 using the euro with a monetary agreement (Andorra, Monaco, San Marino, and Vatican City) 2 using the euro unilaterally (Kosovo and Montenegro)

Sammarinese euro coins feature separate designs for every coin. The Sammarinese euro coins are minted by Istituto Poligrafico e Zecca dello Stato (IPZS), in Rome, Italy. The euro is the official currency of San Marino, although San Marino is not a member of the eurozone or the European Union. All coins are inscribed with the word "San Marino", the year of issue and the twelve stars of Europe.

== Sammarinese euro design ==
=== First series (2002–2016) ===
For images of the common side and a detailed description of the coins, see euro coins.

Depiction of Sammarinese euro coinage (2002–2016) | Obverse side
€ 0.01	€ 0.02	€ 0.05
Third tower (Montale).	Statua della Libertà	First tower (Guaita).
€ 0.10	€ 0.20	€ 0.50
Basilica di San Marino	Saint Marinus inspired by a painting of the school of Guercino.	Three Towers of San Marino (La Guaita, La Cesta, Il Montale).
€ 1.00	€ 2.00	€ 2 Coin Edge
		for a total of 12 stars
Coat of arms of the Republic of San Marino	Palazzo Pubblico	for a total of 12 stars

=== Second series (2017–present) ===
Depiction of Sammarinese euro coinage (2017–present) | Obverse side
€ 0.01	€ 0.02	€ 0.05
The Coat of arms of the Republic of San Marino. no circulating coins minted	San Marino's city gate. no circulating coins minted	Church of Saint Quirinus. no circulating coins minted
€ 0.10	€ 0.20	€ 0.50
Chiesa di San Francesco (Church of Saint Francis) no circulating coins minted.	Monte Titano and the three towers.	Detail from the portrait of San Marino by late 19th century artist Emilio Retrosi.
€ 1.00	€ 2.00	€ 2 Coin Edge
		for a total of 12 stars
La Cesta, the second tower from a group of towers located on the three peaks of Mount Titano (Monte Titano) in the city of San Marino, the capital of the Republic.	Detail from the painting The Portrait of San Marino by Giovanni Battista Urbinelli.	for a total of 12 stars

== Circulating mintage quantities ==
Face Value	€0.01	€0.02	€0.05	€0.10	€0.20	€0.50	€1.00	€2.00
2002	s	s	s	120,000	147,400	75,400	205,800	100,760
2003	s	s	s	s	220,000	205,800	s	s
2004	1,360,000	1,395,000	1,000,000	210,000	s	s	s	s
2005	s	s	s	s	160,000	179,712	s	s
2006	s	s	2,730,000	s	s	193,880	s	s
2007	s	s	s	s	s	315,000	s	s
2008	s	s	s	s	1,168,360	1,350,000	s	s
2009	s	s	s	s	s	s	1,096,672	s
2010	s	s	s	s	s	s	996,134	s
2011	s	s	s	s	s	s	s	631,931
2012	s	s	s	s	s	s	s	621,249
2013	s	s	s	s	100,000	100,000	424,205	527,624
2014	s	s	s	s	s	723,275	1,517,500	s
2015	s	s	s	s	50,000	750,001	1,675,600	s
2016	s	s	s	s	200,000	s	s	874,064
2017	s	s	s	s	1,328,015	s	500,000	600,000
2018	s	s	s	s	600,000	1,100,000	1,100,000	s
2019	s	s	s	s	s	800,000	500,000	607,331
s Small quantities minted for sets only

== Commemorative coins ==
Year	Subject	Volume

== Scudo ==
In the monetary agreement between San Marino and Italy, later renegotiated directly with the European Union, the right of the Republic of San Marino to continue issuing gold coins denominated in scudi is established. These coins will not be legal tender in the European Union.

== See also ==
- San Marino–European Union relations
- Sammarinese lira
