= List of museums in San Marino =

This is a list of museums in San Marino.

== National museum ==
Image	Museum	Website
	Museo di stato di San Marino	Museo di Stato
	Museo San Francesco	Museo San Francesco
	Palazzo Pubblico	Palazzo Pubblico
	Prima Torre	Prima Torre
	Seconda Torre / Sammarinese Museum of Ancient Arms	Seconda Torre / Museo delle armi antiche di San Marino
	Galleria di arte moderna e contemporanea	Galleria di arte moderna e contemporanea

== Other museums ==
Torture Museum

- Museo delle Cere
- Sammarinese Museum of Ancient Arms
- Torture Museum
- Museo storico della federazione balestrieri sammarinesi
- Museo della civiltà contadina e delle tradizioni della Repubblica di San Marino
- Museo delle curiosità
- Reptilarium-aquarium di San Marino
- Le macchine di Leonardo da Vinci
