= Torture Museum (San Marino) =

Museum in the City of San Marino, San Marino

- Museo Della Tortura
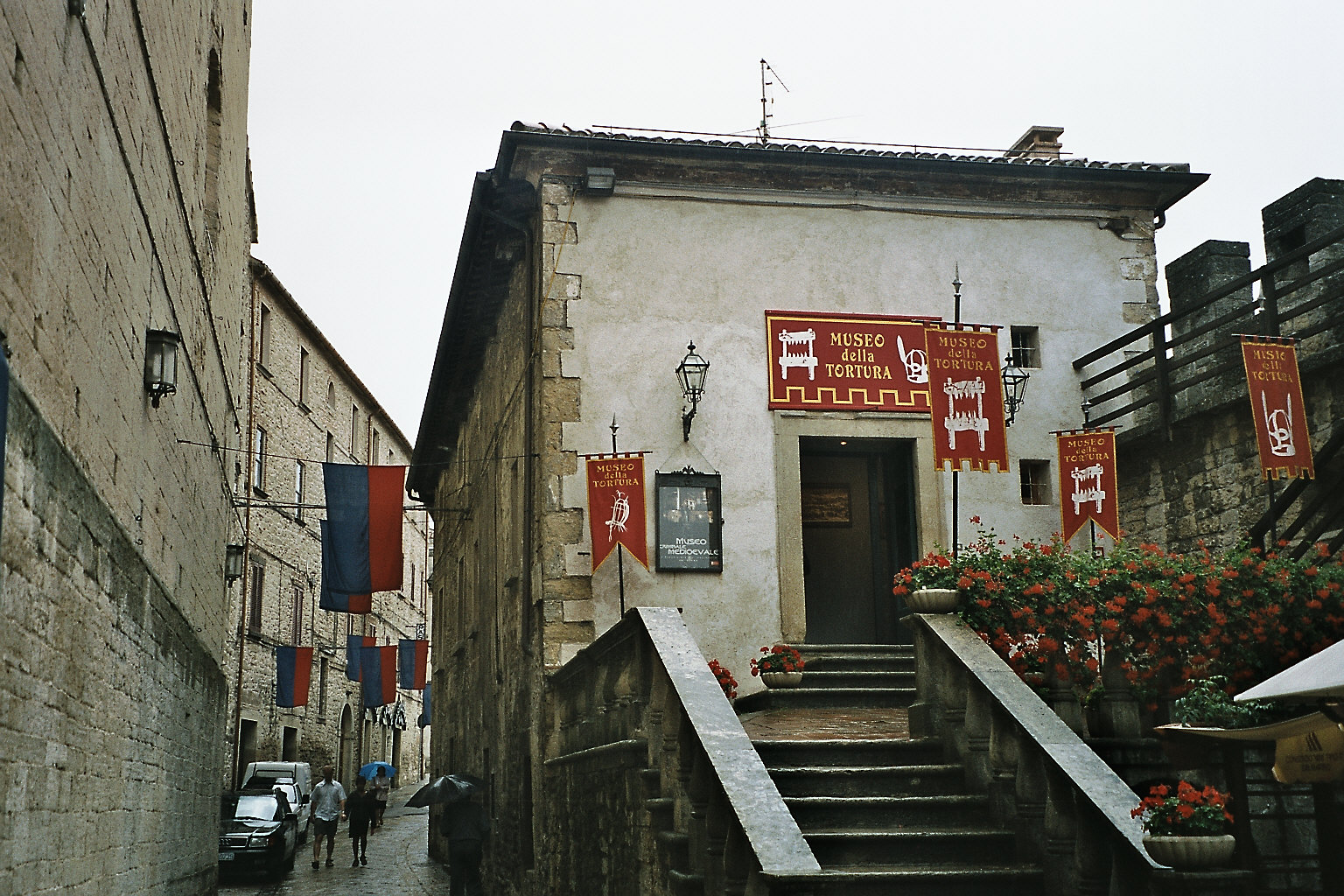
- Established: 1966
- Location: City of San Marino, San Marino
- Coordinates: 43°56′06.7″N 12°26′49.1″E
- Type: museum
- Website: Official website (in Italian)

The Torture Museum (Italian: Museo Della Tortura) is a museum in the City of San Marino, San Marino.

== History ==
The museum was established in 1966.

== Exhibitions ==
The museum exhibits more than 100 tools for torture and punishments to people suspected of crimes, witchcraft or conspiracy. Many of the tools are the original tools used in the 16-17th century and some are the reconstructed ones from the original tools.

== See also ==
- List of museums in San Marino
