= Sammarinese Museum of Ancient Arms =

Coordinates: 43.9330°N 12.4517°E

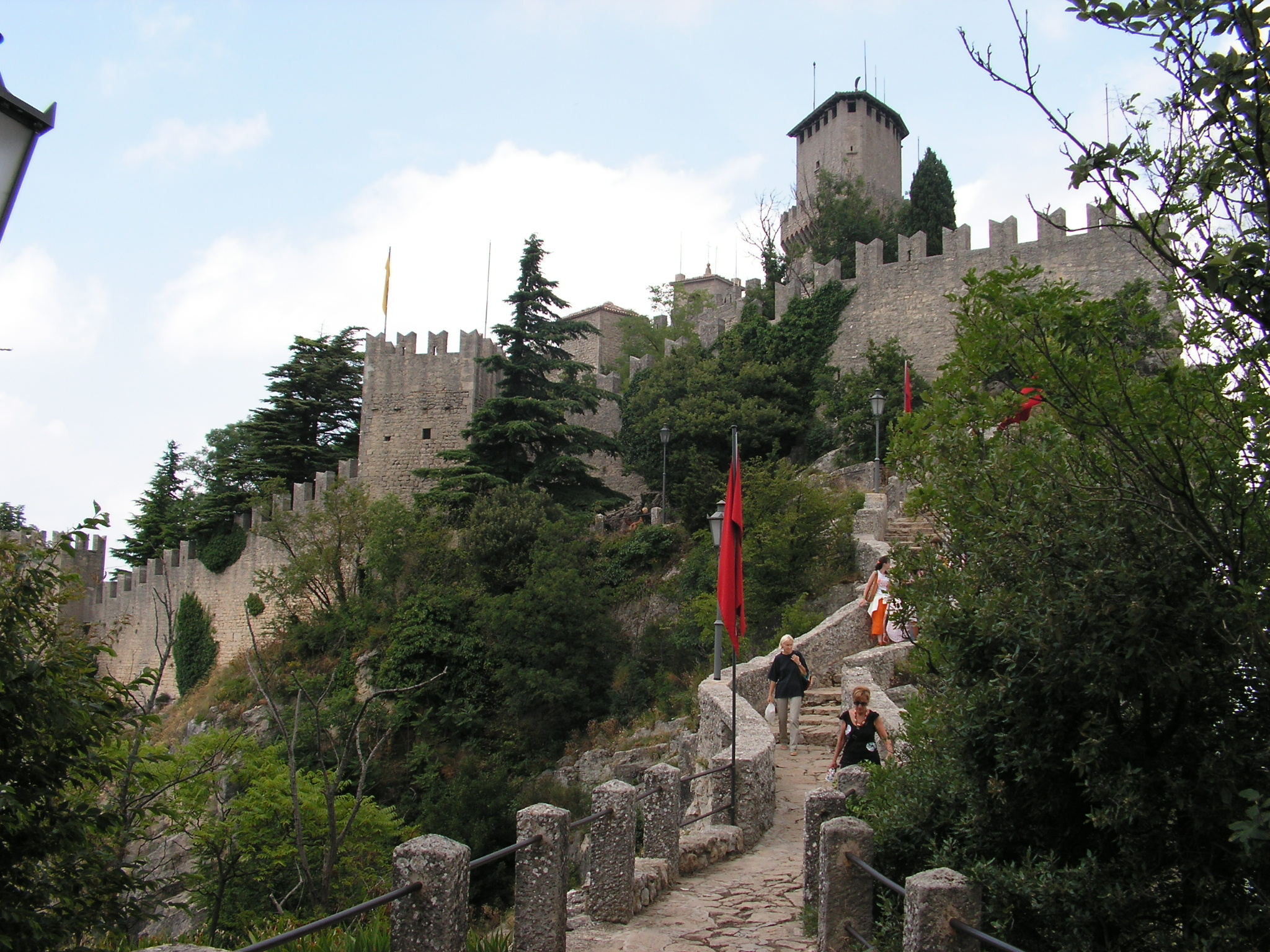
- Interactive map of the Sammarinese Museum of Ancient Arms area

General information
- Type: Military
- Location: San Marino
- Completed: 1956

Sammarinese Museum of Ancient Arms (Museo delle armi antiche di San Marino in Italian) is located in the Cesta, the second tower of San Marino. The museum opened in 1956 due to agreement with Sammarinese collector Giovanni Carlo Giorgetti. Exhibition, divided to four rooms, contains about 2000 ancient arms and armours. It is part of the Musei di Stato.
