= Cesta, San Marino =

Tower in San Marino

Coordinates: 43.9328°N 12.4515°E

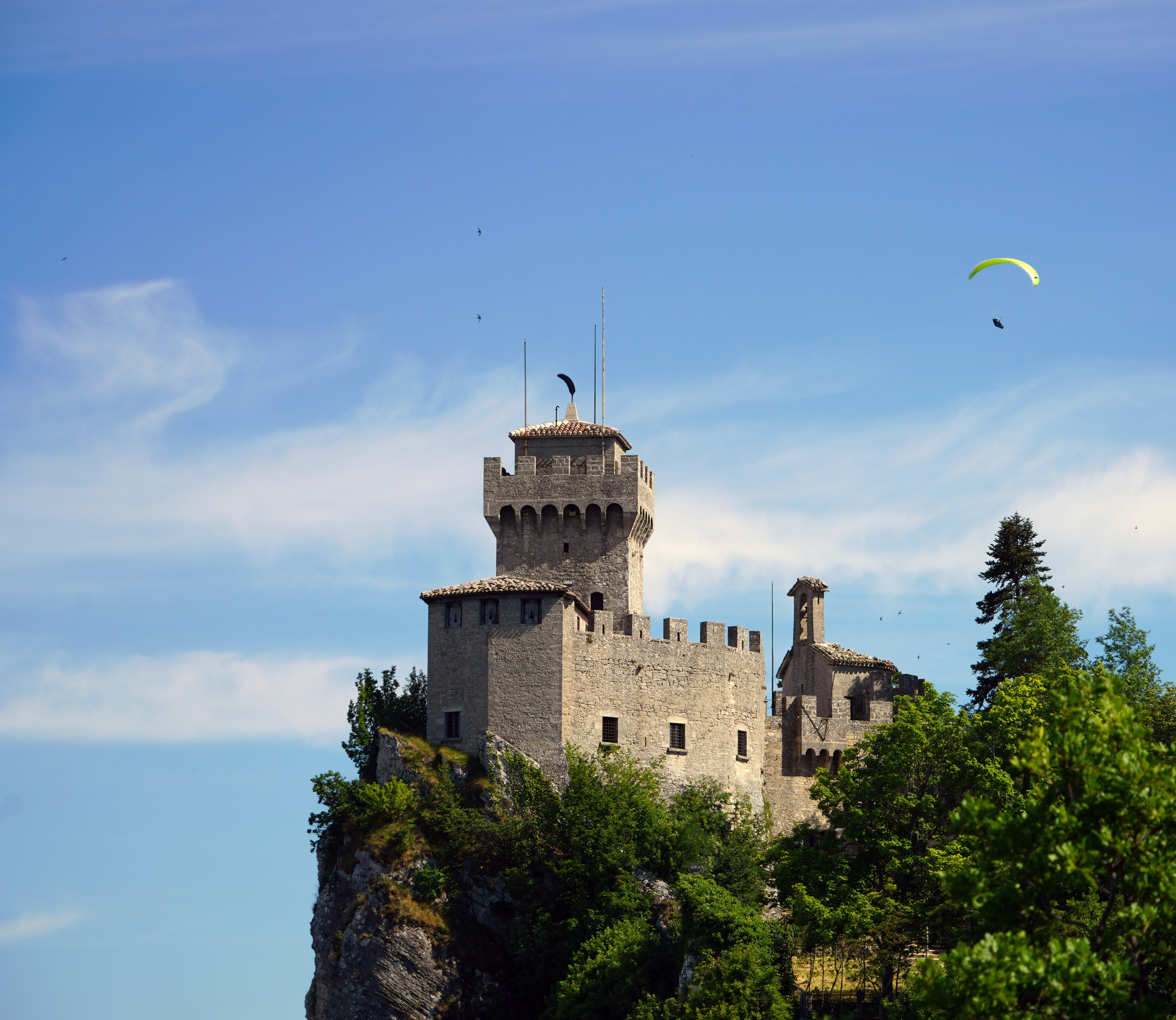
Cesta tower

== Overview ==
The tower is located on the highest of Monte Titano's summits sitting about 756 meters. It was built at the end of the 11th century and followed a pentagonal plan. The main tower houses a guardhouse and some jail cells. A museum to honor Saint Marinus, created in 1956, is located in this tower and showcases over 1,550 weapons dating from the medieval era to the modern day. The museum contains the sword supposedly given to San Marino by Giuseppe Garibaldi after taking shelter in the republic while fleeing Austrian forces after the fall of the Roman Republic. The tower is an important part of Sammarinese history, and was constructed on the remains of an older Roman fort.

It is one of the three towers depicted on both the national flag and coat of arms.

== See also ==
- Guaita (1st tower)
- Montale (3rd tower)
- Three Towers of San Marino
- City of San Marino
- Sammarinese Museum of Ancient Arms
- Geographic data related to Cesta, San Marino at OpenStreetMap
