= Museo delle Cere (San Marino) =

Wax museum in city of San Marino, San Marino

Coordinates: 43°56′7.3″N 12°26′55.5″E

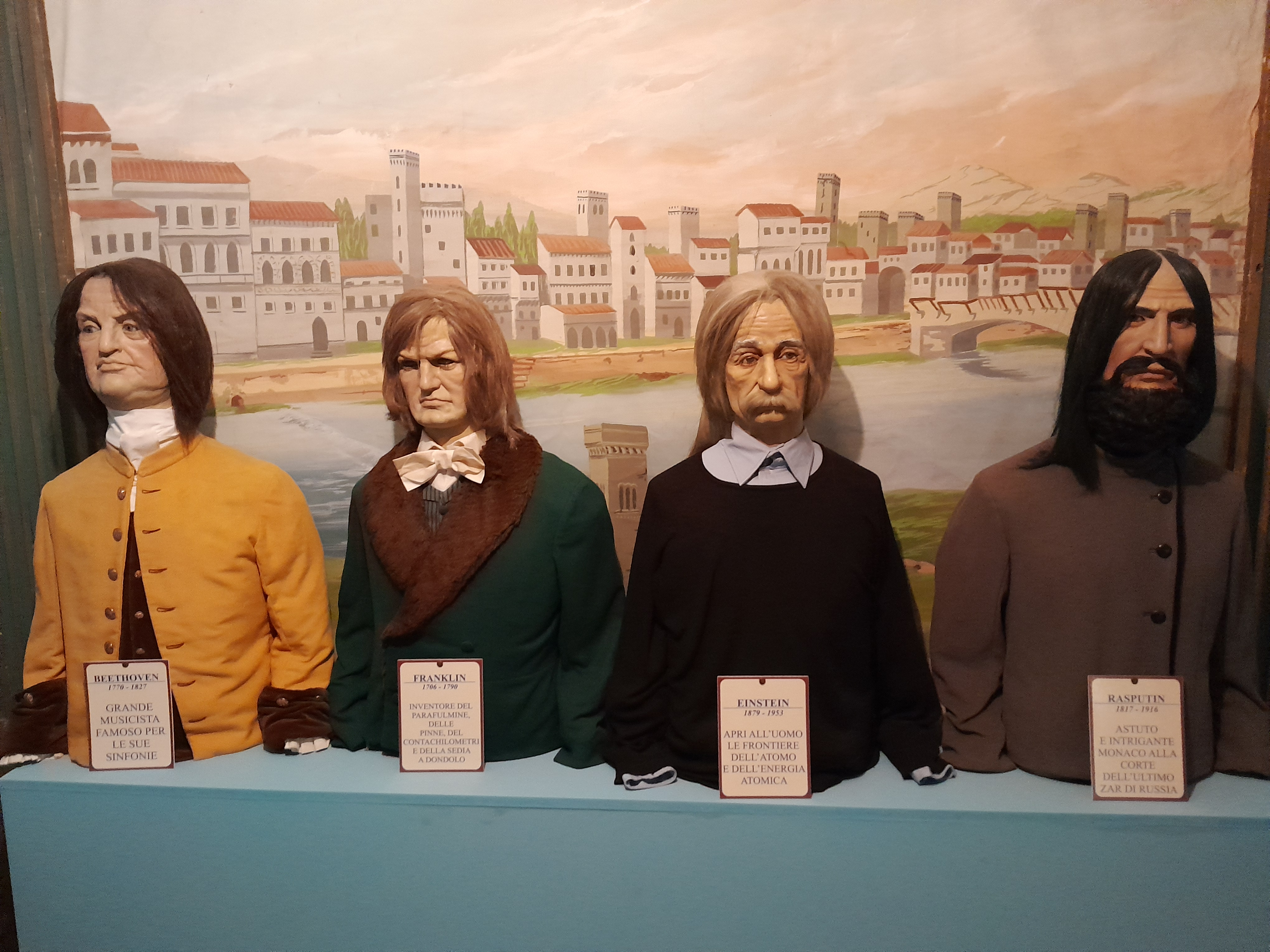
Exhibits

Museo delle Cere is a wax museum in the City of San Marino, San Marino. Opened in 1966, it was the first private museum in the country.
