= Flag of San Marino =

San Marino
- Use: National flag and ensign
- Proportion: 3:4
- Adopted: Early 1800s (standardised on 22 July 2011)
- Design: A horizontal bicolour of white and light blue; charged with the national coat of arms in the centre.
- Use: Civil flag and ensign
- Proportion: 3:4
- Design: Plain horizontal white-blue bicolour.

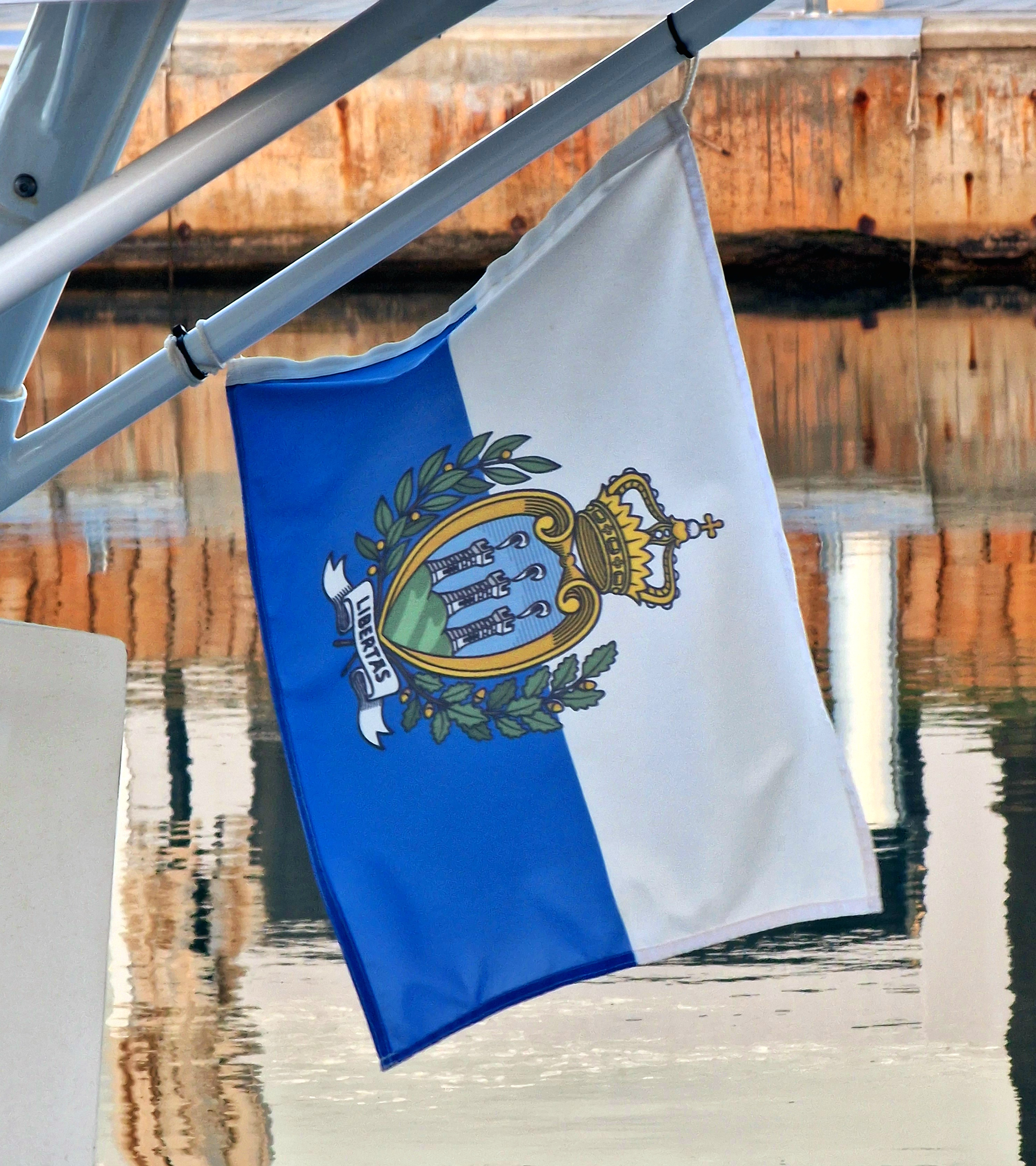
Flag of San Marino on a boat in Spain.

The national flag of San Marino is formed by two equal horizontal bands of white (top) and light blue with the national coat of arms superimposed in the center; the coat of arms has a shield (featuring three towers on three peaks) with a closed crown on top, flanked by an oak and laurel wreath, with a scroll below bearing the word LIBERTAS (Freedom). The two colours of the flag represent peace (white) and liberty (light blue).

Although the Law on the flag and coat of arms of San Marino from 22 July 2011 refers only to the "official flag" of the republic, a de facto civil flag, which omits the coat of arms, can sometimes be seen flying. Some official sources of San Marino suggest that the civil flag is actually the bicolour with the coat of arms of the specific city it is used in, instead of the national one.

The national ensign of San Marino is identical to the state flag.

San Marino's municipalities all have flags that are very similar to San Marino's national flag. These flags all contain a shield-like emblem on the horizontal white and blue bicolour. Closest to the hoist of these flags is the name of the municipality written vertically.

== History ==
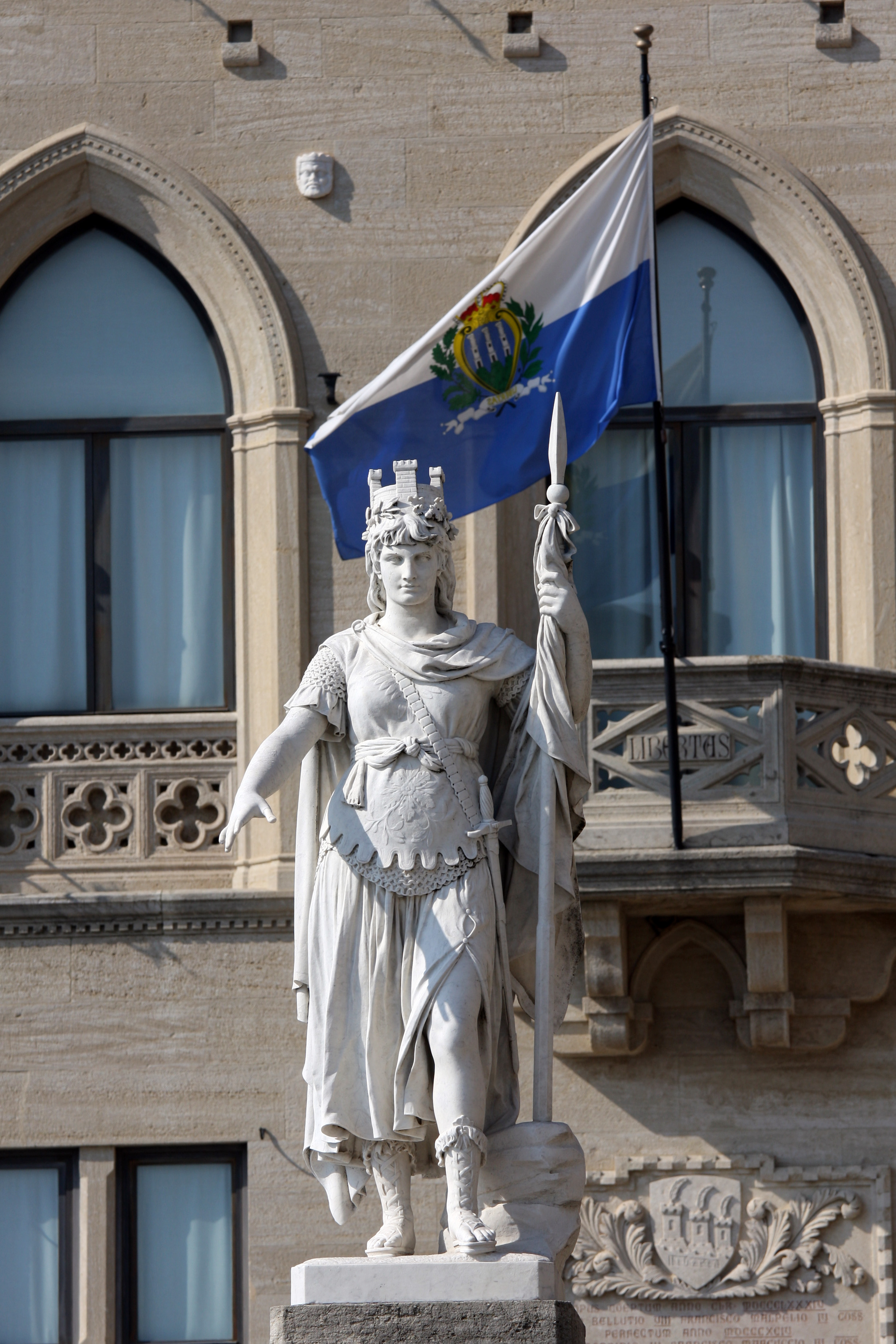
The San Marino flag behind the Statua della Libertà, 2009. It shows a pre-2011 standardisation flag

The oldest attested standard of the republic dates back from 4 September 1465, when it was commissioned from a manufacturer in Florence, allegedly composed of a tricolour of gold, white and "alessandrino" (thought to be purple, recently re-interpreted as a shade of azure).

In 1797, most likely influenced by the wave of reforms in France, the Supreme Council of the Republic commissioned a white and blue cockade, which, coincidentally or not, was identical to the one used by the French revolutionaries.

The decree of 6 April 1862 standardized the coat of arms, but did not mention the flag.

Flag	Year	Description
	1465	Battle standard. Hypothetical reconstruction according to Malagola.
	1465	Battle standard. Hypothetical reconstruction according to Casali.
	1829	Flag hoisted at the Guaita. First record of the use of a white-azure bicolour.
	Early 1800s–2011	A typical unstandardised flag used before 2011.
	2011–present	A horizontal bicolour of white and light blue; charged with the national coat of arms in the centre.

== Proportions and colours ==
The official proportion of the flag is 3:4, the coat of arms' width being 3/8 of the flag's length. While the arms are horizontally centered, their vertical position on the flag is defined by the location of the center of the cross on top of the crown: at 1/8 of the flag's length. The proportion of the coat of arms is 5:6.

A 2:3 proportion can be used internationally and/or when specifically requested. In this case, the coat of arms' width is 1/3 of the flag's length, and the center of the cross on the top of the crown will be at 1/6 of the flag's height below the upper edge.

The colours of the flag are officially prescribed as follows:

Colour/Colour system	Pantone Coated	Pantone Uncoated	CMYK	Pantone TPX
Light blue on the flag	2915 C	2915 U	55/10/5/0	15–4323 TPX
White	Pure white	Pure white	0/0/0/0	White textile
Sun yellow	7406 C	7404 U	5/25/100/0	14–0852 TPX
Golden yellow	124 C	7405 U	5/35/100/10	15–1050 TPX
Brown on branches	7559 C	7558 U	15/35/70/30	18–0939 TPX
Green in the light	576 C	577 U	47/10/70/0	17–0336 TPX
Green on leaves	7742 C	363 U	65/25/80/13	18–0135 TPX
Green in the shadow	Cool gray 4 C + 7742 C or 350 C	Cool gray 3 U + 363 U or 350 U	65/25/80/50	14–4103 TPX + 18–0135 TPX or 19–6311 TPX
Sky blue on the shield	291 C	291 U	47/8/7/0	14–4318 TPX
Blue in shadow	Cool gray 4 C + 291 C or 7698 C	Cool gray 3 U +291 U or 7698 U	70/30/20/20	14–4103 TPX + 14–4318 TPX or 18–4217 TPX
Gray in shadow	Cool gray 4 C	Cool gray 3 U	0/0/0/30	14–4103 TPX
Black	Black C	Black U	0/0/0/100	Black TPX

== Political flags ==
Sammarinese Communist Party

== Municipalities ("Castelli") ==
Each castello of San Marino has its own flag, as indicated by the March 28th, 1997 decree n°40. All of these flags consist of their respective coats of arms placed over the white and blue horizontal bicolour of San Marino. Article 2 demands each name to be indicated vertically at the hoist in Peignot font, but it is not enforced, and unnamed flags are usually seen hoisted at public offices.

Acquaviva

Borgo Maggiore

Chiesanuova

Domagnano

Faetano

Fiorentino

Montegiardino

San Marino

Serravalle

== See also ==
- Coat of arms of San Marino
- The Three Towers of San Marino
