= Coat of arms of San Marino =

Versions
- A pre-standardisation Coat of Arms
- Armiger: Republic of San Marino
- Adopted: 14th century (standardised on 22 July 2011)
- Crest: A Crown of the Republic
- Shield: Azure on three mountain tops vert three towers argent masoned and windowed sable each weather vaned with an ostrich plume argent
- Supporters: Wreath of laurel and oak
- Motto: Libertas "Freedom"

The coat of arms of San Marino probably originated in the fourteenth century. The official establishment took place on 6 April 1862 by a Decree of the Supreme Council; the same act introduced the crown on top of the shield.

There is little evidence regarding the official design until the mid-20th century. "The Flag Bulletin" vol. III, no. 2 from the winter of 1963–64 is reproducing on page 31 an "official plate showing the flag and arms of San Marino, [which] was a gift of the Sammarinese government, through its Consul in New York City." This plate was previously published in an official guide of the republic, from March 1963. In 2011, a new Law on the flag and coat of arms of San Marino presented a slightly simplified design, the main changes being that the branches have no more ramifications, the towers are square instead of round, and the gates are oriented now towards sinister.

The coat of arms of San Marino adorns among other things the flag of the country and the logo of the San Marino Football Federation.

== History ==
The oldest surviving examples of the coat of arms of San Marino come from seals dated to 14th and 15th centuries and conserved in the State Archive. These seals already show the three towers topped with feathers on top of a mountain. A seal from 1560 is the first instance showing the coat of arms, topped by a crown.

== Description ==
The official description of the coat of arms is:

"The official coat of arms of the Republic is surmounted by a closed crown, the symbol of sovereignty The shield is azure, three mountains vert, towers argent, windowed, embattled and masoned sable, surmounted by ostrich plumes argent. The shield is surrounded by two branches vert, overlapped in saltire below the shield, one of laurel, the other of oak, fructed or. On a ribbon argent the motto LIBERTAS in capital letters sable."

The components of the coat of arms are in detail:

- In the blue shield there are three green mountains with three silver towers, each decorated with a weather vane consisting of a silver ostrich feather. The towers symbolize the three citadels of San Marino (La Guaita, La Cesta and La Montale), while the hills represent the three summits of Monte Titano.
- The motto "LIBERTAS" (Lat. freedom). It possibly refers to the taking in of victims of political persecution in the earlier years of San Marino, and to the amazing maintenance of independence in the midst of many larger states. The motto could also have developed from the alleged last words of the founder Marinus: "Relinquo vos liberos ab utroque homine" (Lat. "I leave you free from both men").
- An oak and laurel branch, which surrounds the coat of arms are symbols for the stability of the republic and the defense of the liberty.
- A crown, which serves as symbol of sovereignty.

== See also ==
- Saint Marinus
- Flag of San Marino
- The Three Towers of San Marino
