= Church of Santa Coloma d'Andorra =

Church in Andorra

Coordinates: 42°29′39″N 1°29′51″E

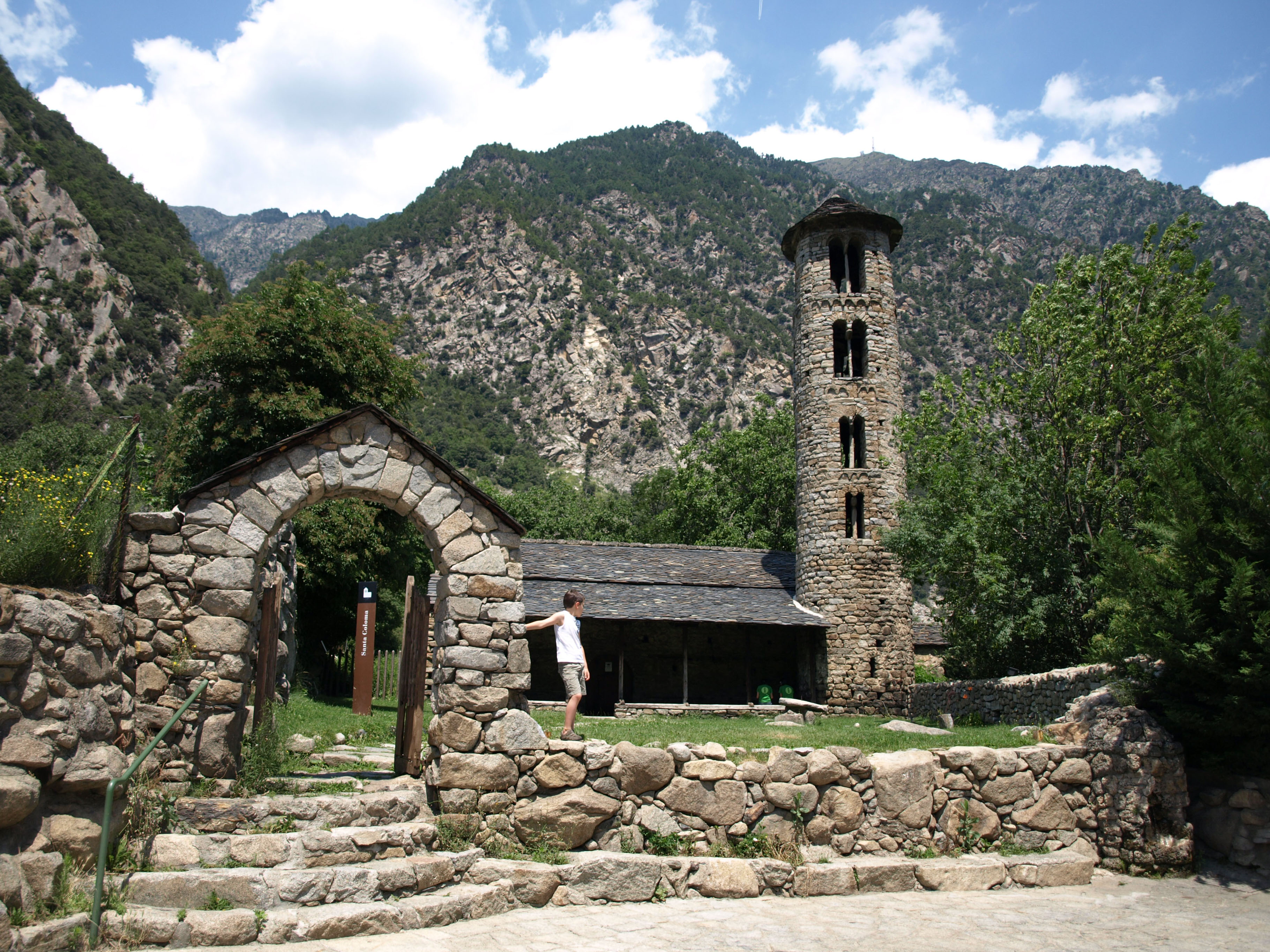
Església de Santa Coloma d'Andorra

The Church of Santa Coloma d'Andorra (Catalan: Eglésia de Santa Coloma) is a church in Santa Coloma, Andorra la Vella Parish, Andorra, and is Andorra's oldest church. It is a heritage property registered in the Cultural Heritage of Andorra. It is dedicated to Columba of Sens, patron saint of Andorra. The nave of the church was built in the 8th or 9th century, and the tower in the 12th century. In the church are visible remnants of murals made in the 12th century by the Master of Sant Coloma. Most of the murals were removed in 1933 and were in Berlin until 2007. These murals are now present in the Andorran Government Exhibition Hall.

== History ==
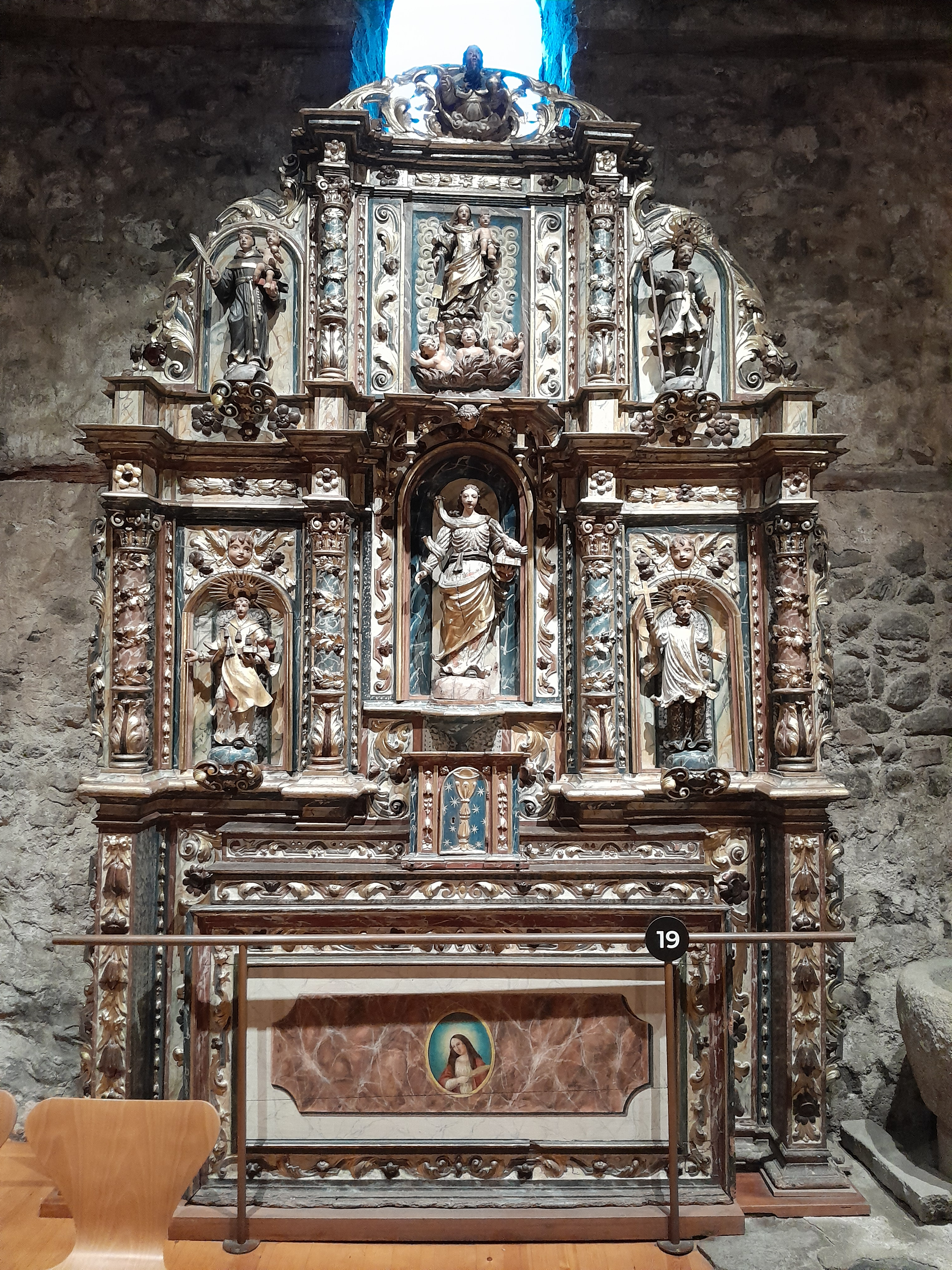
Interior

The Church of Santa Coloma d'Andorra in Santa Coloma, Andorra la Vella Parish is Andorra's oldest church. It is a heritage property registered in the Cultural Heritage of Andorra. It is dedicated to Columba of Sens, patron saint of Andorra.

The church is rectangular, with a door opening to the south, a bell tower. The nave of the church was built in the 8th or 9th century, and the tower in the 12th century. It is constructed of schist and granite bound with lime mortar. There are sculpted heads with prominent chins or beards, in travertine ashlar, on the facade window frames of the bell tower. The building was renovated some time in the 12th century, followed by maintenance in the 13th to 17th centuries. A second major renovation occurred from 1740–1749. The altarpiece dates from this second renovation. More renovation work was carried out by architect Cèsar Martinell in the 1930s, and another renovation in the 1970s.

In the church are visible remnants of murals made in the 12th century by the Master of Sant Coloma. Most of the murals were removed in 1933 and were in Berlin until 2007. These murals are now present in the Andorran Government Exhibition Hall.

The church features on some Andorran euro coins.
