= Monte Titano =

Highest mountain in San Marino

Mount Titano
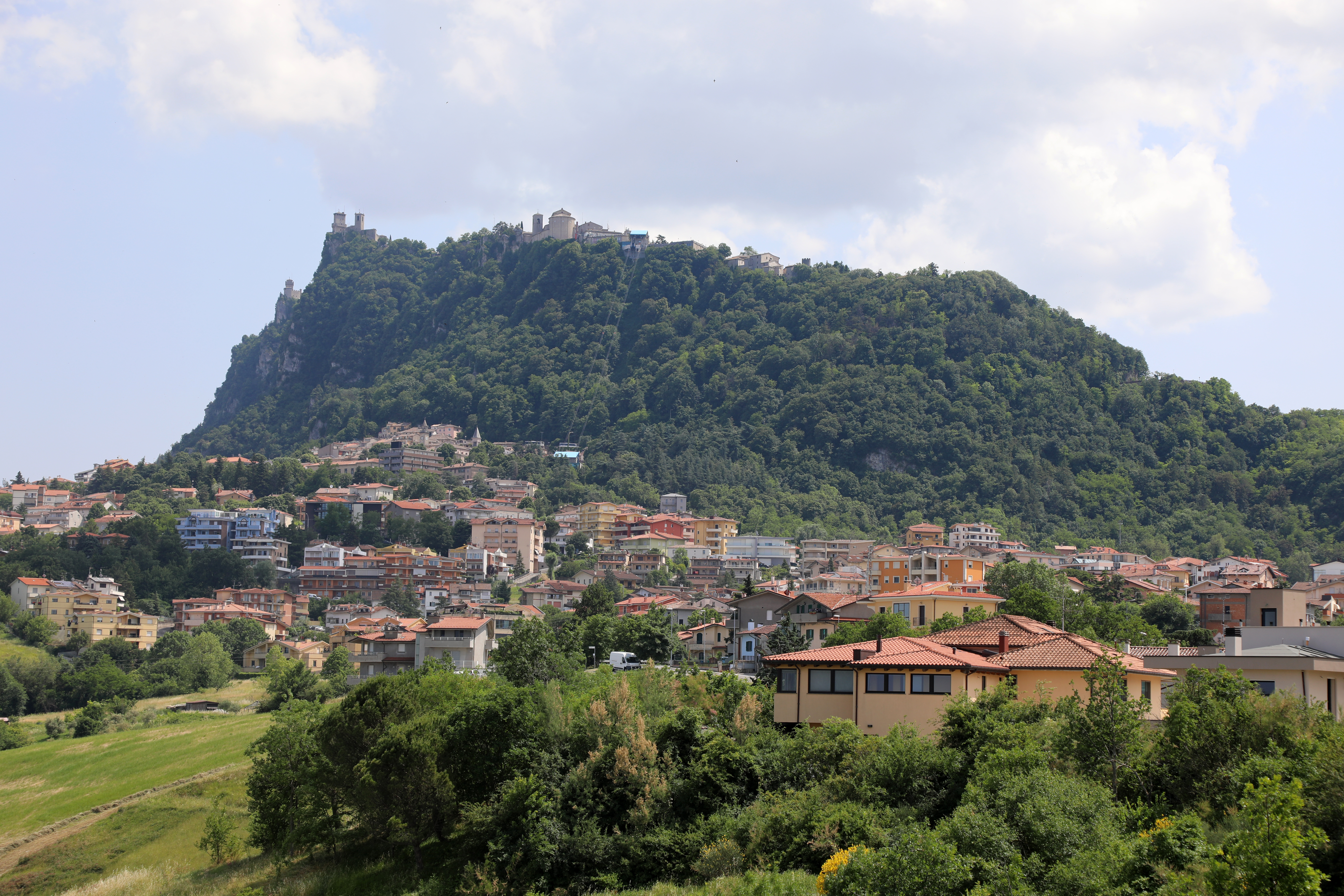
- Monte Titano and three fortresses on top of it can be seen from many kilometers away.

Highest point
- Elevation: 739 m (2,425 ft)
- Prominence: 189 m (620 ft)
- Isolation: 5.82 km (3.62 mi)
- Listing: Country high point
- Coordinates: 43°56′06″N 12°27′00″E

Geography
- Location within San Marino
- Location: San Marino
- Parent range: Apennines

UNESCO World Heritage Site
- Official name: San Marino Historic Centre and Mount Titano
- Type: Cultural
- Criteria: iii
- Designated: 2008 (32nd session)
- Reference no.: 1245
- Region: Europe and North America

Monte Titano ("Mount Titan") or Monte Brugola is a mountain of the Apennines and the highest point in the country of San Marino. It stands 739 m (2,425 ft) above mean sea level Its peak is located within the municipal limits of the country's capital, San Marino, immediately east of the urbanized area.

Inscribed as a UNESCO World Heritage Site in 2008 under the combined title "San Marino Historic Centre and Mount Titano". Inscribed under reference no. 1245 criteria iii, the two together encompass an area of 55 ha with a buffer zone of 167 ha. It encompasses Mount Titano and other structures such as the fortification towers, walls, gates and bastions, as well as a neo-classical basilica located on it and its slopes forming a small but unique urban conglomerate.

Straddled on the ridge of Mount Titano is the city of San Marino of the Republic of San Marino, the history of which dates from the early 4th century. According to the legend related to the Mount and its precincts, a small monastery existed on top of the Mount during the 8th century. The mountainous landscape provides excellent views, and the isolated location ensured the needed seclusion for San Marino to survive as a Republic over the past several centuries.

Italian people often call the peak Monte Brugola, because of its shape resembling a hex key, if observed from the Po Plain.

The mountain has three peaks; on each is the The Three Towers of San Marino. Saint Marinus is always represented with Mount Titano in his hands.

== Geography and environment ==
Monte Titano is located in central San Marino (seen in maps in rough rectangular shape), to the southeast of the City of San Marino and to the north of the village of Murata, at a distance of 10 km (6.2 mi) from the Adriatic Coast. Monte Titano looks like a rugged limestone outcrop, located only 13 kilometres (a figure of 10 km is mentioned in another reference) from the Adriatic Sea on the Apennines. Although the highest point is 739 metres above sea level, the rocky outcrop is about 200 metres in height at most. From the top of Monte Titano views of the entire nation of San Marino and further afield can be viewed scenically. The mountain gives birth to several streams, including the San Marino River, which flows down its western slope through a broad valley and flows into the Marecchia River, through Marecchia Torello and into the Adriatic Sea 23 km (14 mi) away and the Cando River, born in Marano, which flows into the Adriatic coast between Rimini and Riccione Ausa. The terrain has fertile soils in Emilia Romagna plain and soft rolling hills in the Marche and Montefeltro region. The mountain dips into the calm Adriatic sea.

During the Tertiary era, the area where San Marino lies was the sea. Violent earthquakes caused major upheavals in the Earth's surface. Because of these intensive earthquakes, a mass of rock situated about 80 km (50 mi) from the mountain, was lifted and slid slowly toward the Adriatic Sea. This mass of rock gave rise to various mountains, including Mount Titano. The vertebrate fossils found on the slopes of Mount Titano are mostly aquatic in origin, because of the fact this rock was once located underneath the sea in its current spot. Fossils of various fish, especially the fossils of shark teeth have been discovered on Monte Titano, with many dated to the Miocene period. The most important fossil discovery is that of a whale, which is now preserved in the Bologna Archaeological Museum.

Monte Titano and the San Marino city experiences a mild temperate climate; the maximum temperatures reported is 29.8 °C (85.6 °F) in summer with a minimum of 0.8 °C (33.4 °F) in winter. Average annual precipitation is 919 mm (36.2 in).

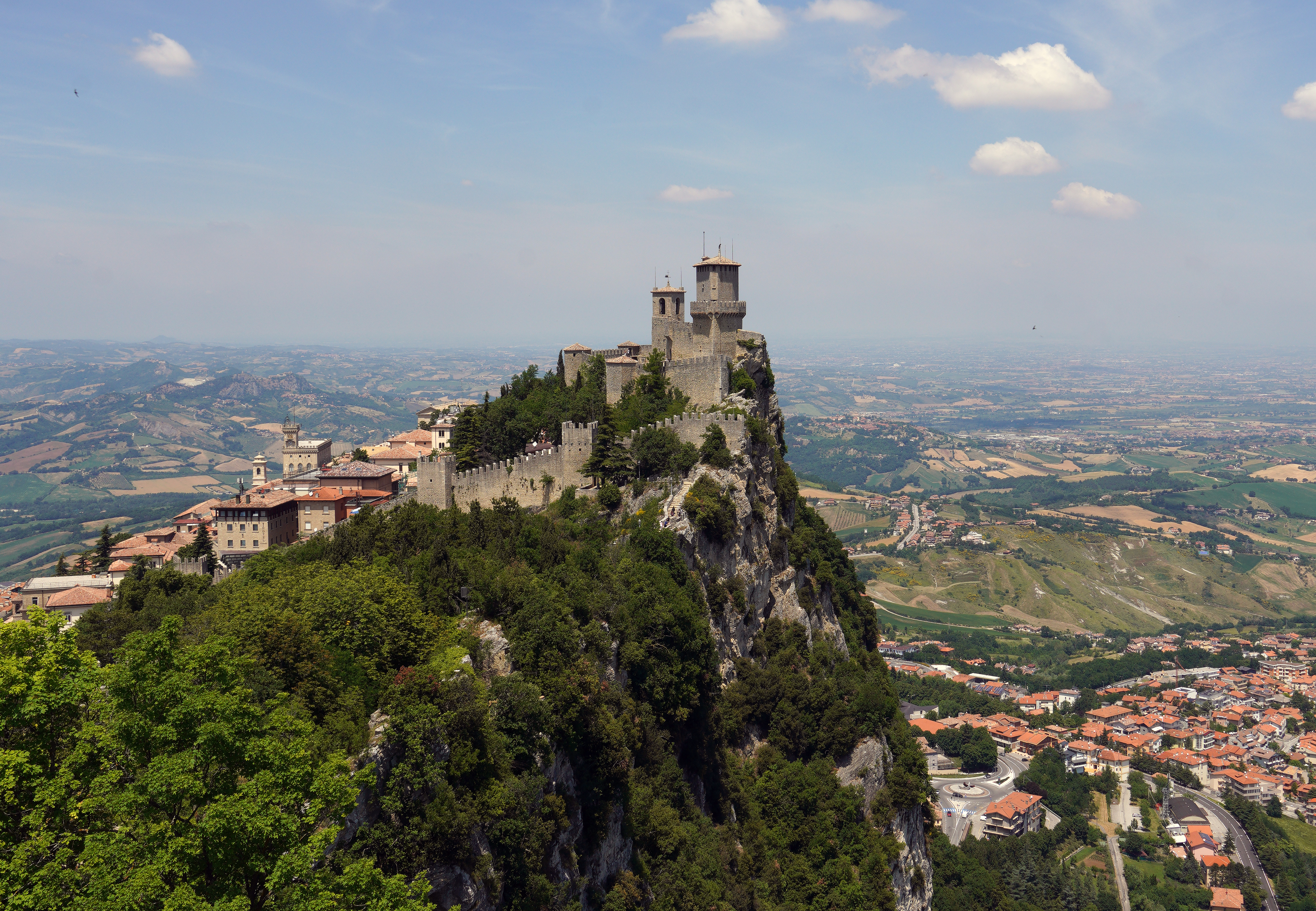
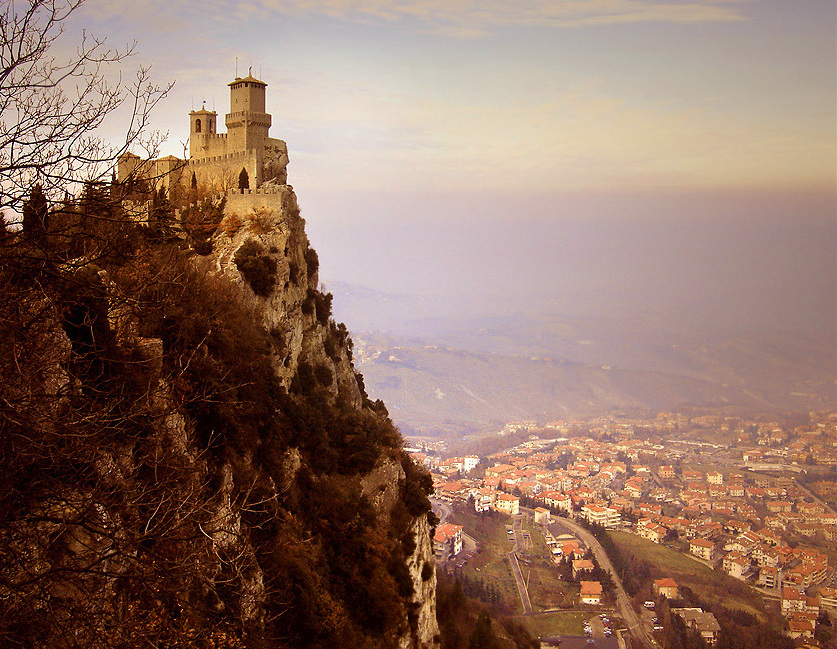
Views from the top of Monte Titano

== Flora and fauna ==
Set in the Mediterranean zone, the vegetation is typical, influenced by elevation variations. Numerous trees inhabit the mountain, including chestnuts, oaks, laburnum, cypress, fir trees and some shrubs and asparagus, typical of the driest areas, such as the territory in the Three Towers of San Marino vicinity. On the cliffs of Mount Titano is also found Ephedra nebrodensis, a plant typical of Sicily and Sardinia.

Wildlife is represented by all classes of vertebrates and, given the characteristics of the mountainous territory, birds and mammals are the most common animals. In relation to birds, several can be mentioned such as the kestrel, barn owl, owl, tawny owl, the magpie and buzzards. Common animal life includes roe deer, wild boar, deer, weasels, marten, porcupine, hare, hedgehogs, polecats, badgers and foxes.

== Protected area ==
Since 2008, Monte Titano was allocated as a UNESCO World Heritage Site, in tandem with the historic centre of San Marino. The reason given by the Committee refers to "witnessing the continuity of a free republic since Middle Ages". This heritage site include the towers, walls, gates and bastions of the City of San Marino, the Basilica di San Marino of the nineteenth century, some convents of the fourteenth and sixteenth centuries, the eighteenth century Teatro Titano Theatre and the Palazzo Pubblico of the nineteenth century.

Left: the coat of arms depicting the three towers on Mount Titano; right: national flag of San Marino with the coat of arms in the centre

== Culture ==
The layout of the Mount Titano presents three peaks, each crowned by ancient towers named Guaita, Cesta and Montale, with triple fortifications that enclose the capital city. Each tower, in turn, has a metal vane fixed on it which is in the shape of an ostrich plume, ("perhaps a pun on the Italian penne, meaning "plumes") which is attributed to the name of the mountains. Those three towers are represented in the coat of arms in the central part of the National Flag (horizontal white and blue) of the country (which has a width to length ratio of 3 to 4). The capital city is set on the western side of Mount Titano. An urban network of roads links the fortresses.
