= Statua della Libertà =

Statue in San Marino, Republic of San Marino

Coordinates: 43.9366°N 12.4469°E

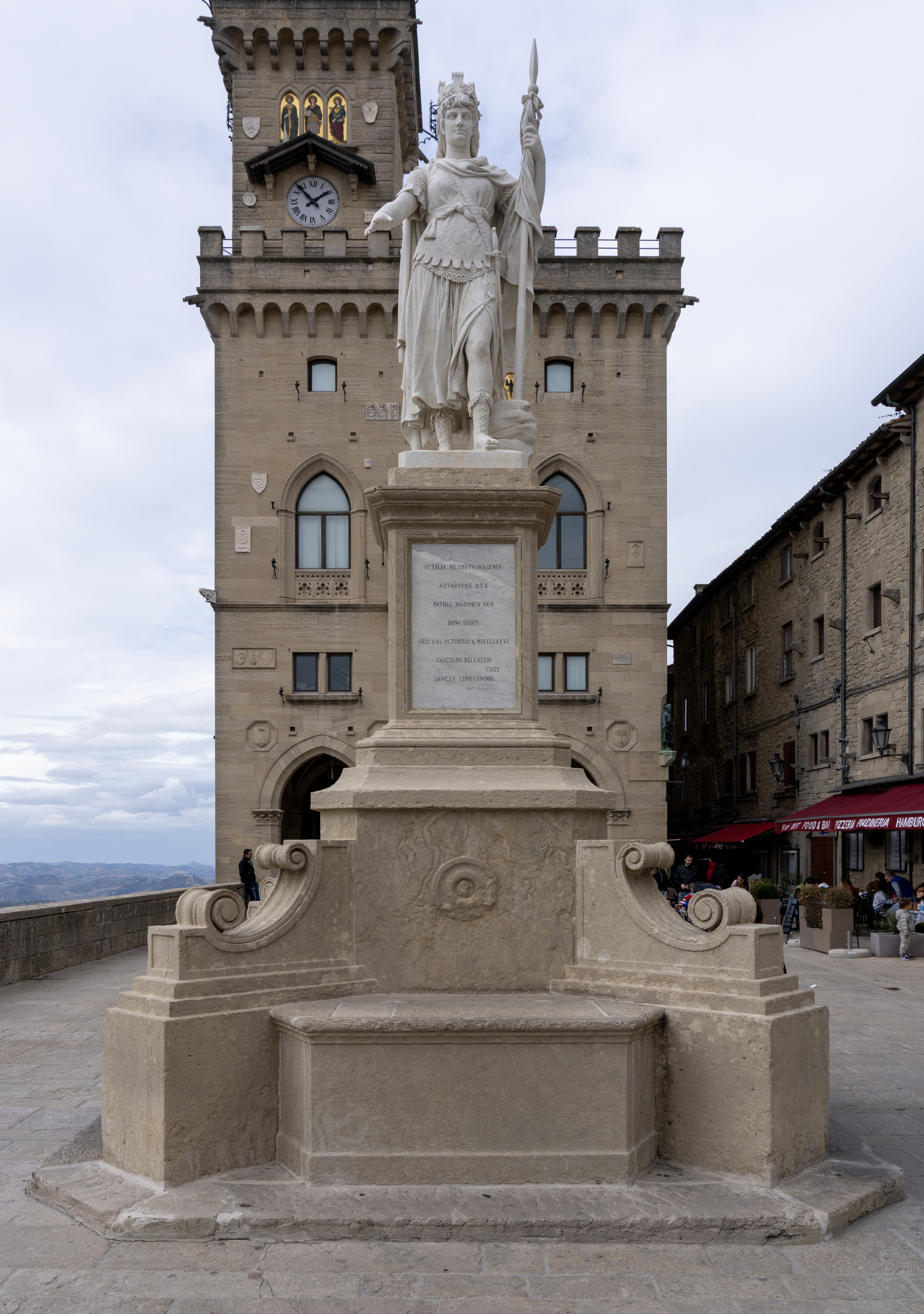
Statua della Libertà

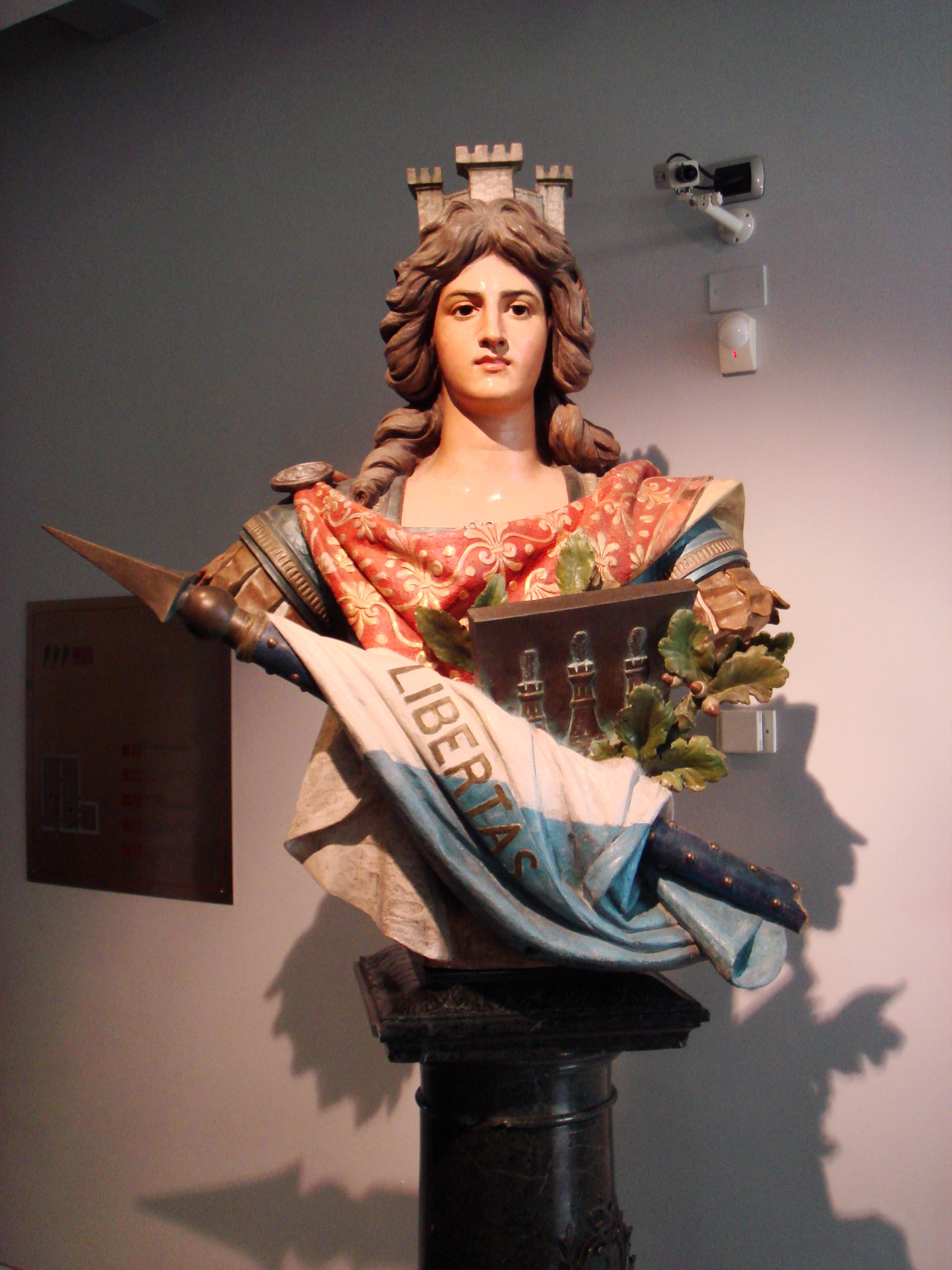
La Repubblica, by the Italian sculptor Vittorio Pochini. Another interpretation of the Sammarinese personification, it was made in 1899 and now sits in the State Museum of San Marino.

Statua della Libertà (Italian pronunciation: [ˈstaːtwa della liberˈta; ˈstaːtu.a]) is a statue in Piazza della Libertà, City of San Marino, the capital city of the Republic of San Marino.

The Statua della Libertà, made in the neoclassical style of white Carrara marble and is located between Parva Domus and the Palazzo Pubblico. It is a work of the sculptor Stefano Galletti and was donated by Countess Otilia Heyroth Wagener from Berlin to the Republic in 1876, because she had become Countess of Acquaviva.

The statue symbolizes freedom. Freedom is represented as a warrior advancing fiercely with one hand extended forward and one with a flag. On the head of the statue is a crown with three towers representing the fortified city of San Marino, the symbolic meaning is the reinstatement of freedom.

The Statua della Libertà is depicted on the Sammarinese 2 cent euro coins.
