= San Francesco, San Marino =

Church in San Marino

Coordinates: 43°56′07″N 12°26′50″E

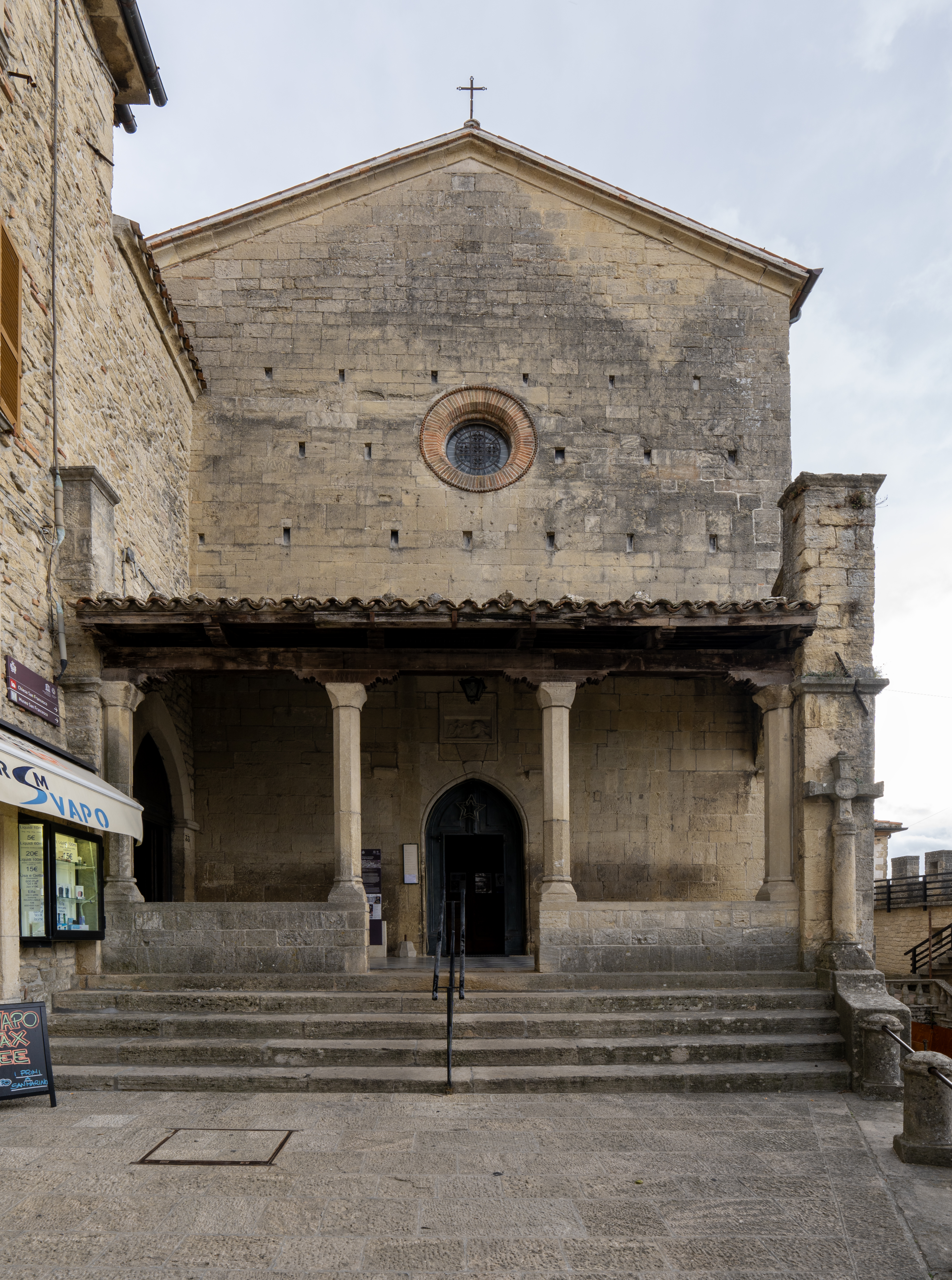

Chiesa di San Francesco is a church in San Marino. It belongs to the Roman Catholic Diocese of San Marino-Montefeltro. It was built in 1361.

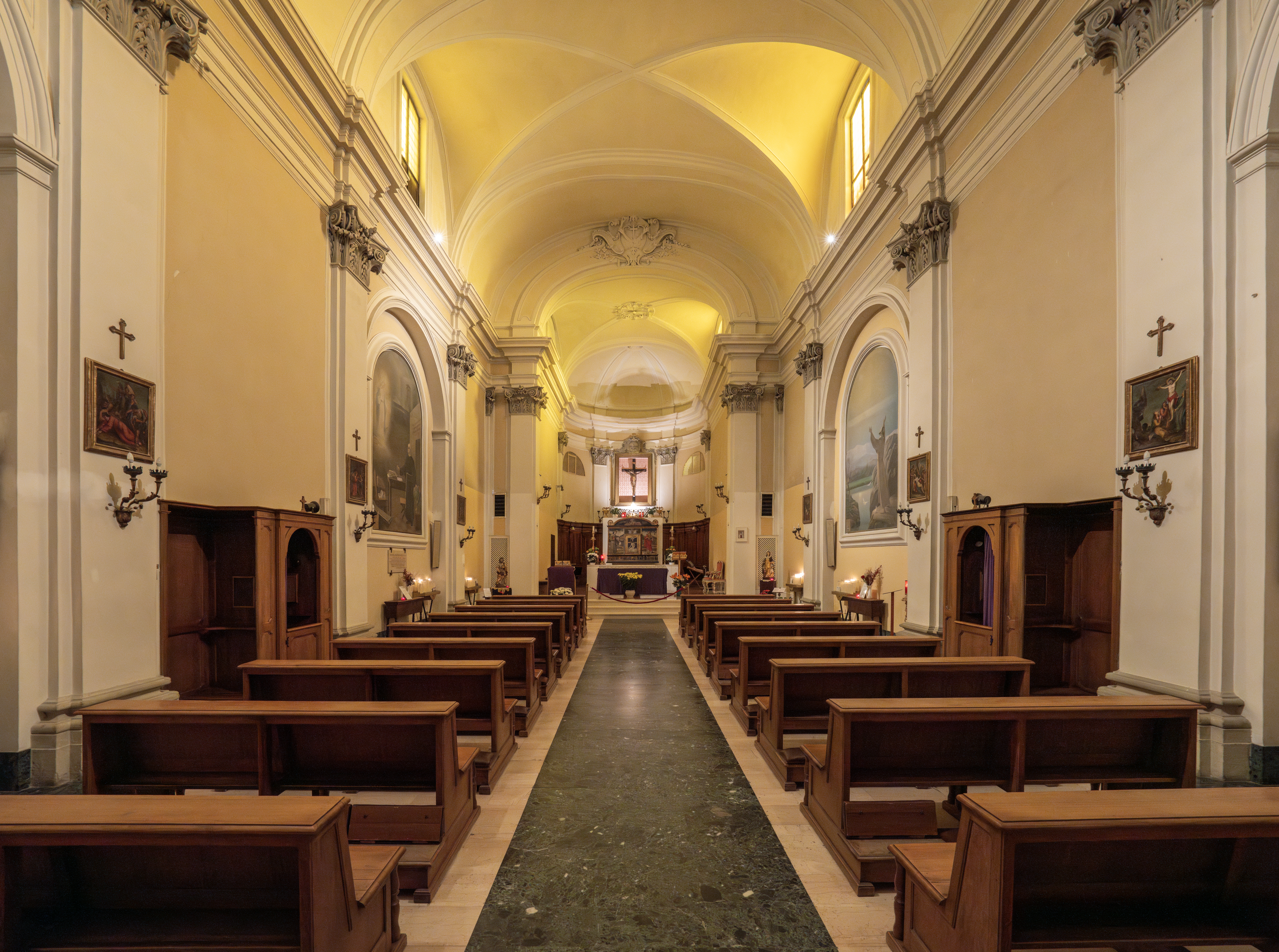
interior

The church of San Francesco is a church in the city of San Marino.

The adjoining convent and the church were initially based in Murata, near the city of San Marino, but then Pope Clement VII granted the displacement of the church and convent in the city of San Marino Murata because there was danger of raids by Malatesta.

Construction was begun in 1351 and completed around 1400, were used for the construction materials of the church and the convent suppressed. The rose window was covered in the seventeenth century it was brought to light last renovation performed by Gino Zani and brought back largely to the original lines. The construction workers attended both San Marino Comacine fact it includes the names of Mastro Baptist from Como and Mastro Manetto Samamrinese. In the cloister is the tomb of Bishop Marino Madroni, lived in the fifteenth century that belonged to the Franciscan friars. Museum in the adjacent St. Francis are preserved paintings by Guercino and Raphael.
