= Three Towers of San Marino =

Group of towers located in San Marino

Coordinates: 43°56′06″N 12°27′00″E

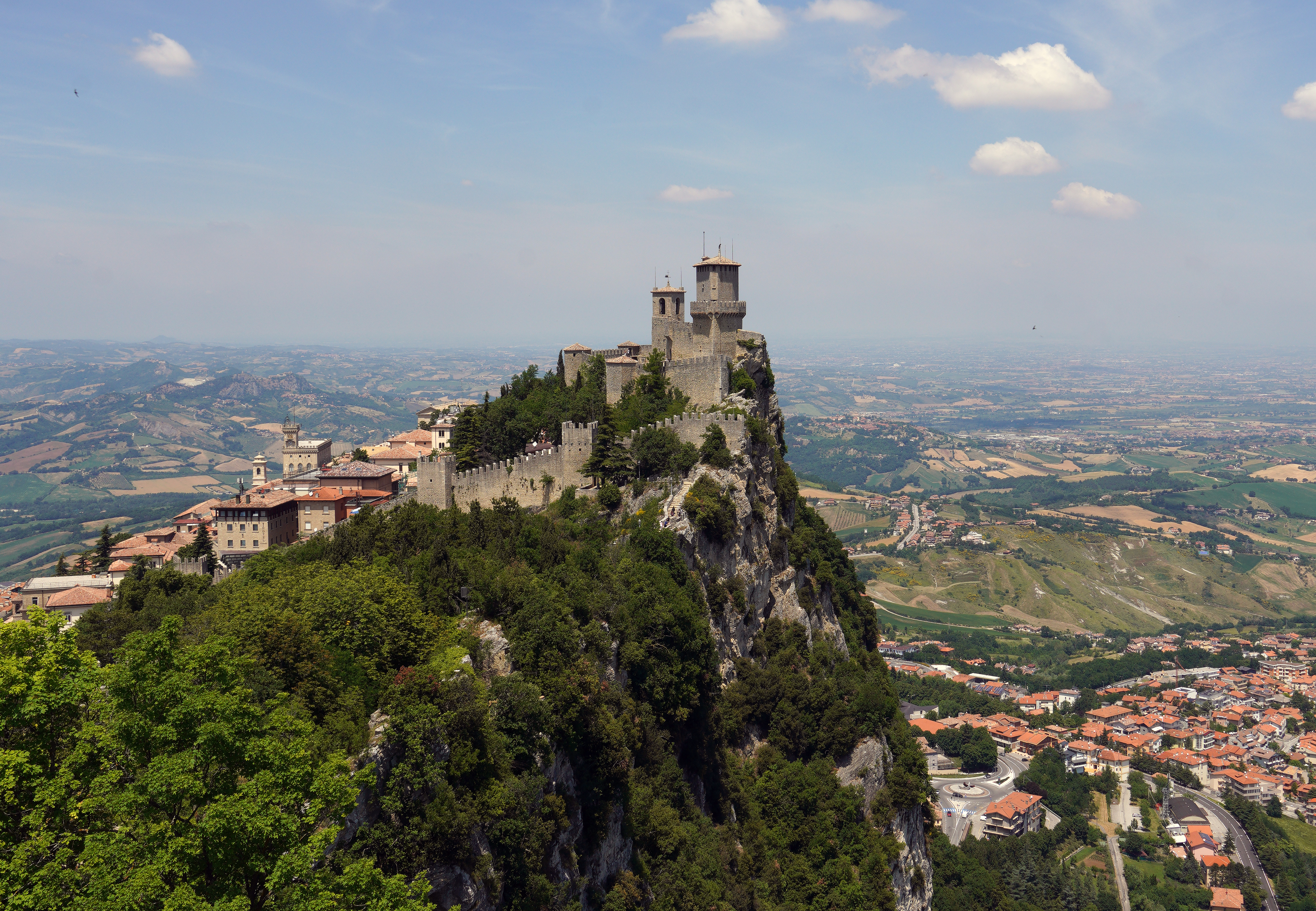
Guaita

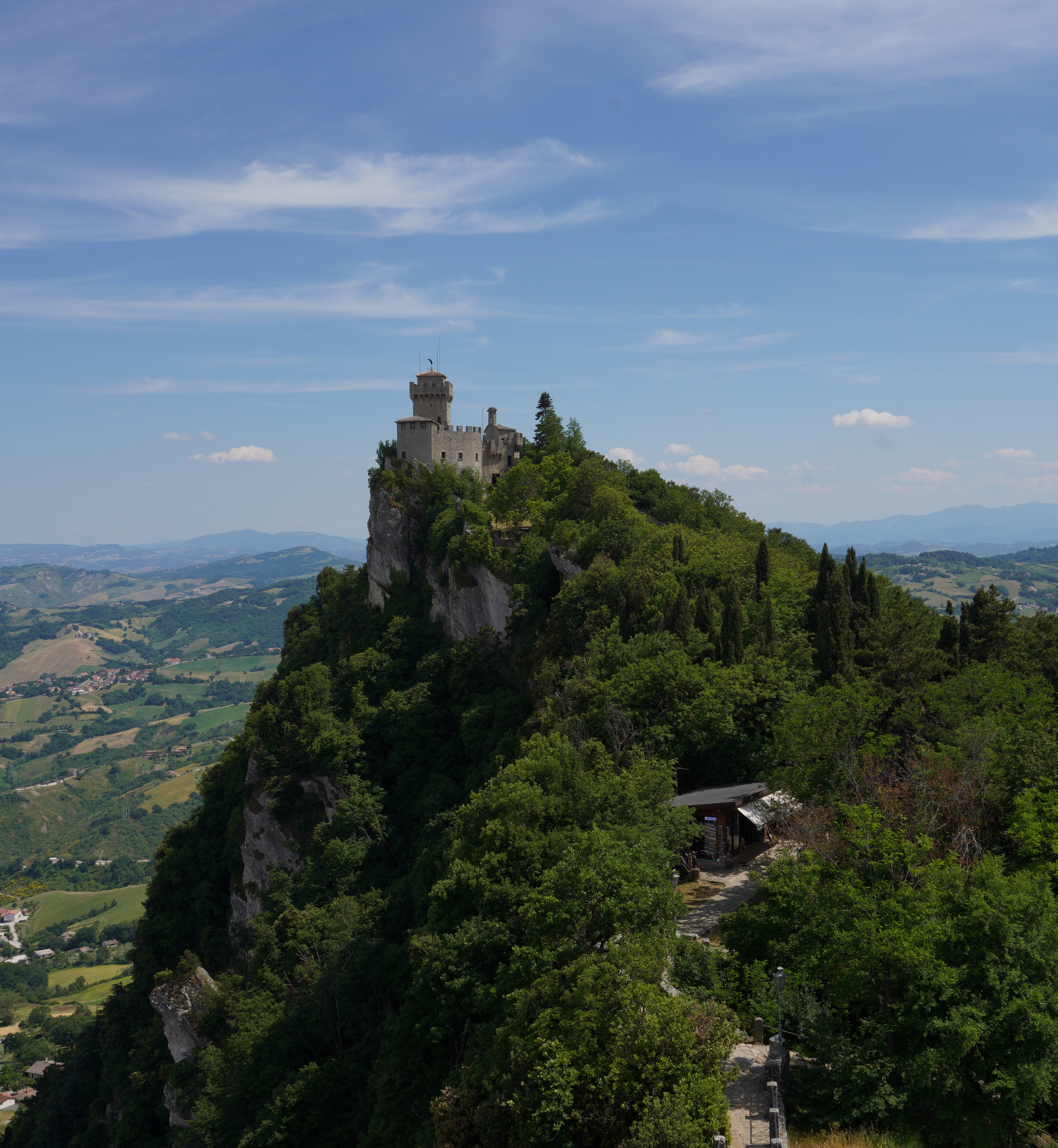
Cesta

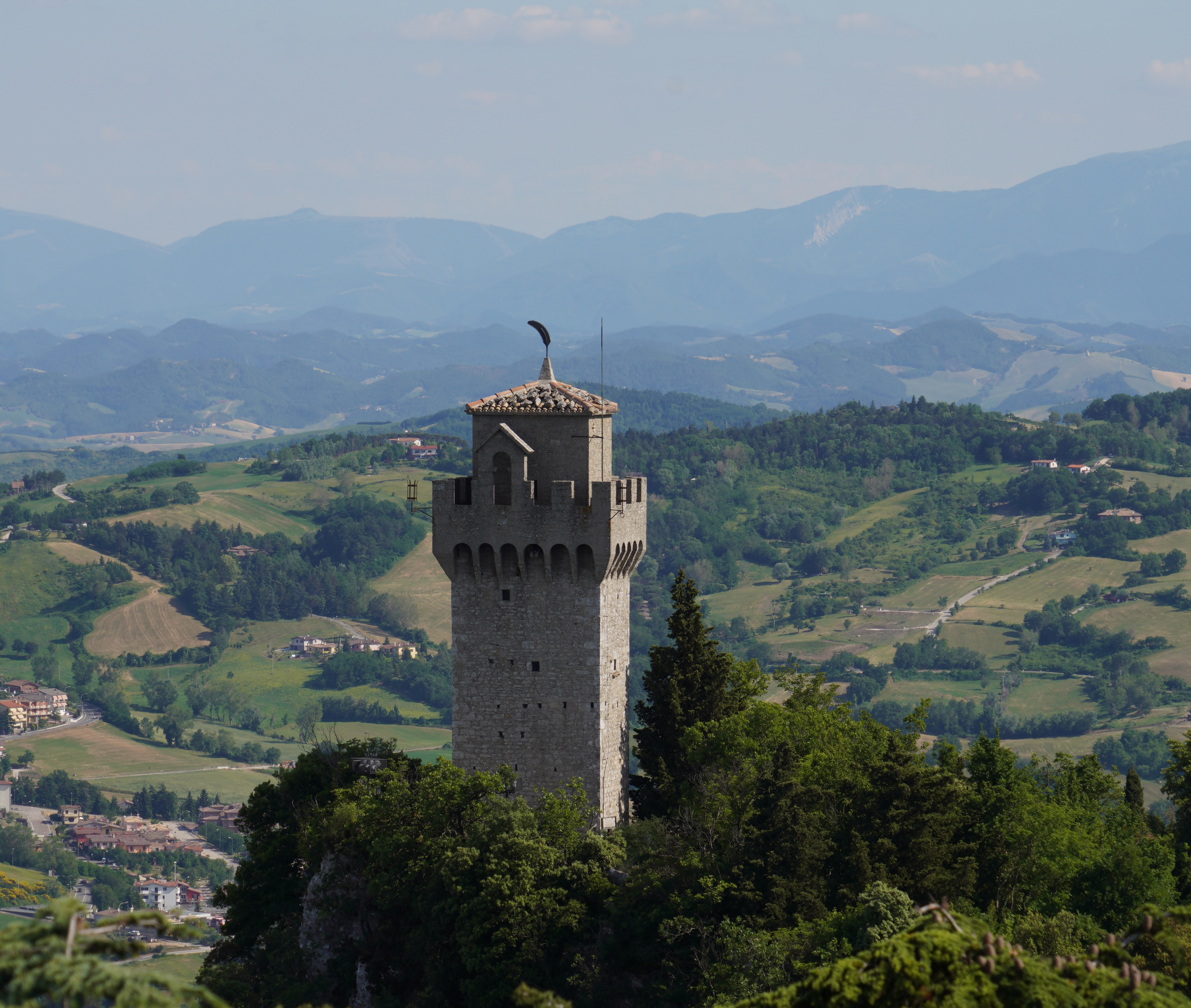
Montale

The Three Towers of San Marino are a group of towers located in San Marino. Located on the three peaks of Monte Titano in the capital, also called San Marino, they are depicted on both the national flag and coat of arms.

== First tower ==
The Guaita is the oldest of the three towers. It was constructed in the 11th century and served briefly as a prison. It was rebuilt numerous times and reached its current form in the 15th century during the war between San Marino and the House of Malatesta.

== Second tower ==
The Cesta is located on the highest of Monte Titano's summits. It contains a museum to honour Saint Marinus, which was created in 1956 and showcases over 1,550 weapons dating from the Medieval Era to the modern day. It was constructed in the 13th century on the remains of an older Roman fort.

== Third tower ==
The Montale is located on the smallest of Monte Titano's summits. Unlike the other towers, it is not open to the public. It was constructed in the 14th century. It is thought to have been constructed to give protection against the increasing power of the Malatesta family in that region. It was also used as a prison, and accordingly, the only entrance to the tower is a door about seven metres from ground level, which was common for prison architecture of the time.

== See also ==
- San Francesco Gate
- Porta Della Rupe
- Theatre Bastion
