= Guaita =

Mountain peak in San Marino

Coordinates: 43.9354°N 12.4496°E

Guaita Fortress

The Guaita, also known as the Rocca (Italian: "La Rocca"), is one of three towered peaks overlooking the city of San Marino, the capital of San Marino. The other two are Cesta and Montale.

== Fortress of Guaita ==
The fortress is the oldest of the three towers constructed on Monte Titano in the 11th century. In the Sammarinese dialect, its name means "to stand guard." It is often considered the most famous and imposing of the three peaks.

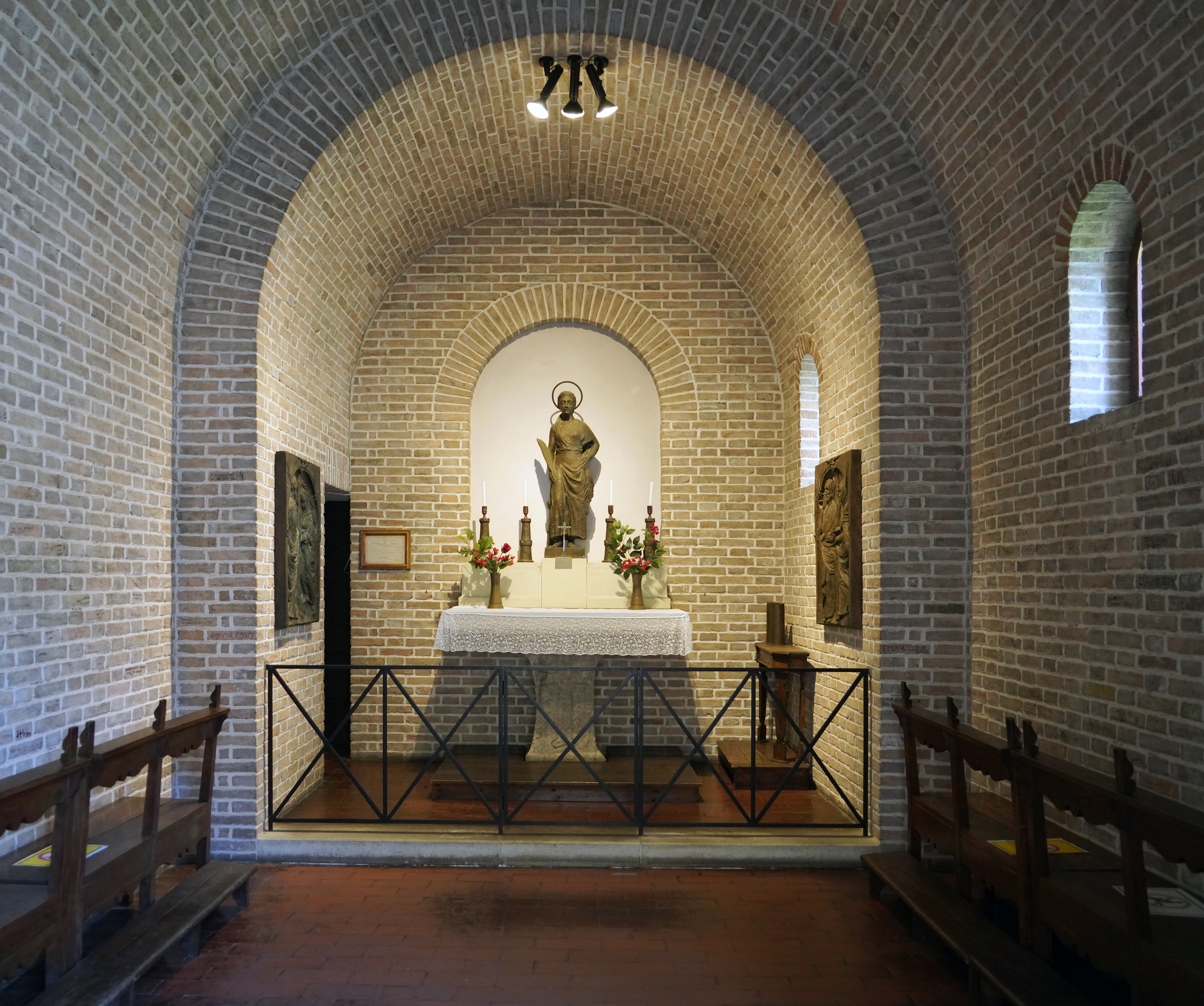
Interior church of Santa Barbara

The fortress was reinforced several times during the medieval period and was rebuilt in the late 1400s. In the 16th century, a sloping roof was added. The fortress is protected by double walls, the first one having battlements and having towers at the gate and on the corners. The fortress was often used to shelter people from sieges. Some rooms in the inner wall were used as prison cells for inmates whose sentences were less than six months, a practice that continued up until October 1970. It also contains a chapel of Saint Barbara, the patron saint of artillery and artillerymen.

Most of the inner wall is taken up by the bell tower and the main tower. The innermost part of the fortress is taken up by the mastio, the oldest part of the fortress. It has remained unchanged for centuries. The upper gate can be reached by a staircase and is defended by a bertesca from 1481. In the outer courtyard are two mortars and two 75mm cannons, gifts from Victor Emmanuel II and Victor Emmanuel III. The 75mm cannons are used by the Guard of the Rock to fire blanks on holidays.

Along with the other two towers, Cesta, and Montale, Guaita is depicted on both the national flag and the coat of arms. Monte Titano has been registered as a World Heritage Site since 2008.

== See also ==
- Cesta (2nd tower)
- Montale (3rd tower)
- Three Towers of San Marino
- Torta Tre Monti
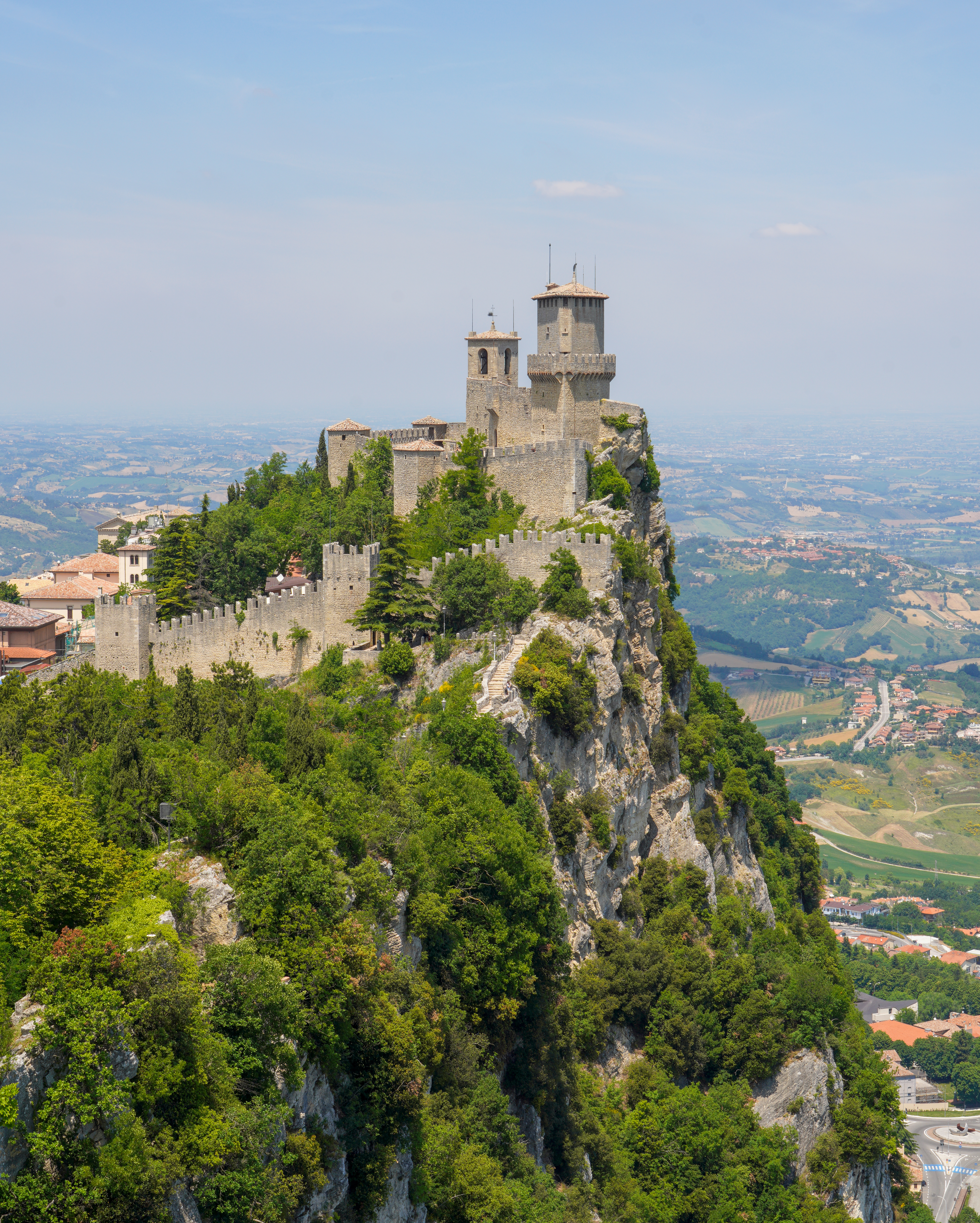
Large view

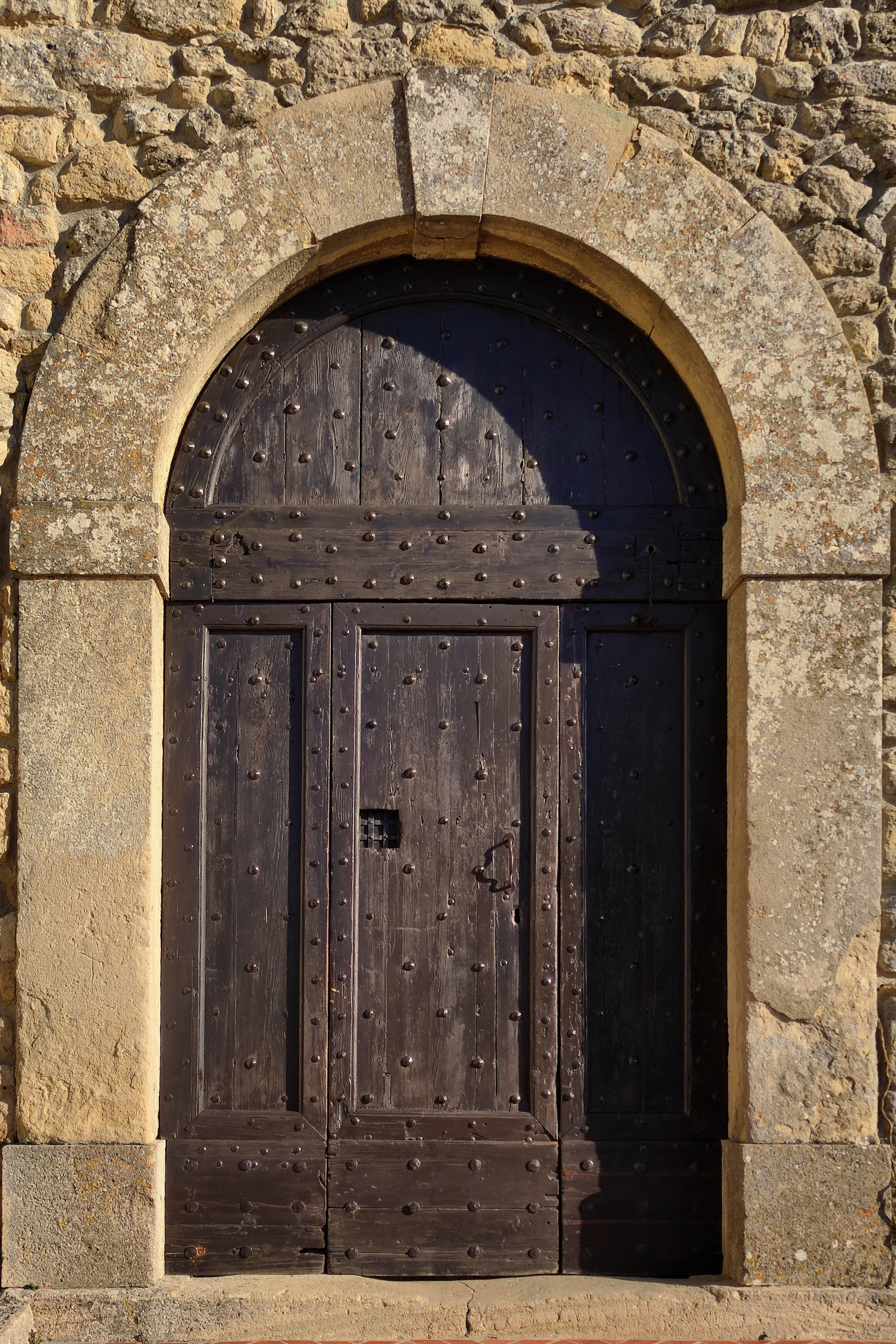
Main entrance

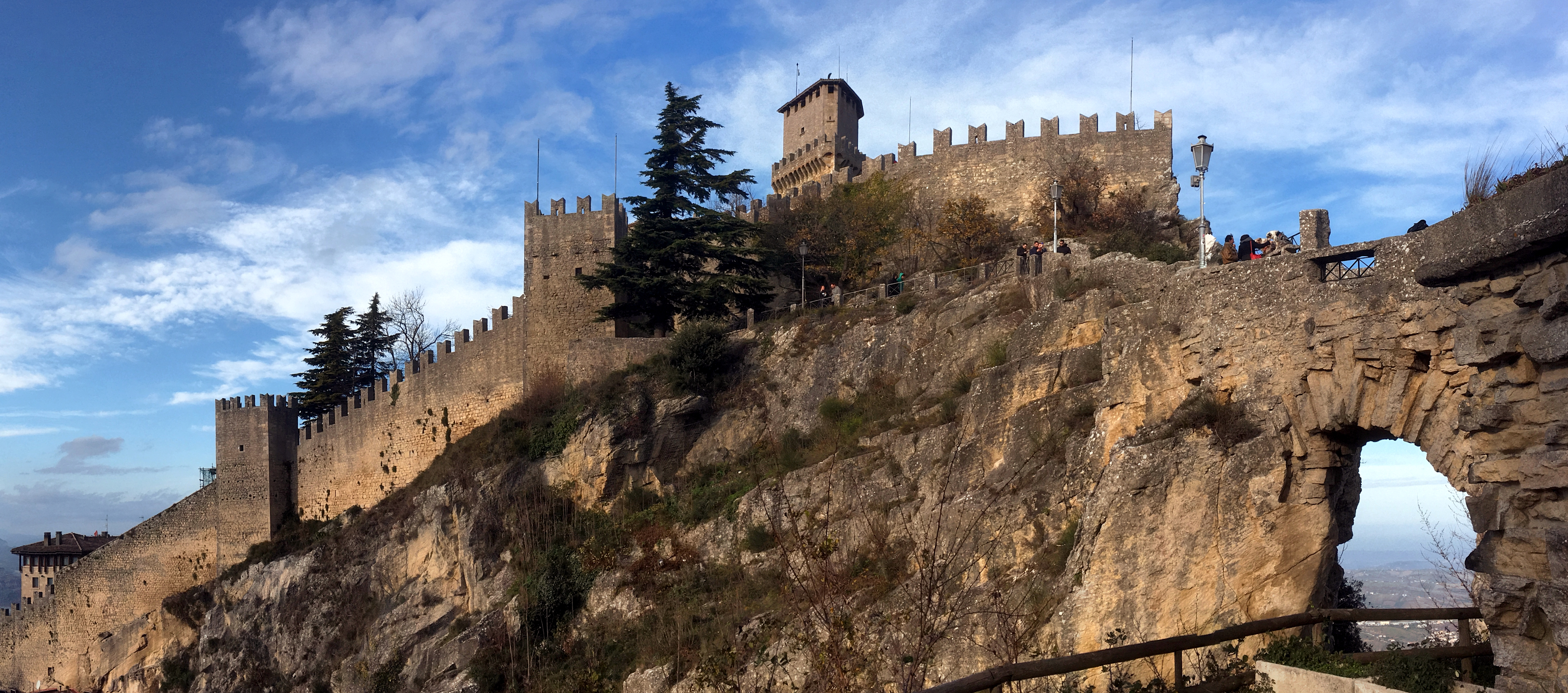
External view, in the foreground the defensive wall that almost hides the Guaita tower.

Large view of Guaita Fortress

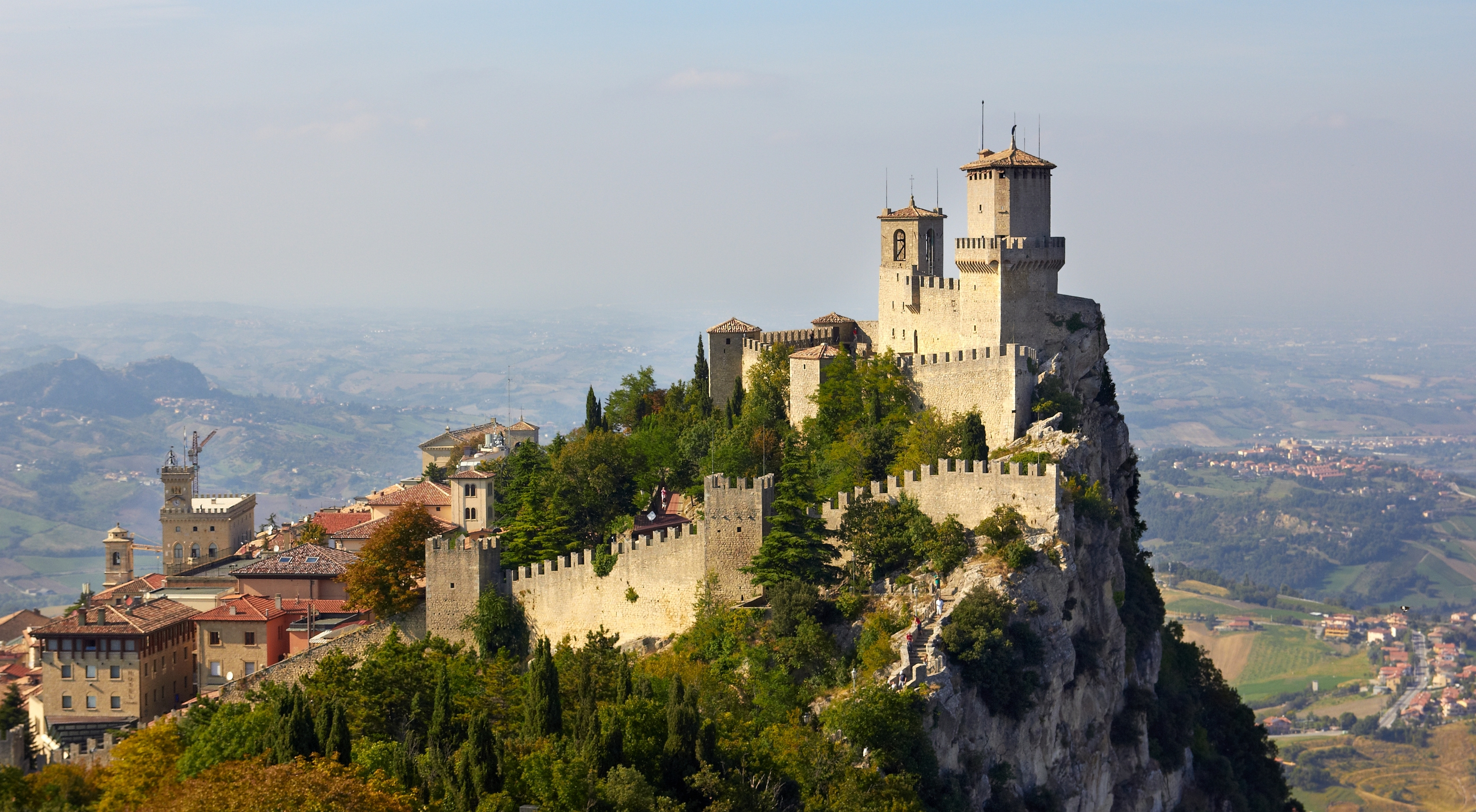
