= Saint Marinus =

Italian stonemason who founded San Marino in 301

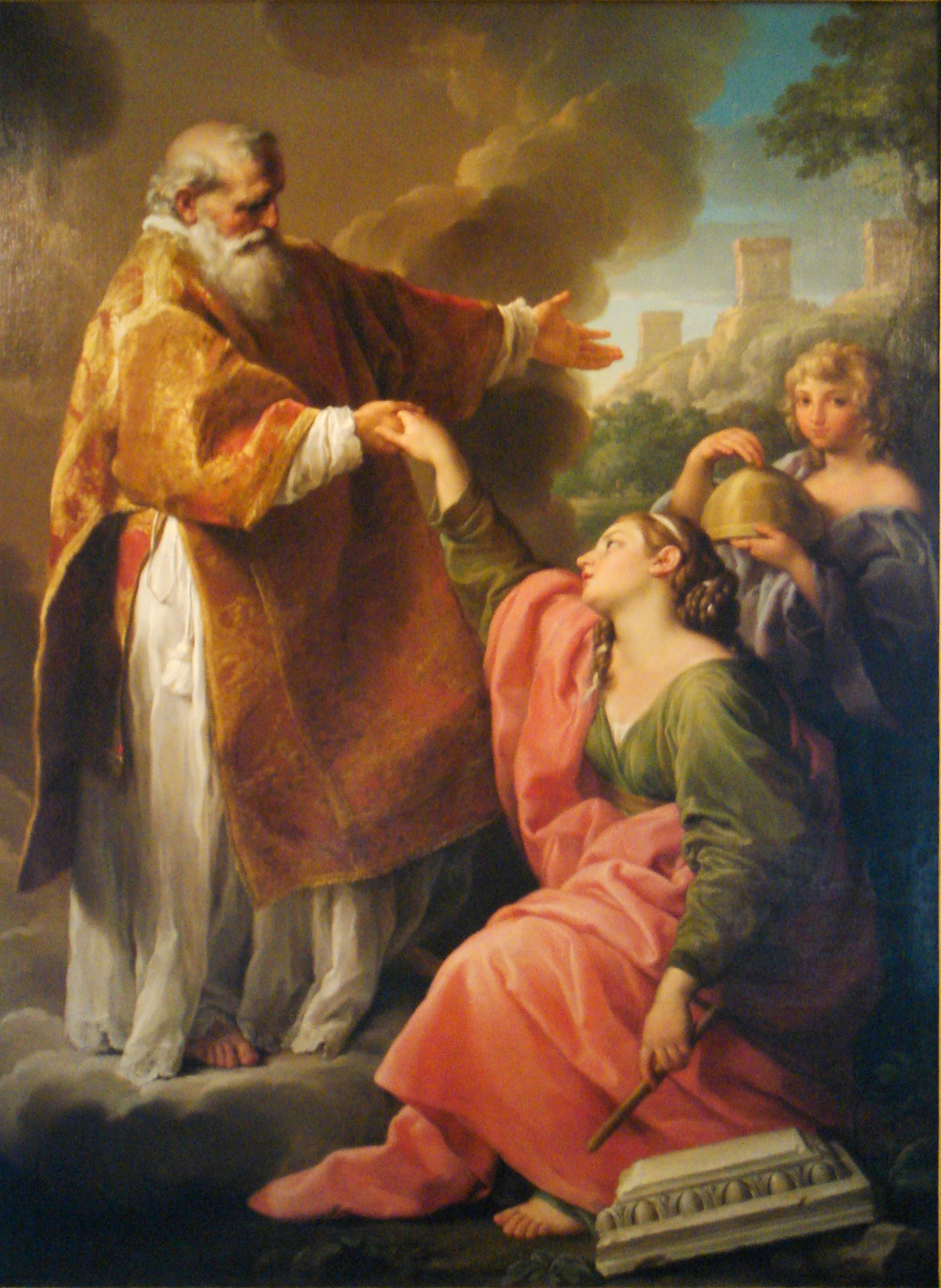
- Portrait by Pompeo Batoni, 1740

Hermit
- Born: c. 275; Arba, Dalmatia, Roman Empire
- Died: 366 (traditional); Monte Titano, Roman Italy
- Venerated in: Roman Catholic Church; Eastern Orthodox Church
- Major shrine: Basilica of Saint Marinus
- Feast: 3 September
- Attributes: Depicted with a stonemason's hammer and tools; two oxen near him.
- Patronage: bachelors; deacons; falsely accused people; San Marino

Marinus (/məˈriːnəs/; Italian: San Marino) is a Christian saint, who according to hagiographical accounts recorded centuries after his lifetime was the founder of a chapel and monastery in 301 from whose initial community the state of San Marino later grew.

== Life ==
Tradition holds that he was a stonemason by trade who came from the island of Arba (today Rab), on the other side of the Adriatic Sea (in what is now part of modern-day Croatia, then part of the Roman Empire), fleeing persecution for his Christian beliefs in the Diocletianic Persecution.

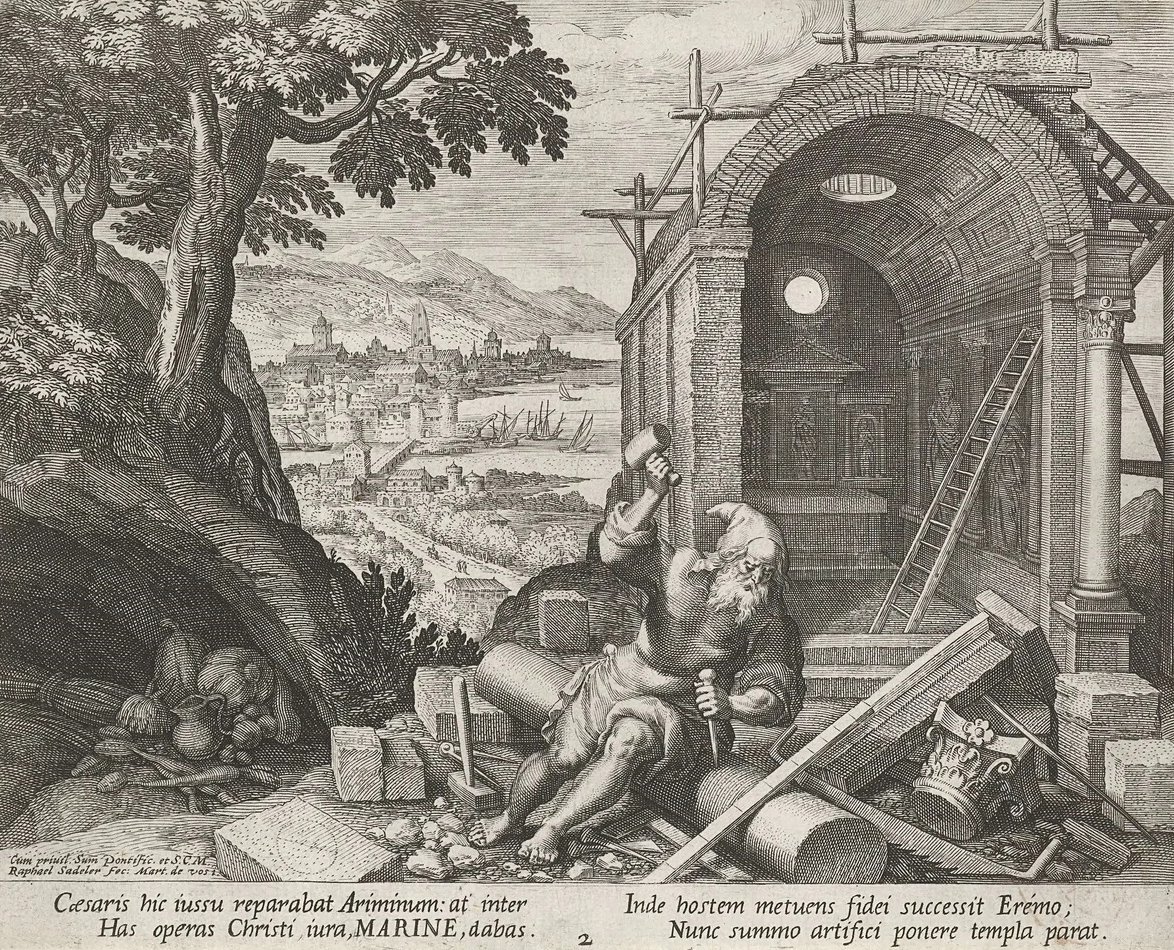
Illustration of Saint Marinus working at the chapel-monastery

Known only by the single name Marinus (lit. of the sea), he was ordained a deacon by Gaudentius of Rimini; later, he was recognised and accused by an insane woman of being her estranged husband, so he quickly fled to Monte Titano to build a chapel-monastery and live as a hermit.

Another version of the story says that hearing that the town of Rimini (Italy) was being rebuilt, he travelled there and was astonished to find among the workmen many Christians of formerly high position who had been sentenced to hard labour because of their refusal to sacrifice to the gods. He sought to comfort them and to alleviate their sufferings, so far as was in his power.

In his old age Marinus withdrew to a hermitage and decided to seclude himself on Mount Titano, living the life of a hermit in holy contemplation. As his reputation for his sanctity grew, others started to follow him there, until finally a lady from Rimini and the owner of Mount Titano decided to give him the mountain as a gift.

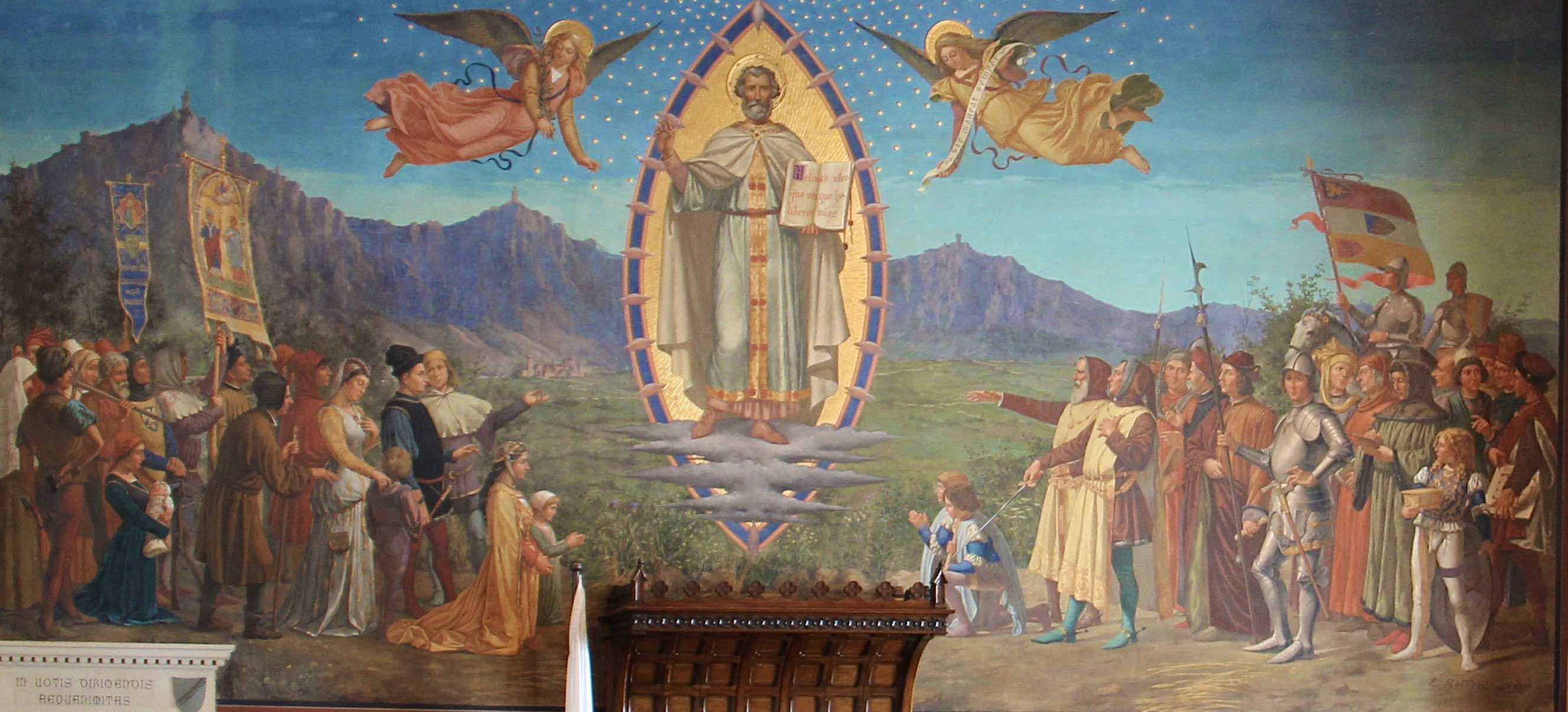
Painting of Saint Marinus descending from heaven surrounded by the people of San Marino, painting located within the Palazzo Pubblico

Marinus was canonised as a saint, and later, the State of San Marino grew up from the centre created by the monastery. His feast day/memorial day is 3 September, commemorating the day, in 301, when he founded what became known as San Marino, which is also the state's national holiday. He is venerated in the Roman Catholic and Eastern Orthodox faiths.

According to legend, he died in the winter of 366 and his last words were: "Relinquo vos liberos ab utroque homine" ("I leave you free from both men"). This somewhat mysterious phrase is most likely to refer to the two "men" from whose oppressive power Marinus had decided to separate himself, becoming a hermit on Mount Titano: respectively the Emperor and the Pope. This affirmation of freedom (first and foremost fiscal franchise) from both the Empire and the Papal States, however legendary, has always been the inspiration of the republic.

== Historicity ==
According to American historian William Miller, the account of Marinus and the origin of San Marino "are a mixture of fables and miracles, but perhaps contain some grains of fact". The earliest historical evidence for a monastic community in San Marino dates to the 5th or 6th century AD, when a monk named Eugippus recorded that another monk had lived in a monastery in the area.

== Sources ==
The earliest manuscripts mentioning Marinus and his life date to the 10th century. Another principal source of the events of Marinus's life was compiled in the Acta Sanctorum.

== See also ==
- History of San Marino
- Leo of Montefeltro
