= Flags of non-sovereign nations =

Flags of non-sovereign nations may refer to:

- Flags of formerly independent states, which were independent and have been subsumed into transnational states like North Korea
- Flags of unrecognized states, which have declared independence, but whose independence has not been recognised by the majority of the international community
