= List of national flags of sovereign states =

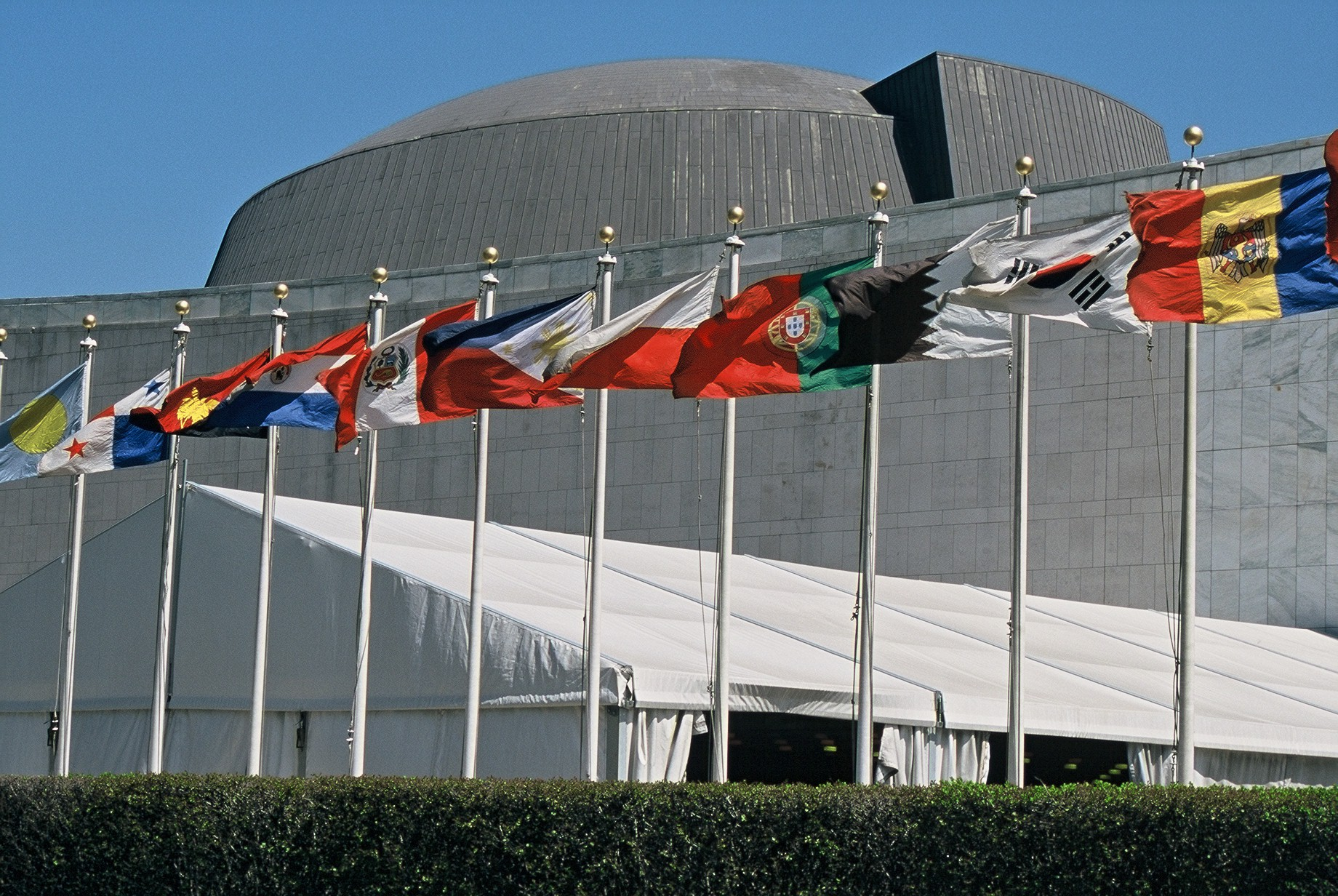
Various national flags at the headquarters of the United Nations

All 193 member states and 2 General Assembly non-member observer states of the United Nations, in addition to several de facto states, represent themselves with national flags. National flags generally contain symbolism of their respective state, and serve as an emblem which distinguishes themselves from other states in international politics. National flags are adopted by governments to strengthen national bonds and legitimate formal authority. Such flags may contain symbolic elements of their peoples, militaries, territories, rulers, and dynasties. The flag of Denmark is the oldest flag still in current use as it has been recognized as a national symbol since the 13th century.

== Background and definitions ==
According to the Collins English Dictionary, a national flag is "a flag that represents or is an emblem of a country". The word country can be used to refer to a nation-state or sovereign state, sometimes also called an independent state, though a country may also be a sub-division of a sovereign state, such as with the United Kingdom consisting of a union of four countries or nations — specifically two kingdoms (the countries of England and Scotland), a principality (the country of Wales), and a province (Northern Ireland). It is customary in international law that nation-states adopt a flag to distinguish themselves from other states.

National flags are considered to "provide perhaps the strongest, clearest statement of national identity," and governments have used them to promote and create bonds within the country, motivate patriotism, honor the efforts of citizens, and legitimate formal authority. Throughout history, elements within flags have been used to symbolize rulers, dynasties, territories, militaries, and peoples of their respective countries. Flags also conceptually represent a country's core values, such as group membership and love for the country. In 1975, American vexillologist Whitney Smith stated thus regarding the role of flags in society:

So strong is the tradition of flags, we may not be far from the truth in surmising that there is a law – not of nature, but of human society – which impels man to make and use flags. There is perhaps no more striking demonstration of this than the fact that, despite the absence of any international regulation or treaty requiring of a national flag, without exception every country has adopted at least one.

— Whitney Smith, Flags Through the Ages and Across the World, p. 32

According to the Oxford English Dictionary, a sovereign state is "a state or nation with a defined territory and a permanent population, which administers its own government, and which is recognized as not subject to or dependent upon another power." The amount of sovereign states in the world is generally derived from the number of member states of the United Nations (UN), although non-member states do exist, with such states being called de facto states. As of 2024, the UN currently includes 193 member states and 2 permanent observer states: Palestine and Vatican City. De facto states include Northern Cyprus, Abkhazia, South Ossetia, Transnistria, Kosovo, the Sahrawi Republic, Somaliland, and Taiwan.

The oldest flag of a sovereign state which is currently in use is the flag of Denmark, which has been recognized as a national symbol of the country since the 13th century, although the current version was officially adopted in 1867. All 193 member states and 2 observer states are represented by their respective flags at the Headquarters of the United Nations in New York City.

== Flags of UN member states and General Assembly non-member observer states ==
— No data

Flags of UN member states and observer states
Flag(s)	State	Aspect ratio	Date of latest adoption (Note: This refers to the date on which the most recent law or proclamation relating to the design of a flag was established by the government of a sovereign state post-independence, or the date of independence if the flag was legally adopted by a prenational government and retained on independence, but was never modified afterwards.)	Designer(s)	Description	Refs.
Afghanistan (Islamic Emirate)	Afghanistan (Note: The ruling Islamic Emirate of Afghanistan is mostly unrecognized. Therefore, the flag of the defunct Islamic Republic of Afghanistan continues to be used in some contexts, mostly outside Afghanistan.)	1:2	August 15, 2021	—N/a	White with a black Shahada in Thuluth script in the center. Hoist side depicted to right.	
Afghanistan (Islamic Republic)	Afghanistan	2:3	August 19, 2013	—N/a	Three equal vertical bands of black (hoist side), red, and green, with the national emblem (Note: Media related to Emblem of Afghanistan (2004–2021) at Wikimedia Commons) in white centered on the red band and slightly overlapping the other 2 bands.	
Albania	Albania	5:7	July 22, 2002	—N/a	Red with a black double-headed eagle in the center.	
Algeria	Algeria	2:3	July 3, 1962	Disputed (Note: The designer of the flag is disputed between Émilie Busquant and Chawki Mostefaï.)	Two equal vertical bands of green (hoist side) and white; a red, five-pointed star within a red crescent centered over the two-color boundary.	
Civil flag of Andorra	Andorra	7:10	April 22, 1866	Napoleon III	Three vertical bands of blue (hoist side), yellow, and red; the yellow band is slightly wider than the other 2 so that the ratio of band widths is 8:9:8	
State flag of Andorra	Andorra	7:10	May 5, 1993	—N/a	The civil flag with the national coat of arms of Andorra centered in the yellow band	
Angola	Angola	2:3	November 11, 1975	Henrique de Carvalho Santos	Two equal horizontal bands of red (top) and black with a centered yellow emblem consisting of a five-pointed star within half a cogwheel crossed by a machete (in the style of a hammer and sickle).	
Antigua and Barbuda	Antigua and Barbuda	2:3	November 1, 1981	Reginald Samuel	Red, with an inverted isosceles triangle based on the top edge of the flag; the triangle contains three horizontal bands of black (top), light blue, and white, with a yellow rising sun in the black band.	
Civil flag of Argentina	Argentina	5:8 or 9:14	February 27, 1812	Manuel Belgrano	Three equal horizontal bands of sky blue (top), white, and sky blue.	
State flag of Argentina	Argentina	5:8	November 23, 2010	Manuel Belgrano	Three equal horizontal bands of sky blue (top), white, and sky blue; centered in the white band is a radiant yellow sun with a human face (delineated in brown) known as the Sun of May.	
Armenia	Armenia	1:2	August 24, 1990	Hovhannes Kajaznuni; Stepan Malkhasyants	Three equal horizontal bands of red (top), blue, and orange.	
Australia (Note: Also known as the Australian National Flag)	Australia	1:2	February 14, 1954	Annie Dorrington; Ivor William Evans; Leslie Hawkins; Egbert Nuttall; William Stevens	Blue with the flag of the United Kingdom in the upper hoist-side quadrant and a large seven-pointed star in the lower hoist-side quadrant known as the Commonwealth or Federation Star; on the fly half is a representation of the Southern Cross constellation in white with one small, five-pointed star and four larger, seven-pointed stars.	
Civil flag of Austria	Austria	2:3	May 1, 1945	—N/a	Three equal horizontal bands of red (top), white, and red	
State flag of Austria	Austria	2:3	May 1, 1945	—N/a	The civil flag with the coat of arms of Austria in the center	
Azerbaijan	Azerbaijan	1:2	August 30, 1991	—N/a	Three equal horizontal bands of sky blue (top), red, and green; a vertical crescent moon and an eight-pointed star in white are centered in the red band.	
Bahamas	The Bahamas	1:2	July 10, 1973	Hervis Bain	Three equal horizontal bands of aquamarine (top), gold, and aquamarine, with a black equilateral triangle based on the hoist side.	
Bahrain	Bahrain	3:5	February 14, 2002	—N/a	Red with a white serrated band (five white points) on the hoist side.	
Bangladesh	Bangladesh	3:5	January 17, 1972	Quamrul Hassan	Green field with a large red disk shifted slightly to the hoist side of center.	
Barbados	Barbados	2:3	November 30, 1966	Grantley Prescod	Three equal vertical bands of ultramarine blue (hoist side), gold, and ultramarine blue with the head of a black trident centered on the gold band.	
Belarus	Belarus	1:2	May 1, 2012	—N/a (Note: The current flag is an adaptation of the original Soviet design by Mikhail Gusyev)	Red horizontal band (top) and green horizontal band one-half the width of the red band; a white vertical stripe on the hoist side bears Belarusian national ornamentation in red.	
Belgium	Belgium	13:15	January 23, 1831	Édouard Ducpétiaux; Lucien Jottrand	Three equal vertical bands of black (hoist side), yellow, and red.	
Belize	Belize	3:5	September 21, 1981	Everal Waight; Inéz Sánchez	Royal blue with a narrow red stripe along the top and the bottom edges; centered is a large white disk bearing the coat of arms.	
Benin	Benin	2:3	August 1, 1960	—N/a	Two equal horizontal bands of yellow (top) and red with a vertical green band on the hoist side.	
Bhutan	Bhutan	2:3	June 8, 1972	Mayeum Choying Wangmo Dorji	Divided diagonally from the lower hoist-side corner; the upper triangle is yellow and the lower triangle is orange; centered along the dividing line is a large black and white Druk facing away from the hoist side.	
Civil flag of Bolivia	Bolivia	2:3	August 5, 2009	—N/a	Three equal horizontal bands of red (top), yellow, and green.	
State flag of Bolivia	Bolivia	2:3	August 5, 2009	—N/a	The civil flag with the coat of arms of Bolivia centered wholly in the yellow band	
Wiphala	Bolivia	1:1	August 5, 2009	Germán Choquehuanca	A grid of 49 squares distributed in 7 columns by 7 rows, arranged in diagonal bands of 7 colors (white, yellow, orange, red, purple, blue, green) with white on the main diagonal.	
Bosnia and Herzegovina	Bosnia and Herzegovina	1:2	February 4, 1998	Mladen Kolobarić; Nedo Milčević; Sado Musabegović; Marco Oršolić; Ranko Risokević; Vehid Šehić; Gajo Sekulić	A wide blue vertical band on the fly side with a yellow isosceles triangle abutting the band and the top of the flag; the remainder of the flag is blue with seven full five-pointed white stars and two half stars top and bottom along the hypotenuse of the triangle.	
Botswana	Botswana	2:3	September 30, 1966	George Winstanley	Light blue with a horizontal white-edged black stripe in the center.	
Brazil	Brazil	7:10	May 11, 1992	Miguel Lemos; Manuel Pereira Reis; Raimundo Teixeira Mendes; Décio Villares	Green with a large yellow diamond in the center bearing a blue globe with 27 white stars (one for each state and the Federal District) arranged as in the sky over Rio de Janeiro at 8:30 a.m. on November 15, 1889, and containing a banner with the national motto ORDEM E PROGRESSO (lit. 'Order and progress').	
Brunei	Brunei	1:2	January 1, 1984	—N/a	Yellow with two diagonal bands of white (top, almost double width) and black starting from the upper hoist side; the national emblem in red is superimposed at the center.	
Bulgaria	Bulgaria	3:5	November 27, 1990	Stiliana Paraskevova; Ivan Paraskevov	Three equal horizontal bands of white (top), green, and red.	
Burkina Faso	Burkina Faso	2:3	August 4, 1984	Ferdinand Dabiré	Two equal horizontal bands of red (top) and green with a yellow five-pointed star in the center.	
Burundi	Burundi	3:5	September 27, 1982	—N/a	Divided by a white diagonal cross into red panels (top and bottom) and green panels (hoist side and fly side) with a white disk superimposed at the center bearing three red six-pointed stars outlined in green arranged in a triangular design (one star above, two stars below).	
Cambodia	Cambodia	2:3	June 30, 1993	—N/a	Three horizontal bands of blue (top), red (double width), and blue with a white, three-towered temple, representing Angkor Wat, outlined in black in the center of the red band.	
Cameroon	Cameroon	2:3	May 20, 1975	—N/a	Three equal vertical bands of green (hoist side), red, and yellow, with a yellow five-pointed star centered in the red band.	
Canada	Canada	1:2	February 15, 1965	George Stanley	Two vertical bands of red (hoist and fly side, half width) with a white square between them; an 11-pointed red maple leaf is centered in the white square.	
Cape Verde	Cape Verde	2:3	September 25, 1992	Pedro Gregório	Five unequal horizontal bands; the top-most band of blue - equal to one half the width of the flag - is followed by three bands of white, red, and white, each equal to 1/12 of the width, and a bottom stripe of blue equal to one quarter of the flag width; a circle of 10 yellow, five-pointed stars is centered on the red stripe and positioned 3/8 of the length of the flag from the hoist side.	
Central African Republic	Central African Republic	3:5	August 13, 1960	Barthélemy Boganda	Four equal horizontal bands of blue (top), white, green, and yellow with a vertical red band in center; a yellow five-pointed star to the hoist side of the blue band.	
Chad	Chad	2:3	November 6, 1959	Naiyia Amina Goudja	Three equal vertical bands of blue (hoist side), gold, and red.	
Chile	Chile	2:3	October 18, 1817	Unclear (Note: Sources contradict as to the designer of the flag. The following have been given as the flag's designer: Bernardo O'Higgins and José Ignacio Zenteno; José Ignacio Zenteno (sole credit); Carlos Wood)	Two equal horizontal bands of white (top) and red; a blue square the same height as the white band at the hoist-side end of the white band; the square bears a white five-pointed star in the center.	
China	China	2:3	October 1, 1949	Zeng Liansong	Red with a large yellow five-pointed star and four smaller yellow five-pointed stars (arranged in a vertical arc toward the middle of the flag) in the upper hoist-side corner.	
Colombia	Colombia	2:3	November 26, 1861	—N/a	Three horizontal bands of yellow (top, double-width), blue, and red.	
Comoros	Comoros	3:5	December 23, 2001	Suzanne Gauthier (Note: Gauthier designed the previous version of the flag, which the current one is based on.)	Four equal horizontal bands of yellow (top), white, red, and blue, with a green isosceles triangle based on the hoist; centered within the triangle is a vertical white crescent moon with the convex side facing the hoist and four white, five-pointed stars placed vertically in a line between the points of the crescent.	
Democratic Republic of the Congo	Democratic Republic of the Congo	3:4	February 18, 2006	Henry Morton Stanley (allegedly)	Sky blue field divided diagonally from the lower hoist corner to upper fly corner by a red stripe bordered by two narrow yellow stripes; a yellow, five-pointed star appears in the upper hoist corner	
Republic of the Congo	Republic of the Congo	2:3	June 10, 1991	—N/a	Divided diagonally from the lower hoist side by a yellow band; the upper triangle (hoist side) is green and the lower triangle is red.	
National flag of Costa Rica	Costa Rica	3:5	September 29, 1848	Pacífica Fernández Oreamuno	Five horizontal bands of blue (top), white, red (double width), white, and blue.	
State flag of Costa Rica	Costa Rica	3:5	May 5, 1998	—N/a	The civil flag, with the coat of arms of Costa Rica in a white elliptical disk placed toward the hoist side wholly within the red band	
Croatia	Croatia	1:2	December 22, 1990	Miroslav Šutej	Three equal horizontal bands of red (top), white, and blue superimposed by the coat of arms.	
Cuba	Cuba	1:2	May 20, 1902	Miguel Teurbe Tolón	Five equal horizontal bands of blue (top, center, and bottom) alternating with white; a red equilateral triangle based on the hoist side bears a white, five-pointed star in the center.	
Cyprus	Cyprus	2:3	April 24, 2006	İsmet Güney	Centered on a white field is a copper-colored silhouette of the island above two olive-green-colored, crossed olive branches.	
Czech Republic	Czech Republic	2:3	January 1, 1993	Jaroslav Kursa (allegedly)	Two equal horizontal bands of white (top) and red with a blue isosceles triangle based on the hoist side.	
Civil flag of Denmark	Denmark (Note: Denmark as a sovereign state is represented by the flag of Metropolitan Denmark, which excludes the Faroe Islands and Greenland.)	28:37	June 15, 1219	—N/a	Red with a white Nordic cross that extends to the edges of the flag; the vertical part of the cross is shifted to the hoist side.	
State flag of Denmark	Denmark	56:107	June 11, 1748	—N/a	Civil flag of Denmark in a swallowtail (flag) shape	
Djibouti	Djibouti	2:3	June 27, 1977	—N/a	Two equal horizontal bands of light blue (top) and light green with a white isosceles triangle based on the hoist side bearing a red five-pointed star in the center.	
Dominica	Dominica	1:2	November 3, 1990	Alwin Bully	Green with a centered cross of three equal bands - the vertical part is yellow (hoist side), black, and white and the horizontal part is yellow (top), black, and white; superimposed in the center of the cross is a red disk bearing a Sisserou parrot, unique to Dominica, encircled by 10 green, five-pointed stars edged in yellow.	
Civil flag of the Dominican Republic	Dominican Republic	2:3	November 6, 1844	Juan Pablo Duarte	A centered white cross that extends to the edges divides the flag into four rectangles − the top ones are ultramarine blue (hoist side) and vermilion red, and the bottom ones are vermilion red (hoist side) and ultramarine blue	
State flag of the Dominican Republic	Dominican Republic	2:3	November 6, 1844	Juan Pablo Duarte	The civil flag with a small coat of arms of the Dominican Republic at the center of the cross	
Ecuador	Ecuador	2:3	January 10, 1910	—N/a	Three horizontal bands of yellow (top, double width), blue, and red with the coat of arms superimposed at the center of the flag.	
Egypt	Egypt	2:3	October 4, 1984	ʻAlī Kāmil al-Dīb	Three equal horizontal bands of red (top), white, and black; the national coat of arms (a gold Eagle of Saladin facing the hoist side with a shield superimposed on its chest above a scroll bearing the name of the country in Arabic) centered in the white band.	
Civil flag of El Salvador	El Salvador	3:5	1912	—N/a	Three equal horizontal bands of cobalt blue (top), white, and cobalt blue with the words ""DIOS UNION LIBERTAD" centered in the white band	
State flag of El Salvador	El Salvador	189:335	September 14, 1972	—N/a	Three equal horizontal bands of cobalt blue (top), white, and cobalt blue with the national coat of arms centered in the white band	
Equatorial Guinea	Equatorial Guinea	2:3	August 21, 1979	—N/a	Three equal horizontal bands of green (top), white, and red, with a blue isosceles triangle based on the hoist side and the coat of arms centered in the white band; the coat of arms has six yellow six-pointed stars (representing the mainland and five offshore islands) above a gray shield bearing a silk-cotton tree and below which is a scroll with the motto UNIDAD, PAZ, JUSTICIA (lit. 'Unity, Peace, Justice').	
Eritrea	Eritrea	1:2	December 5, 1995	—N/a	Red isosceles triangle (based on the hoist side) dividing the flag into two right triangles; the upper triangle is green, the lower one is blue; a gold wreath encircling a gold olive branch is centered on the hoist side of the red triangle.	
Estonia	Estonia	7:11	November 21, 1918	Aleksander Mõttus	Three equal horizontal bands of blue (top), black, and white.	
Eswatini	Eswatini	2:3	September 6, 1968	Sobhuza II	Three horizontal bands of blue (top), red (triple width), and blue; the red band is edged in yellow; centered in the red band is a large black and white Nguni shield covering two spears and a staff decorated with feather tassels, all placed horizontally.	
Ethiopia	Ethiopia	1:2	February 6, 1996	—N/a	Three equal horizontal bands of green (top), yellow, and red, with a yellow pentagram and single yellow rays emanating from the angles between the points on a light blue disk centered on the three bands.	
Fiji	Fiji	1:2	October 10, 1970	Tessa Mackenzie	Light blue with the flag of the United Kingdom in the upper hoist-side quadrant and the Fijian shield centered on the outer half of the flag; the shield is taken from Fiji's coat of arms.	
Civil flag of Finland	Finland	11:18	January 1, 1995	Zacharias Topelius	White with a blue Nordic cross.	
State flag of Finland	Finland	11:18	1978	Zacharias Topelius	The civil flag with a red square bearing the coat of arms of Finland in the intersection between the two lines of the cross	
France	France	2:3	March 5, 1848	Jacques-Louis David	Three equal vertical bands of blue (hoist side), white, and red.	
Gabon	Gabon	3:4	August 9, 1960	Léon Augé; Pierre Claver Eyeghe	Three equal horizontal bands of green (top), yellow, and blue.	
Gambia	The Gambia	2:3	February 18, 1965	Louis Lucien Thomasi	Three equal horizontal bands of red (top), blue with white edges, and green.	
Georgia	Georgia	2:3	January 14, 2004	—N/a	White rectangle with a central red cross extending to all four sides of the flag; each of the four quadrants displays a small red bolnur-katskhuri cross.	
Civil flag of Germany	Germany	3:5	October 3, 1990	—N/a	Three equal horizontal bands of black (top), red, and gold	
Government flag of Germany	Germany	3:5	October 3, 1990	—N/a	The civil flag with the coat of arms of Germany in the center as a variant	
Ghana	Ghana	2:3	February 28, 1966	Theodosia Okoh	Three equal horizontal bands of red (top), yellow, and green, with a large black five-pointed star centered in the yellow band.	
Greece	Greece	2:3	December 22, 1978	—N/a	Nine equal horizontal stripes of blue alternating with white; a blue square bearing a white cross appears in the upper hoist-side corner.	
Grenada	Grenada	3:5 (Note: When used as an ensign, the ratio is 1:2.)	February 7, 1974	Anthony C. George	A rectangle divided diagonally into yellow triangles (top and bottom) and green triangles (hoist side and outer side), with a red border around the flag; there are seven yellow, five-pointed stars with three centered in the top red border, three centered in the bottom red border, and one on a red disk superimposed at the center of the flag; there is also a symbolic nutmeg pod on the hoist-side triangle.	
Civil flag of Guatemala	Guatemala	5:8	December 26, 1997	Juan José de Aycinena y Piñol (Note: The design adopted by the government was based on the proposal of Aycinena y Piñol and other members of the Aycinena Clan)	Three equal vertical bands of light blue (hoist side), white, and light blue	
State flag of Guatemala	Guatemala	5:8	December 26, 1997	Juan José de Aycinena y Piñol	The civil flag with the coat of arms of Guatemala centered in the white band	
Guinea	Guinea	2:3	November 10, 1958	—N/a	Three equal vertical bands of red (hoist side), yellow, and green.	
Guinea-Bissau	Guinea-Bissau	1:2	September 24, 1973	—N/a	Two equal horizontal bands of yellow (top) and green with a vertical red band on the hoist side; there is a black five-pointed star centered in the red band.	
Guyana	Guyana	3:5 (Note: When used as an ensign, the ratio is 1:2.)	May 26, 1966	Whitney Smith	Green with a red isosceles triangle (based on the hoist side) superimposed on a long, yellow arrowhead; there is a narrow, black border between the red and yellow, and a narrow, white border between the yellow and the green.	
Civil flag of Haiti	Haiti	3:5	February 25, 1986	Jean-Jacques Dessalines (Note: According to an apocryphal story, Catherine Flon is also credited.)	Two equal horizontal bands of blue (top) and red	
State flag of Haiti	Haiti	3:5	February 25, 1986	Jean-Jacques Dessalines	The civil flag with a centered white rectangle bearing the Coat of arms of Haiti	
Honduras	Honduras	1:2	January 18, 1949 (Note: Between 2022 and 2026, the Honduran government used a design with a turquoise blue color instead of navy blue.)	—N/a	Three equal horizontal bands of blue (top), white, and blue, with five blue, five-pointed stars arranged in an X pattern centered in the white band.	
Hungary	Hungary	1:2	May 23, 1957	—N/a	Three equal horizontal bands of red (top), white, and green.	
Civil flag of Iceland	Iceland	18:25	June 17, 1944	Matthías Þórðarson	Blue with a red cross outlined in white extending to the edges of the flag; the vertical part of the cross is shifted to the hoist side in the style of the Nordic cross.	
State flag of Iceland	Iceland	9:16	June 17, 1944	Matthías Þórðarson	The civil flag of Iceland in a swallowtail (flag) shape	
India	India	2:3	July 22, 1947	Pingali Venkayya	Three equal horizontal bands of saffron (subdued orange) (top), white, and green, with a blue chakra (24-spoked wheel) centered in the white band.	
Indonesia	Indonesia	2:3	August 17, 1950	Fatmawati (allegedly)	Two equal horizontal bands of red (top) and white.	
Iran	Iran	4:7	July 29, 1980	Hamid Nadimi	Three equal horizontal bands of green (top), white, and red; the national emblem in red is centered in the white band; the Takbir in white Arabic script is repeated 11 times along the bottom edge of the green band and 11 times along the top edge of the red band.	
Iraq	Iraq	2:3	January 22, 2008	—N/a	Three equal horizontal bands of red (top), white, and black; the Takbir in green Arabic script is centered in the white band.	
Ireland	Ireland	1:2	December 29, 1937	Thomas Francis Meagher	Three equal vertical bands of green (hoist side), white, and orange.	
Israel	Israel	8:11	October 28, 1948	Charles Askowith; Jacob Askowith	White with a blue hexagram known as the Star of David centered between two equal horizontal blue bands near the top and bottom edges of the flag.	
Italy	Italy	2:3	April 14, 2006	Giuseppe Compagnoni	Three equal vertical bands of green (hoist side), white, and red.	
Ivory Coast	Ivory Coast	2:3	December 3, 1959	—N/a	Three equal vertical bands of orange (hoist side), white, and green.	
Jamaica	Jamaica	1:2	August 6, 1962	—N/a	Diagonal yellow cross divides the flag into four triangles - green (top and bottom) and black (hoist side and fly side).	
Japan	Japan	2:3	August 13, 1999	Nichiren (allegedly)	White with a large red disk in the center.	
Jordan	Jordan	1:2	April 16, 1928 (Note: Between March and July 1958, Jordan and Iraq merged into the Arab Federation which bore a similar flag to that of Jordan, albeit without the star. Nevertheless, the flag of Jordan itself is considered to "have not changed since its independence.")	—N/a	Three equal horizontal bands of black (top), white, and green; a red isosceles triangle on the hoist side, and bearing a small white seven-pointed star.	
Kazakhstan	Kazakhstan	1:2	June 4, 1992	Shaken Niyazbekov	A gold sun with 32 rays above a soaring golden steppe eagle, both centered on a sky blue background; the hoist side displays a national ornamental pattern "koshkar-muiz" (the horns of the ram) in gold.	
Kenya	Kenya	2:3	December 12, 1963	Tom Mboya	Three equal horizontal bands of black (top), red, and green; the red band is edged in white; a large Maasai warrior's shield covering crossed spears is superimposed at the center.	
Kiribati	Kiribati	1:2	July 12, 1979	Arthur Grimble	The upper half is red with a yellow frigatebird flying over a yellow rising sun, and the lower half is blue with three horizontal wavy white stripes to represent the Pacific ocean.	
Kuwait	Kuwait	1:2	November 7, 1961	—N/a	Three equal horizontal bands of green (top), white, and red with a black trapezoid based on the hoist side.	
Kyrgyzstan	Kyrgyzstan	3:5	December 26, 2023	—N/a	Red field with a yellow sun in the center having 40 rays; in the center of the sun is a red ring crossed by two sets of four lines, a stylized representation of a "tunduk" - the crown of a traditional Kyrgyz yurt.	
Laos	Laos	2:3	December 2, 1975	Sila Viravong	Three horizontal bands of red (top), blue (double width), and red with a large white disk centered in the blue band.	
Latvia	Latvia	1:2	August 21, 1991	Ansis Cīrulis	Three horizontal bands of maroon (top), white (half-width), and maroon.	
Lebanon	Lebanon	2:3	September 21, 1990	Henri Pharaon	Three horizontal bands consisting of red (top), white (middle, double width), and red (bottom) with a green cedar tree centered in the white band.	
Lesotho	Lesotho	2:3	October 4, 2006	—N/a	Three horizontal stripes of blue (top), white, and green in the proportions of 3:4:3; centered in the white stripe is a black mokorotlo, a traditional Basotho straw hat.	
Liberia	Liberia	10:19	August 24, 1847	Susannah Lewis (lead); Sarah Draper; Mary Hunter; Rachel Johnson; Matilda Newport; J. B. Russworm; Collinette Teage	11 equal horizontal stripes of red (top and bottom) alternating with white; a white five-pointed star appears on a blue square in the upper hoist-side corner	
Libya	Libya	1:2	August 3, 2011	Omar Faiek Shennib	Three horizontal bands of red (top), black (double width), and green with a white crescent and star centered on the black stripe.	
National flag of Liechtenstein	Liechtenstein	3:5	September 18, 1982	—N/a	Two equal horizontal bands of blue (top) and red with a gold crown on the hoist side of the blue band.	
State flag of Liechtenstein	Liechtenstein	3:5	September 18, 1982	—N/a	Two equal horizontal bands of blue (top) and red with the coat of arms in the center.	
National flag of Lithuania	Lithuania	3:5	March 20, 1989	Jonas Basanavičius; Tadas Daugirdas; Antanas Žmuidzinavičius	Three equal horizontal bands of yellow (top), green, and red.	
Historical state flag of Lithuania	Lithuania	3:5	September 1, 2004	—N/a	Red field with the Coat of arms of Lithuania in the center.	
Luxembourg	Luxembourg	3:5 (Note: Although 3:5 is generally used, 1:2 is also accepted.)	March 17, 1972	—N/a	Three equal horizontal bands of red (top), white, and light blue.	
Civil flag and ensign of Luxembourg	Luxembourg	3:5	July 6, 2007	—N/a	Ten alternating stripes of white and light blue, with a red lion taken from the coat of arms superimposed on the center.	
Madagascar	Madagascar	2:3	October 21, 1958	Andrianome Ranaivosoa	Two equal horizontal bands of red (top) and green with a vertical white band of the same width on hoist side.	
Malawi	Malawi	2:3	May 28, 2012	—N/a	Three equal horizontal bands of black (top), red, and green with a radiant, rising, red sun centered on the black band.	
Malaysia	Malaysia	1:2	September 16, 1963	Mohamed Hamzah	14 equal horizontal stripes of red (top) alternating with white (bottom); there is a dark blue rectangle in the upper hoist-side corner bearing a yellow crescent and a yellow 14-pointed star.	
Maldives	Maldives	2:3	July 26, 1965	—N/a	Red with a large green rectangle in the center bearing a vertical white crescent moon; the closed side of the crescent is on the hoist side of the flag.	
Mali	Mali	2:3	March 1, 1961	Mariam Traore	Three equal vertical bands of green (hoist side), yellow, and red.	
Malta	Malta	2:3	September 21, 1964	—N/a	Two equal vertical bands of white (hoist side) and red; in the upper hoist-side corner is a representation of the George Cross, edged in red.	
Marshall Islands	Marshall Islands	10:19	May 1, 1979	Emlain Kabua	Blue with two stripes radiating from the lower hoist-side corner - orange (top) and white; a white star with four large rays and 20 small rays appears on the hoist side above the two stripes.	
Mauritania	Mauritania	2:3	October 12, 2017	—N/a	Green with a yellow, five-pointed star between the horns of a yellow, upward-pointing crescent moon; red stripes along the top and bottom edges.	
Mauritius	Mauritius	2:3	March 12, 1968	Gurudutt Moher	Four equal horizontal bands of red (top), blue, yellow, and green.	
Mexico	Mexico	4:7	September 16, 1968	Francisco Eppens (coat of arms)	Three equal vertical bands of green (hoist side), white, and red; Mexico's coat of arms (an eagle with a snake in its beak perched on a cactus) is centered in the white band.	
Micronesia	Micronesia	10:19	November 30, 1978	Gonzalo Santos (initial version)	Light blue with four white five-pointed stars centered.	
Moldova	Moldova	1:2	September 17, 2010	—N/a	Three equal vertical bands of Prussian blue (hoist side), chrome yellow, and vermilion red; the coat of arms is centered in the yellow band.	
National flag of Monaco	Monaco	4:5	April 9, 1881	—N/a	Two equal horizontal bands of red (top) and white.	
State flag of Monaco	Monaco	2:3	April 9, 1881	—N/a	White field with the coat of arms in the center.	
Mongolia	Mongolia	1:2	July 8, 2011	Dodiin Choidog	Three, equal vertical bands of red (hoist side), blue, and red; centered on the hoist-side red band in yellow is the national emblem ("soyombo" - a columnar arrangement of abstract and geometric representation for fire, sun, moon, earth, water, and the yin-yang symbol).	
Montenegro	Montenegro	1:2	September 16, 2004	—N/a	A red field bordered by a narrow golden-yellow stripe with the Montenegrin coat of arms centered; the arms consist of a double-headed golden eagle - symbolizing the unity of church and state - surmounted by a crown; the eagle holds a golden scepter in its right claw and a blue orb in its left; the breast shield over the eagle shows a golden lion passant on a green field in front of a blue sky.	
Morocco	Morocco	2:3	April 7, 1956	Disputed (Note: It has been claimed French general Hubert Lyautey personally designed the flag, however he only played a minor role in the process of its adoption. The design for the flag only emerged through negotiations between the French administration and the Makhzen.)	Red with a green pentacle (five-pointed, linear star) known as the Seal of Solomon in the center of the flag.	
Mozambique	Mozambique	2:3	May 1, 1983	Jorge Mwanamuzik (allegedly; initial version)	Three equal horizontal bands of green (top), black, and yellow with a red isosceles triangle based on the hoist side; the black band is edged in white; centered in the triangle is a yellow five-pointed star bearing a crossed rifle and hoe in black superimposed on an open white book.	
Myanmar	Myanmar	2:3	October 21, 2010	—N/a	Design consists of three equal horizontal stripes of yellow (top), green, and red; centered on the green band is a large white five-pointed star that partially overlaps onto the adjacent colored stripes.	
Namibia	Namibia	2:3	March 21, 1990	Frederick Brownell	A wide red stripe edged by narrow white stripes divides the flag diagonally from lower hoist corner to upper fly corner; the upper hoist-side triangle is blue and charged with a golden-yellow, 12-rayed sunburst; the lower fly-side triangle is green.	
Nauru	Nauru	1:2	January 31, 1968	—N/a	Blue with a narrow, horizontal, gold stripe across the center and a large white 12-pointed star below the stripe on the hoist side.	
Nepal	Nepal	≈ 1.219:1 (Note: Exact value is an irrational number which is a root of a quartic polynomial (sequence A230582 in the OEIS). See Flag of Nepal § Aspect ratio.)	December 16, 1962	Shankar Nath Rimal	Crimson red with a blue border around the unique shape of two overlapping right triangles; the smaller, upper triangle bears a white stylized moon and the larger, lower triangle displays a white 12-pointed sun.	
Netherlands	Netherlands	2:3	February 19, 1937	—N/a	Three equal horizontal bands of red (bright vermilion; top), white, and blue (cobalt).	
New Zealand	New Zealand	1:2	November 25, 1947	Albert Hastings Markham	Blue with the flag of the UK in the upper hoist-side quadrant with four red five-pointed stars edged in white centered in the outer half of the flag.	
Nicaragua	Nicaragua	3:5	August 27, 1972	—N/a	Three equal horizontal bands of blue (top), white, and blue with the national coat of arms centered in the white band.	
Rojinegra	Nicaragua	3:5	February 18, 2025		Two equal horizontal bands of red (top) and black (bottom).	
Niger	Niger	6:7	August 3, 1960	—N/a	Three equal horizontal bands of orange (top), white, and green with a small orange disk centered in the white band.	
National flag of Nigeria	Nigeria	1:2	October 1, 1960	Michael Taiwo Akinkunmi	Three equal vertical bands of green (hoist side), white, and green.	
Government flag of Nigeria	Nigeria	1:2	October 1, 1960	Michael Taiwo Akinkunmi	The civil flag, with the coat of arms in the center.	
North Korea	North Korea	20:33	March 24, 2026	Disputed (Note: See Flag of North Korea#Creation)	Three horizontal bands of blue (top), red (triple width), and blue; the red band is edged in white; on the hoist side of the red band is a white disk with a red five-pointed star.	
North Macedonia	North Macedonia	1:2	October 5, 1995	Miroslav Grčev	A yellow sun (the Sun of Liberty) with eight broadening rays extending to the edges of the red field.	
National flag of Norway	Norway	8:11	July 13, 1821	Meltzer Fredrik	Red with a blue cross outlined in white that extends to the edges of the flag; the vertical part of the cross is shifted to the hoist side in the style of the Nordic cross.	
State flag of Norway	Norway	16:27	July 13, 1821	Meltzer Fredrik	The civil flag of Norway in a tongued swallowtail (flag) shape	
Oman	Oman	4:7 (Note: Ratios of 1:2 and 5:9 are sometimes used.)	April 25, 1995	Qaboos bin Sa'id Al-Sa'id	Three horizontal bands of white (top), red, and green of equal width with a broad, vertical, red band on the hoist side; the national emblem (a khanjar dagger in its sheath superimposed on two crossed swords in scabbards) in white is centered near the top of the vertical band.	
Pakistan	Pakistan	2:3	August 14, 1947	Syed Amir-uddin Kedwaii	Green with a vertical white band on the hoist side; a large white crescent and star are centered in the green field.	
Palau	Palau	5:8	October 1, 1994	Blau Skebong	Light blue with a large yellow disk shifted slightly to the hoist side.	
Palestine	Palestine	1:2	November 15, 1988	—N/a	Three equal horizontal bands of black (top), white, and green with a red isosceles triangle based on the hoist side.	
Panama	Panama	2:3	June 6, 1904	Disputed (Note: Either Manuel Amador Guerrero or his son Manuel Encarnacíon Guerrero. Some have also suggested the former's wife María de la Ossa de Amador, although this is considered unlikely.)	Divided into four, equal rectangles; the top quadrants are white (hoist side) with a blue five-pointed star in the center and plain red; the bottom quadrants are plain blue (hoist side) and white with a red five-pointed star in the center.	
Papua New Guinea	Papua New Guinea	3:4	September 16, 1975	Karike Susan	Divided diagonally from upper hoist-side corner; the upper triangle is red with a soaring yellow bird of paradise centered; the lower triangle is black with five, white, five-pointed stars of the Southern Cross constellation centered.	
Paraguay (obverse)	Paraguay	11:20 (Note: The decree of July 2013 specifies a proportion of "1:0.55" for the "larger and smaller dimensions" respectively.)	July 15, 2013	—N/a	Three equal, horizontal bands of red (top), white, and blue with an emblem centered in the white band; the emblem is different on each side; the obverse (hoist side at the left) bears the national coat of arms; the reverse (hoist side at the right) bears a circular seal of the treasury.	
Paraguay (reverse)	Paraguay	11:20	July 15, 2013	—N/a	Three equal, horizontal bands of red (top), white, and blue with an emblem centered in the white band; the emblem is different on each side; the obverse (hoist side at the left) bears the national coat of arms; the reverse (hoist side at the right) bears a circular seal of the treasury.	
Civil flag of Peru	Peru	2:3	February 25, 1825	José de San Martín (initial version)	Three equal, vertical bands alternating red, white, red	
State flag of Peru	Peru	2:3	February 25, 1825	José de San Martín (initial version)	The civil flag with the coat of arms of Peru centered in the white band.	
Philippines	Philippines	1:2	February 12, 1998	Emilio Aguinaldo (Note: With help from Marcela Agoncillo, her daughter Lorenza, and Delfina Herbosa de Natividad)	Two equal horizontal bands of blue (top) and red; a white equilateral triangle is based on the hoist side; the center of the triangle displays a yellow sun with eight primary rays; each corner of the triangle contains a small, yellow, five-pointed star.	
National flag of Poland	Poland	5:8	August 1, 1919	—N/a	Two equal horizontal bands of white (top) and red	
Government flag of Poland	Poland	5:8	August 1, 1919	—N/a	The civil flag defaced with the coat of arms of Poland wholly within the white stripe	
Portugal	Portugal	2:3	June 11, 1911	Columbano Bordalo Pinheiro	Two vertical bands of green (hoist side, two-fifths) and red (three-fifths) with the national coat of arms (armillary sphere and Portuguese shield) centered on the dividing line.	
Qatar	Qatar	11:28	July 9, 1971	Abdullah bin Jassim Al Thani	Maroon with a broad white serrated band (nine white points) on the hoist side.	
Romania	Romania	2:3	December 27, 1989	—N/a	Three equal vertical bands of cobalt blue (hoist side), chrome yellow, and vermilion red.	
Russia	Russia	2:3	December 11, 1991	Peter I of Russia	Three equal horizontal bands of white (top), blue, and red.	
Rwanda	Rwanda	2:3	December 31, 2001	Alphonse Kirimobenecyo	Three horizontal bands of sky blue (top, double width), yellow, and green, with a golden sun with 24 rays near the fly end of the blue band.	
Saint Kitts and Nevis	Saint Kitts and Nevis	2:3	November 19, 1983	Edrice Lewis	Divided diagonally from the lower hoist side by a broad black band bearing two white, five-pointed stars; the black band is edged in yellow; the upper triangle is green, the lower triangle is red.	
Saint Lucia	Saint Lucia	1:2	February 22, 1979	Dunstan St. Omer	Cerulean blue with a gold isosceles triangle below a black arrowhead; the upper edges of the arrowhead have a white border.	
Saint Vincent and the Grenadines	Saint Vincent and the Grenadines	2:3	October 22, 1985	Julien van der Wal	Three vertical bands of blue (hoist side), gold (double width), and green; the gold band bears three green diamonds arranged in a V pattern.	
Samoa	Samoa	1:2	January 1, 1962	Malietoa Tanumafili II; Tupua Tamasese Mea'ole	Red with a blue rectangle in the upper hoist-side quadrant bearing five white, five-pointed stars representing the Southern Cross constellation.	
National flag of San Marino	San Marino	3:4	July 22, 2011	—N/a	Two equal horizontal bands of white (top) and light blue with the national coat of arms superimposed in the center; the main colors derive from the shield of the coat of arms, which features three white towers on three peaks on a blue field; the towers represent three castles built on San Marino's highest feature, Mount Titano: Guaita, Cesta, and Montale; the coat of arms is flanked by a wreath, below a crown and above a scroll bearing the word LIBERTAS (lit. 'liberty').	
Civil flag of San Marino	San Marino	3:4	July 22, 2011	—N/a	Two equal horizontal bands of white (top) and light blue.	
São Tomé and Príncipe	São Tomé and Príncipe	1:2	November 5, 1975	Manuel Pinto da Costa	Three horizontal bands of green (top), yellow (double width), and green with two black five-pointed stars placed side by side in the center of the yellow band and a red isosceles triangle based on the hoist side.	
Saudi Arabia	Saudi Arabia	2:3	March 15, 1973	—N/a	Green with the Shahada in large white Thuluth script. Hoist side depicted to right.	
Senegal	Senegal	2:3	August 20, 1960	—N/a	Three equal vertical bands of green (hoist side), yellow, and red with a small green five-pointed star centered in the yellow band.	
Civil flag of Serbia	Serbia	3:5	November 11, 2010	—N/a	Three equal horizontal stripes of red (top), blue, and white	
State flag of Serbia	Serbia	2:3	November 11, 2010	—N/a	The civil flag charged with the coat of arms of Serbia shifted slightly to the hoist side; the principal field of the coat of arms displays a white two-headed eagle on a red shield; a smaller red shield on the eagle is divided into four quarters by a white cross	
Seychelles	Seychelles	1:2	June 18, 1996	Philippe Uzice	Five oblique bands of blue (hoist side), yellow, red, white, and green (bottom) radiating from the bottom of the hoist side.	
Sierra Leone	Sierra Leone	2:3	April 27, 1961	—N/a	Three equal horizontal bands of light green (top), white, and light blue.	
Singapore	Singapore	2:3	August 9, 1965	Toh Chin Chye (Note: Deputy Prime Minister Toh designed the flag with two civil servants.)	Two equal horizontal bands of red (top) and white; near the hoist side of the red band, there is a vertical, white crescent (closed portion is toward the hoist side) partially enclosing five white five-pointed stars arranged in a circle.	
Slovakia	Slovakia	2:3	January 1, 1993	Ladislav Čisárik (current design); Ladislav Vrtel (current design)	Three equal horizontal bands of white (top), blue, and red; the Slovak coat of arms (consisting of a red shield bordered in white and bearing a white double-barred cross of Cyril and Methodius surmounting three blue hills) is centered over the bands but offset slightly to the hoist side.	
Slovenia	Slovenia	1:2	June 25, 1991	—N/a	Three equal horizontal bands of white (top), blue, and red; the coat of arms of Slovenia (a shield with the image of Triglav, Slovenia's highest peak, in white against a blue background at the center; beneath it are two wavy blue lines depicting seas and rivers, and above it are three six-pointed stars arranged in an inverted triangle) appears in the upper hoist side of the flag centered on the white and blue bands.	
Solomon Islands	Solomon Islands	1:2	July 7, 1978	Disputed (Note: Solomonese artist Thomas Giosa claimed to have submitted the winning design in a competition in 1975, however an unnamed New Zealand visual artist also claimed ownership of the design.)	Divided diagonally by a thin yellow stripe from the lower hoist-side corner; the upper triangle (hoist side) is blue with five white five-pointed stars arranged in an X pattern; the lower triangle is green.	
Somalia	Somalia	2:3	July 1, 1960	Mohammed Awale Liban	Light blue with a large white five-pointed star in the center.	
South Africa	South Africa	2:3	April 27, 1994	Frederick Brownell	Two equal width horizontal bands of red (top) and blue separated by a central green band that splits into a horizontal Y, the arms of which end at the corners of the hoist side; the Y embraces a black isosceles triangle from which the arms are separated by narrow yellow bands; the red and blue bands are separated from the green band and its arms by narrow white stripes.	
South Korea	South Korea	2:3	May 30, 2011	Lee Eung-jun	White with a red (top) and blue taijitu in the center; there is a different black trigram from the I Ching in each corner of the white field.	
South Sudan	South Sudan	1:2	July 9, 2011	—N/a	Three equal horizontal bands of black (top), red, and green; the red band is edged in white; a blue isosceles triangle based on the hoist side contains a gold, five-pointed star.	
Civil flag of Spain	Spain	2:3	1978	Antonio Valdés y Fernández Bazán	Three horizontal bands of red (top), yellow (double width), and red	
National flag of Spain	Spain	2:3	October 28, 1981	Antonio Valdés y Fernández Bazán	The civil flag with the national coat of arms of Spain on the hoist side of the yellow band.	
Sri Lanka	Sri Lanka	1:2	May 22, 1972	D.S. Senanayake	Yellow with two panels; the smaller hoist-side panel has two equal vertical bands of green (hoist side) and orange; the other larger panel depicts a yellow lion holding a sword on a maroon rectangular field that also displays a yellow bo leaf in each corner; the yellow field appears as a border around the entire flag and extends between the two panels.	
Sudan	Sudan	1:2	May 20, 1970	Abd al-Raḥman Aḥmad al-Jali	Three equal horizontal bands of red (top), white, and black with a green isosceles triangle based on the hoist side.	
Suriname	Suriname	2:3	November 25, 1975	Jack Pinas	Five horizontal bands of green (top, double width), white, red (quadruple width), white, and green (double width); a large, yellow, five-pointed star is centered in the red band.	
Sweden	Sweden	5:8	June 22, 1906	—N/a	Blue with a golden yellow cross extending to the edges of the flag; the vertical part of the cross is shifted to the hoist side in the style of the Nordic cross.	
Switzerland	Switzerland	1:1	December 12, 1889	—N/a	Red square with a bold, equilateral white cross in the center that does not extend to the edges of the flag.	
Syria	Syria (Note: Following the Fall of Damascus in December 2024, the official flag of Syria used by the Syrian transitional government differs from the flag used by the ousted Ba'athist government.)	2:3	December 8, 2024	—N/a	Three equal horizontal bands of green, white, and black; three small, red, five-pointed stars in a horizontal line centered in the white band.	
Tajikistan	Tajikistan	1:2	November 24, 1992	Zuhur Habibullaev (Note: Habibullaev led a committee to design the national flag.)	Three horizontal stripes of red (top), a wider stripe of white, and green; a gold crown surmounted by seven gold, five-pointed stars is located in the center of the white stripe.	
Tanzania	Tanzania	2:3	June 30, 1964	—N/a	Divided diagonally by a yellow-edged black band from the lower hoist-side corner; the upper triangle (hoist side) is green and the lower triangle is blue.	
Thailand	Thailand	2:3	September 28, 1917	Vajiravudh	Five horizontal bands of red (top), white, blue (double width), white, and red.	
Timor-Leste	Timor-Leste	1:2	May 20, 2002	Natalino Leitão	Red with a black isosceles triangle (based on the hoist side) superimposed on a slightly longer yellow arrowhead that extends to the center of the flag; a white star - pointing to the upper hoist-side corner of the flag - is in the center of the black triangle.	
Togo	Togo	1:φ ≈ 0.618:1 (Note: 2:3 and "approximately 3:5" have been given as the flag's ratio. It has also been claimed the proportions are golden.)	April 27, 1960	Paul Ahyi	Five equal horizontal bands of green (top and bottom) alternating with yellow; a white five-pointed star on a red square is in the upper hoist-side corner.	
Tonga	Tonga	1:2	November 4, 1875	Shirley Waldemar Baker	Red with a bold red cross on a white rectangle in the upper hoist-side corner.	
Trinidad and Tobago	Trinidad and Tobago	3:5	August 31, 1962	Carlisle Chang	Red with a white-edged black diagonal band from the upper hoist side to the lower fly side.	
Tunisia	Tunisia	2:3	July 3, 1999	—N/a	Red with a white disk in the center bearing a red crescent nearly encircling a red five-pointed star.	
Turkey	Turkey	2:3	May 29, 1936	—N/a	Red with a vertical white crescent moon (the closed portion is toward the hoist side) and white five-pointed star centered just outside the crescent opening.	
Turkmenistan	Turkmenistan	2:3	January 24, 2001	—N/a	Green field with a vertical red stripe near the hoist side, containing five tribal guls stacked above two crossed olive branches; five white, five-pointed stars and a white crescent moon appear in the upper corner of the field just to the fly side of the red stripe.	
National flag of Tuvalu	Tuvalu	1:2	April 11, 1997	Vione Natano	Light blue with the flag of the United Kingdom in the upper hoist-side quadrant; the outer half of the flag represents a map of the country with nine yellow, five-pointed stars on a blue field.	
State flag of Tuvalu	Tuvalu	1:2	April 11, 1997	Vione Natano	The National Flag defaced with coat of arms centered on the lower hoist-side quadrant.	
Uganda	Uganda	2:3	October 9, 1962	Grace Ibingira	Six equal horizontal bands of black (top), yellow, red, black, yellow, and red; a white disk is superimposed at the center and depicts a grey crowned crane (the national symbol) facing the hoist side.	
Ukraine	Ukraine	2:3	January 21, 1992	—N/a	Two equal horizontal bands of azure (top) and golden yellow.	
United Arab Emirates	United Arab Emirates	1:2	December 2, 1971	Abdullah Mohammed Al Maainah	Three equal horizontal bands of green (top), white, and black with a wider vertical red band on the hoist side.	
United Kingdom	United Kingdom	1:2 (Note: 3:5 aspect ratio is a valid alternative)	January 1, 1801	—N/a	Blue field on which the Cross of Saint Andrew counterchanged with the Cross of Saint Patrick, over all the Cross of Saint George fimbriated in white.	
United States	United States	10:19	July 4, 1960	Disputed (Note: Robert Heft has claimed, and has been credited by some sources, as the designer of the 50-star flag. However, this has been thoroughly disputed by Slate writer Alec Nevala-Lee who has instead suggested William R. Furlong as the flag's true designer.)	13 equal horizontal stripes of red (top and bottom) alternating with white; there is a blue rectangle in the upper hoist-side corner bearing 50 small, white, five-pointed stars arranged in nine offset horizontal rows of six stars (top and bottom) alternating with rows of five stars.	
National Pavilion	Uruguay	2:3	July 11, 1830	Joaquín Suárez	Nine equal horizontal stripes of white (top and bottom) alternating with blue; a white square in the upper hoist-side corner with a yellow sun bearing a human face (delineated in black) known as the Sun of May with 16 rays that alternate between triangular and wavy.	
Artigas flag	Uruguay	2:3	February 18, 1952	José Gervasio Artigas and José María de Roo	Three horizontal bands of blue (top), white, and blue with a Red Diagonal Stripe	
Flag of the Treinta y Tres	Uruguay	2:3	February 18, 1952	—N/a	Three horizontal bands of blue (top), white, and red. Upon the white band are printed the words Libertad o Muerte ('Freedom or Death').	
Uzbekistan	Uzbekistan	1:2	November 18, 1991	—N/a	Three equal horizontal bands of blue (top), white, and green separated by red fimbriations with a vertical, white crescent moon (closed side to the hoist) and 12 white, five-pointed stars shifted to the hoist on the top band.	
Vanuatu	Vanuatu	2:3	July 30, 1980	Kalontas Malon	Two equal horizontal bands of red (top) and green with a black isosceles triangle (based on the hoist side) all separated by a black-edged yellow stripe in the shape of a horizontal Y (the two points of the Y face the hoist side and enclose the triangle); centered in the triangle is a boar's tusk encircling two crossed namele fern fronds, all in yellow.	
Vatican City	Vatican City	1:1	June 7, 1929	—N/a	Two vertical bands of yellow (hoist side) and white with the arms of the Holy See, consisting of the crossed keys of Saint Peter surmounted by the three-tiered papal tiara, centered in the white band.	
Civil flag of Venezuela	Venezuela	2:3	March 9, 2006	—N/a	Three equal horizontal bands of yellow (top), blue, and red with the central blue band defaced by an arc of eight white five-pointed stars.	
State flag of Venezuela	Venezuela	2:3	March 9, 2006	—N/a	The civil flag with the coat of arms of Venezuela on the hoist side of the upper (yellow) band.	
Vietnam	Vietnam	2:3	July 2, 1976	Disputed (Note: The designer of the flag is disputed between Nguyễn Hữu Tiến and Lê Quang Sô.)	Red field with a large yellow five-pointed star in the center.	
Yemen	Yemen	2:3	May 22, 1990	—N/a	Three equal horizontal bands of red (top), white, and black.	
Zambia	Zambia	2:3	April 13, 1996	Gabriel Ellison	Green field with a panel of three vertical bands of red (hoist side), black, and orange below a soaring orange eagle, on the outer edge of the flag.	
Zimbabwe	Zimbabwe	1:2	April 18, 1980	Cedric Herbert	Seven equal horizontal bands of green (top), yellow, red, black, red, yellow, and green with a white isosceles triangle edged in black with its base on the hoist side; a yellow Zimbabwe Bird is superimposed on a red five-pointed star in the center of the triangle.	

== Flags of de facto states ==
Flag(s)	State	Aspect ratio	Date of latest adoption	Designer(s)	Description	Refs.
Abkhazia	Abkhazia	1:2	July 23, 1992	Valery Gamgia	Seven equal horizontal stripes of green (top and bottom) alternating with white; a red rectangle in the upper hoist-side corner with a white dexter hand appaumé below an arc of seven white five-pointed stars.	
Cook Islands	Cook Islands	1:2	August 4, 1979	Len Staples	A British blue ensign defaced by a circle of fifteen white five-pointed stars	
Kosovo	Kosovo	5:7	February 17, 2008	Muhamer Ibrahimi	Centered on a dark blue field is a gold-colored silhouette map of Kosovo surmounted by six white, five-pointed stars arrayed in a slight arc.	
Niue	Niue	1:2	October 15, 1975	Patricia Rex	A British ensign with a yellow field, with the Union Jack defaced by a stylised Southern Cross of five yellow five-pointed stars	
Northern Cyprus	Northern Cyprus	2:3	March 13, 1984	Emin Çizenel	White with a vertical red crescent moon (the closed portion is toward the hoist side) and red five-pointed star centered just outside the crescent opening centered between two equal horizontal red bands near the top and bottom edges of the flag.	
Sahrawi Arab Democratic Republic	Sahrawi Arab Democratic Republic	1:2	February 27, 1976	El-Ouali Mustapha Sayed	Three equal horizontal bands of black (top), white, and green with a red isosceles triangle based on the hoist side. a red, five-pointed star and crescent (the closed portion is toward the hoist side) centered in the white band.	
Somaliland	Somaliland	1:2	October 14, 1996	—N/a	Three equal horizontal bands of green (top), white, and red; a white Shahada centered in the green band; a black, five-pointed star centered in the white band.	
South Ossetia	South Ossetia	1:2	March 30, 1992	—N/a	Three equal horizontal bands of white (top), red, and yellow.	
Taiwan	Taiwan	2:3	October 25, 1945	Lu Haodong (canton); Sun Yat-sen (red field)	Red field with a dark blue rectangle in the upper hoist-side corner bearing a white sun with 12 triangular rays.	
Transnistria	Transnistria	1:2	July 3, 2000	—N/a	Three horizontal bands of red (top), green (half-width), and red with a yellow hammer and sickle below a yellow outline of a five-pointed star in the upper hoist-side corner of the top band.	
Russian flag used for Transnistria (Note: According to an April 2017 law passed by the Supreme Council, the national flag of Russia is co-officially the national flag of Transnistria.)	Transnistria	1:2 (Note: The aspect ratio differs from the flag adopted by Russia, which is 2:3.)	April 12, 2017	Peter I of Russia	Three equal horizontal bands of white (top), blue, and red.	(Note: See the entry for Russia for further references.)

== See also ==
- Vexillology
- Vexillological symbol
- Glossary of vexillology
- Civil flag
- Ensign (flag)
- Ethnic flag
- Flag families
- Maritime flag
- National flag
- National coat of arms
- National emblem
- National seal
- National symbol
- State flag
- Galleries and lists:
  - Flags of Europe
  - Gallery of sovereign state flags
  - Gallery of flags of dependent territories
  - Lists of flags
  - List of flags by design
  - List of national flags by design
  - List of Japanese flags
  - List of United Kingdom flags
  - List of Antarctic flags
  - List of flags by color combination
  - List of sovereign states by date of current flag adoption
  - Gallery pages of flags of country subdivisions

== Bibliography ==
- Porsche-Ludwig, Markus; Chen, Ying-Yu (2022a). Handbook Near and Middle East States: Geography - History - Culture - Politics - Economy. LIT Verlag Münster. ISBN 978-3-643-91136-0.
- Porsche-Ludwig, Markus; Chen, Ying-Yu (November 8, 2022). Handbook of Asian States: Part 1: Geography - History - Culture - Politics - Economy. LIT Verlag. ISBN 978-3-643-96100-6.
- Znamierowski, Alfred (September 20, 2020). The World Encyclopedia of Flags: An Illustrated Guide to International Flags, Banners, Standards and Ensigns. Anness Publishing. ISBN 978-0-7548-3480-9.
- Mumford, Simon, ed. (November 16, 2021). Complete Flags of the World: The Ultimate Pocket Guide (7th ed.). Dorling Kindersley Publishing, Incorporated. ISBN 978-0-241-52356-8.
