= Pedro Bruno =

Pedro Bruno may refer to:

- Pedro Paulo Bruno (1888–1949), Brazilian painter
- Pedro Luis Bruno (born 1988), Argentine cricketer
