= Décio Villares =

Brazilian artist (1851–1931)

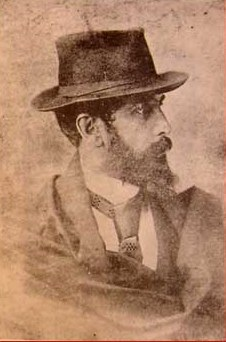
- Décio Villares (before 1900)
- Born: Décio Rodrigues Villares; 1 December 1851; Rio de Janeiro, Brazil
- Died: 21 June 1931 (aged 79); Rio de Janeiro, Brazil
- Education: Academia Imperial de Belas Artes
- Known for: Painting, sculpture, caricatures, graphic design
- Notable work: Designer of the blue disc on the Brazilian flag
- Spouse: Maria de Souza Martins (m. 1901)

Décio Rodrigues Villares (1 December 1851 – 21 June 1931) was a Brazilian painter, sculptor, caricaturist, and graphic designer. He is best known for helping to design the blue disc on the flag of Brazil and his designs for the monument honoring Júlio de Castilhos.

== Biography ==
His father, José Rodrigues Villares, was a Lieutenant Colonel, a member of the Nova Iguaçu city council, and a participant in the Liberal rebellions of 1842. Although his family was not wealthy, they were politically connected (his uncle, Manoel Rodrigues Villares (1804-1878), served as a Minister of the Supreme Federal Court), so he was able to gain entrance to the Colégio Pedro II and the Academia Imperial de Belas Artes. There, he studied with Victor Meirelles and Pedro Américo.

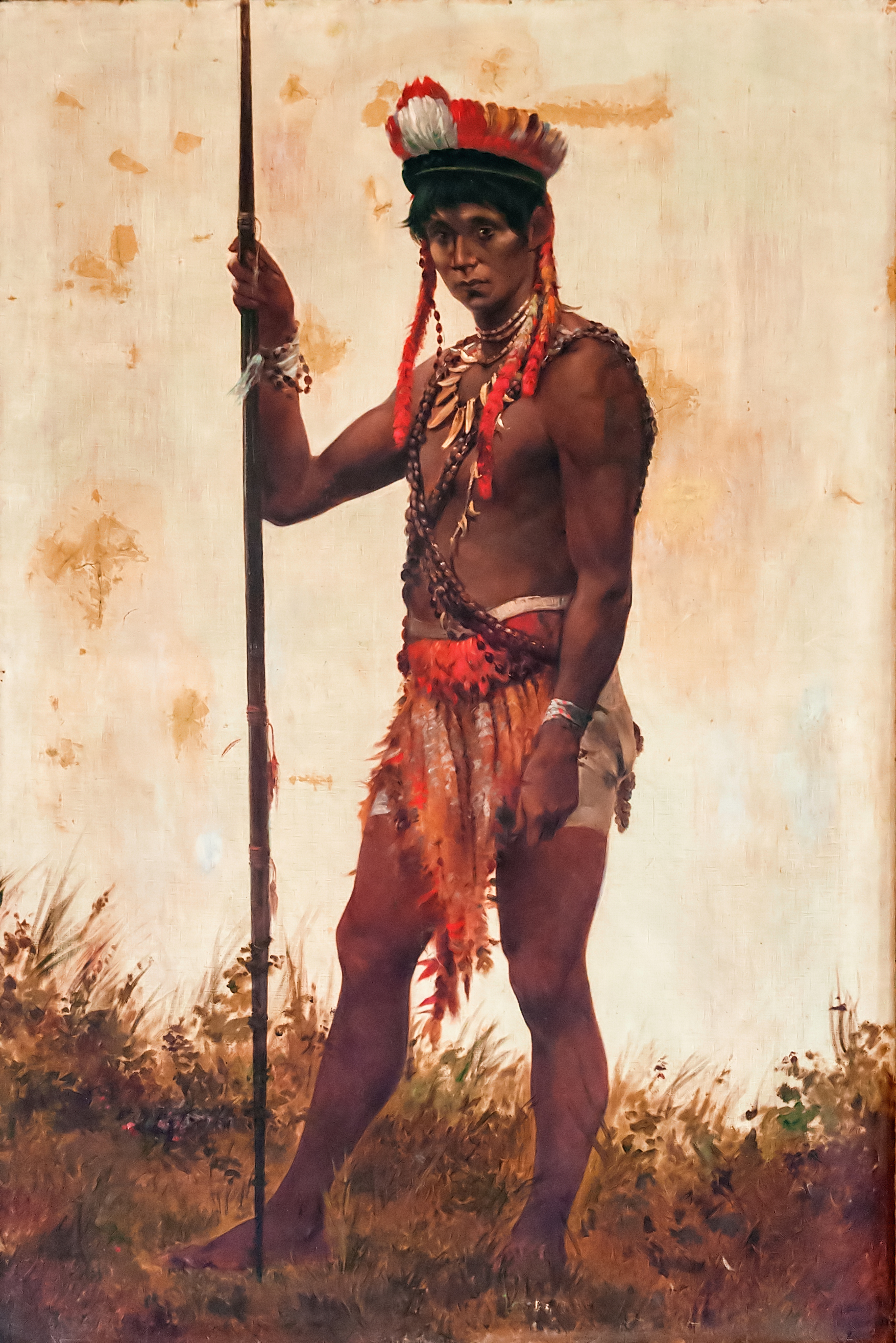
Índio from the Vaupés River region

In 1870, he began providing caricatures for the satirical magazine, Comédia Social, published by Américo and his younger brother, Aurélio de Figueiredo, who was also a student there at that time. For unknown reasons, he was frequently absent from his classes, did not participate in exhibitions and did not compete for the travel scholarship. Eventually, he dropped out. For the next nine years, he travelled, initially (1872) to Paris.

There, he studied in the workshops of Alexandre Cabanel. In 1874, he was awarded a gold medal at the Salon for his painting of Paolo Malatesta and Francesca da Rimini, which was praised by the notoriously difficult-to-please art critic, Eugène Verón. During that period, he was first exposed to the positivist philosophy of Auguste Comte and abandoned Catholicism. This would result in his being rejected for a teaching position at the Académie des Beaux-Arts. He then went from Paris to Florence, where Pedro Américo maintained a studio. He may have studied sculpture with Rodolfo Bernardelli. It is not known exactly how long he stayed in Italy, although letters indicate that he was still there in 1878. It is possible that he returned briefly to France.

What is known for certain is that he returned to Brazil in 1881. Soon after, he and Aurélio de Figueiredo received a major commission: eighteen paintings of the Aimoré people for display at the Brazilian Anthropological Exhibition of 1882; made from sketches and photographs. The general publicity accorded to the exhibition enabled him to establish himself and launch a successful career. In 1887, he and Almeida Júnior were chosen to replace Victor Meirelles in the history painting department at the Academia Imperial, but they never did. Three years later, he and De Figueiredo were part of a group that presented a proposal for a new method of teaching that would emphasize the master/apprentice relationship and abolish the Academia.

In 1901, he married Maria Dolores de Souza Martins. They received both Catholic and positivist rites (what the positivists called a "mixed marriage") but, following positivist practice, declared their desire for "eternal widowhood". It proved to be a difficult marriage. She was addicted to morphine and, once, in a drug-induced haze, set their apartment on fire. She was arrested and sent to a sanatorium and Villares, who was on a lengthy business trip, allowed her to stay there. After a year, she charged him with psychological cruelty, abandonment and theft of her family inheritance. Despite this, they never had a formal separation. When he was forced to be away from home, she was watched over by members of the Positivist Church. When he died, in 1931, she burned down his studio.

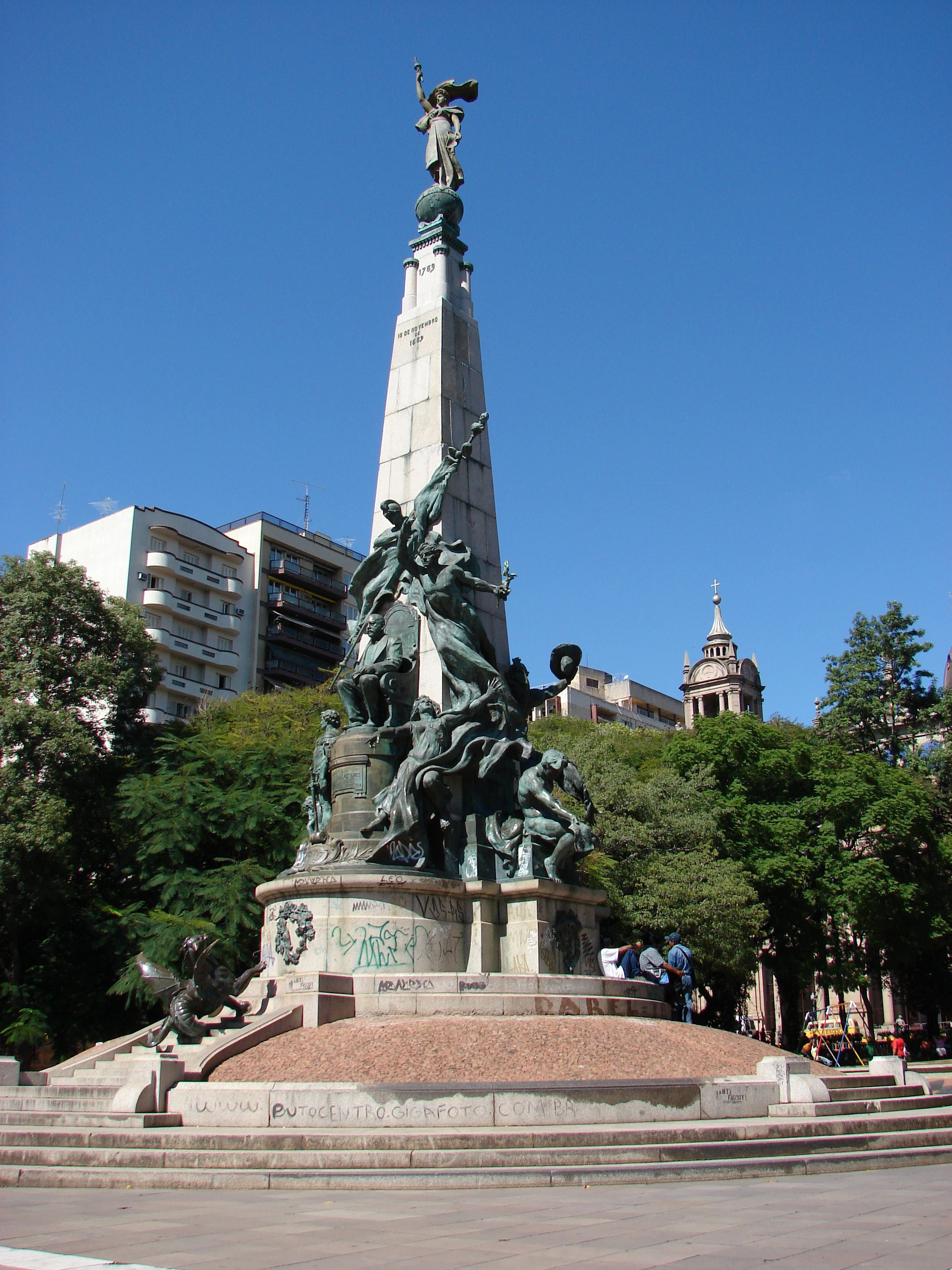
Monument to Júlio de Castilhos

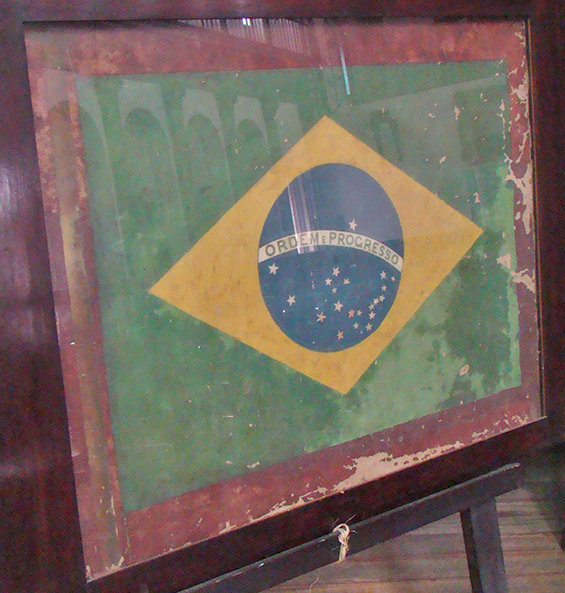
Prototype for the Brazilian flag

Much of his work was funded by the Positivist Church; including a medallion, to be placed on the grave of Dante Alighieri in Ravenna, and a monument to Benjamin Constant. Although he has often received little credit, he participated in the creation of the Brazilian flag, conceived by Raimundo Teixeira Mendes (a member of the Positivist Church); helping to design the blue disc and the placement of the words "Ordem e Progresso". He also painted the prototype that was used by the seamstresses who made the first flags. The painting was stolen in 2010 and has not been recovered.

He may have served as the inspiration for Julião Vilela, a character in Mocidade Morta, a novel by the art critic, Gonzaga Duque, who felt that Villares made poor aesthetic choices and never lived up to his potential.
