= Flag of Brazil =

Federative Republic of Brazil
- A Auriverde; Verde e amarela
- Use: National flag and ensign
- Proportion: 7:10
- Adopted: 19 November 1889; 137 years ago (21-star version); 11 May 1992; 34 years ago (current 27-star version)
- Design: A green field with a large yellow rhombus, oriented with one vertex pointing upwards, in the center, bearing a blue disk which forms a celestial globe depicting twenty-seven small white five-pointed stars spanned by a white equatorial curved band with the national motto Ordem e Progresso (lit. 'Order and Progress') written in green.
- Designed by: Raimundo Teixeira Mendes

The national flag of Brazil is a blue disc depicting a starry sky (which includes the Southern Cross) spanned by a curved band inscribed with the national motto Ordem e Progresso (Brazilian Portuguese pronunciation: [ˈɔʁdẽj i pɾoˈɡɾɛsu]) ('Order and Progress'), within a yellow rhombus on a green field. It was officially adopted on 19 November 1889, four days after the Proclamation of the Republic, to replace the flag of the Empire of Brazil. The concept was the work of Raimundo Teixeira Mendes, with the collaboration of Miguel Lemos, Manuel Pereira Reis and Décio Villares.

The green field and yellow rhombus from the previous imperial flag were preserved (though slightly modified in hue and shape). In the imperial flag, the green represented the House of Braganza of Pedro I, the first Emperor of Brazil, while the yellow represented the House of Habsburg of his wife, Empress Maria Leopoldina. A blue circle with white five-pointed stars replaced the arms of the Empire of Brazil –its position in the flag reflects the sky over the city of Rio de Janeiro on 15 November 1889. The motto Ordem e Progresso is derived from Auguste Comte's motto of positivism: "L'amour pour principe et l'ordre pour base; le progrès pour but" ("Love for principle and order for/as the basis; progress for/as the purpose").

Each star corresponds to a Brazilian Federal Unit and is sized according to the apparent magnitude of the corresponding real star. According to Brazilian Law, the flag must be updated in case of the creation or extinction of a state. At the time the flag was first adopted in 1889, it had 21 stars. It then received one more star in 1960 (representing the state of Guanabara), then another in 1968 (representing Acre), and finally four more stars in 1992 (representing Amapá, Roraima, Rondônia and Tocantins), totaling 27 stars in its current version.

== History ==
=== Colonial Brazil (1500–1815) ===
The flag of the Princes of Brazil was a standard for the Portuguese heir, though often used in Brazil due to the namesake of the princes

The Portuguese territories in the Americas, corresponding roughly to what is now Brazil, never had their own official flag, since Portuguese tradition encouraged hoisting the flag of the Kingdom of Portugal in all territories of the Portuguese Crown.

The first Brazilian vexillological symbols were private maritime flags used by Portuguese merchant ships that sailed to Brazil. A flag with green and white stripes was used until 1692. The green and white colors represented the House of Braganza and the national colours of Portugal. In 1692, that flag was no longer used by ships that sailed to Brazil and became the flag of the merchant vessels in coastal Portugal. In 1692, a new flag was introduced for merchant vessels sailing to Brazil. The new flag had a white field with a golden armillary sphere. The armillary sphere had served as the personal emblem of King Manuel I of Portugal (reigned 1494–1521). During his reign Portuguese ships used it widely, and eventually it became a national emblem of Portugal and, more specifically, of the Portuguese empire. A similar flag was introduced for the Portuguese ships that sailed to India, but with a red armillary sphere. Despite representing the entire Portuguese empire, the armillary sphere began to be used more extensively in Brazil – the largest and most developed colony at the time – not only in maritime flags, but also on coins and other media. It eventually became the unofficial ensign of Brazil.

=== United Kingdom of Portugal, Brazil, and the Algarves (1815–1822) ===
Flag of the United Kingdom of Portugal, Brazil and the Algarves (1816–1822)

In 1815, Brazil was elevated to the rank of kingdom, and the kingdoms of Portugal, Brazil and the Algarves were united as a single state – the United Kingdom of Portugal, Brazil and the Algarves. The Charter Act of 1816 established the insignia of the new kingdom. It specified that the arms of the Kingdom of Brazil was to be composed of a gold armillary sphere on a blue field. During this time, the flag of Brazil was the flag of the United Kingdom of Portugal, Brazil, and the Algarves.

=== Empire of Brazil (1822–1889) ===
Flag of the independent Kingdom of Brazil (18 September – 1 December 1822)

First flag of the Empire of Brazil with 19 stars (1822–1853). On 29 August 1853, Imperial Law No. 704 created the Province of Paraná, resulting in the addition of a 20th star.

Second flag of the Empire of Brazil with 20 stars (1853–1889)

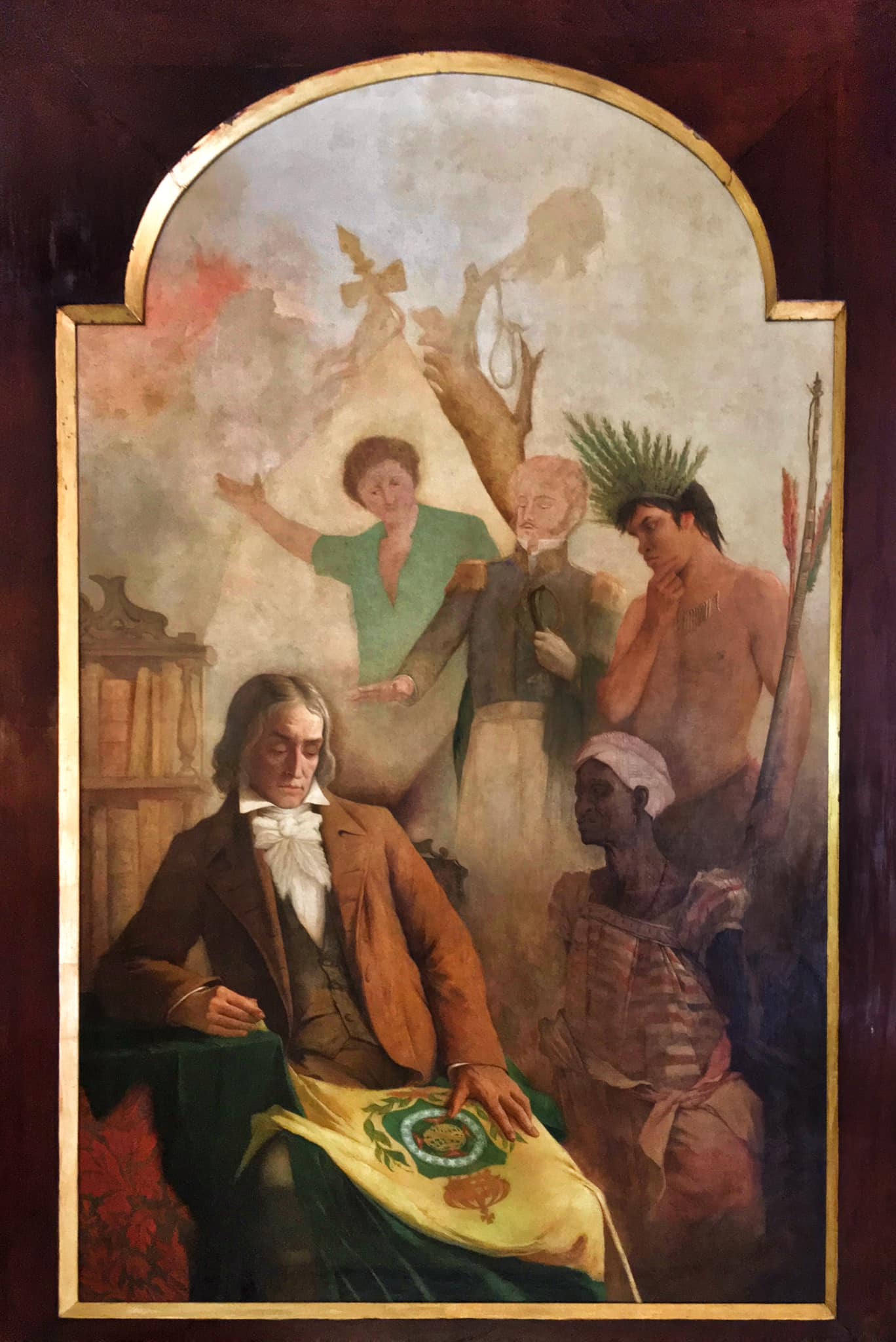
The Founding of the Brazilian Fatherland, a 1899 allegorical painting depicting statesman José Bonifácio de Andrada e Silva, one of the founding fathers of the country, with the imperial flag and Brazil's three major ethnic groups

The flag of Brazil was designed by Jean-Baptiste Debret as the Royal Standard of the Prince Royal of the United Kingdom of Portugal, Brazil and the Algarves, Pedro I.

After the Brazilian Declaration of Independence, and with the coronation of Pedro I as Emperor of Brazil, the Royal Standard was modified to become the flag of the Empire of Brazil. The new flag featured the imperial coat of arms within a yellow rhombus, on a green field. The green and yellow colors represented the dynastic houses of Pedro I and his consort Maria Leopoldina of Austria.

The imperial flag was slightly modified during the reign of Pedro II, when an extra star was added to the imperial arms to conform to the new territorial organization of the country.

=== Republic of Brazil (1889–present) ===
Provisional flag of the Republic of the United States of Brazil (15–19 November 1889)

Flag from 1889–1960
71 years of use
(21 stars)

Flag from 1960–1968
8 years of use
(22 stars)

Flag from 1968–1992
24 years of use
(23 stars)

Upon the proclamation of the Republic, one of the civilian leaders of the movement, the jurist Ruy Barbosa, proposed a design for the nation's new flag strongly inspired by the flag of the United States. It was flown from 15 to 19 November 1889, when marshal Deodoro da Fonseca (acting as provisional president of Brazil) vetoed the design, citing concerns that it looked too similar to the flag of another country.

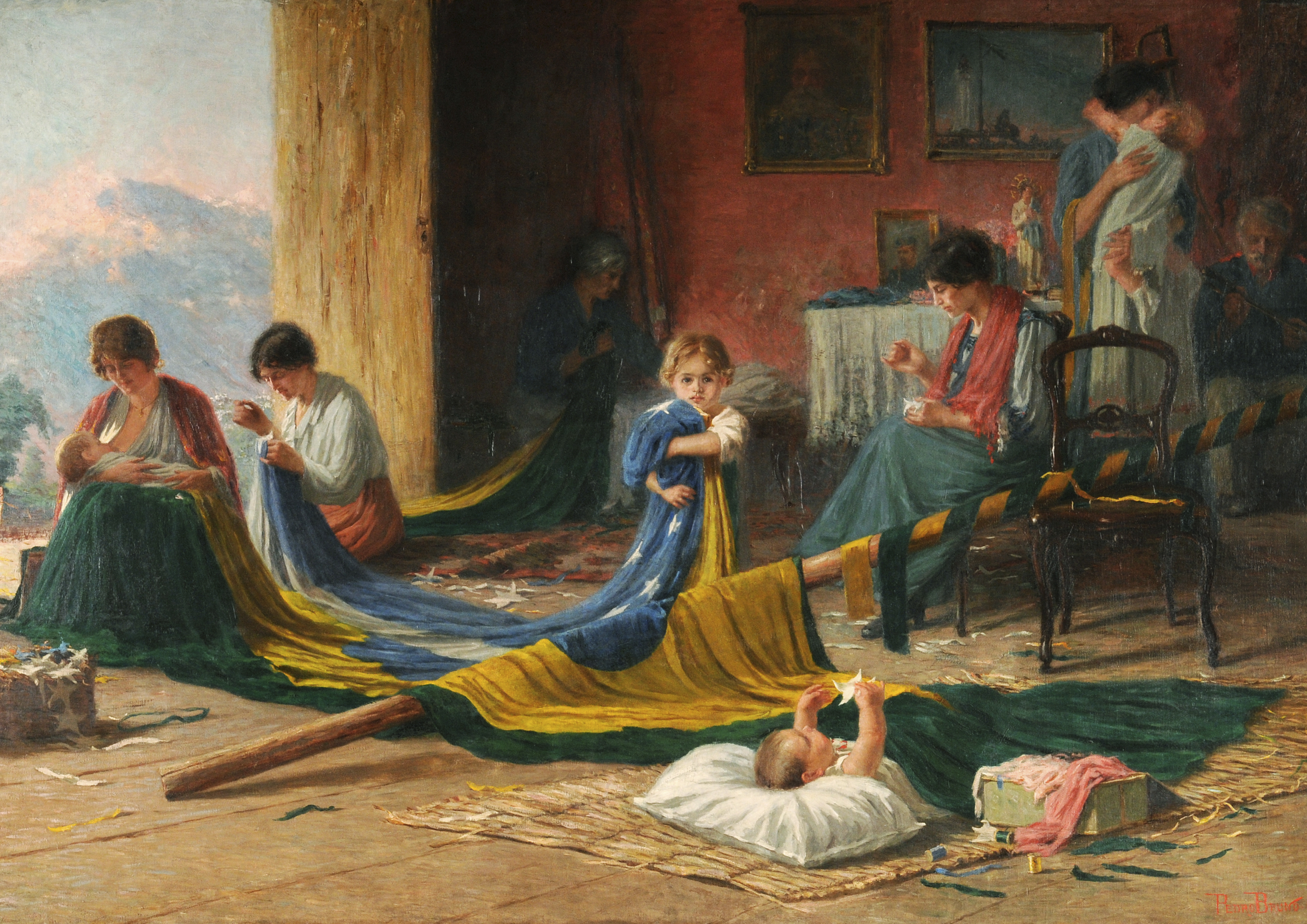
A Pátria (The Fatherland) by Pedro Paulo Bruno, a 1919 painting depicting the Brazilian flag being embroidered by a family

Fonseca suggested that the flag of the new republic should resemble the old imperial flag. This was intended to underscore continuity of national unity during the transition from a constitutional monarchy to a republic. Raimundo Teixeira Mendes presented a project in which the imperial coat of arms was replaced by a blue celestial globe and the positivist motto. It was presented to Fonseca, who promptly accepted. The flag was designed by a group formed by Raimundo Teixeira Mendes, Miguel Lemos, Manuel Pereira Reis and Décio Villares. It was officially adopted on 19 November 1889.

The number of stars was increased from 21 to 22 on 21 April 1960, upon the creation of the state of Guanabara. Decree No. 48,124 of 16 April 1960 ordered the incorporation of a new star representing Guanabara and provided that the decree would enter into force on 21 April, the date on which Brasília became the national capital and the former Federal District became the state of Guanabara. A 23rd star was added on 30 May 1968, following the elevation of Acre to statehood in 1962.

In contrast to many other national flags with elements representing political subdivisions, modifications to the flag of Brazil were not always made promptly upon political reorganisation, resulting in multi-year periods of history where there was a mismatch between the number of stars and the number of states and federal districts. The most recent modification was made on 11 May 1992, with the addition of four stars to the celestial globe (representing states created between 1982 and 1991), and a slight change in the stars' positions was made to match the astronomical coordinates correctly.

== Design ==
Decree No. 4, issued on 19 November 1889, legally replaced the flag used under the constitutional monarchy with the new national flag. The last change was held on 11 May 1992, Law No. 8.421, altered the celestial globe with the addition of six stars.

=== Construction ===
Construction sheet with the official dimensions of the flag

The precise positions of the 27 stars on the globe makes the Brazilian flag one of the most complicated national flags to construct. The official design is defined by Law No. 5,700, issued on 1 September 1971. The flag's length is twenty modules and the width, fourteen, translating into an aspect ratio of 10:7. The distance of the vertices of the yellow rhombus to the outer frame is a module and seven-tenths (1.7 m). The blue circle in the middle of the yellow rhombus has a radius of three and a half modules (3.5 m). The center of the arcs of the white band is two modules (2 m) to the left of the meeting point of the extended vertical diameter of the circle with the base of the outer frame. The radius of the lower arc of the white band is eight modules (8m) and the radius of the upper arc of the white band is eight and a half modules (8.5 m). The width of the white band is a half of a module (0.5 m).

The caption "Ordem e Progresso" is written in green letters. The letter P lies on the vertical diameter of the circle. The letters of the word "Ordem" and the word "Progresso" are a third of a module (0.33 m) tall. The width of these letters is three-tenths of a module (0.30 m). The conjunction E has a height of three-tenths of a module (0.30 m) and a width of a quarter of a module (0.25 m).

The stars are of five different sizes: first, second, third, fourth and fifth magnitudes. They are drawn within circles whose diameters are: three-tenths of a module (0.30 m) for the first magnitude, a quarter of a module (0.25 m) for the second magnitude; a fifth of a module (0.20 m) for the third magnitude, a seventh of a module (0.14 m) for the fourth magnitude, and a tenth of a module (0.10 m) for the fifth magnitude.

==== Stars ====
A list of constellations and stars on the map: 1. Procyon (α Canis Minoris); 2. Canis Major: five stars, the largest depicting Sirius; 3. Canopus (α Carinae); 4. Spica (α Virginis); 5. Hydra: two stars, the larger being Alphard; 6. Southern Cross: five stars, the largest depicting Alpha Crucis; 7. Sigma Octantis (σ Octantis, south pole star); 8. Triangulum Australe: three stars of similar size; 9. Scorpius: eight stars, the largest depicting Antares

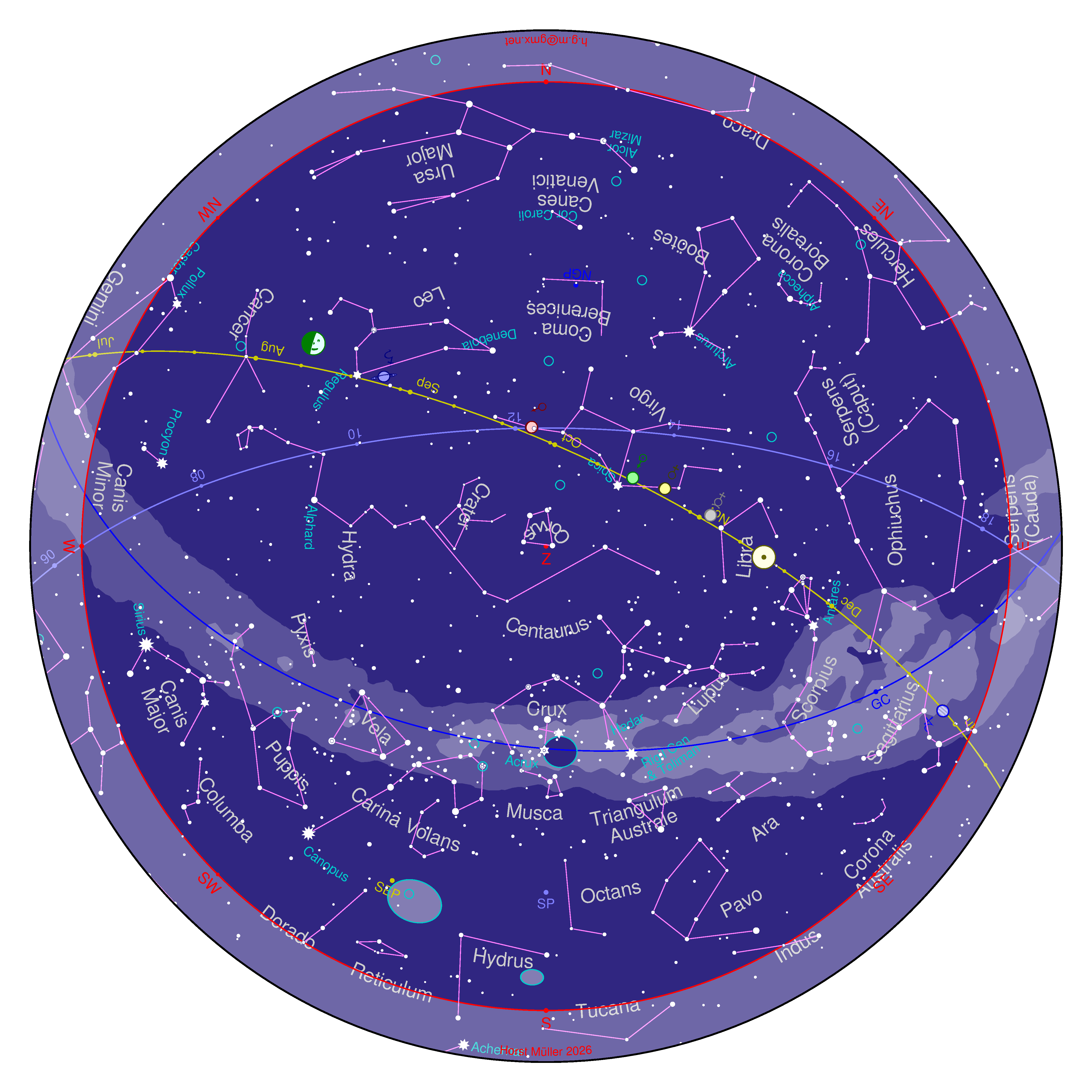
Celestial map providing the basis of the flag of Brazil

Paulo Araújo Duarte of the Federal University of Santa Catarina claims that "the creators of our republican flag intended to represent the stars in the sky at Rio de Janeiro at 8:30 in the morning on 15 November 1889, the moment at which the constellation of the Southern Cross was on the meridian of Rio de Janeiro and the longer arm [of the cross] was vertical". Another article, citing "O Céu da Bandeira (The Sky of the Flag)", by J. R. V. Costa, says the exact time was actually 08:37. This last article includes the flag's designer's explanation of his intentions regarding the stars.

According to Brazil's national act number 5,700 of 1 September 1971, the flag portrays the stars as they would be seen by an imaginary observer an infinite distance above Rio de Janeiro standing outside the firmament in which the stars are meant to be placed (i.e. outside view as found on a celestial globe). Thus Beta Crucis appears to the right of the constellation and Delta Crucis to the left, in mirror image of the way they actually appear in the sky (and, coincidentally, the way they appear on the Brazilian coat of arms).

The white band with its motto appears roughly consistent with the ecliptic, as in the armillary symbol of Manuel I of Portugal and colonial Brazil, (or otherwise the celestial equator, but this interpretation is not supported by a celestial map (see figure). Some interpretations of the band also identify it with the Amazon River.

The flag of Brazil contains 27 stars, representing the Brazilian states and the Federal District. The constellation of the Southern Cross is on the meridian (indicated by the number 6 in the diagram). To the south of it is Polaris Australis (Sigma Octantis, numbered 7), representing the Federal District. Sigma Octantis, the south pole star, is small, but all the other stars turn around it; its unique position in the sky of the southern hemisphere represents the stability of the Federal District in the Brazilian union. The star Spica is the only one which is located above the white band with its motto; it symbolises the state of Pará and the part of Brazilian territory in the northern hemisphere.

The resemblance of the stars on the Brazilian flag with an actual celestial map (see figure) is only rudimentary, as the sun, moon and planets are ignored. The stars chosen for the flag are not the brightest ones which are above the horizon, and some prominent constellations containing bright stars are ignored entirely (e.g. Centaurus). The constellations shown are sometimes heavily affected by the selection of single stars (e.g. Hydra), distorted (e.g. Scorpius), or exaggerated in size (e.g. Crux, Triangulum Australe). Spica is moved to the other side of the ecliptic and thus to the other side of the equator. The resemblance with the actual sky is furthermore affected by the unusual outside view (see above). At the time and place specified as the basis for the stars, the sun was well above the horizon and Rio de Janeiro was in bright daylight, so no stars were visible. (However, at another time of the year, the stars as intended on the flag can be seen at nighttime).

==== Stars and states ====
The stars depicted on the flag and the states they represent are:

| State | Star | Constellation | Size (1=largest) | State made | Star added |
|---|---|---|---|---|---|
| Amazonas | Alpha Canis Minoris (Procyon) | Canis Minor, the Little Dog | 1 | 1889 | 1889 |
| Mato Grosso | Alpha Canis Majoris (Sirius) | Canis Major, the Great Dog | 1 | 1889 | 1889 |
| Amapá | Beta Canis Majoris (Mirzam) | Canis Major, the Great Dog | 2 | 1991 | 1992 |
| Rondônia | Gamma Canis Majoris (Muliphen) | Canis Major, the Great Dog | 4 | 1982 | 1992 |
| Roraima | Delta Canis Majoris (Wezen) | Canis Major, the Great Dog | 2 | 1991 | 1992 |
| Tocantins | Epsilon Canis Majoris (Adhara) | Canis Major, the Great Dog | 3 | 1989 | 1992 |
| Pará | Alpha Virginis (Spica) | Virgo, the Virgin | 1 | 1889 | 1889 |
| Piauí | Alpha Scorpii (Antares) | Scorpius, the Scorpion | 1 | 1889 | 1889 |
| Maranhão | Beta Scorpii (Acrab) | Scorpius, the Scorpion | 3 | 1889 | 1889 |
| Ceará | Epsilon Scorpii (Larawag) | Scorpius, the Scorpion | 2 | 1889 | 1889 |
| Alagoas | Theta Scorpii (Sargas) | Scorpius, the Scorpion | 2 | 1889 | 1889 |
| Sergipe | Iota Scorpii | Scorpius, the Scorpion | 3 | 1889 | 1889 |
| Paraíba | Kappa Scorpii | Scorpius, the Scorpion | 3 | 1889 | 1889 |
| Rio Grande do Norte | Lambda Scorpii (Shaula) | Scorpius, the Scorpion | 2 | 1889 | 1889 |
| Pernambuco | Mu Scorpii (Xamidimura & Pipirima) | Scorpius, the Scorpion | 3 | 1889 | 1889 |
| Mato Grosso do Sul | Alpha Hydrae (Alphard) | Hydra, the Water Serpent | 2 | 1979 (Note: Brazil's original Federal District was created in 1889 from the former Neutral Municipality covering the then-capital city of Rio de Janeiro, and represented on the flag by the star Sigma Octantis (Polaris Australis). In 1960, to correspond with the creation of the new capital, Brasília, the Federal District was reconstituted on new territory carved out of the state of Goiás, bordering the Minas Gerais state; it continued to be represented on the flag by Sigma Octantis. The former Federal District became the new state of Guanabara and a new star, Alphard, was added to the flag to represent it. Guanabara was eliminated as a separate state in 1975; however, Alphard was not removed from the flag and from 1975 to 1979 it represented no state. When the new state of Mato Grosso do Sul was created in 1979, it was assigned Alphard.) | 1960 |
| Acre | Gamma Hydrae (Naga) | Hydra, the Water Serpent | 3 | 1962 | 1968 |
| São Paulo | Alpha Crucis (Acrux or Estrela de Magalhães) | Crux, the Southern Cross | 1 | 1889 | 1889 |
| Rio de Janeiro | Beta Crucis (Mimosa) | Crux, the Southern Cross | 2 | 1889 | 1889 |
| Bahia | Gamma Crucis (Gacrux) | Crux, the Southern Cross | 2 | 1889 | 1889 |
| Minas Gerais | Delta Crucis (Imai) | Crux, the Southern Cross | 3 | 1889 | 1889 |
| Espírito Santo | Epsilon Crucis (Ginan) | Crux, the Southern Cross | 4 | 1889 | 1889 |
| Rio Grande do Sul | Alpha Trianguli Australis (Atria) | Triangulum Australe, the Southern Triangle | 2 | 1889 | 1889 |
| Santa Catarina | Beta Trianguli Australis | Triangulum Australe, the Southern Triangle | 3 | 1889 | 1889 |
| Paraná | Gamma Trianguli Australis | Triangulum Australe, the Southern Triangle | 3 | 1889 | 1889 |
| Goiás | Alpha Carinae (Canopus) | Carina, the Keel of Argo | 1 | 1889 | 1889 |
| Distrito Federal | Sigma Octantis (Polaris Australis) | Octans, the Octant | 5 | 1889 | 1889 |

==== Colours ====
The specific shades of colors used in the flag are not specified in any legal document. The values listed below can be found in the files available for download from the Brazilian government website:

| | Green | Yellow | Blue | White |
|---|---|---|---|---|
| RGB | 0/148/64 | 255/203/0 | 48/38/129 | 255/255/255 |
| Hexadecimal | #009440 | #ffcb00 | #302681 | #ffffff |
| CMYK | 84/12/96/1 | 0/21/93/0 | 100/97/10/1 | 0/0/0/0 |

=== Proposed design alterations ===
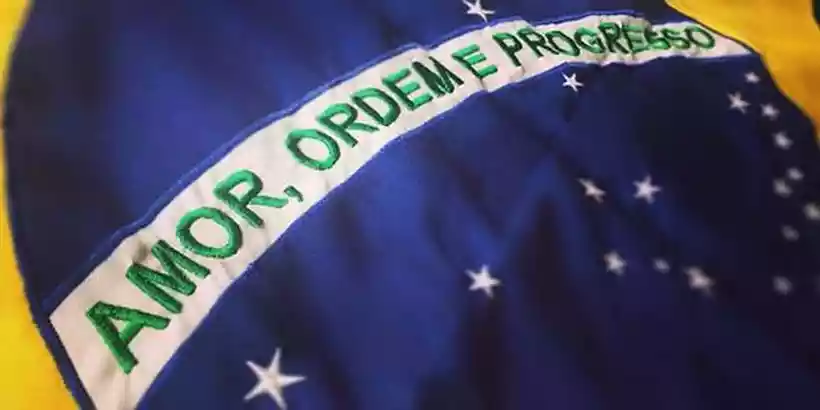
Proposed design alteration for the flag, with the added word "Amor"

In 2021, the movement "Amor na Bandeira" (in English, Love in the Flag) proposed to update the flag's motto from "Ordem e Progresso" to "Amor, Ordem e Progresso" (Love, Order and Progress), in allusion to the motto of positivism "L'amour pour principe et l'ordre pour base; le progrès pour but" (Love as a principle and order as the basis; progress as the goal), formulated by the French philosopher Auguste Comte, which inspired the original motto in the flag. One of the main proponents of the movement was the politician Eduardo Suplicy, who had previously supported bill PL 2179/2003 by Deputy Chico Alencar, which had the same goal. That 2003 bill also aimed to change the expression on the Brazilian flag to Love, Order and Progress.

== Flag protocol ==
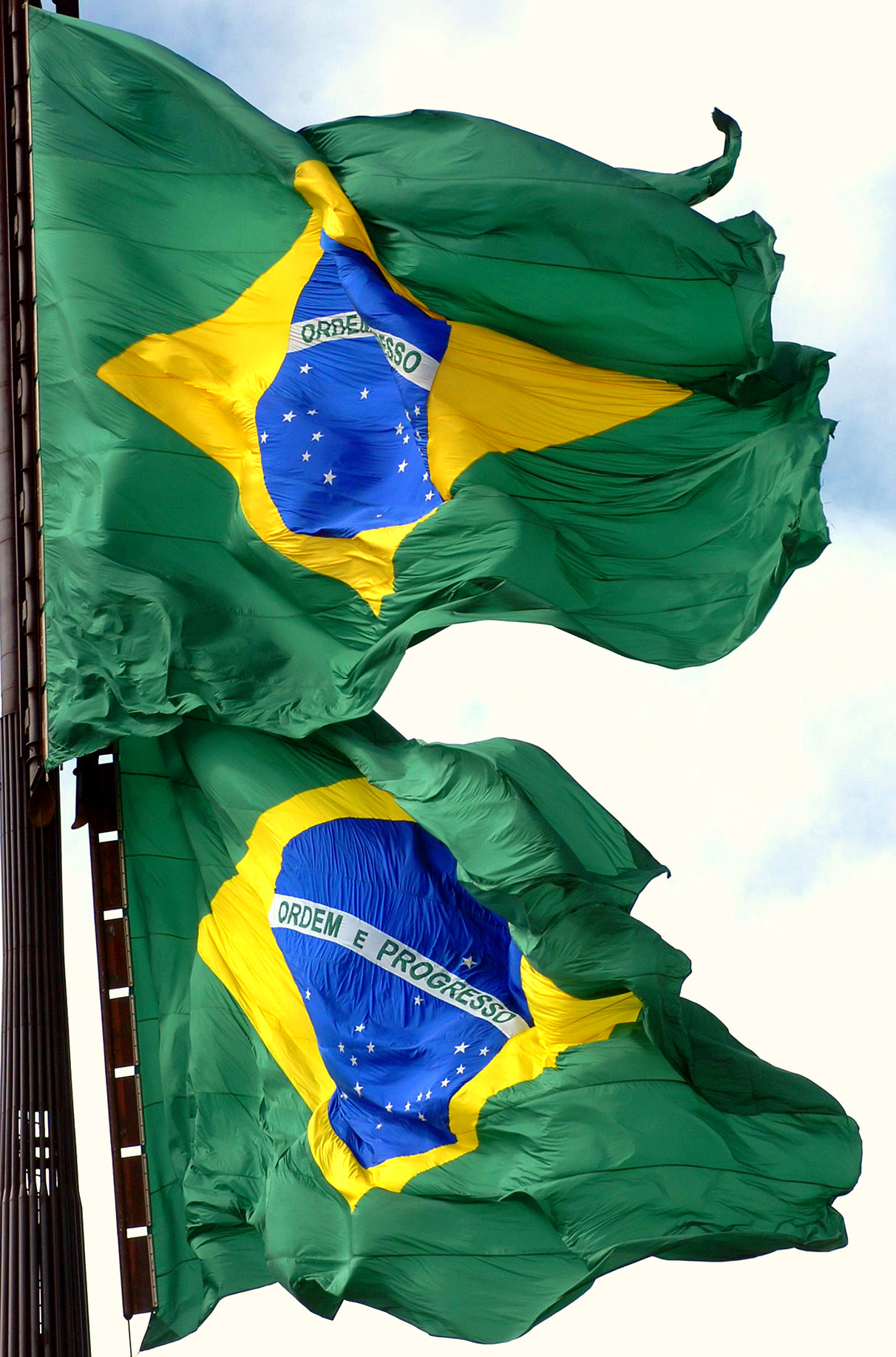
The flag being replaced in a monthly ceremony held at the Praça dos Três Poderes (Three Powers Plaza) in Brasília

Federal Law No. 5,700, issued on 1 September 1971, defines the flag protocol in Brazil. The flag must be permanently hoisted at the Praça dos Três Poderes in Brasília. The flag must be raised and lowered daily at the presidential palaces (Palácio do Planalto and Palácio da Alvorada); ministries; National Congress; Supreme Federal Tribunal; Supreme Court of Justice; seats of the Executive, Legislative and Judicial branches; diplomatic missions; Federal, state and local institutions; and merchant navy units. When a flag is no longer fit to use, it must be delivered to a military facility to be burned during a special ceremony on 19 November ("Flag Day").

The flag must be flown at half-staff when the President decrees official mourning. In addition, state and local governments may decree official mourning with the death of a mayor or governor. When the flag is displayed at half-staff, prior to raising or lowering it, the flag must be raised to the top of the flagpole and then lowered to the halfway mark. When the flag is being carried in procession, a black crape ribbon must be tied to the top of the mast.

A foreign flag may only be flown with a Brazilian Flag along its right side. The only exceptions are when the foreign flag is displayed in an embassy or consulate and in prize-giving ceremonies of sport competitions won by foreign athletes. When multiple flags are raised or lowered simultaneously, the Brazilian Flag must be the first to reach the top of the flagpole and the last to reach the bottom.

=== Folding ===
| Stage | Description | Example |
|---|---|---|
| First | The upper half of the flag's height is folded into the reverse side. | |
| Second | The folding proceeds by folding the flag's lower half into the reverse side until most of the blue disc and the motto face up. | |
| Third | The flag is then folded into three parts along the width axis, with the fly and hoist folded into the reverse side, leaving the blue disc and motto facing up. | |

=== Flag anthem ===
Vocal
Brazilian Flag Anthem performed by choir for the Ministry of Education.

Vocal
Brazilian Flag Anthem performed by the Brazilian Army choir.

The Brazilian Flag Anthem (Hino à Bandeira Nacional) is a song dedicated to the country's flag. It is performed on 19 November (Flag Day). The Portuguese lyrics were written by poet Olavo Bilac, and the music composed by Francisco Braga.

Portuguese lyrics

Salve, lindo pendão da esperança!
Salve, símbolo augusto da paz!
Tua nobre presença à lembrança
A grandeza da Pátria nos traz.

Chorus
Recebe o afeto que se encerra
Em nosso peito juvenil,
Querido símbolo da terra,
Da amada terra do Brasil!

Em teu seio formoso retratas
Este céu de puríssimo azul,
A verdura sem par destas matas,
E o esplendor do Cruzeiro do Sul.
(Chorus)

Contemplando o teu vulto sagrado,
Compreendemos o nosso dever,
E o Brasil por seus filhos amado,
Poderoso e feliz há de ser!
(Chorus)

Sobre a imensa nação brasileira,
Nos momentos de festa ou de dor,
Paira sempre, sagrada bandeira,
Pavilhão da justiça e do amor!
(Chorus)

English translation

Hail, precious banner of hope!
Hail, august symbol of peace!
Thy noble presence to our minds
The greatness of our motherland does bring.

Chorus
Take the affection enclosed
In our youthful chest,
Dear symbol of the land,
Of the beloved land of Brazil!

In thy beauteous bosom thou portrayest
This sky of purest blue,
The peerless greenness of these forests,
And the splendor of the Southern Cross.
(Chorus)

Beholding thy sacred shadow,
We understand our duty,
And Brazil, loved by its children,
Powerful and happy shall be!
(Chorus)

Over the immense Brazilian Nation,
In times of happiness or grief,
Hover always, o sacred flag,
Pavilion of justice and love!
(Chorus)

== Other flags ==
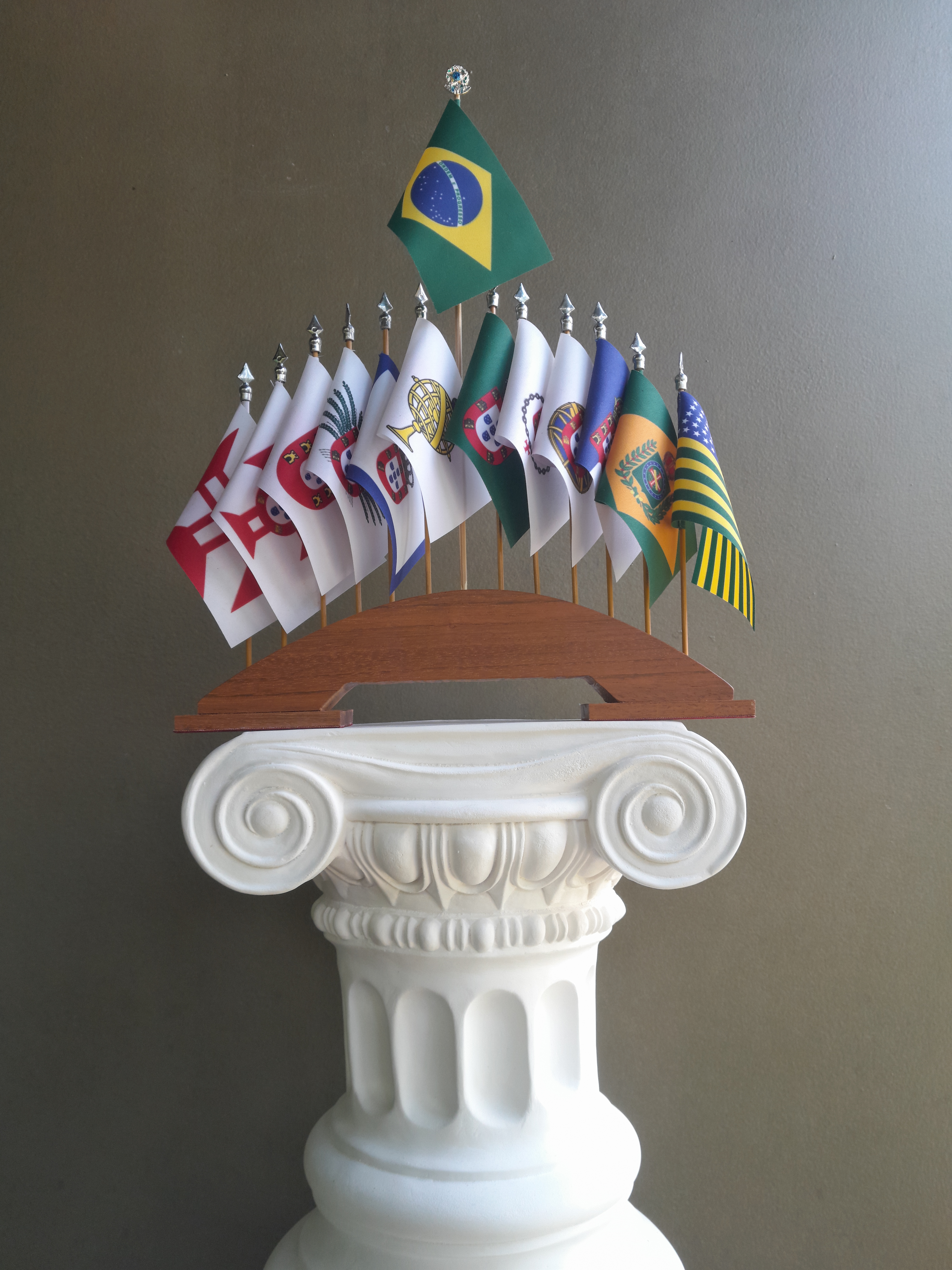
Historical flags (1500–present-day)

=== Governmental flags ===
The president and vice president are also represented by their own flag. The President Standard is a dark green rectangle (ratio 2:3) holding the national coat of arms on its center. It is usually hoisted at the President's official residence, the Palácio da Alvorada, and at the President's workplace, the Palácio do Planalto. It is also displayed on the presidential car, as small-sized flags. The Vice Presidential Standard is a yellow rectangle (ratio 2:3) with twenty-three blue stars disposed in a cross dividing the flag into four equal quadrants, with the coat of arms in the middle of the upper left quadrant.

Presidential Standard

Vice Presidential Standard

Flag of the Minister of Defence

==== Military flags ====
Some of the branches of the Brazilian military also have their own flags.

Brazilian Army (since 1987)

Brazilian Air Force (de facto flag, since 1999)

Brazilian Navy flag

Brazilian air force general flag

Brazilian naval admiral flag

Flag-insignia of the chief of the Joint Chiefs of Staff of the Brazilian Armed Forces.

===== Naval jack =====
The Brazilian naval jack (jaque) is a rectangular flag (ratio 3:4) bearing 21 white stars on a dark blue field – a horizontal row of 13 and a vertical column of 9, orthogonally displayed.

Naval jack

=== Previous flags ===
The list below identifies previous flags used in Brazil.

Flag of the United Kingdom of Portugal, Brazil and the Algarves (1816–1822)

Flag of the Brazilian Kingdom (18 September – 1 December 1822)

Flag of the Empire of Brazil, first version (1 December 1822 – 29 August 1853)

Flag of the Empire of Brazil, second version (30 August 1853 – 15 November 1889)

Provisional Flag of Republic of the United States of Brazil (15 – 19 November 1889)

First Flag of the United States of Brazil (19 November 1889 – present)

=== Rejected flags ===
The best-known rejected flags are listed below. Several designs use the green and yellow of the imperial flag. A black-white-red pattern was also proposed, representing the major ethnic groups of Brazil: red for Native Brazilians, white for Brazilians of European or Levantine descent, and black for Afro-Brazilians.

Design by Lopes Trovão, 1888. It was raised when the Republic was founded, then replaced with the similar design by Ruy Barbosa.

Design by Júlio Ribeiro, 1888. This design later became the basis for the current flag of the state of São Paulo.

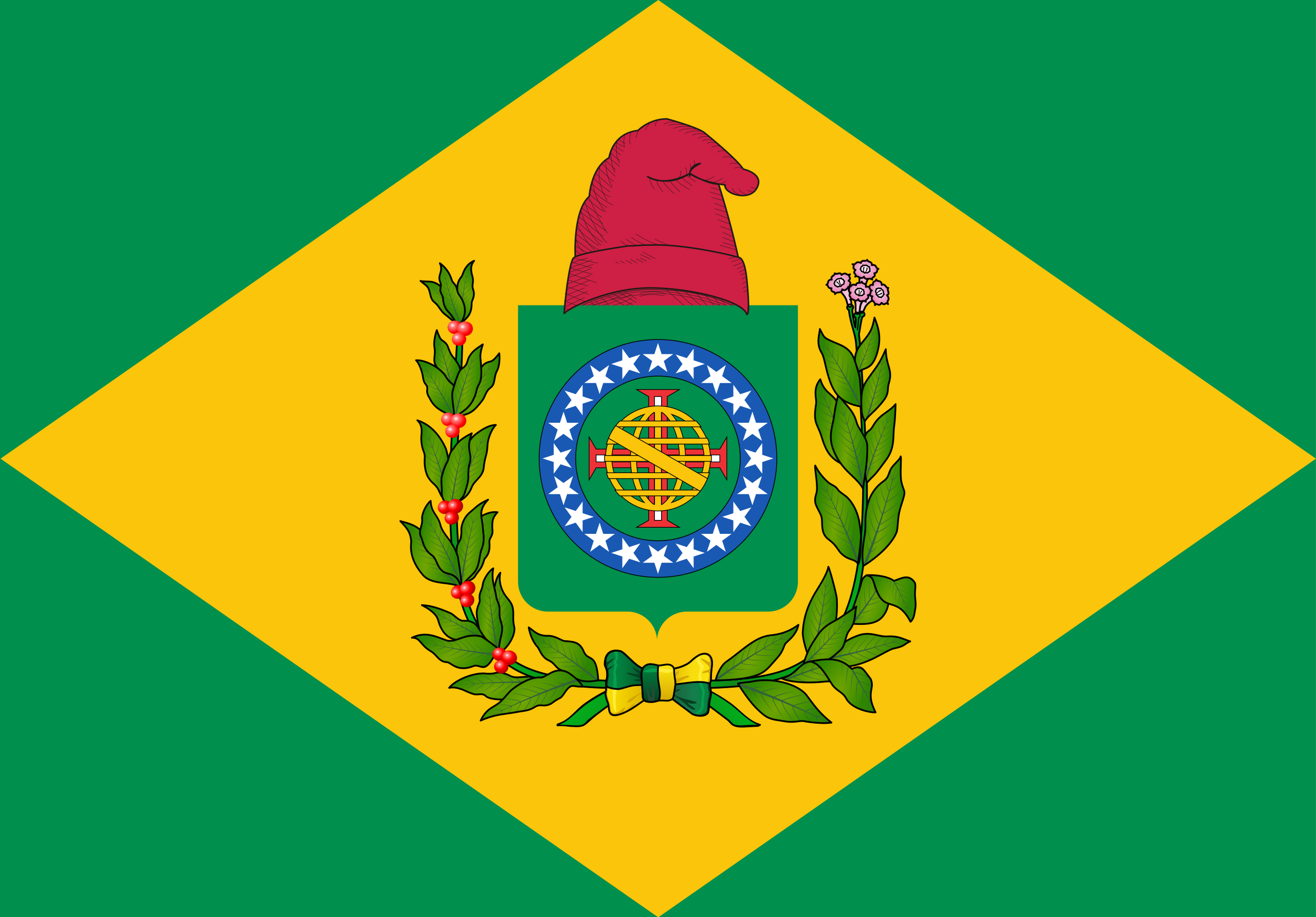
Design by Deodoro da Fonseca, 1889.

Design by Antônio da Silva Jardim, 1890.

Design by José Maria da Silva Paranhos, Jr., 1890.

Design by Oliveira Valadão, 1892.

Design by Eurico de Góis, 1908.

Design by Wenceslau Escobar, 1908.

Second design by Eurico de Góis, 1933.

== See also ==
- List of Brazilian flags
