= Pedro Paulo Bruno =

Pedro Bruno
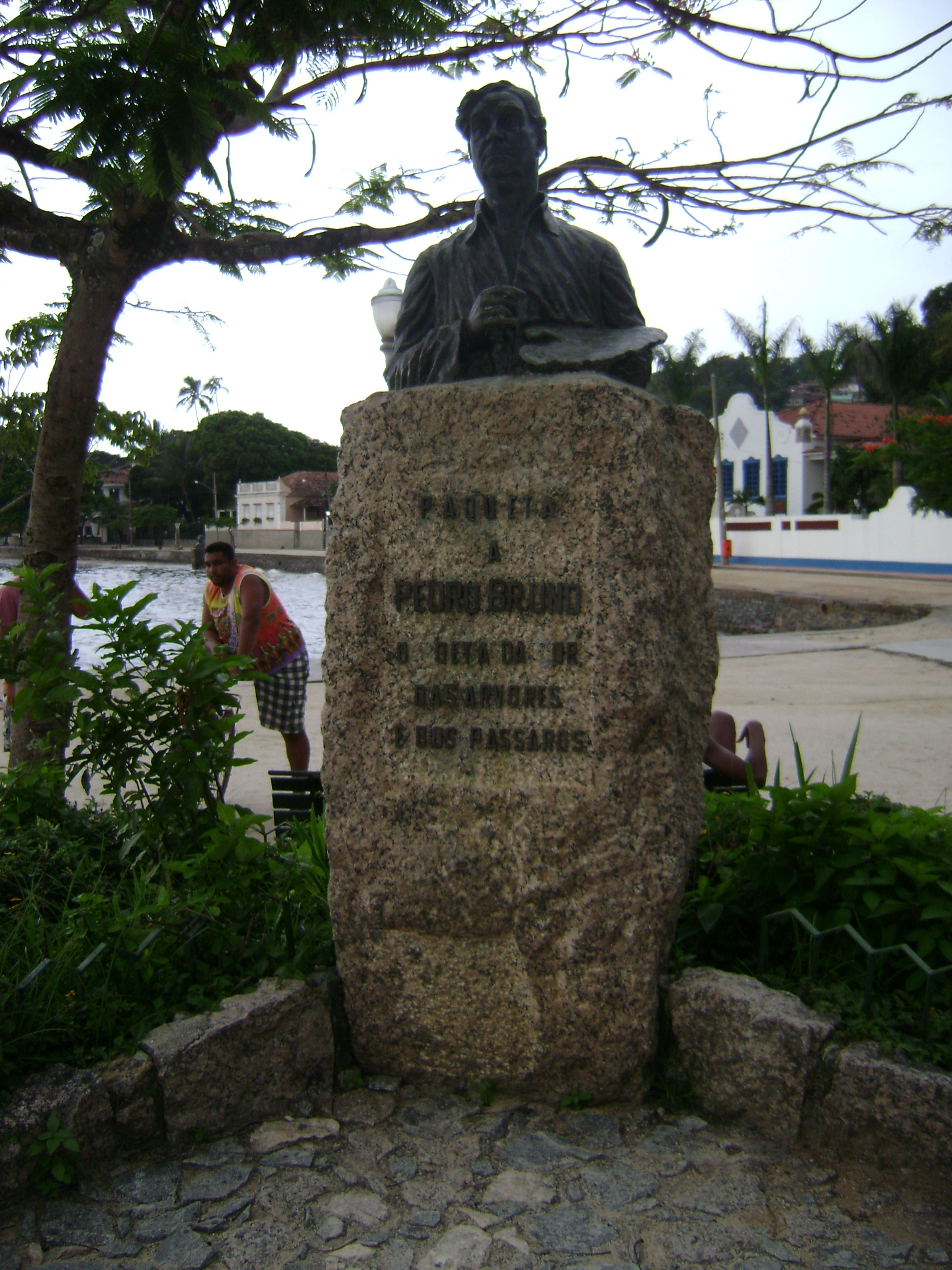
- Statue of Pedro Bruno at Paquetá Island.
- Born: Pedro Paulo Bruno; October 14, 1888; Paquetá Island, Rio de Janeiro
- Died: February 2, 1949 (aged 60); Rio de Janeiro, Rio de Janeiro
- Known for: Painting, sculpture, landscaping, singing, writing
- Website: PintorPedroBruno.com.br

Pedro Paulo Bruno (October 14, 1888 – February 2, 1949) was a Brazilian painter, singer, poet, and landscaper of Italian origin. His best known work is the 1918 painting Pátria (Fatherland), which depicts the Brazilian flag being embroidered by a family.

He is the Founder of the 13th chair of the Brazilian Academy of Fine Arts.

== Biography ==
Pedro Paulo Bruno was born on October 14, 1888, at his family home on the Paquetá Island. His father was the Italian merchant Felice Antonio Bruno, which had emigrated to Brazil with his young wife Magdalena Marmo Bruno in 1878, along with their three children (Rosa, Antero, and Miguel). Originally from Casalbuono, in the province of Salerno, they settled in the island of Paquetá, in a house at 105 Praia da Guarda.

At age 7, Bruno made his first sketches, and at 9 was already recognized in Paquetá as a promising painter. At that time, upon the death of a child whose parents wanted to have his portrait, Bruno was hastily summoned and right there at the funeral, although a little scared, drew the picture. In 1897, when painter Giovanni Battista Castagneto, also of Italian origin, was visiting Paquetá, Bruno immediately became friends with him, offering to carry his easel, palette and brushes for the different parts of the island that the artist was portraying. The boy spent hours watching closely the work of the master and became a dedicated disciple.

Bruno was also a talented singer, with a baritone voice. In 1905, at age 14, he embarked to Italy to study at the Conservatories of Naples and of Rome, from where he returned graduated in bel canto. He worked at the Conservatory of Rio de Janeiro, and, under the direction of maestro De Lucio, toured to Belo Horizonte, São Paulo and Santos.
