= Teixeira Mendes =

Brazilian philosopher and mathematician

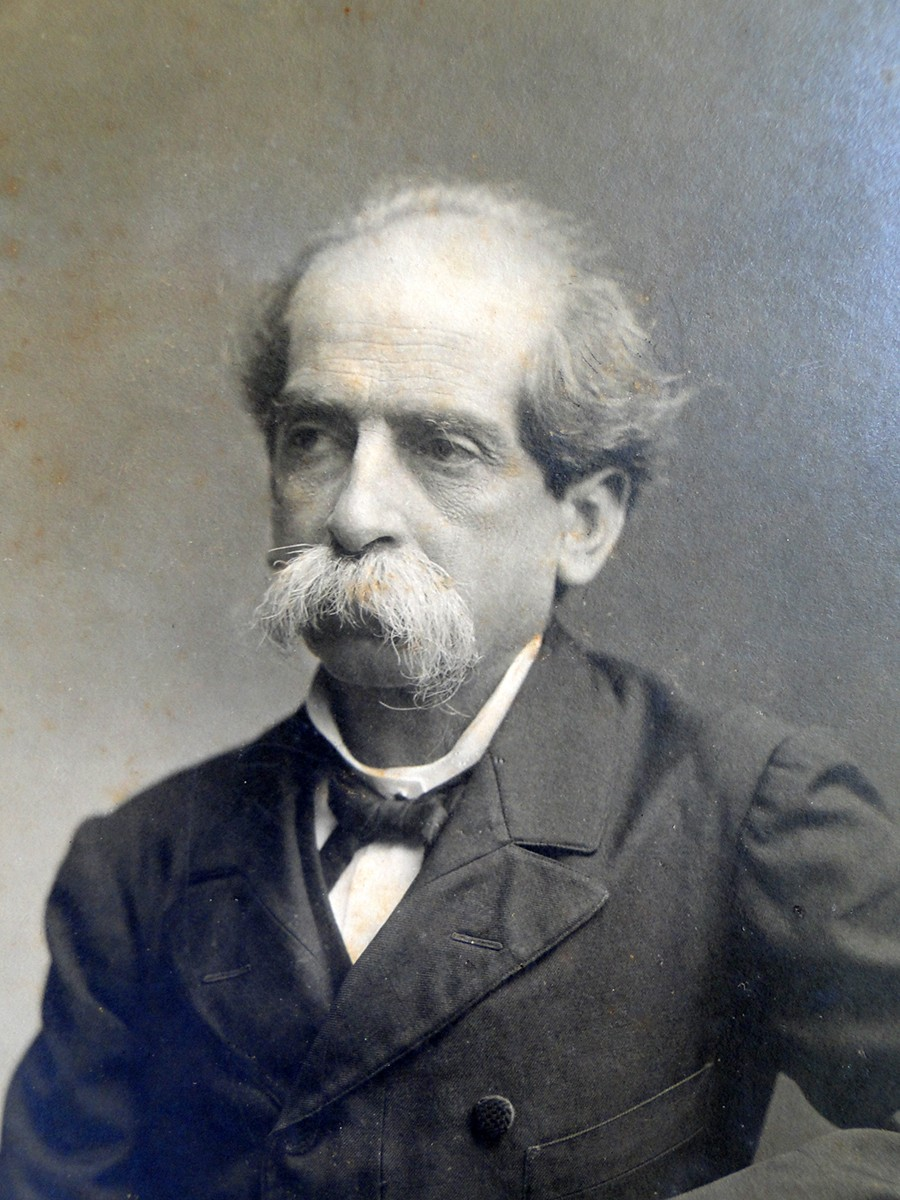
Teixeira Mendes

Raimundo Teixeira Mendes (5 January 1855 – 28 June 1927) was a Brazilian philosopher and mathematician. He is credited with creating the national motto, "Order and Progress", as well as the national flag on which it appears.

Teixeira Mendes was born in Caxias, Maranhão.

== Comtean Positivism ==
Teixeira Mendes was heavily influenced by Comtism and is classed as a "Humanity Apostle" by Brazil's Religion of Humanity, which is called "Igreja Positivista do Brasil" or in English "Positivist Church of Brazil." In life he led the Positivist Church after 1903. For him the Positivist viewpoint meant he opposed most wars and believed in the eventual disappearance of nations. He also opposed Christian missionary work toward the indigenous Brazilians and instead favored a policy based on protection and gradual assimilation. He deemed their societies "fetishistic", but believed a gradual non-coercive assimilation was the way to turn them into Positivists.

He died in Rio de Janeiro, aged 72.
