= Palazzo Pubblico Clock Tower =

Sammarinese Pseudo-Fortification and clock tower

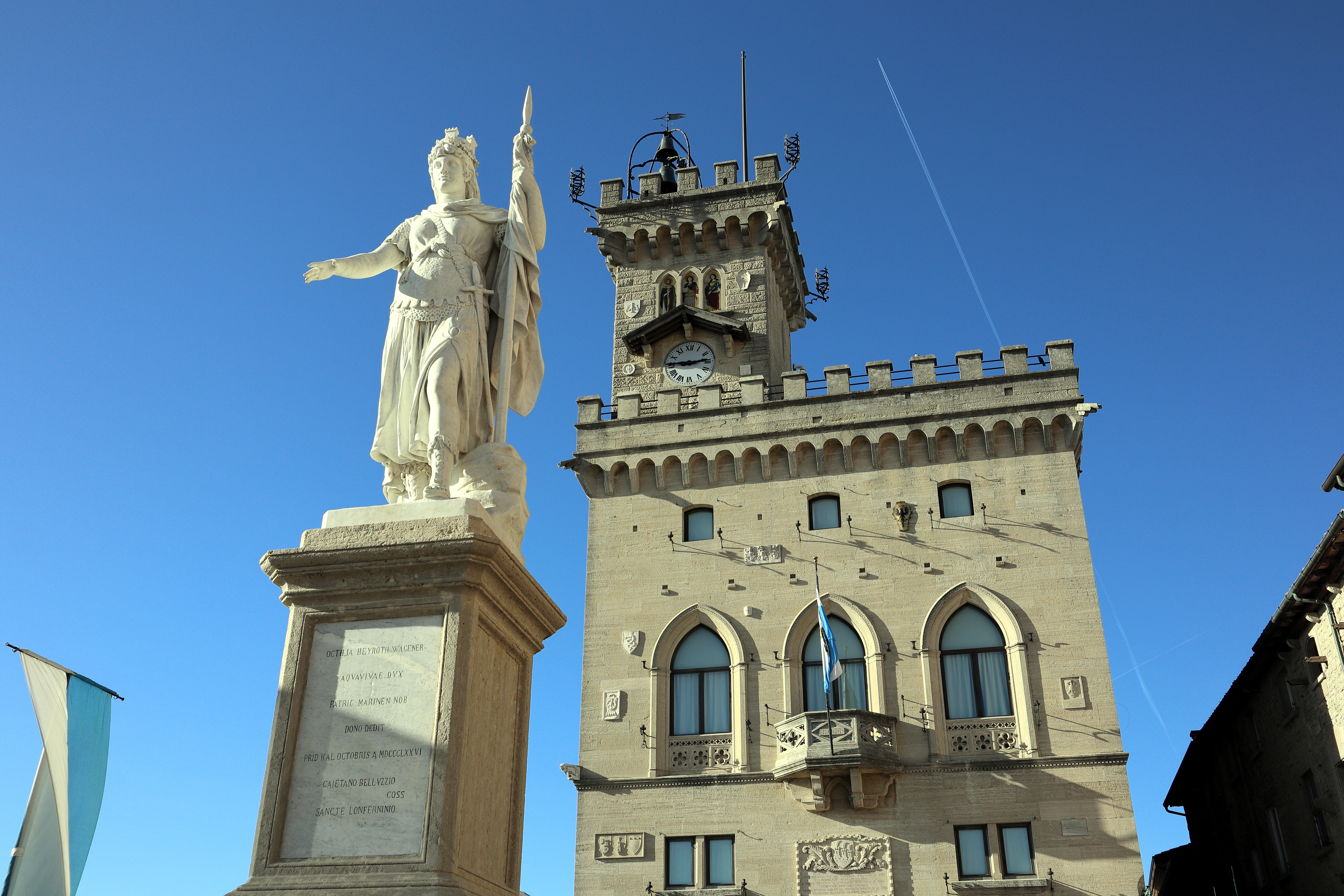
The clock tower.

The Palazzo Pubblico (English: Public Palace) Clock Tower is a 19th Century Sammarinese pseudo-fortification that is located on the roof of the Palazzo Pubblico, which is the Sammarinese seat of power. The structure was built between May 17, 1884, and Sept. 30, 1894, and was built to resemble a fortification to commemorate San Marino's fortified past, especially the three towers which are its national symbol.

== Description ==
The 3 mosaics depicting Saints Leo, Agatha, and Marinus are right above the small roof over the clock face.

In three mosaics on the clocktower façade, are depicted Saints Leo, Agatha, and Marinus, all patron saints of the Republic. The whole building was designed by Francesco Azzurri, a notable architect from Rome. The building was made from local sandstone, and used local labor to construct the building, while foreign stone workers were brought in to do the finer work. Azzurri constructed the clock tower like many town halls from the 13th and 14th Centuries, which usually had clocks. The perimeter of the roof and clock tower was lined with battlements (also known as “High and Lows” or crenellations). Around the roof of the clock tower were more battlements. The clock in the tower has one face, which dates from 1893. On each corner of the roof, battlements were wrought iron braziers meant to make the building look like something out of the Middle Ages. When the building was finished, representatives from as far away as Paris and Vienna came to celebrate its completion and inauguration. The bells inside and on top of the tower are only rung during special occasions or in times of war. The bell has not been rung often since it was severely cracked in 1831, which gives the bell a muffled sound. The bell starts and ends the Palio di Siena horse race, and commemorates the city's liberation on July 3, 1944, during World War II. It also rings on election day and the end of the academic school year.

== Renovations ==
In 1994, the 100 years anniversary of the clocktower opening, the building was remodeled. The weathered stone of the facade was replaced with newer stones to make the building seem less old. The machinery inside the clock was also repaired and replaced. Minor conservative restoration on the three mosaics on the facade was also done. The renovations were finished on Sept. 29, 1996.

== See also ==
- San Francesco Gate (San Marino)
- Three Towers of San Marino
- Palazzo Pubblico (San Marino)
