= City of San Marino =

City of San Marino Città di San Marino
- Capital city and Castello
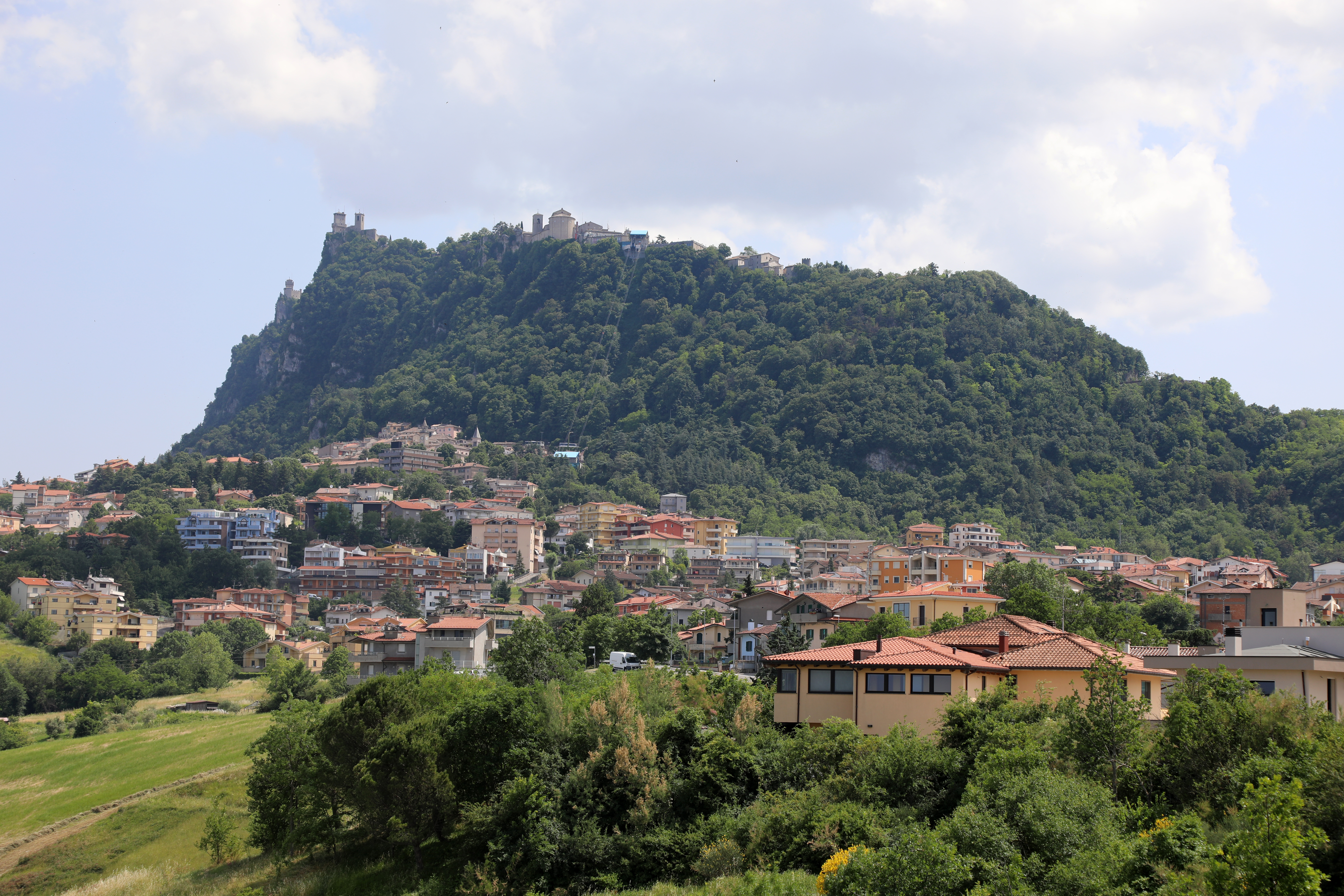
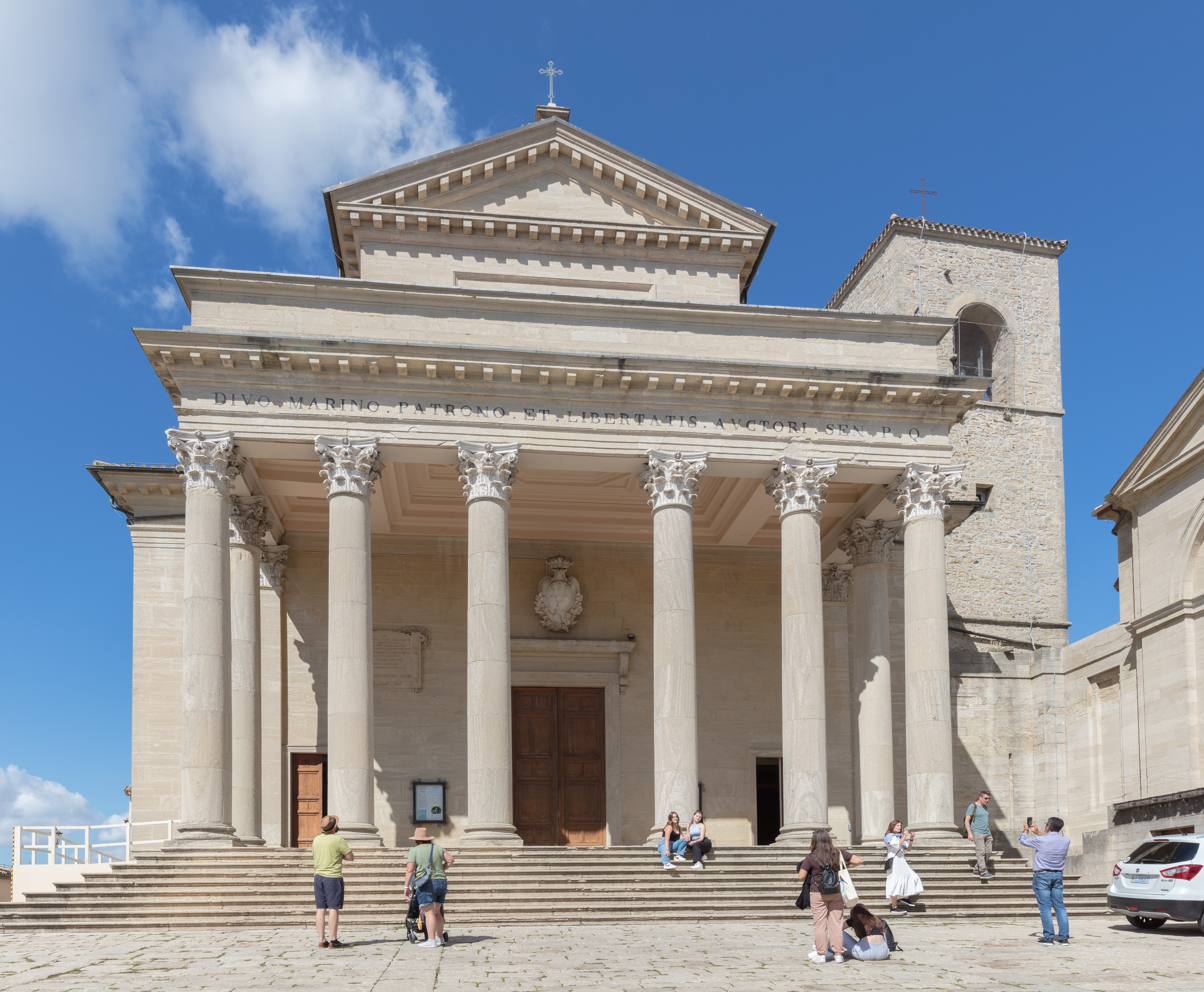
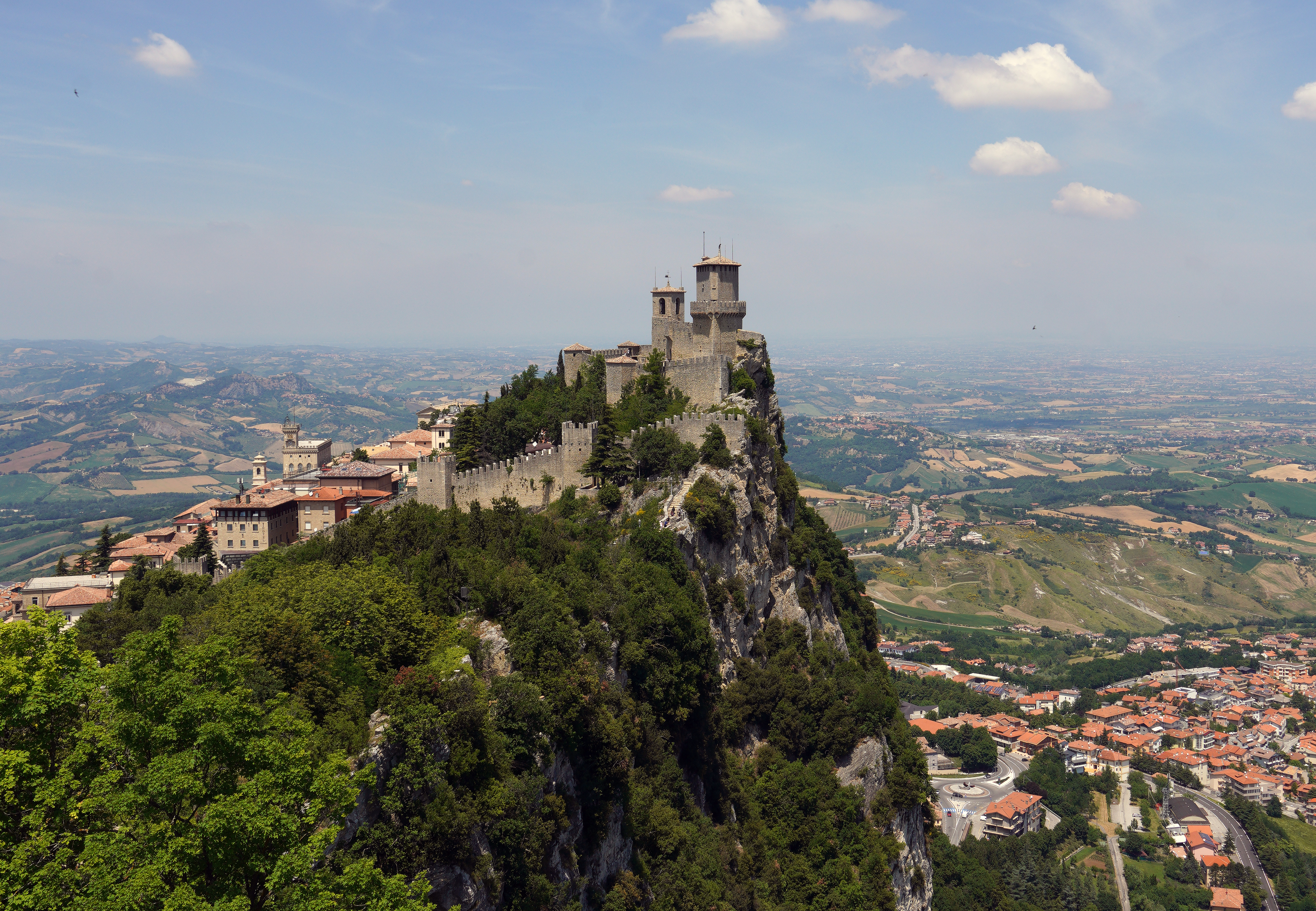
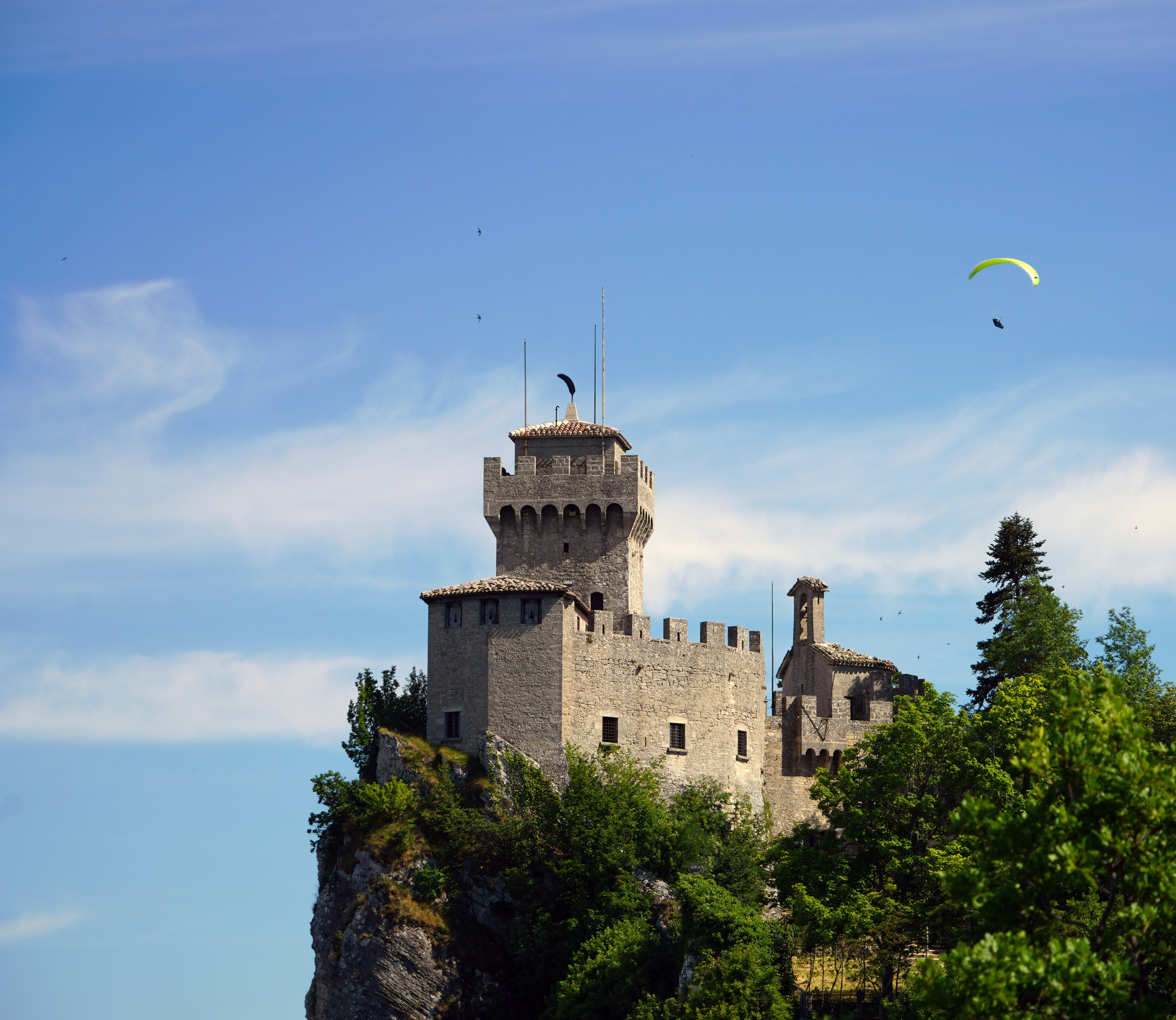
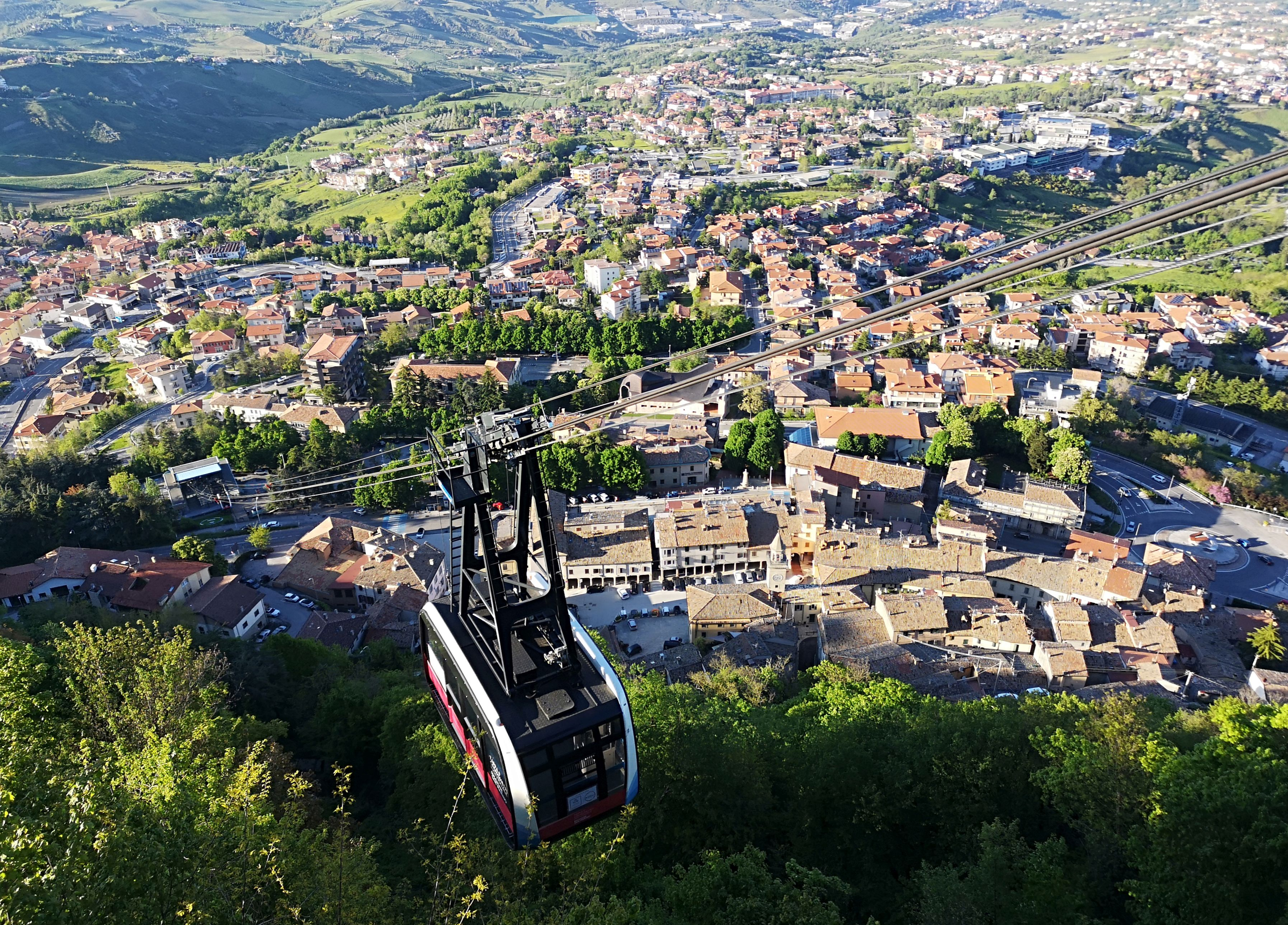
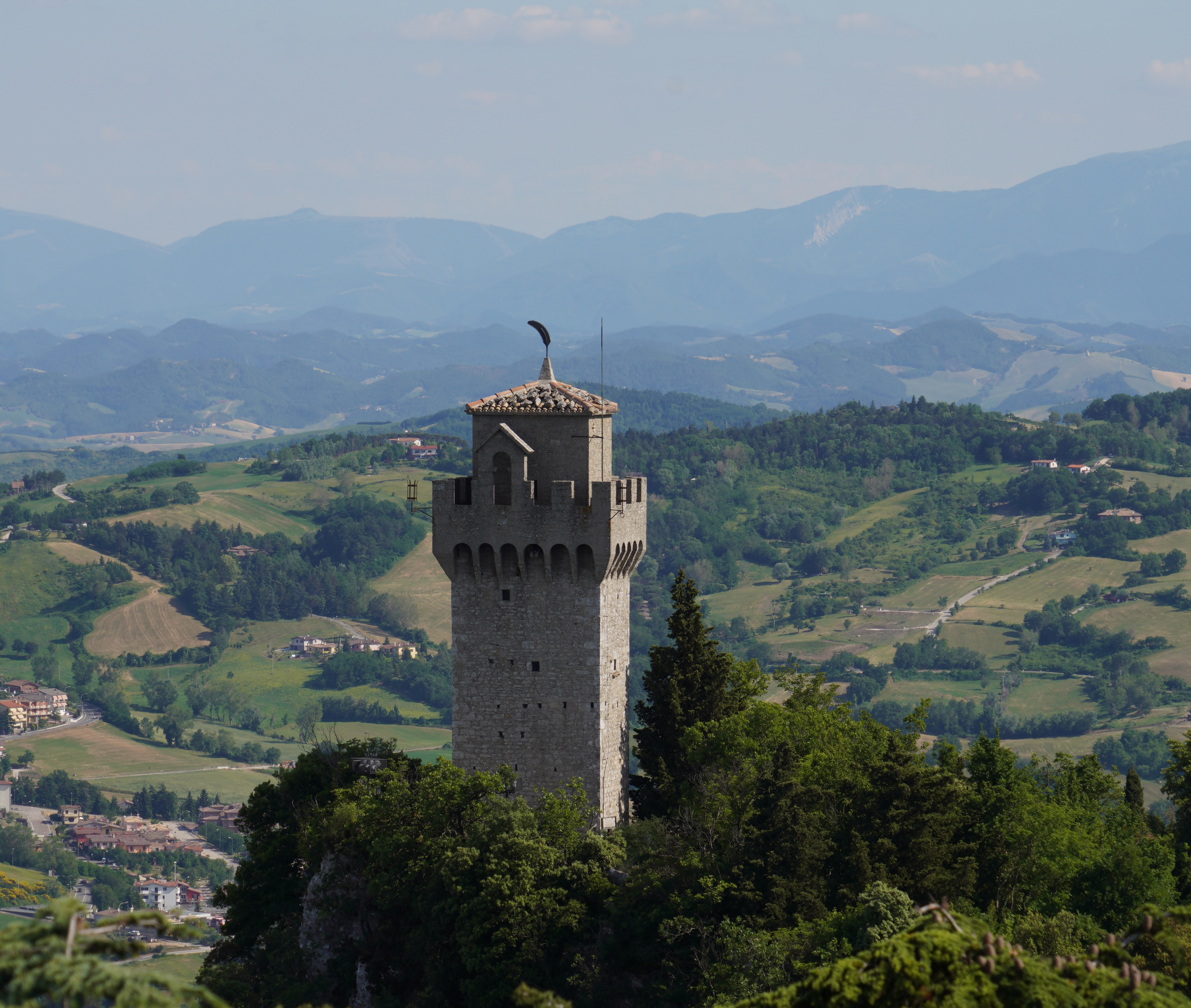
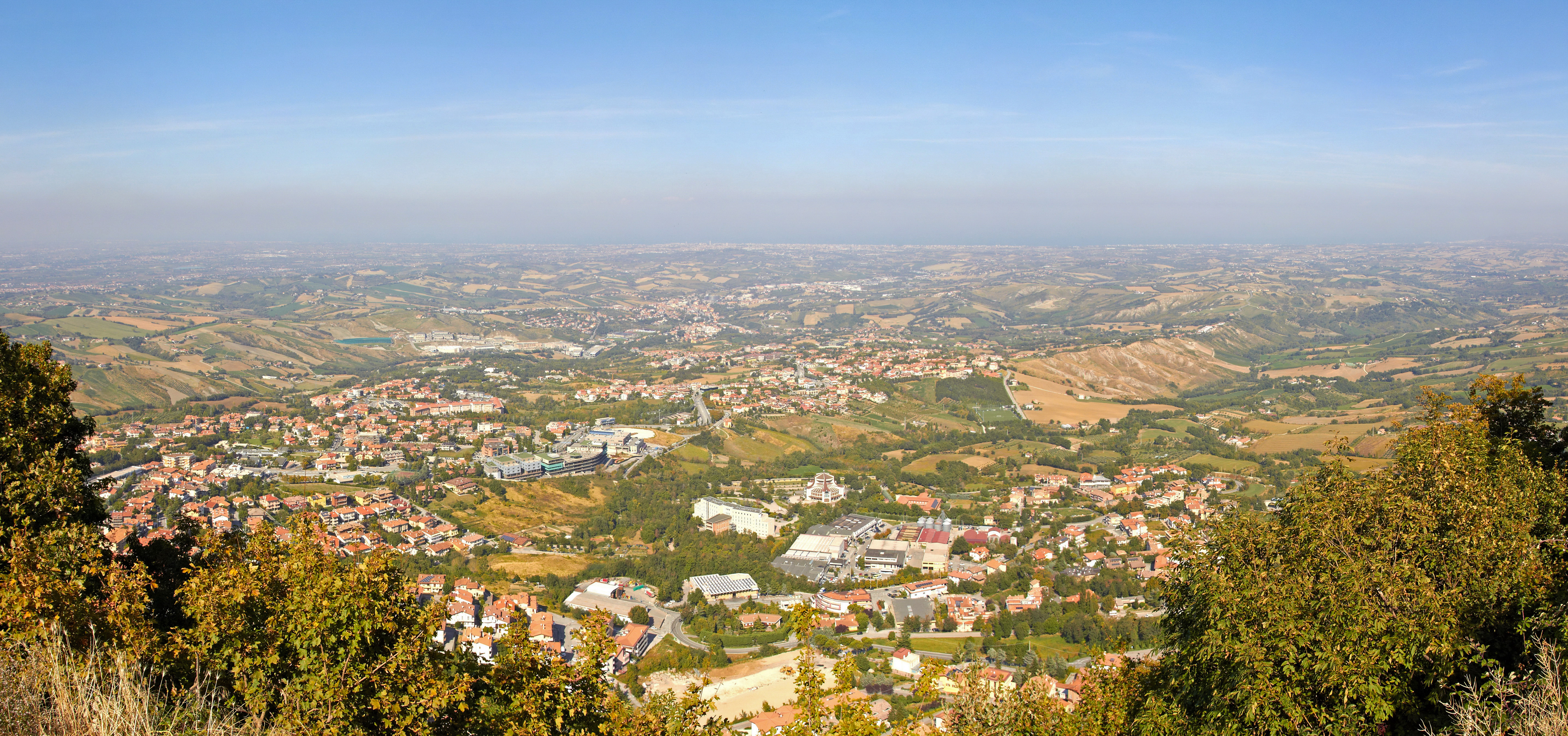
- Clockwise from top: view of Monte Titano, Basilica di San Marino, De La Fratta Tower, Montale tower, panorama from the top, the aerial cable car, Guaita Tower, Palazzo Pubblico

- Flag Coat of arms

- San Marino's location in San Marino

- Location within San Marino Location within Europe
- Coordinates: 43°56′4.56″N 12°26′50.28″E
- Country: San Marino
- Foundation: 3 September 301 (traditional date)
- Curazie: List: Cà Berlone, Canepa, Casole, Castellaro, Montalbo, Murata, Santa Mustiola

Government
  - Capitano: Cristina Felici (Insieme per San Marino/PDCS; since 2025)

Area
  - Total: 7.09 km^{2} (2.74 sq mi)
- Elevation: 749 m (2,457 ft)

Population (2026)
  - Total: 4,130
  - Density: 582.23/km^{2} (1,508.0/sq mi)
- Time zone: UTC+1 (CET)
  - Summer (DST): UTC+2 (CEST)
- Postal code: RSM-47890
- Climate: Cfb
- Website: City of San Marino

San Marino Historic Centre and Mount Titano
UNESCO World Heritage Site
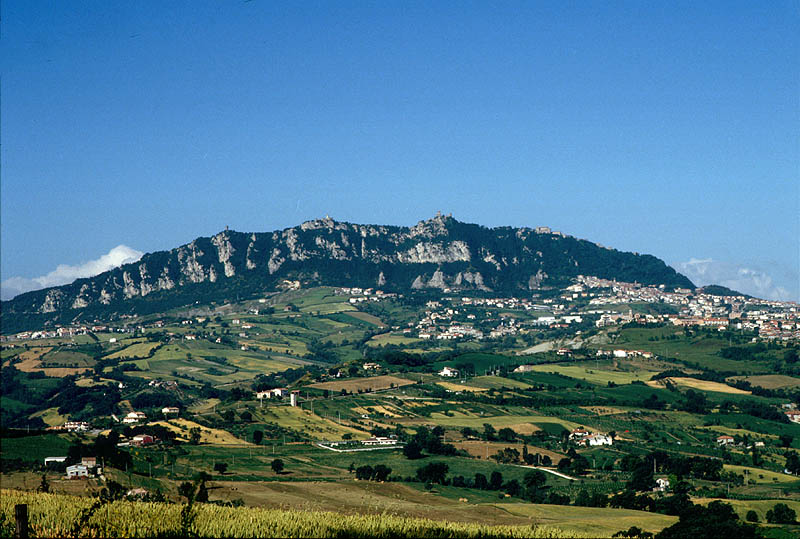
- Monte Titano and three fortresses on top of it can be seen from many kilometers away
- Interactive map of San Marino Historic Centre and Mount Titano
- Criteria: Cultural: iii
- Reference: 1245
- Inscription: 2008 (32nd Session)
- Area: 55 ha (140 acres)
- Buffer zone: 167 ha (410 acres)

The City of San Marino (Italian: Città di San Marino), also known simply as San Marino and locally as Città, is the capital city of the Republic of San Marino and one of its nine castelli. It has a population of 4,118. It is on the western slopes of San Marino's highest point, Monte Titano. It is also the fifth-least-populated national capital in the world.

== Geography ==
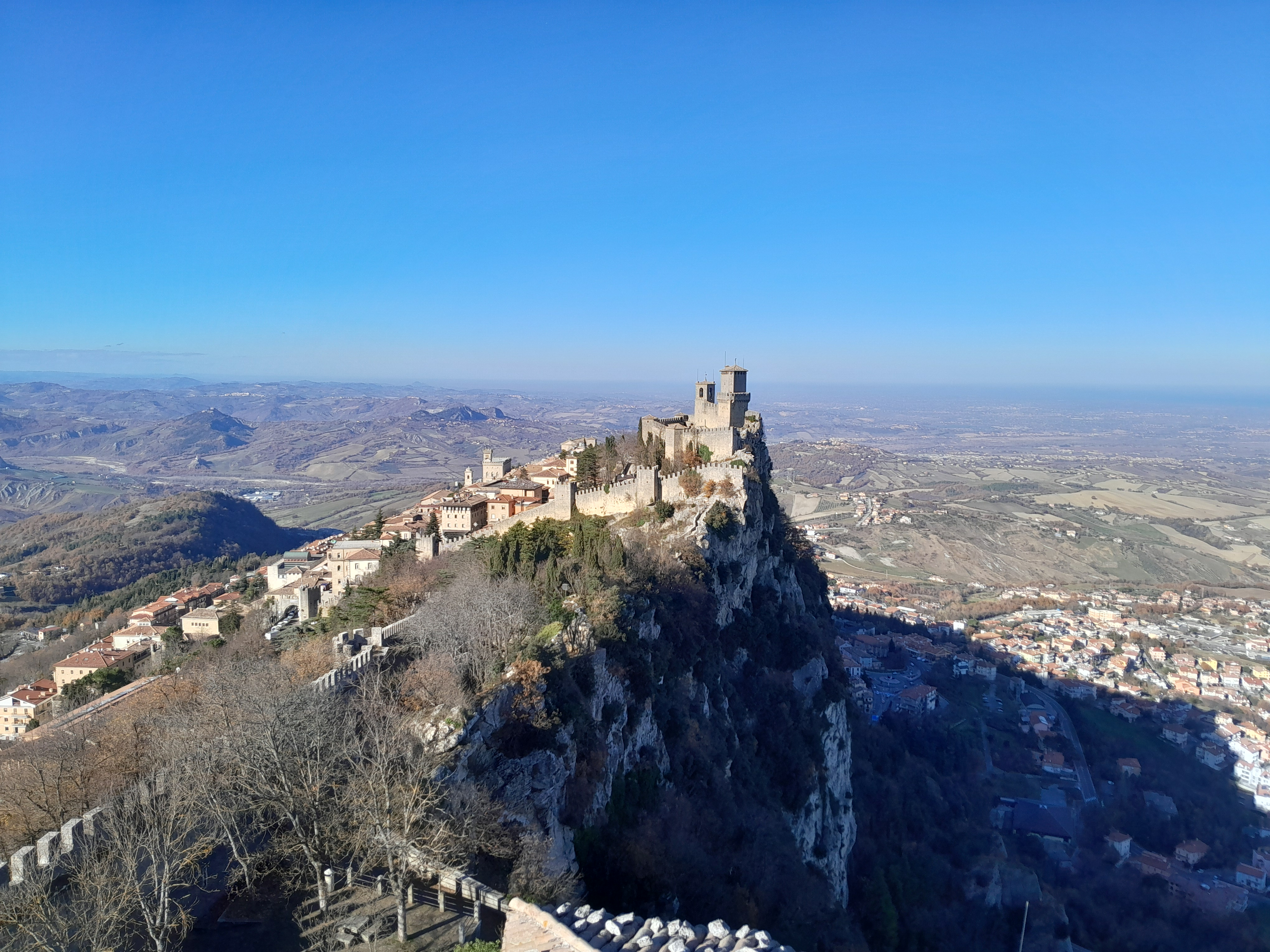
View of main tower Guaita, from Cesta Tower

The City of San Marino borders the castelli of Acquaviva, Borgo Maggiore, Fiorentino, and Chiesanuova and the Italian municipality of San Leo.

The City of San Marino contains seven curazie: Cà Berlone, Canepa, Casole, Castellaro, Montalbo, Murata, and Santa Mustiola.

The International Academy of Sciences San Marino was centered here.

=== Climate ===
City of San Marino has a humid subtropical climate (Köppen: Cfa).

Climate data for City of San Marino
Month	Jan	Feb	Mar	Apr	May	Jun	Jul	Aug	Sep	Oct	Nov	Dec	Year
Mean daily maximum °C (°F)	8.7 (47.7)	10.0 (50.0)	13.0 (55.4)	16.4 (61.5)	21.0 (69.8)	25.9 (78.6)	28.5 (83.3)	28.2 (82.8)	23.6 (74.5)	19.2 (66.6)	14.0 (57.2)	9.9 (49.8)	18.2 (64.8)
Daily mean °C (°F)	6.0 (42.8)	6.9 (44.4)	9.8 (49.6)	13.1 (55.6)	17.7 (63.9)	22.4 (72.3)	24.9 (76.8)	24.4 (75.9)	20.1 (68.2)	16.0 (60.8)	11.3 (52.3)	7.3 (45.1)	15.0 (59.0)
Mean daily minimum °C (°F)	3.7 (38.7)	4.2 (39.6)	6.7 (44.1)	9.8 (49.6)	14.2 (57.6)	18.6 (65.5)	20.9 (69.6)	20.7 (69.3)	16.8 (62.2)	13.2 (55.8)	9.0 (48.2)	5.0 (41.0)	11.9 (53.4)
Average precipitation mm (inches)	57.1 (2.25)	65.9 (2.59)	66.0 (2.60)	64.5 (2.54)	69.7 (2.74)	42.0 (1.65)	37.2 (1.46)	49.1 (1.93)	77.0 (3.03)	81.2 (3.20)	84.8 (3.34)	72.5 (2.85)	767 (30.18)
Source: Weather.Directory

== History ==
The city is claimed to be founded by Saint Marinus and several Christian refugees fleeing from Roman persecution in the year 301.

The urban heart of the city was protected by three towers: the first, Guaita, built in the 11th century, held a reputation for being impenetrable which to a great extent discouraged attacks.

Tensions with bordering powers urged the necessity to build a second tower, Cesta (13th century). The defensive system was not completed until the construction of a third tower, the Montale (14th century)—the smallest of all and constructed on the last of the summits of Monte Titano.

With the population of the city increasing, the territory of the country was extended by a few square kilometers. Since the Sammarinese policy was not to invade or to use war to obtain new territories, it was by means of purchases and treaties that San Marino obtained the other eight castelli which make up the country.

Since 2008, the city has been enlisted as a UNESCO World Heritage Site under the inscription "San Marino Historic Centre and Mount Titano."

== Politics ==
The city serves as the headquarters of the Sammarinese Christian Democratic Party, a conservative party that currently serves as one of the main governing parties.

== Economy ==
The economy of the city of San Marino has always been closely bound to that of the country. Until recently, the main economic activities of the locality were stone extraction and carving. Today, there is a more varied economy, including tourism, commerce, sale of postage stamps, and a small agricultural industry, although the latter is in decline.

=== Landmarks ===
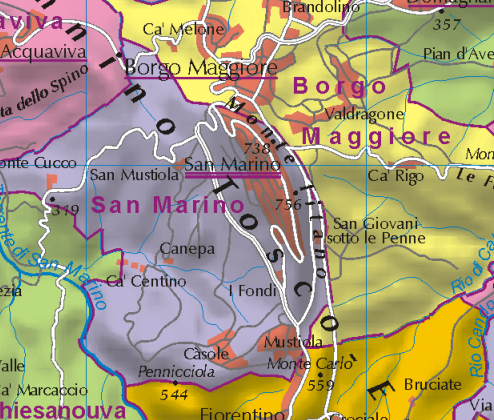
Map of the municipality of San Marino

The city is visited by more than three million people per year, and has developed progressively as a tourist centre. Of the tourists, 85% are Italian. There are also more than a thousand retail outlets.

==== Main sights ====
- Basilica di San Marino
- Palazzo dei Capitani
- Palazzo Pubblico
- Teatro Titano
- The Three Towers of San Marino
- Piazza del Titano
- Piazza Garibaldi
- Monastery of Santa Clara
- Grand Hotel San Marino

== Transport ==
The city is known for its long, winding cobblestoned streets, as its altitude and steep approach put it beyond the reach of the San Marino Highway. San Marino is also notable in that cars are prohibited in much of the city center. A series of lifts connects the upper part of city with the lower.

City of San Marino is the top terminus of the Funivia di San Marino, an aerial cablecar system that connects the city to Borgo Maggiore. Running every fifteen minutes, the two-minute ride is renowned for its panoramic views over San Marino, the Province of Rimini, and the Adriatic Sea. The City of San Marino terminus is located at the turn of Contrada Omagnano with Contrada del Pianello, at the historic city centre's northern end, next to the Tourism Secretariat and less than 200 metres (660 feet) from the Basilica of San Marino and the Piazza della Libertà.

The City of San Marino is the terminus of seven of San Marino's eight bus lines, which run to other settlements in the country. Additionally, the central bus stop in Piazzale Marino Calcigni is the terminus of a regular coach connection to Rimini, operated by coach companies Bonelli and Benedettini.

Between 1932 and 1944, a 31.5-kilometre (19.6-mile) electrified narrow gauge railway operated between Rimini and the City of San Marino. During the Second World War, the line was bombed and closed, after which its tunnels sheltered refugees during the Battles of Rimini and San Marino. After the war, the railway was abandoned in favour of the San Marino Highway.

In 2012, an 800-metre (1/2-mile) section was reopened as a heritage railway in the City of San Marino, running between Piazzale della Stazione and near Via Napoleone. The restored section comprises the original railway's final horseshoe turn through the 502-metre (1,647-foot) Montale tunnel.

== Sport ==
The city of San Marino has three football teams: the S.S. Murata, the S.P. Tre Penne and the San Marino Academy. The city had the Olympic Flame pass through San Marino during the run-up to the 2006 Winter Olympics.

== International relations ==
City of San Marino is twinned with:

- Rab, Croatia (1968)
- San Leo, Italy (1995)
- Nanjing, China (2021)

== Gallery ==
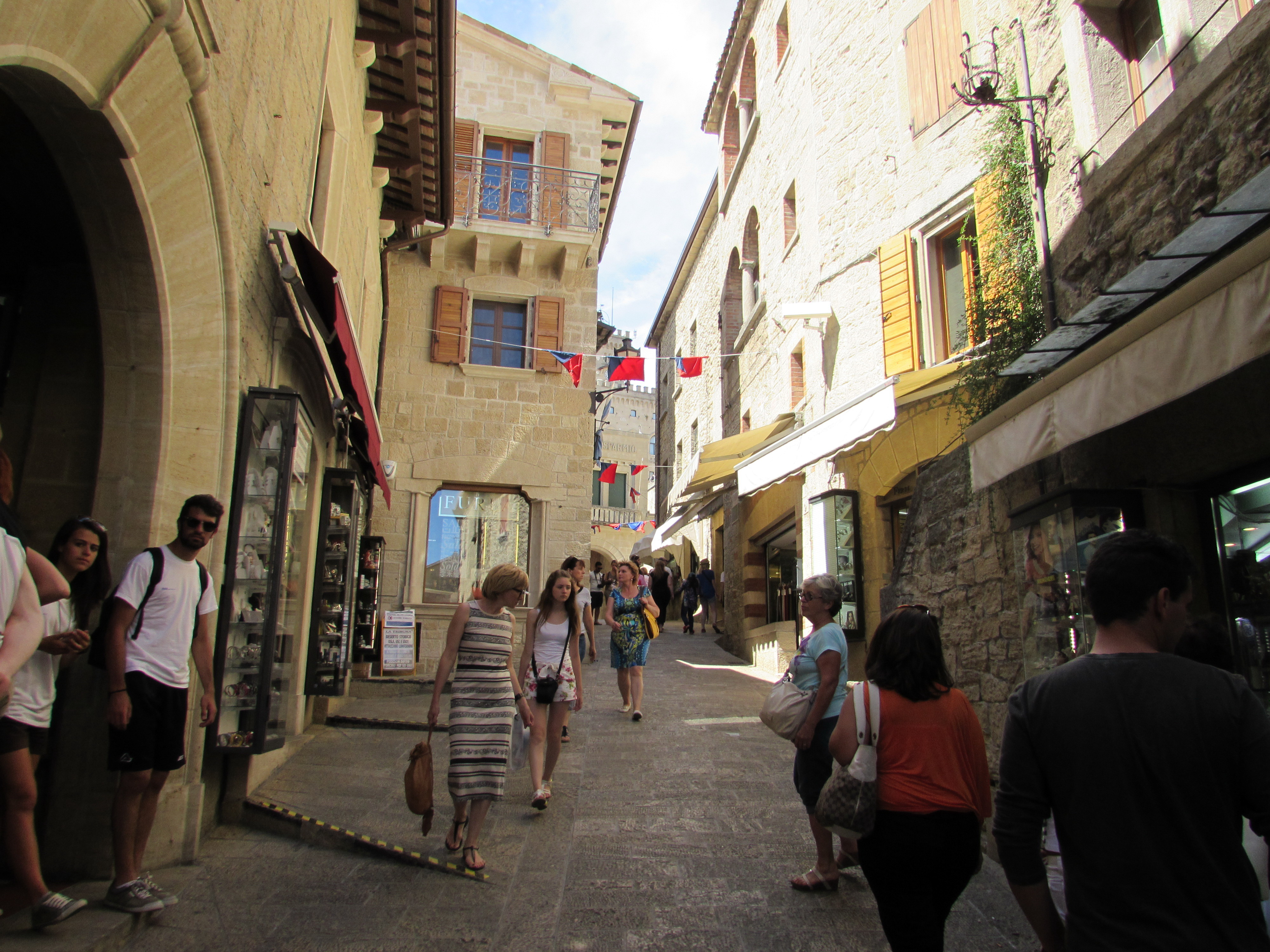
Via Basilicus

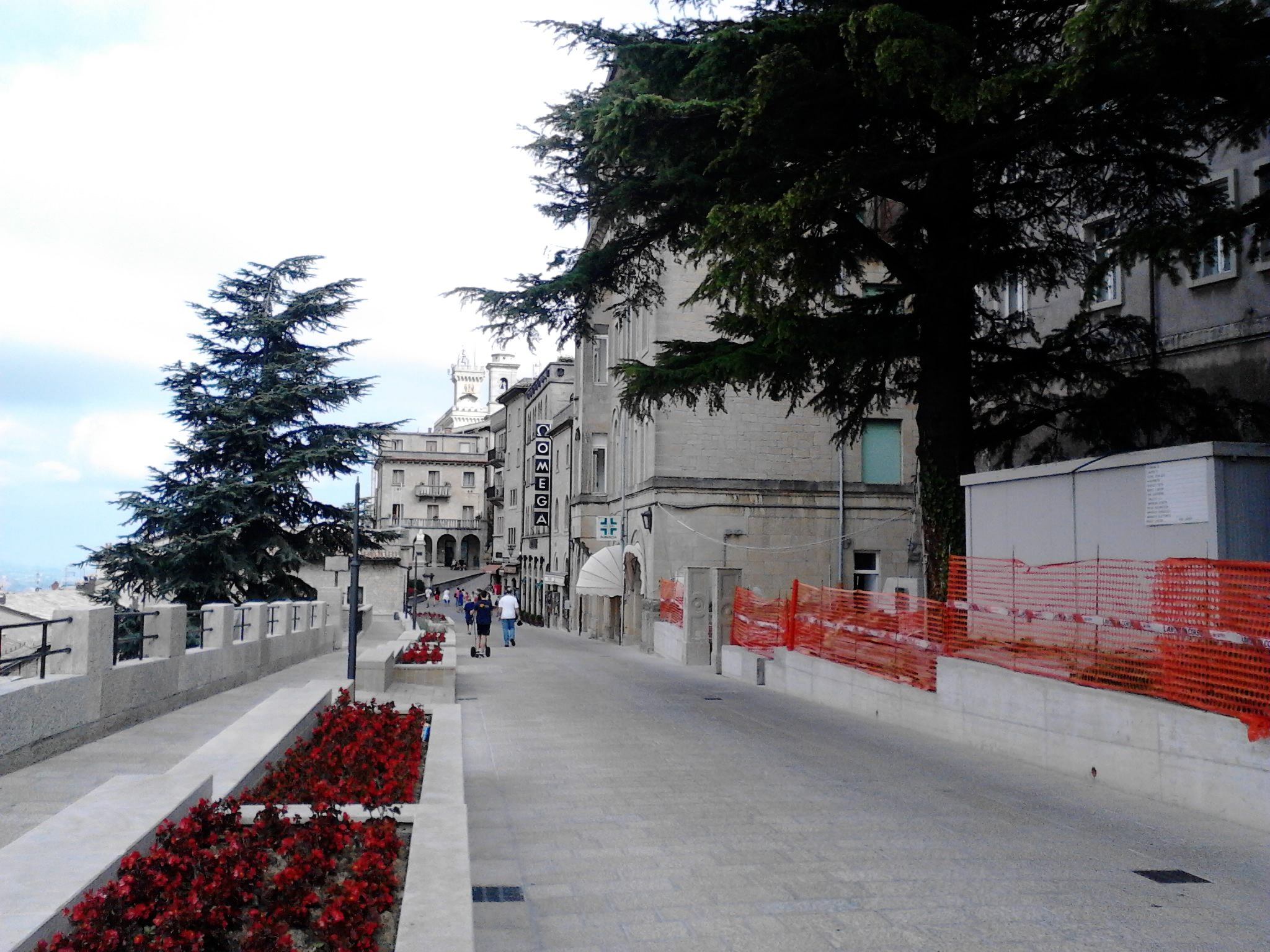
Via Paul III

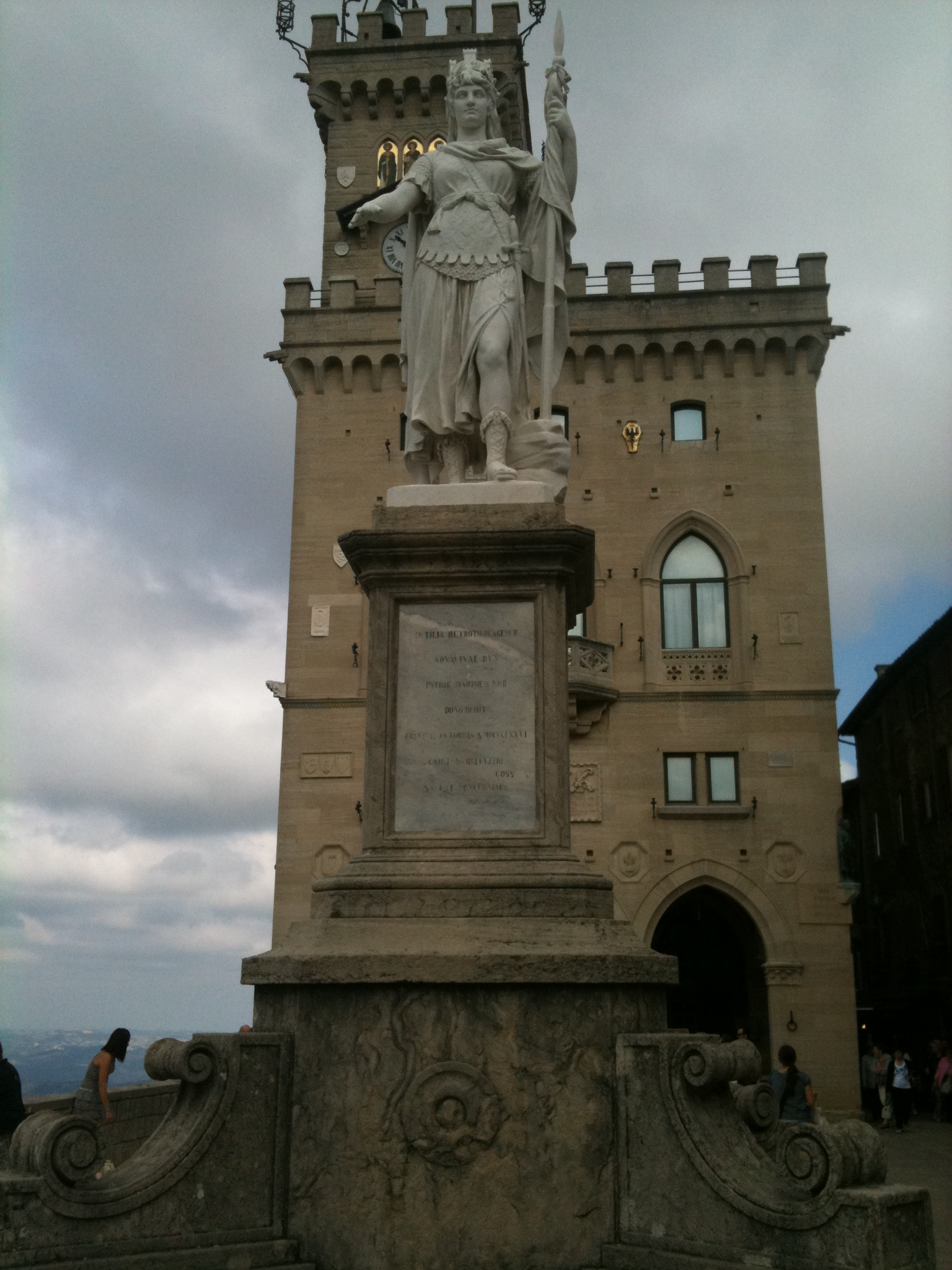
Statue of Liberty in the square of the City Hall

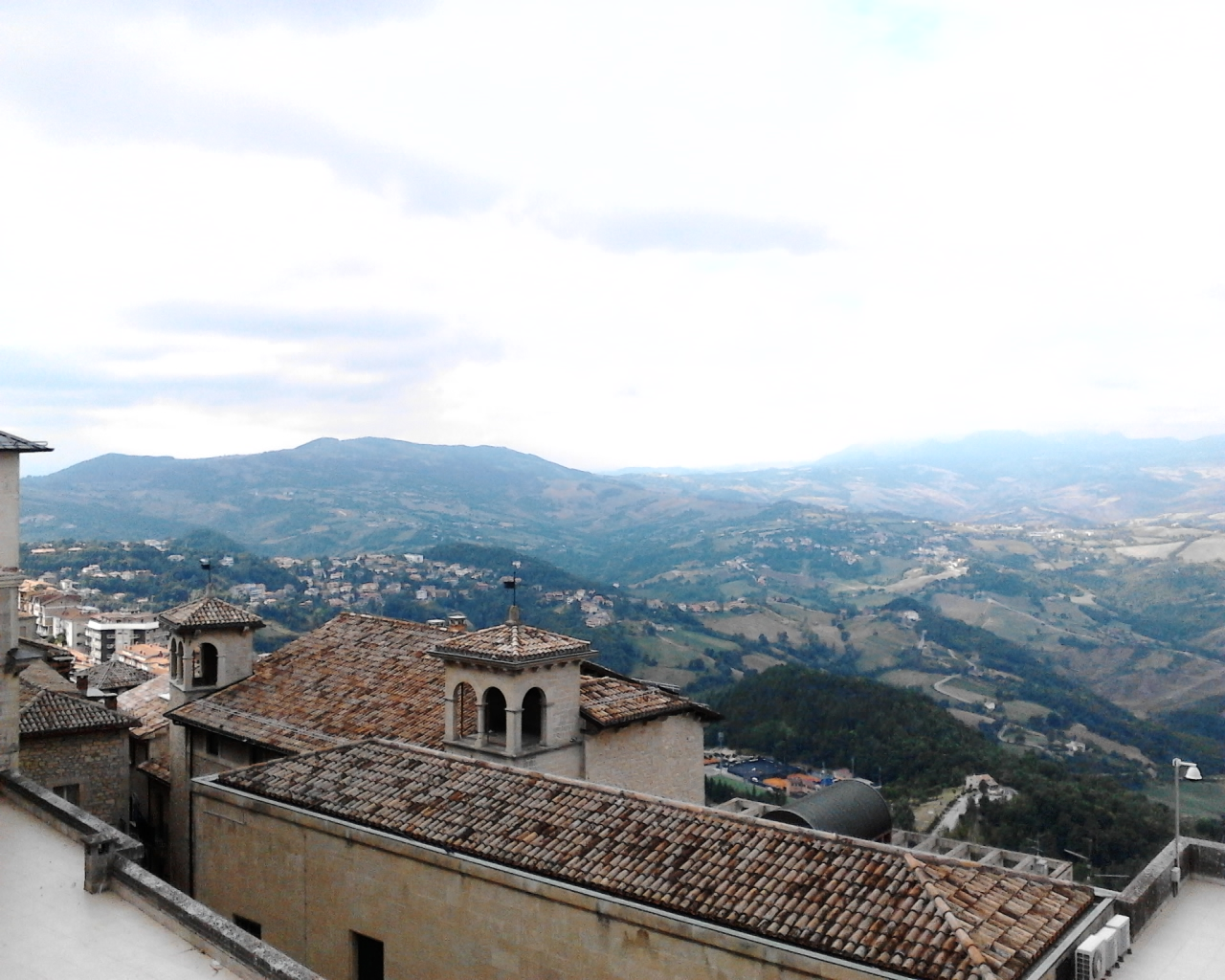
Panoramic view from Murata

== See also ==
- Carcere dei Cappuccini, the only prison in San Marino
