= Palazzo Pubblico (San Marino) =

City hall of San Marino

Coordinates: 43.9369°N 12.4466°E

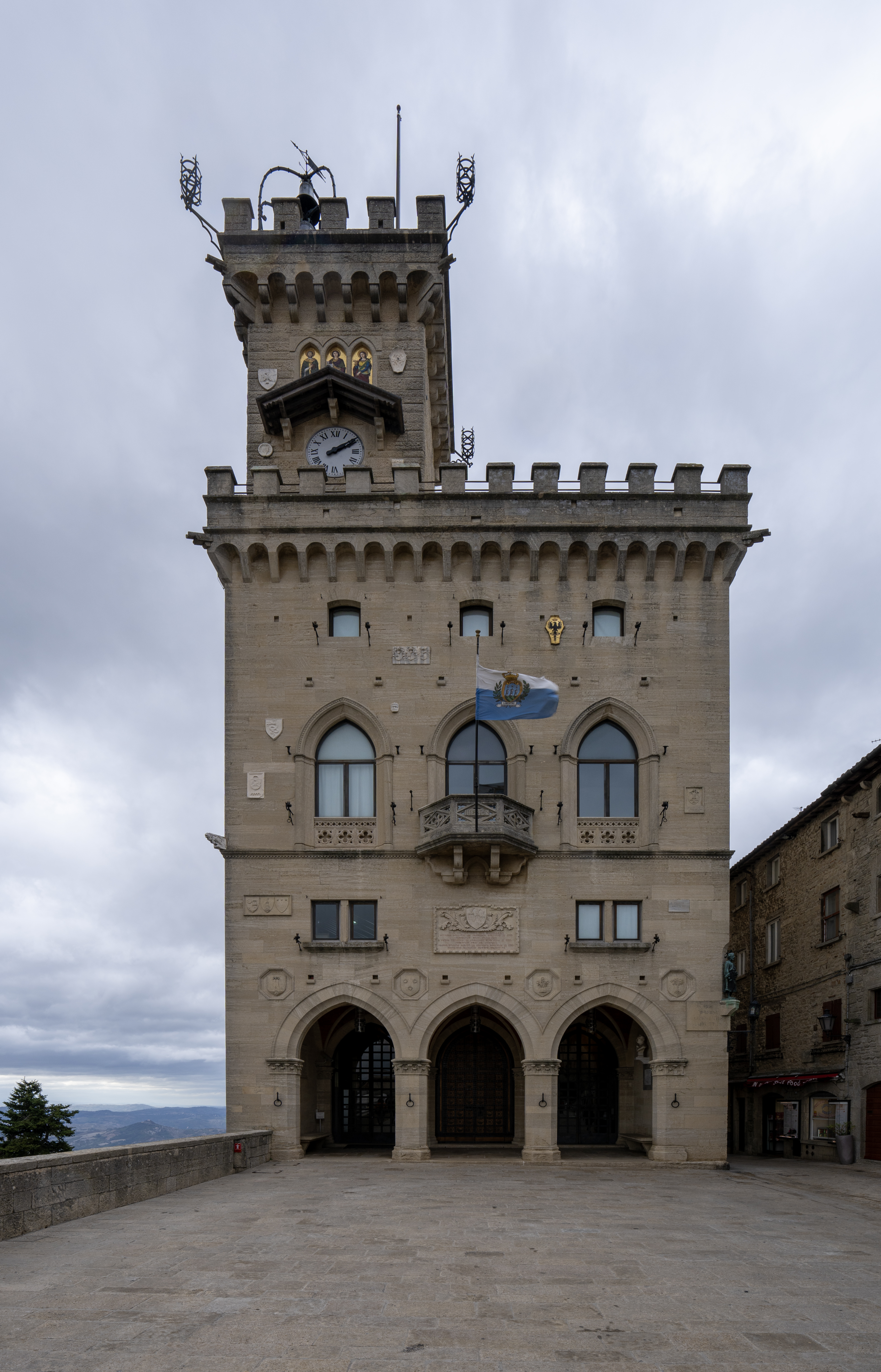
Exterior of the Palazzo Pubblico

The Palazzo Pubblico (‘Public Palace’) is the city hall of the City of San Marino. It is where official state ceremonies take place, and it is the seat of the Republic's main institutional and administrative bodies: the Captains Regent, the Grand and General Council, the Council of XII, and the Congress of State.

== Architecture ==
The building is located on the site of an ancient building called the Domus Magna Comunis, which was the predecessor to the Palazzo Pubblico, built in the 14th century. The current building was designed by the Roman architect Francesco Azzurri with construction beginning on 17 May 1884, and ending in 1894, with an inauguration ceremony taking place on 30 September 1894.

Following a century of minimal alteration, concerns over the structure's safety and functionality warranted a complex restoration project. The intervention was completed by the internationally renowned architect Gae Aulenti and an inauguration ceremony for the newly restored building was held on 30 September 1996.

The main section of the building is topped by battlements over a series of corbels. The clock tower above also features such an arrangement with battlements and corbels. The overall design is similar to the Palazzo Vecchio in Florence, but on a much smaller scale.

Inside the Chamber of the Council of XII is a painting by Guercino entitled San Marino che benedice la città (English: San Marino blessing the city).

== Gallery ==
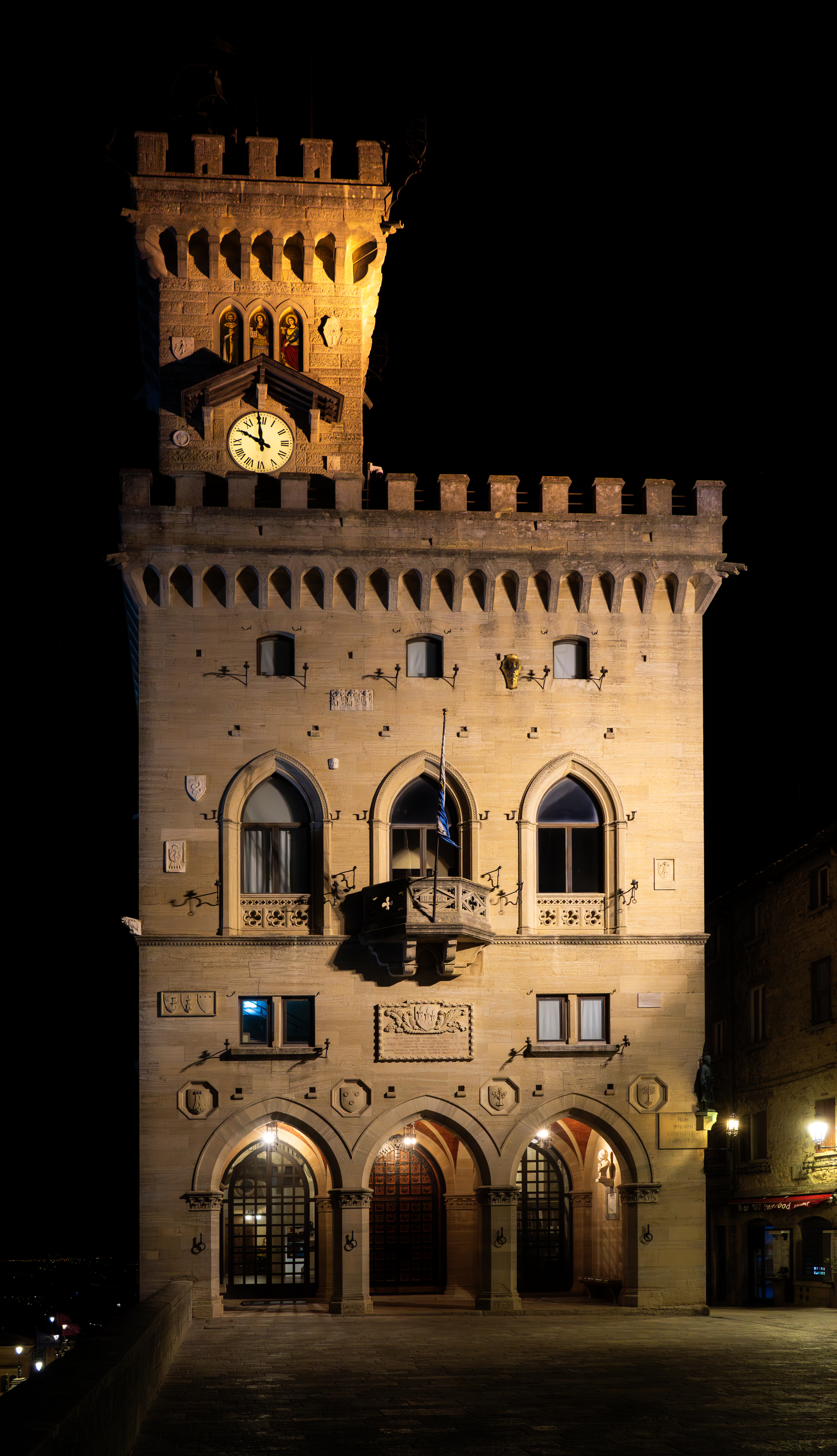
The Palace at night

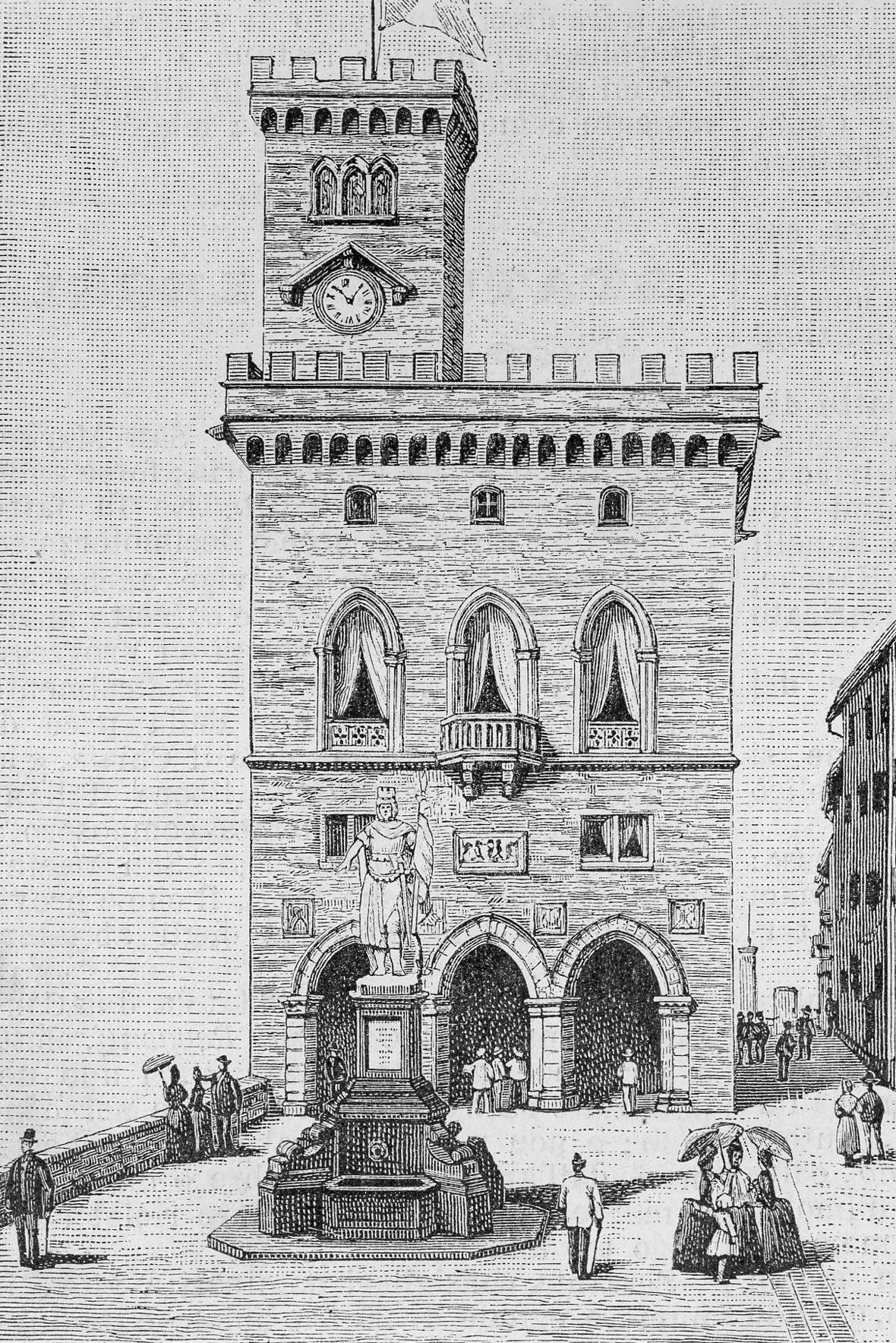
The Palace in 1889, with the Statua della Libertà pictured in front of it

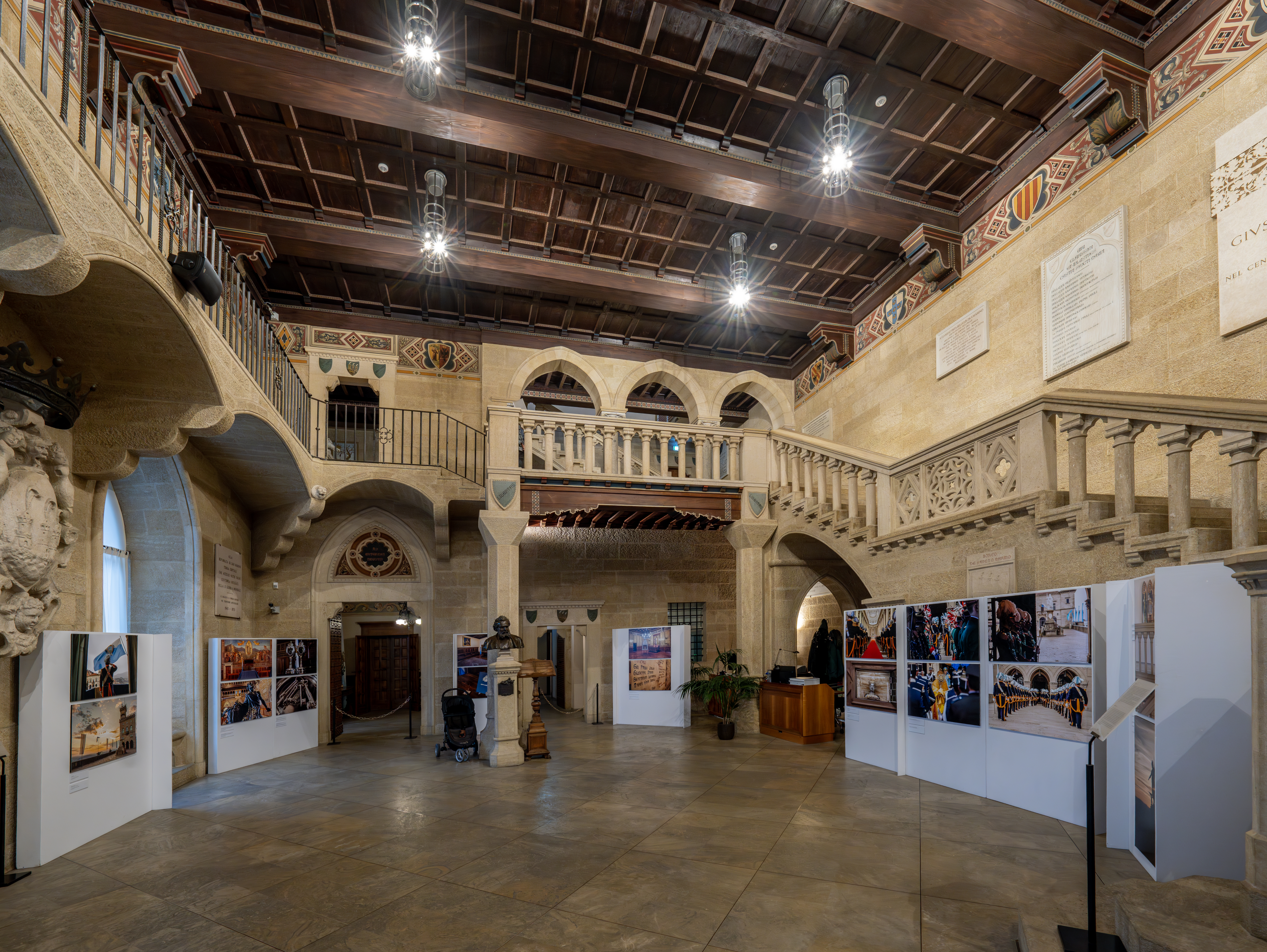
Entrance in 2023

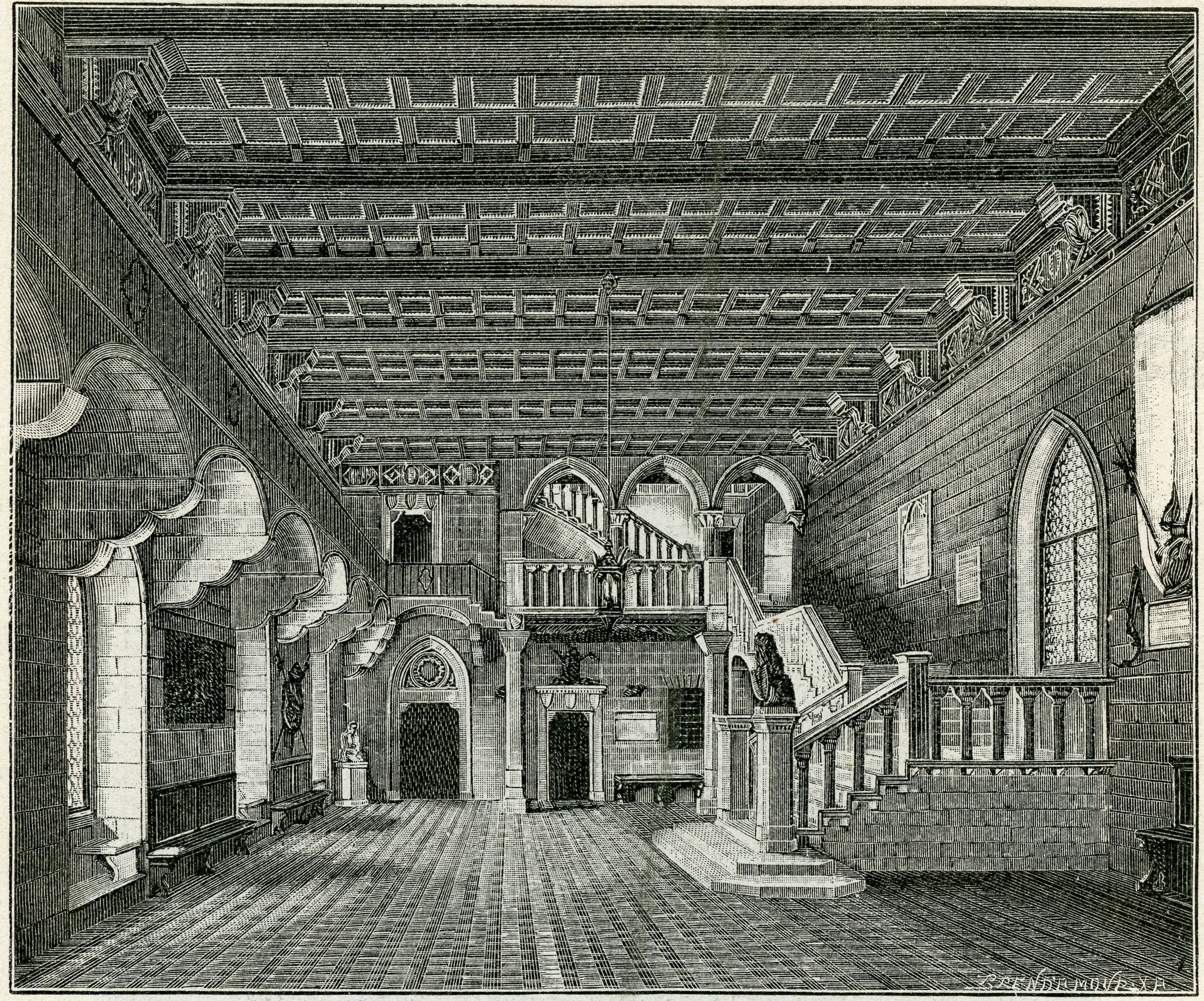
Entrance in 1900

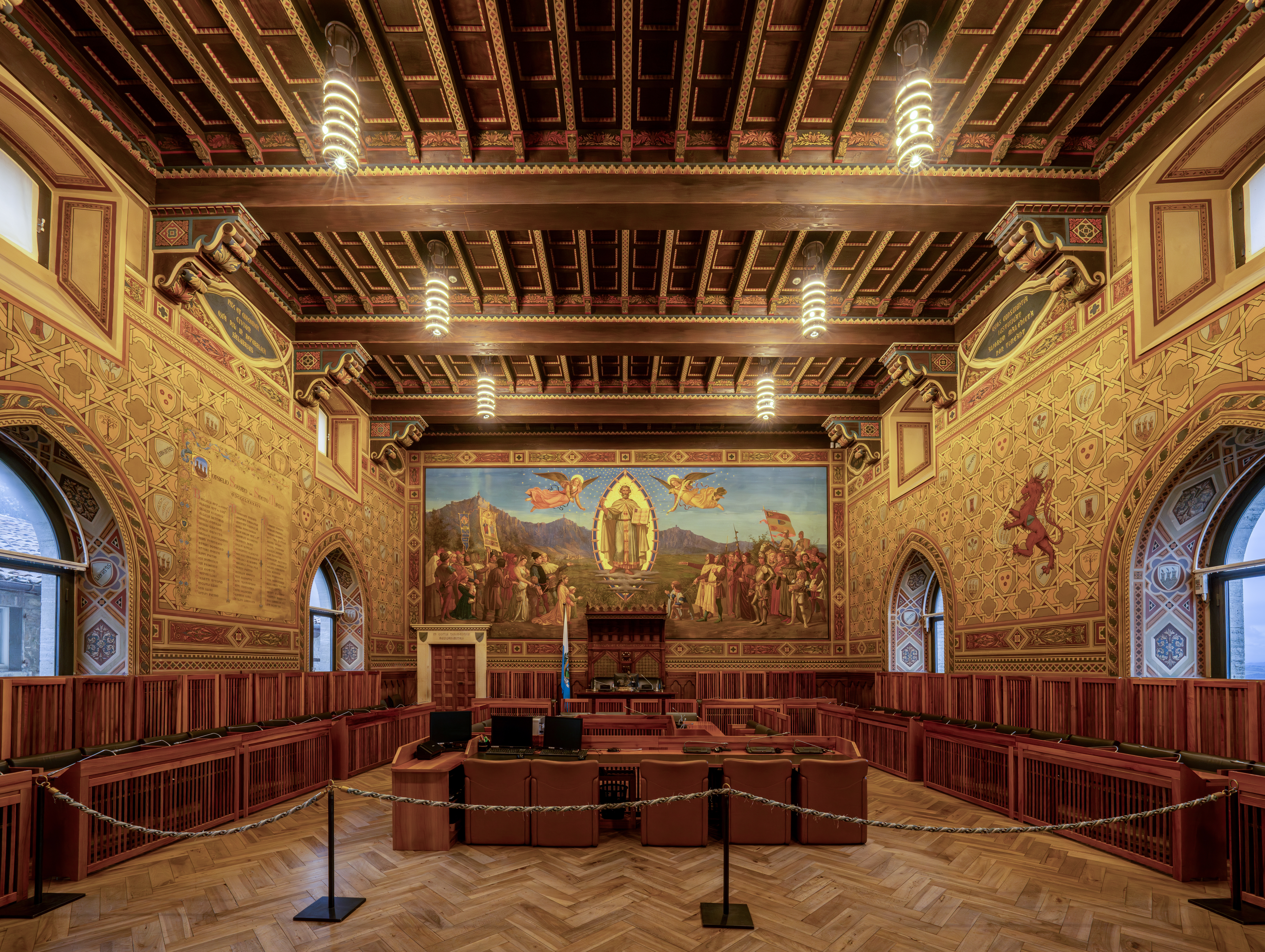
Chamber of the Grand and General Council

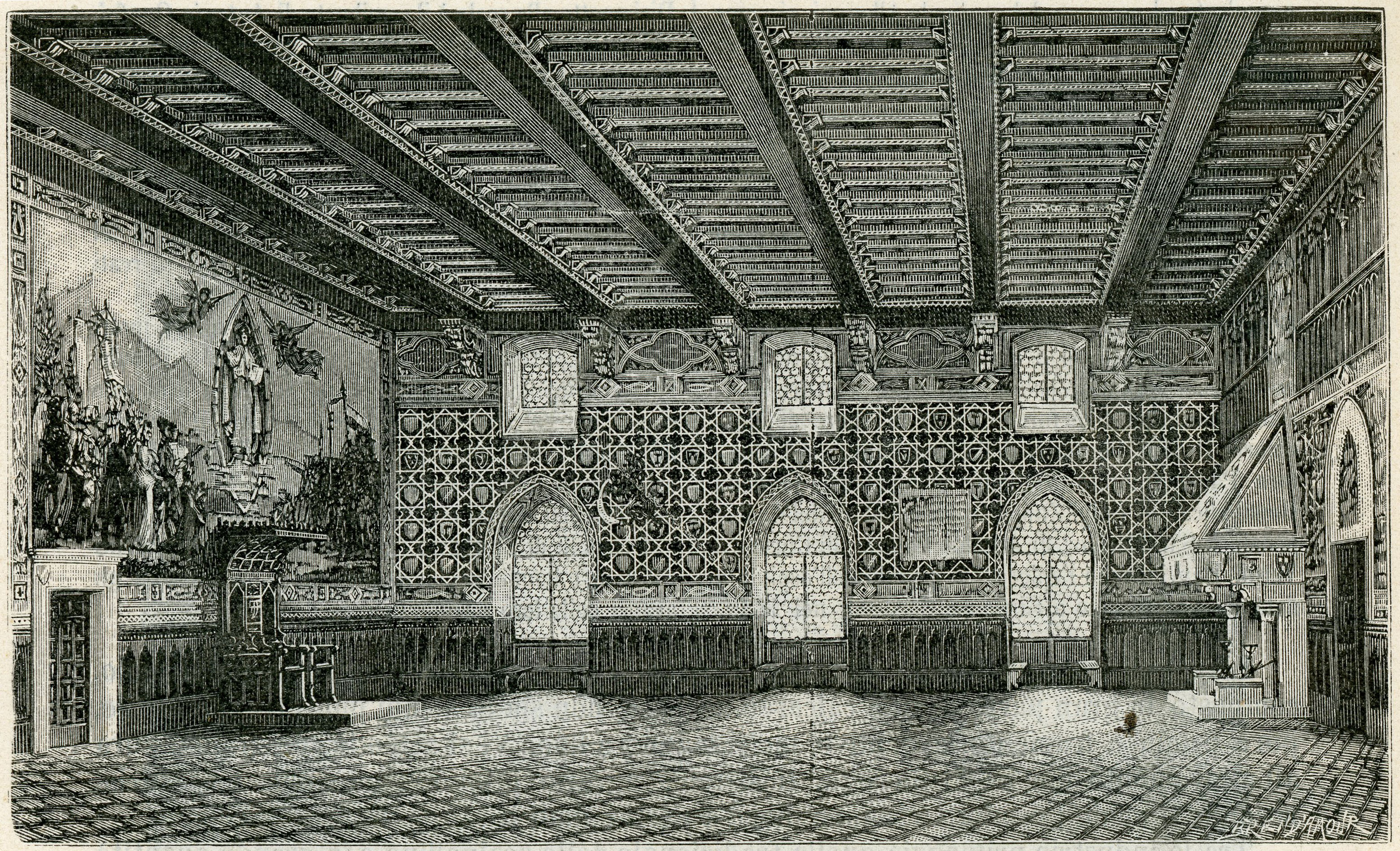
Chamber of the Grand and General Council in 1900

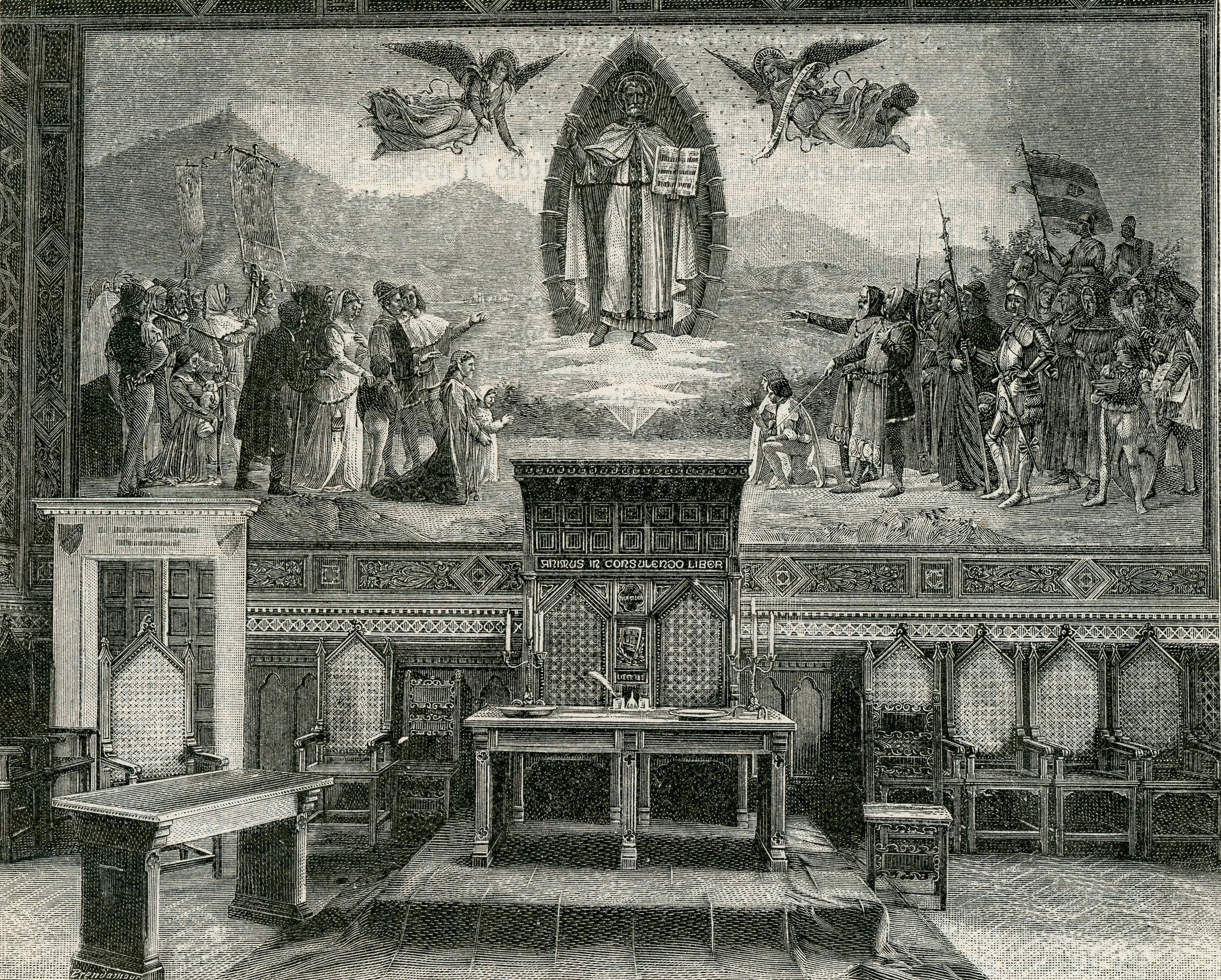
The mural of Saint Marinus in the Council’s chamber, with the seat of the captains regent in the foreground, in 1900

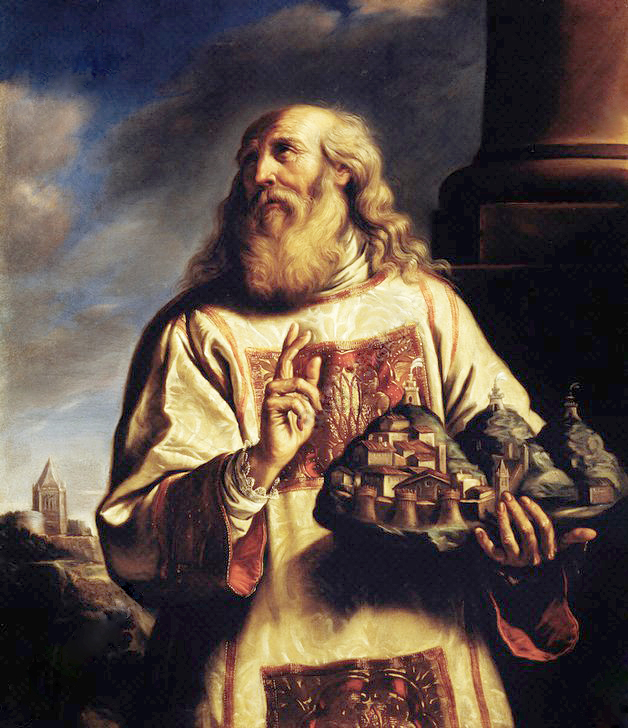
Painting inside the Palace, "San Marino blessing the city" by Guercino

== See also ==
- Palazzo Pubblico Clock Tower
- Three Towers of San Marino
- Basilica di San Marino
