= Carcere dei Cappuccini =

Prison in San Marino

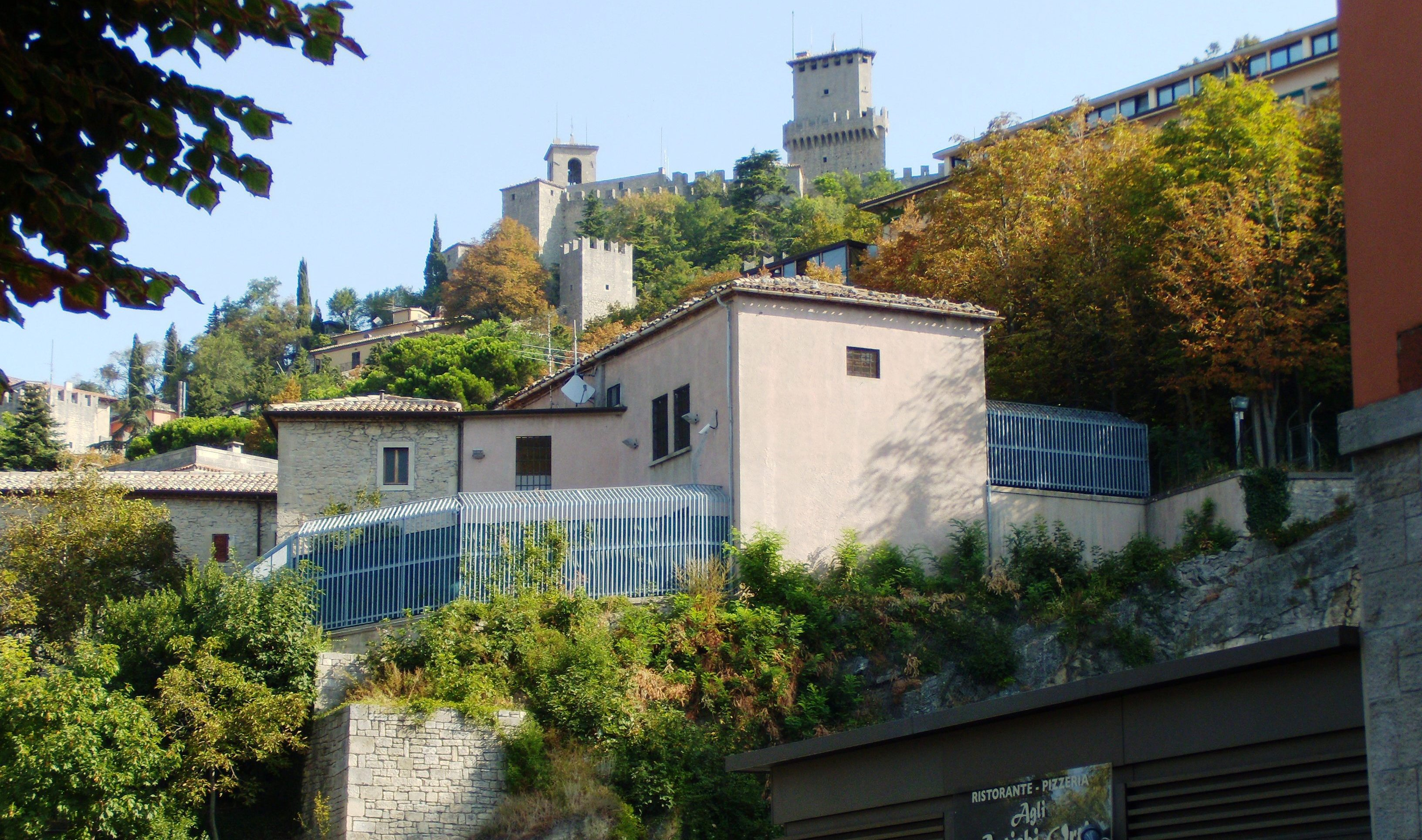
Carcere dei Cappuccini

Carcere dei Cappuccini is a prison in City of San Marino, San Marino. It was opened in 1970. Before 1970, the prison was based in Guaita, one of the 3 towers of the City of San Marino.

The prison has six cells on two floors. There are no prison police officers; instead, there are a few men from the gendarmerie.

The prison is located in a wing of an ancient Capuchin friars' convent.
