= Montale (San Marino) =

Mountain in San Marino

Coordinates: 43.9301°N 12.4526°E

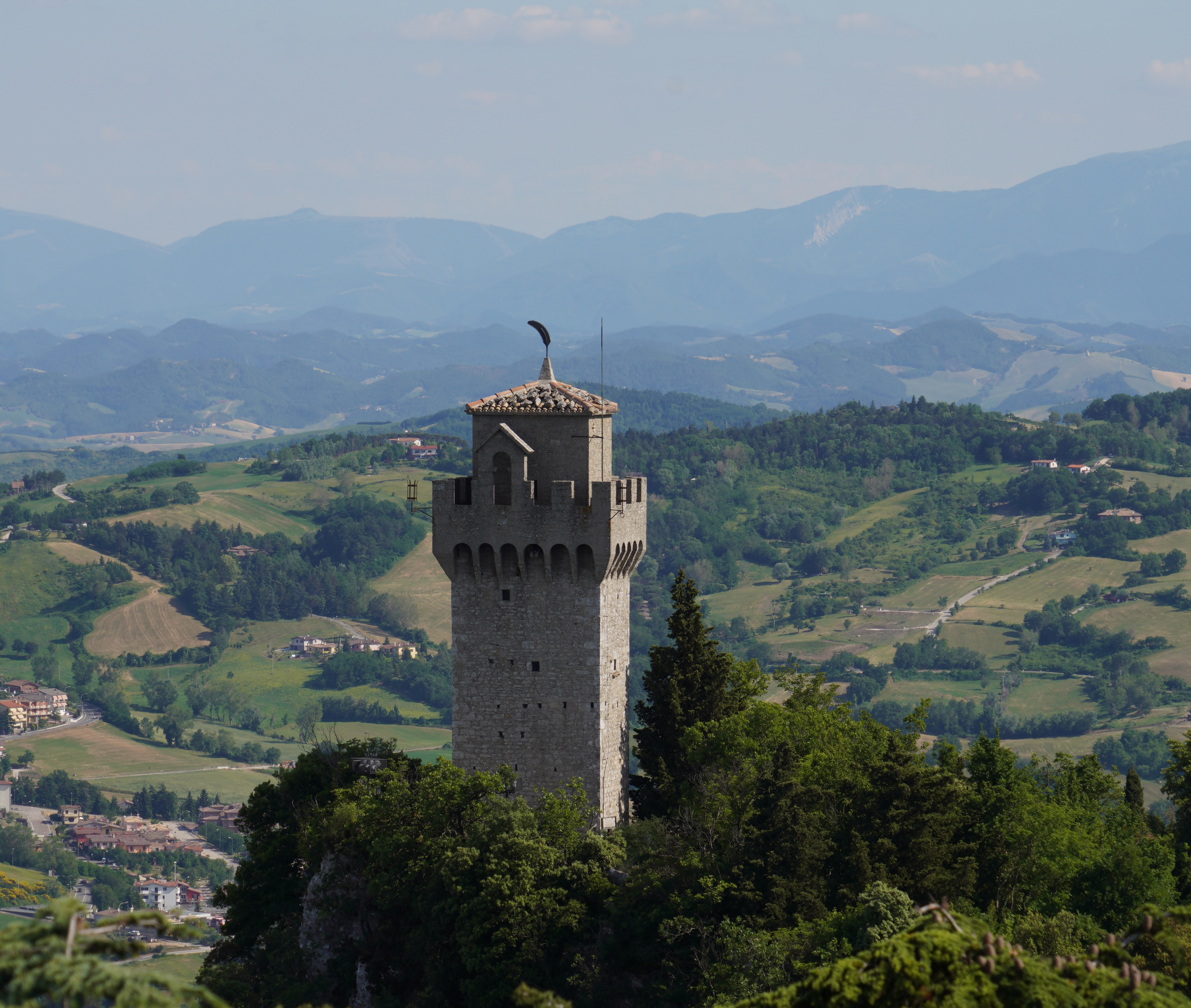
Montale tower

The Montale is one of three towered peaks overlooking the city of San Marino, the capital of San Marino. The other two are the Guaita and the Cesta.

== Overview ==
Montale is the smallest of the three peaks of Monte Titano. The tower on the peak was built in the 14th century, giving protection against the increasing power of the Malatesta family in that region. The only entrance to the tower is a door about seven metres from ground level, which was common for prison architecture of the time.

== History, cultural significance, and folklore ==
The Montale Tower was constructed in 1278, marking it as the youngest of San Marino's three iconic fortifications on Monte Titano. Built during a period of increasing regional tension, the tower primarily served as both a strategic watchtower and a prison. Its construction was a direct response to growing threats from the powerful Malatesta family of Rimini, who had territorial ambitions toward the small republic.

The tower's defensive importance is reflected in its austere design, featuring a single entrance positioned seven metres above ground level—a common architectural feature for medieval prisons that prevented easy escape. This entrance could only be accessed via a removable ladder, enhancing security. The interior contained a notorious dungeon known as "the bottom of the tower", where prisoners were detained in harsh conditions.

Together with the Guaita and Cesta towers, the Montale formed a formidable triangular defensive system that helped preserve San Marino's independence through centuries of Italian political turbulence. This defensive network has become so integral to San Marino's identity that all three towers appear on both the national flag and coat of arms, symbolizing the republic's long-standing sovereignty and freedom. Local folklore adds a cultural narrative to the three towers. A legendary path known as the "Path of the Witches" is said to connect them, with stories suggesting that witches would travel between the towers along the ridge of Monte Titano during nighttime gatherings.

The Montale underwent significant renovation in 1935, during which the tower and surrounding areas were carefully restored to preserve their historical integrity. Unlike its counterpart towers, the Montale has never been opened to the public, maintaining its mysterious character and historical authenticity. Despite this limited access, the tower remains an essential component of San Marino's cultural heritage and national identity.

== Architecture and structure ==
The Montale Tower features a distinctive pentagonal floor plan with an irregular geometry, setting it apart from the typically square or rectangular towers of the medieval period. Standing 17.68 metres tall, the tower's walls are about 100 centimetres (3.3 feet) thick and are believed to be of multi-leaf construction, a common building technique of the era where inner and outer stone layers encase a rubble fill. The tower's slenderness ratio—calculated as the proportion between its height and the smallest dimension of its base—is approximately 3.45, making it susceptible to certain structural vulnerabilities during seismic events.

The tower is organized into three distinct levels. The lowest floor features a stone slab positioned roughly 5 metres above ground level, with a thickness of around 50 centimetres. This elevation of the first floor contributed to the tower's defensive capabilities by preventing easy access. The middle level incorporates a timber floor construction, while the upper level is distinguished by a stone arch floor. This arch varies in thickness, measuring more than 1 metre at its edges and narrowing to about 30 centimetres at its centre span.

The roof structure consists of wooden framing covered with shingles that are stabilized by strategically placed stones—a practical solution for withstanding the local weather conditions. The uppermost section of the tower displays two significant medieval architectural elements: a pronounced cornice and battlements that encircle the building, typical features of defensive structures from this period.

Unlike many medieval towers that were incorporated into larger architectural complexes, the Montale stands in isolation from neighbouring structures. This isolation is architecturally significant as it preserves the tower's original defensive context and provides an unaltered view of its construction. The tower is built directly on bedrock, contributing to its considerable stability over more than seven centuries.

A comprehensive restoration of the tower was undertaken in 1935, helping to preserve its structural integrity while maintaining its historical authenticity. Modern studies using 3D laser scanning technology have provided detailed documentation of the tower's precise dimensions and structural characteristics, aiding in ongoing conservation efforts.
