= Francesco Azzuri =

Italian architect

Francesco Azzurri (Rome, 1831–1901) was an Italian architect. He was the nephew of the architect Giovanni Azzurri, a professor of architecture at the Academy of St. Luke in Rome.

== Biography ==
Francesco studied Engineering and Architecture at the University of Rome, under San Bartolo and Sereni, afterward in the Accademia di San Luca under his uncle. He traveled extensively.

Most of his designs are inside Rome and include the isolated building in piazza Pollarola; the palazzo Pericoli in via di Monserrato; the palazzo Negroni, now palazzo Caffarelli in via de' Condotti, the Hotel Bristol in piazza Barberini, the park next to the Palazzo Barberini; the restoration of the Palazzo Venezia, the villa and studio of the Polish artist Hendrik Siemiradski, the new Teatro Nazionale (1880–86, now demolished), the Palazzo Pubblico of the Republic of San Marino, and various funeral chapels in the Campo Varano. He dedicated himself to designing for charitable institutions, including hospitals and asylums. His asylums for the mentally ill in Rome and Siena were models for others. He designed the hospital of the Fatebenefratelli (1867) in the Isola Tiberina, the Ospedale di Santa Maria della Pietà (1862), and enlarged the Ospedale Maggiore and the orphanage.

He became professor and president of the Accademia di San Luca in Rome. He was named Commissioner for the Edification of the Palazzo of Fine Arts in Rome, Municipal Consigliere, and member of the Commission Archeologica, Edilizia e degli Archivii. He was named Knight of Order Piano and of San Gregorio Magno, Commander of the Order of Francesco Giuseppe, Knight of the Order of the Crown of Italy, the Spanish Order of Isabel the Catholic, and the Order of San Marino.
