= San Francesco Gate (San Marino) =

Sammarinese fortification from the 16th Century

The guard tower today.

Porta San Francesco (English: Saint Francis’ Gate), also known as the Loco Gate, is a Sammarinese fortification located on the border between San Marino and Italy. The gate was constructed in the early 1500s, and was the first one constructed of all fortifications of the third wall around San Marino. A strip of land in front of the gate was kept clear of vegetation and debris to provide no cover for any intruding force.

== Description ==
A side view of the tower from the left side.

Since 1361, the site of the Porta San Francesco Gate was occupied by a small guardpost which was demolished when the modern gatehouse was constructed. The gatehouse is the modern entrance to the “Old Town” section of San Marino. The San Francesco Gate was built using chiseled sandstone from the nearby quarries. A small balcony protrudes from the facade of the gate, and it bears the coat of arms of the Republic of San Marino. On the inside of the walls was a hollow space used for garrisoning the soldiers who operated the gate. Above the balcony is a coat of arms for the church of St. Francis, the gate's namesake. The coat of arms features a soaring eagle in flight.

A rear view of the gate.

Guido Antonio da Montefeltro, liege lord of Urbino, ordered the construction of the third curtain wall around San Marino in 1441. When the wall was complete, Porta San Francesco became the main entrance to San Marino.

In the 1600s, following the advice of architect Giovan Battista Belluzzi, the walls were reinforced with sandstone. This renovation was also done at the same time as the construction of the Mill, Slaughterhouse, and Theatre bastions, thus adding a more modern defense to San Marino. The architect who renovated the gatehouse between 1935 and 1939 said that the walls had to be reconstructed due to limy-sandstone which weathered easily. Conservative maintenance is occasionally performed to try and preserve the structure.

== Preserved statutes ==
In between the first and second doors are 17th century plaques which give instructions to the gate guards as to search visitors for weapons. It states:

"In all cases the guards shall never let foreigners enter through the gates into our city with any weapons of any types, but having conducted a diligent search, they shall have the foreigners yield all the weapons of all those who enter and duly keep them for as long as these foreigners remain in our city."

1 of the statute plaques from the 17th century.

Another plaque says:

"The San Marino gate keepers elected by the Lord (Regent) Captains must guard the gates both day and night with loyalty and diligence and whoever wants to enter or exit at night may nor may the gates be opened unless for public affairs."
